= Vought XSB3U =

XSB3U-1
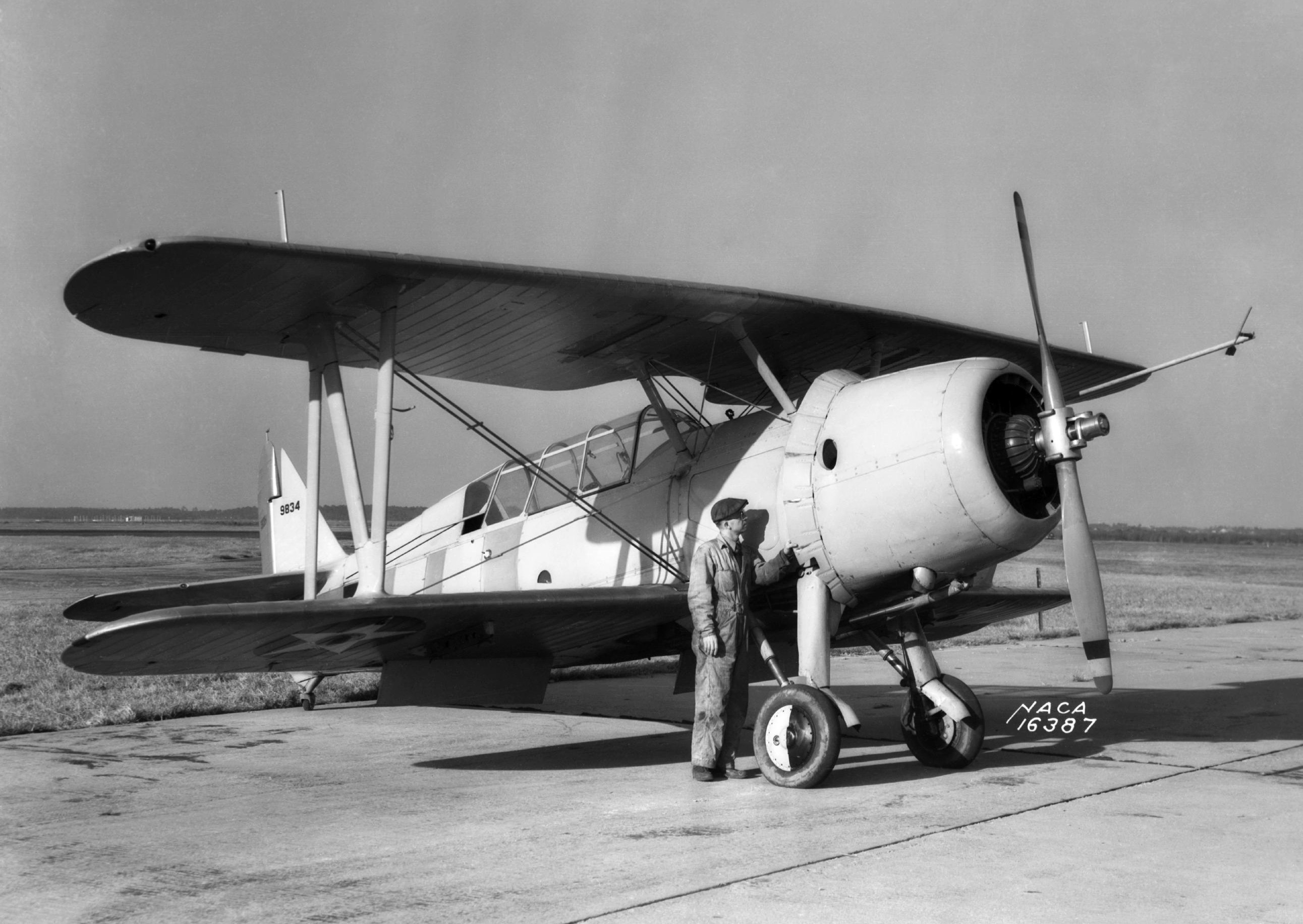

General information
- Type: Scout bomber
- Manufacturer: Vought-Sikorsky
- Status: cancelled
- Primary user: United States Navy
- Number built: 1
- Serial: 9834

History
- First flight: 1936
- Developed from: SBU Corsair

The Vought XSB3U was an American biplane scout bomber developed by Vought-Sikorsky for the United States Navy during the 1930s. Developed as an alternative to the SB2U Vindicator monoplane, the aircraft proved unsatisfactory to the Navy in comparison, and development was not pursued.

== Design and development ==
In late 1934, the U.S. Navy's Bureau of Aeronautics (BuAer) issued a specification for new scout bomber and torpedo bomber designs. Eight companies submitted ten designs in response, evenly split between monoplanes and biplanes. (Note: The designs submitted, in total, were the Brewster SBA, Curtiss SBC Helldiver, Douglas TBD Devastator, Great Lakes XB2G, Great Lakes XTBG, Grumman XSBF, Hall XPTBH, Northrop BT (which became the Douglas SBD Dauntless), Vought SB2U Vindicator and Vought XSB3U.)

Exemplifying the Bureau of Aeronautics' reluctance to fully embrace the monoplane configuration for carrier-based aircraft, the XSB3U-1 was proposed as a more conventional alternative to Vought's XSB2U-1, which was designed as a modern monoplane. The XSB3U was modified from the last production SBU Corsair, using essentially the same airframe, including a fully enclosed cockpit, and Pratt & Whitney R-1535 radial engine, but with a more streamlined surface and cowling. In addition, the XSB3U had fully retractable landing gear.

== Operational history ==
The XSB3U-1 was delivered to Naval Air Station Anacostia for evaluation by the U.S. Navy in April 1936, at the same time as its primary competitor, the XSB2U-1. Comparative testing of the two aircraft during 1936 proved the complete superiority of the monoplane configuration; on the same power, the SB2U-1 was 15 miles per hour (24 km/h) faster despite being larger and heavier than the biplane. However, the Navy was impressed by the XSB3U's method of landing gear retraction, which provided a more streamlined surface after retraction than most other methods used at the time.

Following the end of the evaluation, the XSB3U was retained by the Navy, and used for experimental and liaison purposes by the Navy, also being used by NACA at Langley Field for testing of tail loads starting in August 1938, continuing through January 1939 when the aircraft was returned to the Navy, being retired shortly thereafter.

== Operators ==
United States

- United States Navy
- NACA

== Specifications (XSB3U-1) ==
Data from

General characteristics

- Crew: 2 (pilot and observer)
- Length: 28 ft 2 in (8.59 m)
- Wingspan: 33 ft 3 in (10.13 m)
- Wing area: 327 sq ft (30.4 m^{2})
- Empty weight: 3,876 lb (1,758 kg)
- Gross weight: 5,837 lb (2,648 kg)
- Powerplant: 1 × Pratt & Whitney R-1535-82 radial engine, 750 hp (560 kW)
- Propellers: 2-bladed Hamilton Standard variable-pitch

Performance

- Maximum speed: 215 mph (346 km/h, 187 kn) at 8,900 feet (2,700 m)
- Stall speed: 66 mph (106 km/h, 57 kn)
- Range: 525 mi (845 km, 456 nmi)
- Combat range: 590 mi (950 km, 510 nmi) with 500 pounds (230 kg) payload
- Service ceiling: 26,500 ft (8,100 m)

Armament

- Guns: 1 x .50-cal MG in cowl, 1 x .30-cal MG in rear cockpit
- Bombs: Up to 500 pounds (230 kg).

== See also ==
Related development

- Vought SBU Corsair

Aircraft of comparable role, configuration, and era

- Curtiss SBC Helldiver
- Great Lakes XB2G
- Grumman XSBF

Related lists

- List of United States Navy aircraft designations (pre-1962)
