= Hall XPTBH =

1937 US experimental torpedo-bomber seaplane

XPTBH
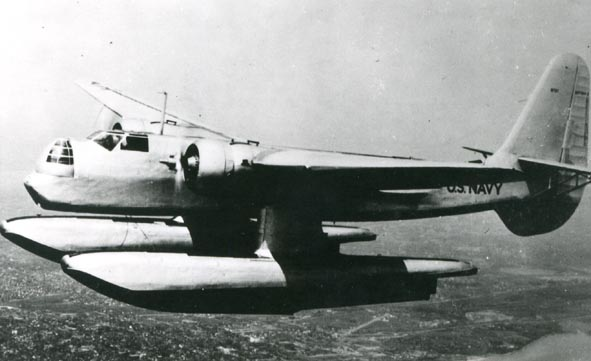
- The XPTBH-2 in flight

General information
- Type: Seaplane torpedo-bomber
- Manufacturer: Hall Aluminum Aircraft Corporation
- Primary user: United States Navy
- Number built: 1
- Serial: 9721

History
- First flight: February 1937
- Retired: September 21, 1938
- Fate: Destroyed in hurricane September 21, 1938

The Hall XPTBH was a prototype American twin-engined seaplane, submitted to the United States Navy by the Hall Aluminum Aircraft Corporation in response to a 1934 specification for new bomber and scout aircraft. Constructed in an innovative fashion that made extensive use of aluminum, the XPTBH proved successful in flight testing, but failed to win favor with the U.S. Navy. No production contract was awarded, and the single aircraft built served in experimental duties before its destruction in a hurricane during 1938.

== Design and development ==
In late 1934, the U.S. Navy's Bureau of Aeronautics (BuAer) issued a specification for new scout bomber and torpedo bomber designs. Eight companies submitted a total of ten designs in response, evenly split between monoplanes and biplanes. (Note: The designs submitted, in total, were the Brewster SBA, Curtiss SBC, Douglas TBD, Great Lakes XB2G, Great Lakes XTBG, Grumman XSBF, Hall XPTBH, Northrop BT (which became the SBD Dauntless), Vought SB2U and Vought XSB3U; the XTBD and XTBG were the XPTBH's main competitors.) The Hall Aluminum Aircraft Company submitted the only seaplane design; a single prototype was ordered by the Navy for evaluation on June 30, 1934. Given the designation XPTBH-1, it became the only aircraft to receive three mission-type letters under the U.S. Navy's designation system used between 1922 and 1962.

Hall's choice of the twin-float seaplane configuration was dictated by the Navy's requirement that the new torpedo-bomber design should be capable of carrying a standard naval torpedo of the type carried by destroyers. As ordered, the XPTBH-1 was intended to be fitted with Wright R-1820 "Cyclone" radial engines; delays in design caused by Hall relocating their production facility, difficulties with the contract, and doubts about the aircraft's performance potential led to a redesign, the aircraft becoming slightly smaller and the engines being changed to a pair of Pratt & Whitney R-1830 "Twin Wasp" radials. The changes to the aircraft resulted in it receiving the revised designation XPTBH-2.

Utilising Hall's standard aluminum tubular spar, the fuselage and wing leading edges were covered in aluminum, while the rest of the wing and the control surfaces were fabric-covered. The aircraft was well-armed defensively by 1930s standards, with a powered turret, designed by Hall, mounted in the nose and carrying a single .30-caliber machine gun. Hand-traversed mountings for a pair of machine guns were fitted in dorsal (top) and ventral (belly) positions aft. An optically flat glass panel was fitted in the nose below the turret for use by the bombardier; the aircraft's offensive weaponry, consisting of a Mark XIII aerial torpedo or, alternatively, up to 2,000 pounds (910 kg) of bombs, was carried in an internal bomb bay, the twin-float arrangement allowing for a clear release of the weaponry.

== Operational history ==
Delivered to the Navy on January 30, 1937, (Note: A Navy source gives December 17, 1936 as the acceptance date.) the aircraft was officially presented to the public at Hall's Bristol, Pennsylvania, factory in April of that year. The aircraft's early flight testing, starting in February and conducted by test pilot Bill McAvoy, showed that the XPTBH had few faults, with the only significant issue being a lack of roll authority – a reduction of the ability of the ailerons to turn the aircraft – as a result of the surface area of the floats. A modification to increase the area of the rudder solved the issue. The aircraft's water-handling characteristics were found to be excellent; the only significant complaints that surfaced during the testing period concerned the XPTBH-2's beaching gear, which was found to be extremely difficult to use in anything other than the calmest water.

Although the XPTBH-2 met most of its design specifications and was rated overall very good in flight testing, it failed to meet the contractual requirements for top speed and attack speed. In addition, the U.S. Navy did not consider a seagoing torpedo-bomber to be an aircraft for which there was an operational requirement; the fact that as a floatplane the aircraft was restricted to operation from water was also considered a negative, while the aircraft's "three-in-one" role led it to be viewed as a jack of all trades, purpose-designed aircraft for each role being considered superior. The company, however, blamed Navy politics for the lack of a production order.

Following the conclusion of its test program, the XPTBH-2 was used for experimental duties at the Naval Torpedo Station in Newport, Rhode Island, participating in trials of aerial torpedoes. Its service at Newport came to an end on September 21, 1938, when the XPTBH-2 was destroyed during the Great New England Hurricane. The XPTBH-2 was the last aircraft designed by Hall Aluminum; the company remained in business until 1940, when it was bought out by Consolidated Aircraft. (Note: Deliveries of the Hall PH, a biplane flying boat which first flew in 1929, continued until 1941.)

== Specifications (XPTBH-2) ==
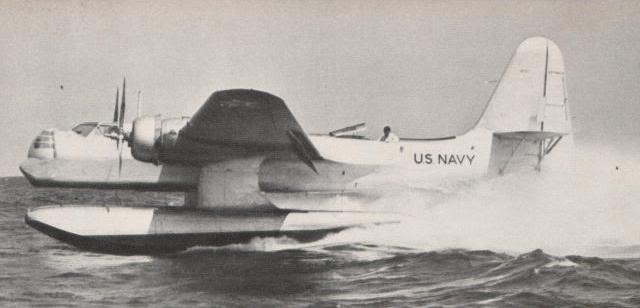
The XPTBH-2 on the water

Data from Wegg 1990, Trimble 2005, Boyne 2001

General characteristics

- Crew: four (pilot, copilot/navigator/bombardier, flight mechanic/gunner, radio operator/gunner)
- Length: 55 ft 11 in (17.04 m)
- Wingspan: 79 ft 4 in (24.18 m)
- Height: 24 ft 1 in (7.34 m)
- Wing area: 828 sq ft (76.9 m^{2})
- Airfoil: Clark YM
- Empty weight: 11,992 lb (5,439 kg)
- Gross weight: 17,983 lb (8,157 kg)
- Max takeoff weight: 21,414 lb (9,713 kg)
- Powerplant: 2 × Pratt & Whitney XR-1830-60 radial piston engines, 800 hp (600 kW) each
- Propellers: 3-bladed Curtiss constant-speed

Performance

- Maximum speed: 182 mph (293 km/h, 158 kn)
- Cruise speed: 170 mph (270 km/h, 150 kn)
- Range: 2,621 mi (4,219 km, 2,278 nmi)
- Combat range: 850 mi (1,369 km, 739 nmi) with torpedo
- Service ceiling: 20,400 ft (6,200 m) at 17,983 pounds (8,157 kg) mission weight
- Time to altitude: 5.3 minutes to 5,000 feet (1,500 m)
- Wing loading: 25.8 lb/sq ft (126 kg/m^{2})

Armament

- Guns: 2 x .30-caliber machine guns in nose turret and dorsal position; 1 x .30-cal or .50-cal machine gun in ventral position
- Bombs: One Mark XIII torpedo or up to 2,000 pounds (910 kg) bombs

== See also ==
Aircraft of comparable role, configuration, and era

- Blohm & Voss Ha 140
- CANT Z.506
- Fiat RS.14
- Fokker T.VIII
- Heinkel He 115

Related lists

- List of United States Navy aircraft designations (pre-1962)
- List of flying boats and floatplanes
