= Grumman XSBF =

1936 US scout bomber prototype biplane

XSBF-1
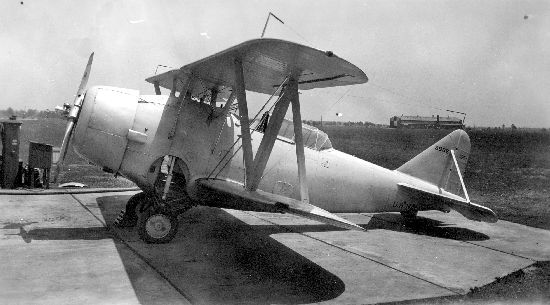

General information
- Type: Scout bomber
- Manufacturer: Grumman
- Primary user: United States Navy
- Number built: 1
- Serial: 9996

History
- First flight: 18 February 1936
- Developed from: Grumman SF
- Fate: Crashed, 25 May 1939

The Grumman XSBF, also known by the company designation G-14, was an American biplane scout bomber developed by Grumman Aircraft for the United States Navy during the 1930s. Derived from Grumman's successful "Fifi" fighter, the aircraft was developed at a time when the biplane was giving way to the monoplane. In competition against other aircraft it proved to possess inferior performance in its intended role, and did not enter production. The sole prototype went on to serve as a liaison aircraft, as well as being used in experiments by NACA, before being destroyed in a crash in 1939.

== Design and development ==
In late 1934, the U.S. Navy's Bureau of Aeronautics (BuAer) issued a specification for new scout bomber and torpedo bomber designs. Eight companies submitted 10 designs in response, evenly split between monoplanes and biplanes. (Note: The designs submitted, in total, were the Brewster SBA, Curtiss SBC Helldiver, Douglas TBD Devastator, Great Lakes XB2G, Great Lakes XTBG, Grumman XSBF, Hall XPTBH, Northrop BT (which became the Douglas SBD Dauntless), Vought SB2U Vindicator and Vought XSB3U.) Grumman, having successfully provided the FF and F2F fighters to the Navy, along with the SF scout, submitted an advanced development of the SF-2 in response to the specification's request for a 5,000 lb (2,300 kg) aircraft capable of carrying a 500 lb (230 kg) bomb. Given the model number G-14 by Grumman, the aircraft received the official designation XSBF-1 by the Navy, and a contract for a single prototype was issued in March 1935.

The XSBF-1 was a two-seat biplane, featuring an enclosed cockpit, a fuselage of all-metal construction, and wings covered largely with fabric. Power was provided by a 650 hp (480 kW)Pratt & Whitney R-1535 Twin Wasp Junior air-cooled radial engine driving with a variable-pitch propeller. Armament was planned to be two .30 in (7.62 mm) forward-firing M1919 Browning machine guns, one of which could be replaced by a .50 in (12.7 mm) M2 Browning; the prototype carried only a single gun. A single .30 in weapon was fitted in the rear cockpit for defense, and one 500 lb (230 kg) bomb to be carried in a launching cradle under the fuselage. The arrestor hook was carried in a fully enclosed position, while flotation bags were fitted in the wings in case the aircraft was forced to ditch. The landing gear of the XSBF-1 was similar to that of the F3F fighter.

== Operational history ==
The XSBF-1—piloted by test pilot Bud Gillies—flew for the first time on December 24, 1935. Following initial testing, which found the aircraft to be reasonably faultless, the XSBF-1 was delivered to the U.S. Navy for evaluation in competition with two other biplanes submitted to the 1934 specification, the Great Lakes XB2G and the Curtiss XSBC-3. Unusually for biplanes, all three types possessed retractable landing gear. The evaluation showed that the design from Curtiss was superior to the Grumman and Great Lakes designs, and an order was placed for the Curtiss type, designated SBC-3 Helldiver in service, in August 1936.

With the competition lost, the development of the XSBF-1 came to an end; the sole prototype was assigned to Naval Air Station Anacostia, where it had been tested, for use as a liaison aircraft and hack. In addition, the XSBF was used by the National Advisory Committee for Aeronautics' Langley Research Laboratory as part of the facility's work on aeronautical research. During its time at Anacostia, the aircraft was involved in two accidents, one on 5 September 1938 and the other on 25 May 1939. The second mishap—on May 25, 1939—resulted in the strike damage to the aircraft; the XSBF-1 was no longer considered worth returning to flight status, and the aircraft was officially stricken from the Navy inventory in July 1939.

The SBF-1 designation, unusually, was re-used by the Navy during World War II, assigned to SB2C Helldivers produced under license by Fairchild Aircraft.

== Operators ==
United States

- United States Navy

== Specifications (XSBF-1) ==
Data from

General characteristics

- Crew: 2 (pilot and observer)
- Length: 25 ft 9 in (7.85 m)
- Upper wingspan: 34 ft 6 in (10.52 m)
- Lower wingspan: 31 ft 6 in (9.60 m)
- Height: 11 ft 3 in (3.43 m)
- Wing area: 310 sq ft (29 m^{2})
- Airfoil: Clark CHY
- Empty weight: 3,395 lb (1,540 kg)
- Gross weight: 5,002 lb (2,269 kg)
- Fuel capacity: 130 US gal (490 L)
- Powerplant: 1 × Pratt & Whitney R-1535-72 Twin Wasp Junior radial engine, 650 hp (480 kW)
- Propellers: 2-bladed Hamilton Standard variable-pitch

Performance

- Maximum speed: 215 mph (346 km/h, 187 kn)
- Stall speed: 67 mph (108 km/h, 58 kn)
- Range: 525 mi (845 km, 456 nmi)
- Combat range: 688 mi (1,107 km, 598 nmi)
- Service ceiling: 26,000 ft (7,900 m)

Armament

- Guns:
- 1 × .30 in (7.62 mm) machine gun in cowling
- 1 × .30 in machine gun in rear cockpit
- Bombs: Up to 500 pounds (230 kg)

== See also ==
Related development

- Grumman FF

Aircraft of comparable role, configuration, and era

- Curtiss SBC Helldiver
- Great Lakes XB2G
- Vought XSB3U

Related lists

- List of United States Navy aircraft designations (pre-1962)
