= Douglas TBD Devastator =

US Navy carrier-based torpedo bomber in service 1937-1942

TBD Devastator
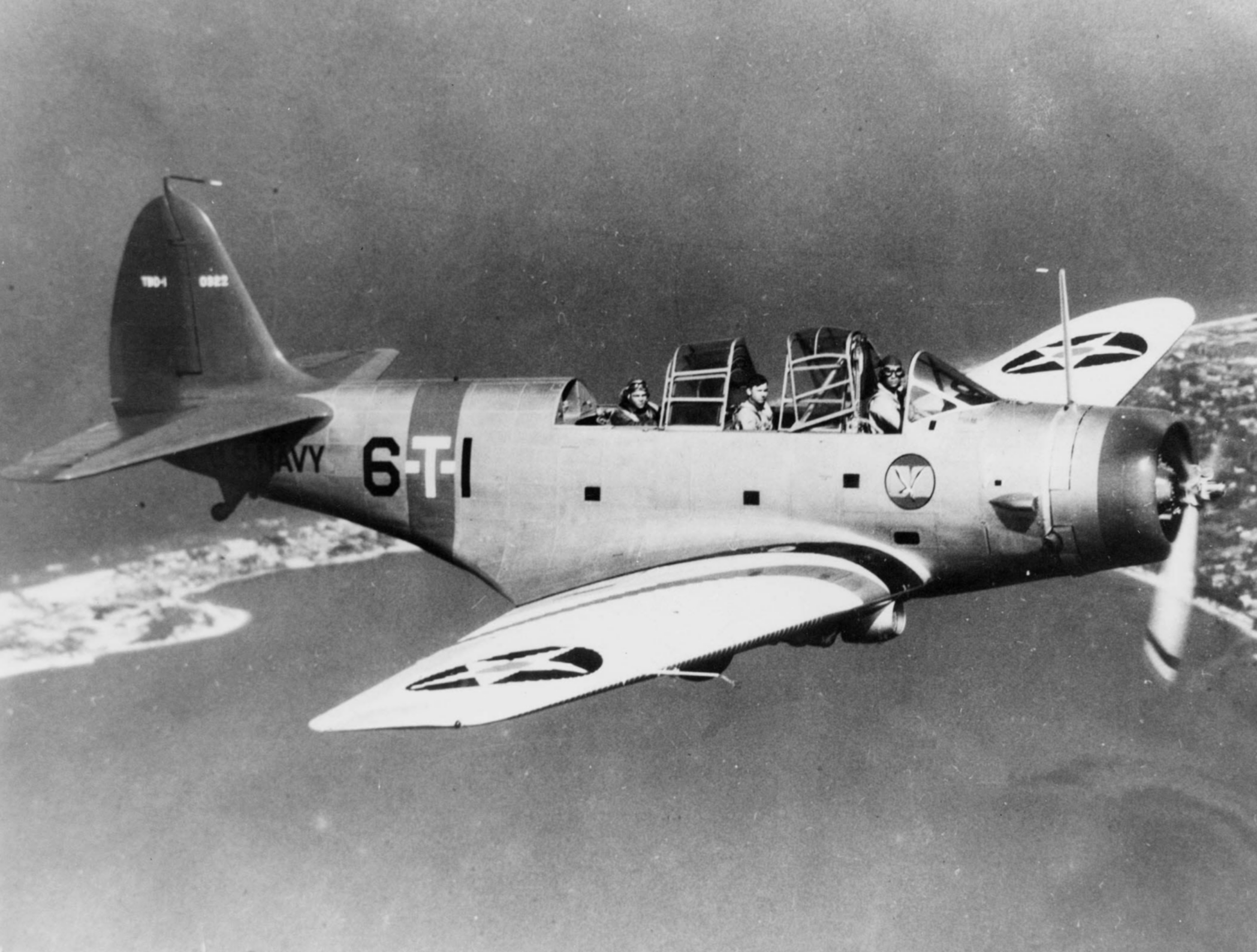
- US Navy TBD-1 Torpedo Squadron Six (VT-6), from USS Enterprise (CV-6), circa 1938

General information
- Type: Torpedo bomber
- National origin: United States
- Manufacturer: Douglas Aircraft Company
- Primary user: United States Navy
- Number built: 130

History
- Manufactured: 1937–1939
- Introduction date: 3 August 1937
- First flight: 15 April 1935
- Retired: 1944

The Douglas TBD Devastator was an American torpedo bomber of the United States Navy. Ordered in 1934, it first flew in 1935 and entered service in 1937. At that point, it was the most advanced aircraft flying for the Navy, being the first metal monoplane in the United States Navy; however, by the time of the US entry into World War 2, the TBD was already outdated.

The Devastator performed well early in the war, most notably in the Battle of the Coral Sea, but earned infamy for a catastrophic performance during the Battle of Midway in which 41 Devastators recorded zero torpedo hits with only six surviving to return to their carriers. Although much of the Devastator's dismal performance was later attributed to the many well-documented defects in the US Mark 13 torpedo, the aircraft was withdrawn from frontline service after Midway, being replaced by the Grumman TBF Avenger.

== Design and development ==
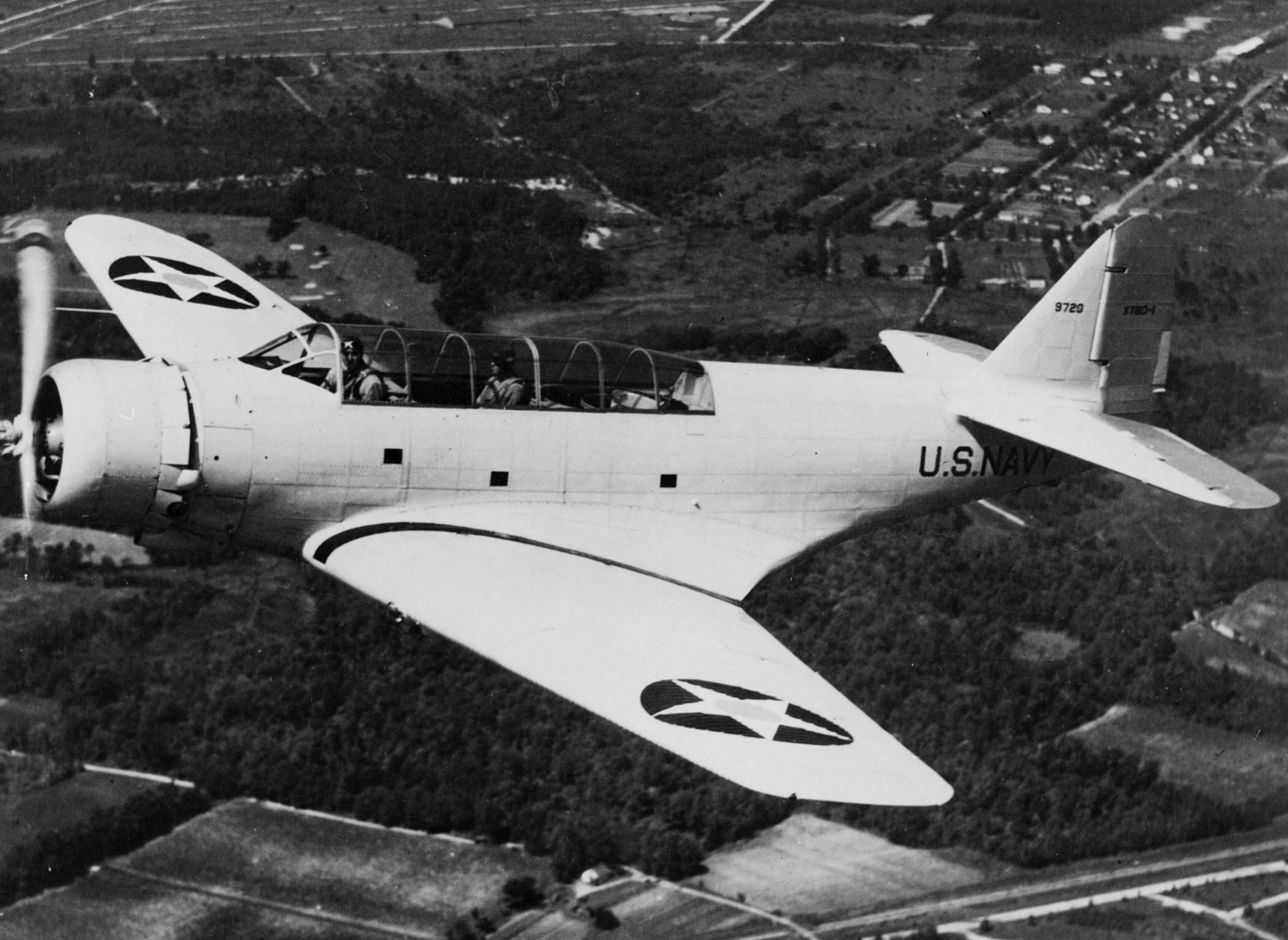
The XTBD-1 with the original flat canopy in 1935

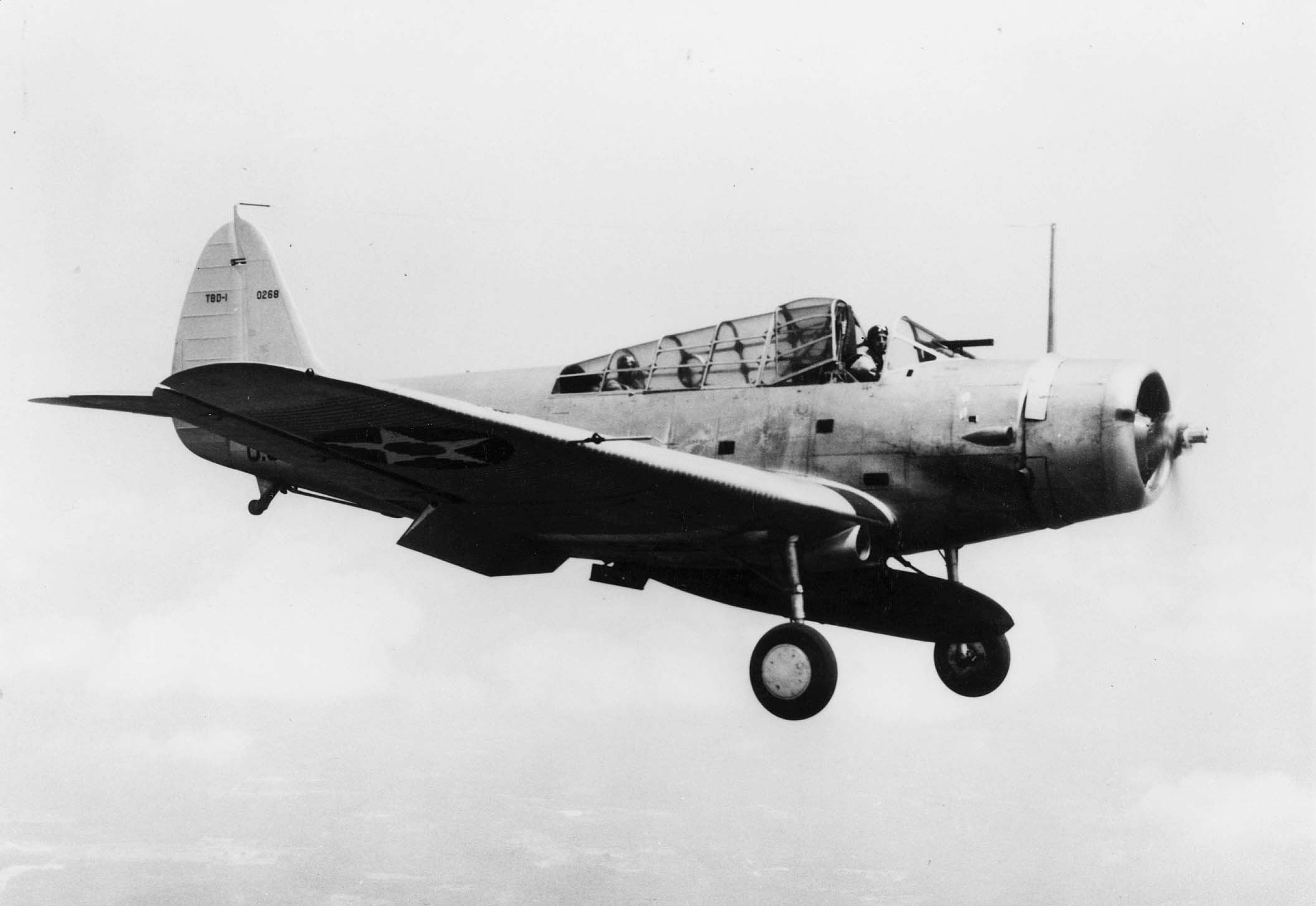
The first production TBD-1 in 1937

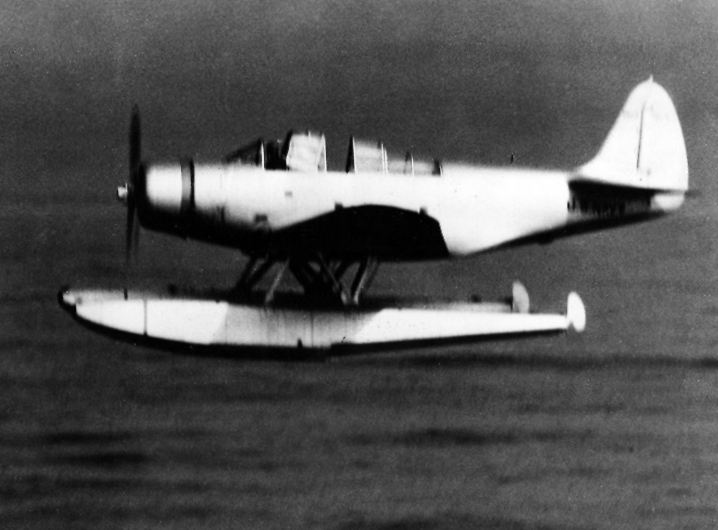
A single TBD-1A was tried as a floatplane

The Douglas XTBD-1 was ordered on 30 June 1934 after being one of the winners of a US Navy competition for new bombers to operate from its aircraft carriers. Other aircraft also ordered for production as a result of the competition included the Brewster SBA, the Vought SB2U Vindicator, and the Northrop BT-1, the last of which would evolve into the Douglas SBD Dauntless. The Great Lakes XB2G, Great Lakes XTBG, Grumman XSBF, Hall XPTBH and Vought XSB3U were also tendered to the specification but were not developed beyond prototype status.

The XTBD Devastator flew for the first time on 15 April 1935 while marking a number of "firsts" for the US Navy. It was the first American carrier-based monoplane to be widely used, the first all-metal naval aircraft, the first with a completely enclosed cockpit, the first with power-actuated (hydraulically) folding wings. A semi-retractable landing gear was fitted, with the wheels protruding 10 in (250 mm) below the wings to potentially limit damage to the aircraft in a "wheels-up" landing. A crew of three was normally carried beneath a large "greenhouse" canopy almost half the length of the aircraft. The pilot sat in front; a rear gunner/radio operator took the rearmost position, while the bombardier occupied the middle seat. During a bombing run, the bombardier lay prone, sliding into position under the pilot to sight through a window in the bottom of the fuselage, using the Norden bombsight.

The normal TBD offensive armament consisted of either a 1,935 lb (878 kg) Mark 13 aerial torpedo or a 1,000 lb (450 kg) bomb carried semi-recessed in the fuselage. Alternatively, three 500 lb (230 kg) general-purpose bombs (one under each wing root and one inside the fuselage), or twelve 100 lb (45 kg) fragmentation bombs (six under each wing root), could be carried. This weapons load would often be used when attacking Japanese targets on the Gilbert and Marshall Islands in 1942. Defensive armament consisted of a .30 in (7.62 mm) Browning machine gun for the rear gunner. Fitted in the starboard side of the cowling was either a .30 in (7.62 mm) or .50 in (12.7 mm) M2 Browning machine gun.

The powerplant was a 850 hp (630 kW) Pratt & Whitney R-1830-64 Twin Wasp radial engine, a development of the prototype's 800 hp (600 kW) Pratt & Whitney XR-1830-60/R-1830-1. Other changes from the 1935 prototype included a revised engine cowling and a raised cockpit canopy to improve visibility.

The XTBD had a flat canopy that was replaced on production models by a higher, domed canopy with a rollover bar. Other than requests by test pilots to improve pilot visibility, the prototype easily passed its acceptance trials that ran from 24 April to 24 November 1935 at NAS (Naval Air Station) Anacostia and Norfolk bases. After successfully completing torpedo drop tests, the prototype was transferred to the Lexington for carrier certification. The extended service trials continued until 1937 with the first two production aircraft retained by the company exclusively for testing.

The US Navy's Bureau of Aeronautics (BuAer) purchased 129 examples, and began to equip the carriers USS Saratoga, Enterprise, Lexington, Wasp, Hornet, Yorktown and Ranger starting in 1937. Even prewar, TBD units were being shifted to training duties with at least one aircraft being converted to target tug duty. By 1940, the US Navy was aware that the TBD had become outclassed and a replacement, the Grumman TBF Avenger, was in the works, but it was not yet operational when the US entered World War II. Attrition had by then reduced their numbers to just over 100 aircraft. When the US Navy assigned popular names to its aircraft in late 1941, the TBD became the Devastator, although its nickname "torpecker" was still commonly used.

== Operational history ==
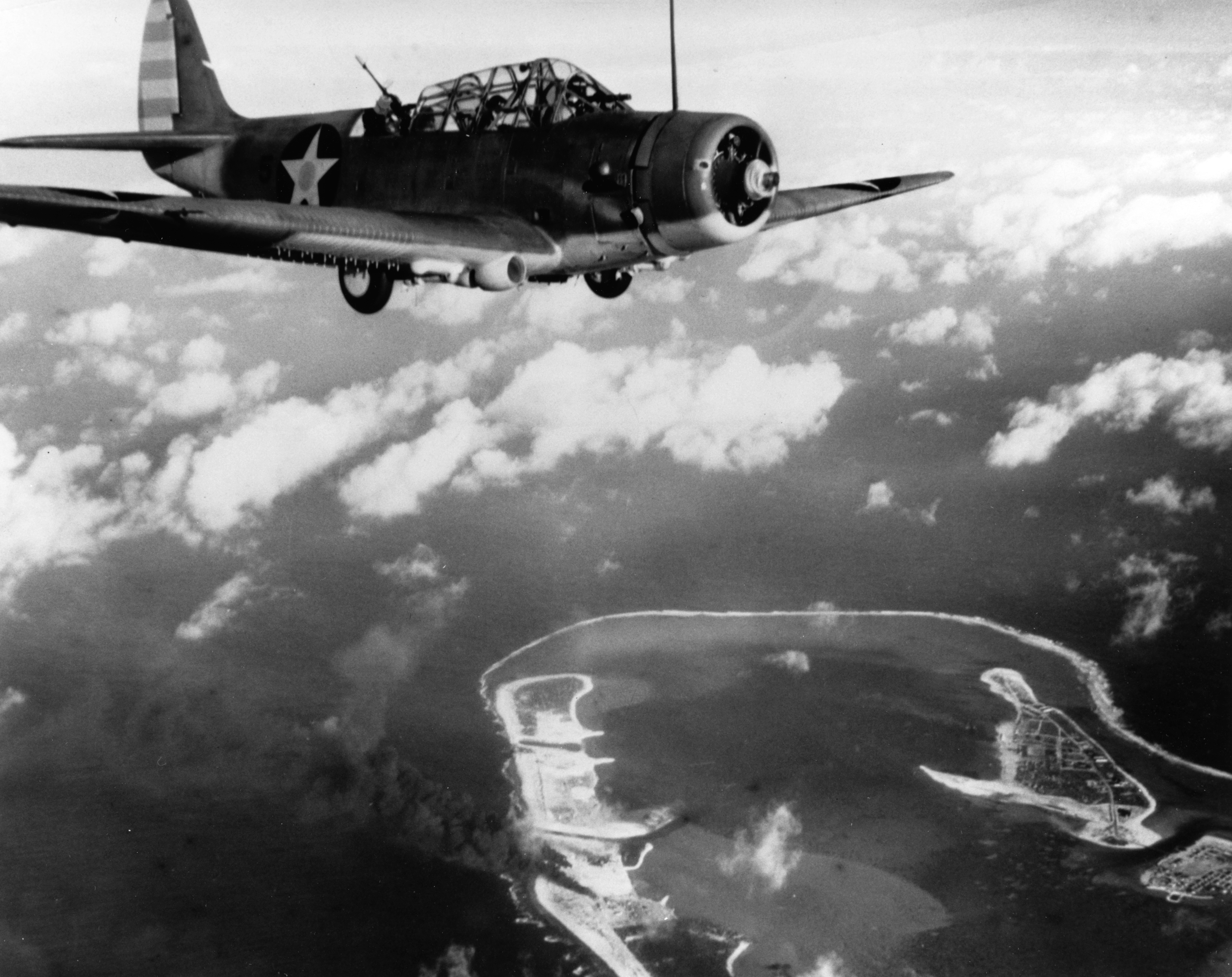
A VT-6 TBD after attacking Wake Island, 24 February 1942

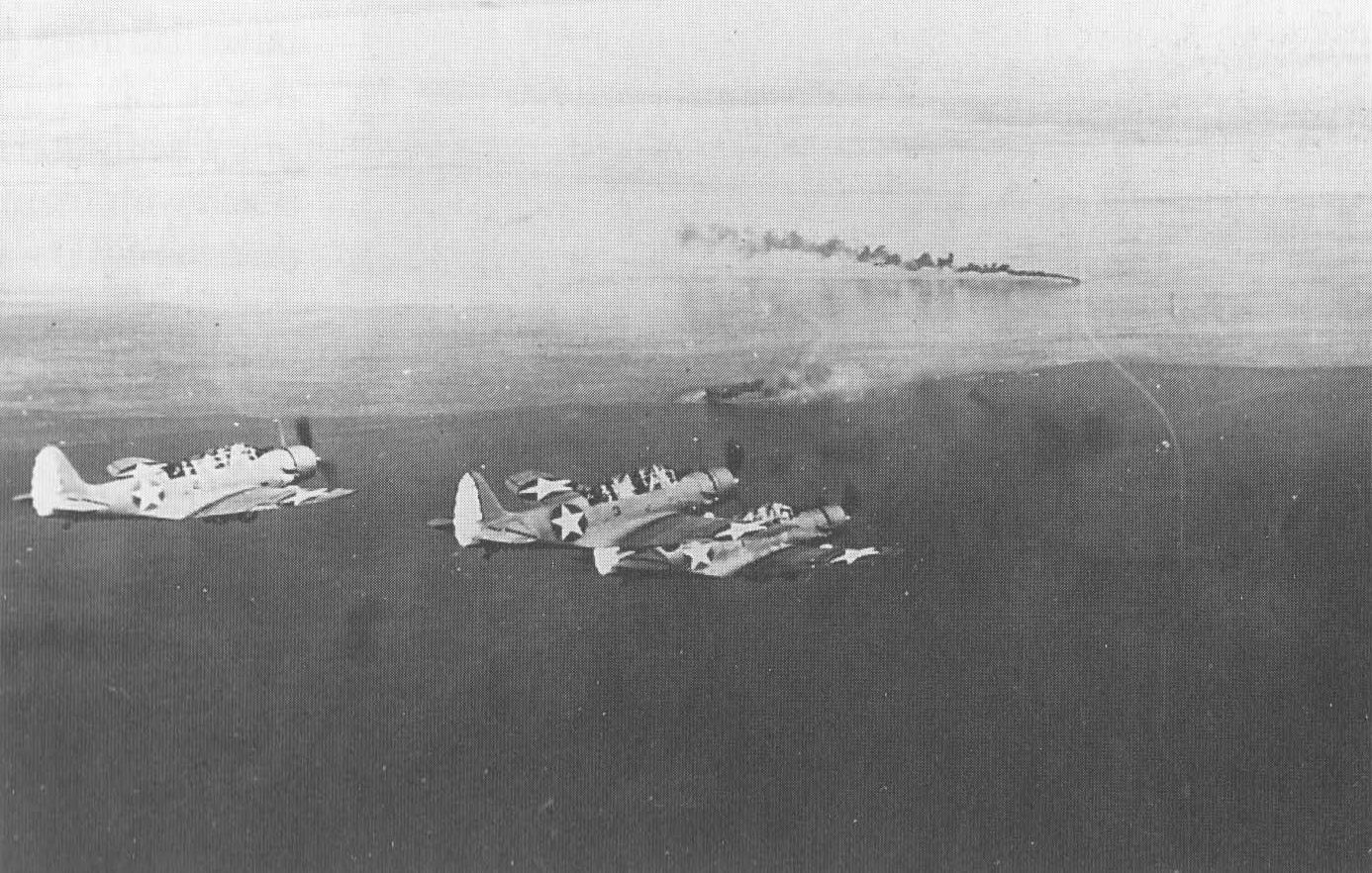
TBDs from VT-5 over the Huon Gulf, 10 March 1942

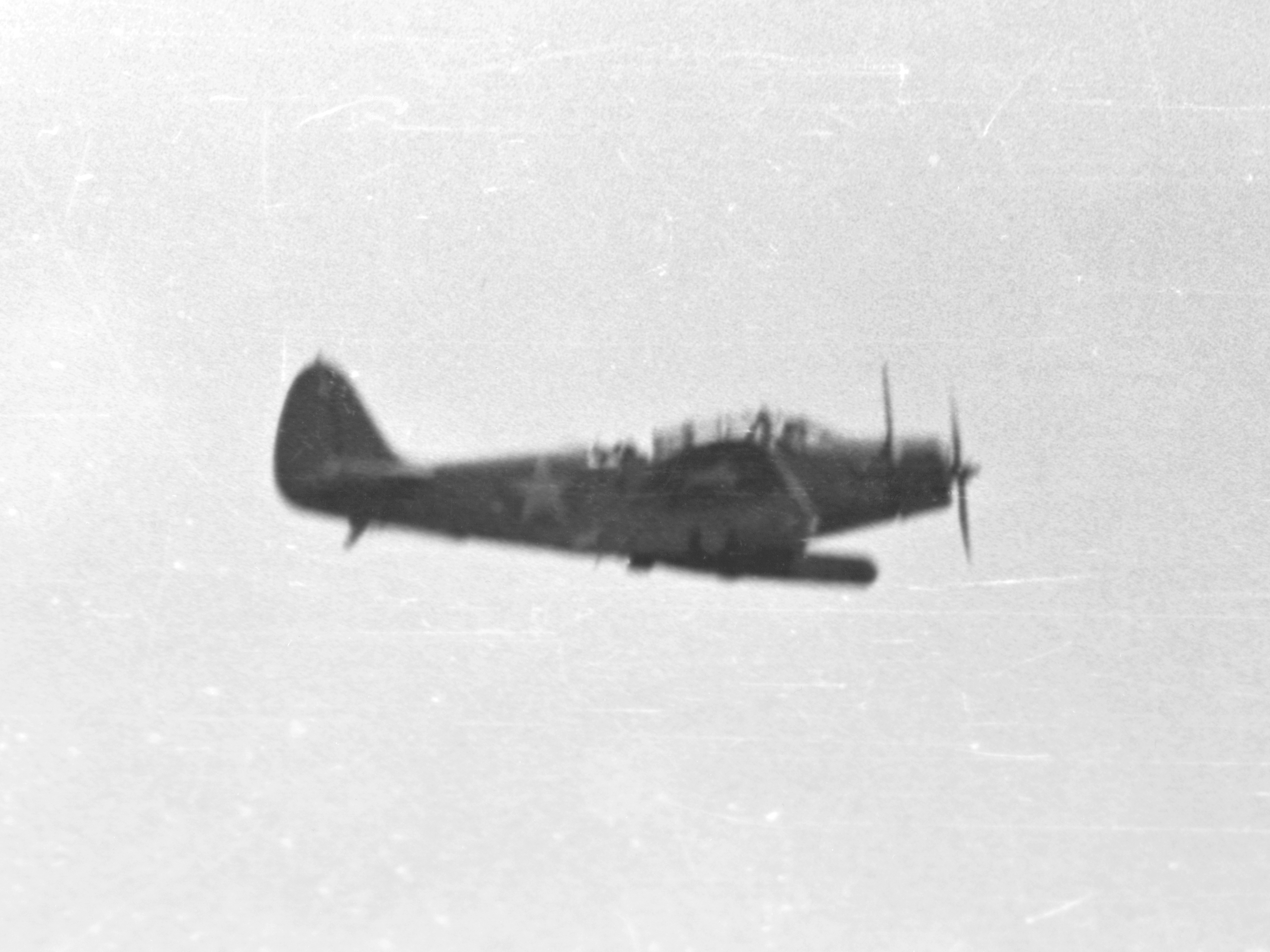
A TBD-1 from VT-3 en route to the Japanese fleet at Midway

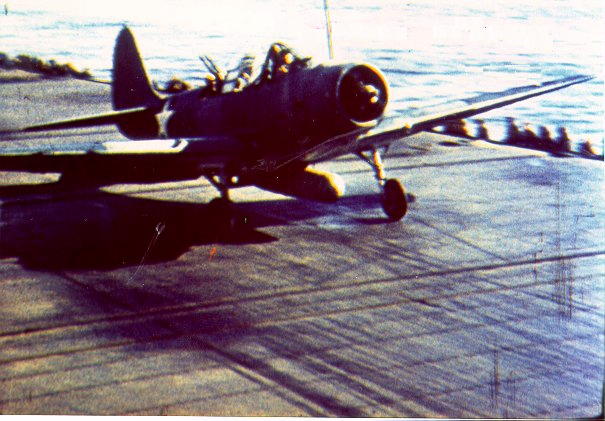
VT-8's "T-16" (BuNo 1506, LCDR John C. Waldron, Horace F. Dobbs CRMP) taking off from USS Hornet, 4 June 1942. The twin .30 caliber machine guns in the rear were unique to VT-8.

In the early days of the Pacific war, the TBD acquitted itself well during February and March 1942, with TBDs from Enterprise and Yorktown attacking targets in the Marshall and Gilbert Islands, Wake and Marcus Islands, while TBDs from Yorktown and Lexington struck Japanese shipping off New Guinea on 10 March. In the Battle of the Coral Sea Devastators helped sink the Japanese aircraft carrier Shōhō on 7 May, but failed to hit another carrier, the Shōkaku, the next day.

Many faults were discovered with the Mark 13 torpedo at this point. Many were seen to hit the target yet failed to explode; there was also a tendency to run deeper than the set depth. It took over a year for the defects to be corrected. These problems were not fixed by the time of the Battle of Midway on 4 June 1942.

At Midway, a total of 41 Devastators, the majority of the type still operational, were launched from Hornet, Enterprise and Yorktown to attack the Japanese fleet. The sorties were not well coordinated, in part because Rear Admiral Raymond A. Spruance ordered a strike on the enemy carriers immediately after they were discovered, rather than spending time assembling a well-coordinated attack involving the different types of aircraft – fighters, bombers, torpedo planes – reasoning that attacking the Japanese would prevent a counterstrike against the US carriers. The TBDs from Hornet and Enterprise lost contact with their escort and started their attacks without fighter protection.

The Devastator proved to be a death trap for its crews: slow and hardly maneuverable, with poor armor for the era; its speed on a glide-bombing approach was a mere 200 mph (320 km/h), making it easy prey for fighters and defensive guns alike. The aerial torpedo could not even be released at speeds above 115 mph (185 km/h). Torpedo delivery requires a long, straight-line attack run, making the aircraft vulnerable, and the slow speed of the aircraft made them easy targets for the Mitsubishi A6M Zeros. Only four TBDs made it back to Enterprise, none to Hornet and two to Yorktown, without scoring a torpedo hit.

Nonetheless, their sacrifice was not completely in vain, as several TBDs managed to get within a few ship-lengths range of their targets before dropping their torpedoes, being close enough to be able to strafe the enemy ships and force the Japanese carriers to take sharp evasive maneuvers. By obliging the Japanese to keep their flight decks clear and to continually cycle and reinforce their combat air patrols, they prevented any Japanese counter-attacks against the American carriers, just as Spruance had anticipated. These windows of opportunity were exploited by the late-arriving Douglas SBD Dauntless dive bombers led by Lieutenant Commanders C. Wade McClusky and Max Leslie, which dive-bombed and fatally damaged three of the four Japanese carriers about one hour after the first TBD torpedo attacks had developed. While the Devastators faced the stiff defenses of the carriers and their fighters, their attacks served to distract the Japanese attention from the Dauntless dive bombers' strikes, resulting in relatively lighter resistance from the IJN carriers' defensive fighter patrols, and more effective American attacks that crippled the IJN carrier forces.

=== Obsolescence ===
The Navy immediately withdrew the 39 remaining TBDs from frontline units after the failure at Midway. The surviving Devastators in VT-4 and VT-7 remained in service briefly in the Atlantic and in training squadrons until 1944. Many were relegated to training duties for pilots and mechanics or were destroyed following use as instructional airframes for firefighting training. By late 1944, no TBD Devastators were left in the US Navy inventory. The original prototype finished its career at NAS Norman, Oklahoma; the last TBD in the US Navy was used by the Commander of Fleet Air Activities-West Coast. When his TBD was scrapped in November 1944, there were no more. None survived the war and there are none known to exist on dry land today.

In fairness to the Devastator, the newer TBF Avengers were similarly ineffective in 1942, losing five out of six aircraft without scoring a hit during the Battle of Midway. The Avengers' only successes in 1942 would be against the light carrier Ryūjō and the battleship Hiei. (Note: The Hiei had already been crippled the night before.) In the initial part of the Pacific War, the poor performance of US torpedo bombers was due to the vulnerability of that type in general against fire from anti-aircraft artillery and defending fighters, plus the inexperience of American pilots and lack of coordinated fighter cover, as well as serious defects in US torpedoes which were not officially corrected until the fall of 1943. It took growing American air superiority, improved attack coordination, and more experienced pilots, before the Avengers were able to successfully accomplish their roles in subsequent battles against Japanese surface forces.

== Variants ==
XTBD-1
Prototype powered by an 800 hp (600 kW) XR-1830-60, one built.
TBD-1
Production variant powered by an 850 hp (630 kW) R-1830-64, 129 built.
TBD-1A
One TBD-1 modified with twin floats. (Note: In 1939, the first production TBD was test flown with floats at Newport, Rhode Island.)

== Operators ==
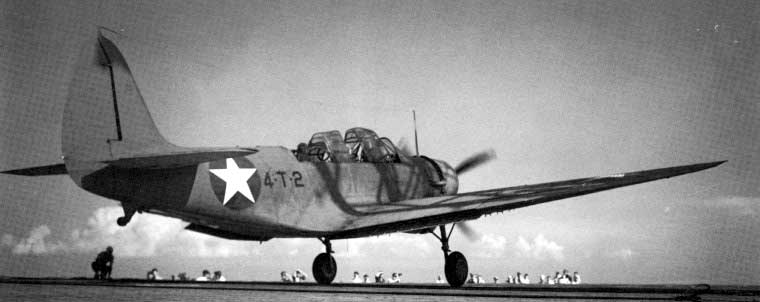
VT-4 TBD-1 taking off from USS Ranger in 1942

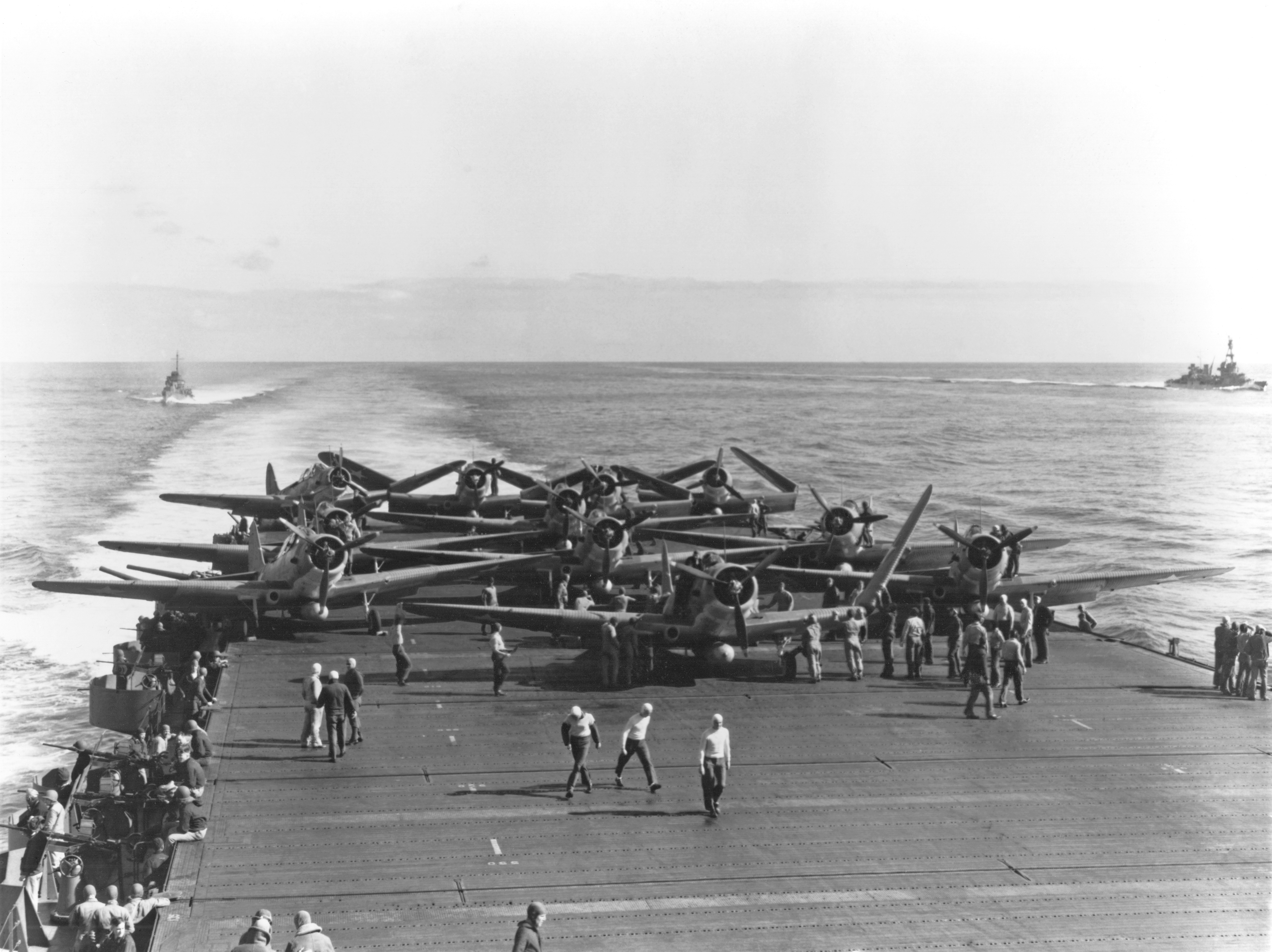
VT-6 TBDs on USS Enterprise, during the Battle of Midway

United States

- United States Navy
  - VT-2 used 58 Devastators between December 1937 and May 1942.
  - VT-3 used 71 Devastators between October 1937 and June 1942. They starred in the 1941 movie Dive Bomber.
  - VT-4 used nine Devastators between December 1941 and September 1942.
  - VT-5 used 57 Devastators between February 1938 and June 1942.
  - VT-6 used 62 Devastators between April 1938 and June 1942.
  - VT-7 used 5 Devastators between January 1942 and July 1942.
  - VT-8 used 23 Devastators between September 1941 and June 1942.
  - VB-4 used three Devastators between December 1941 and January 1942.
  - VS-42 used three Devastators between December 1940 and December 1941.
  - VS-71 used eight Devastators between December 1940 and June 1942.
  - VS-72 used two Devastators in June 1941.
  - VU-3 used a single Devastator from January until May 1940.
- United States Marine Corps
  - VMS-2 used a single Devastator, BuNo. 1518, from 26 March 1941 till 5 June 1941, loaned from VT-3.

== Surviving aircraft ==
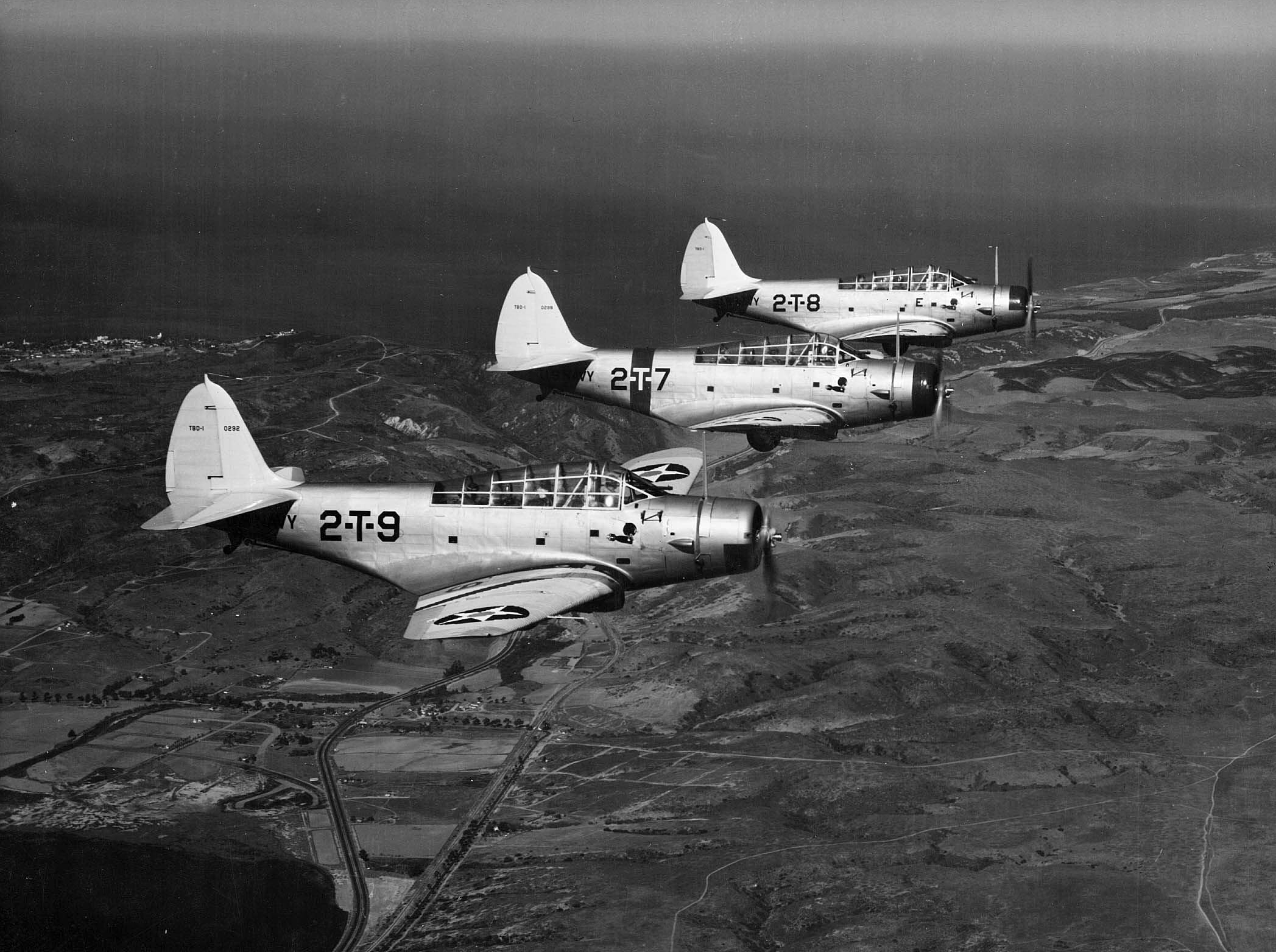
TBD Devastators of VT-2 in flight c. 1938

No TBD’s survive in museums or private collections, nor are there any currently under restoration. As many as 11 aircraft were known to exist underwater in 2004. An expedition has been proposed to recover several TBDs from the wreck of the USS Lexington. These aircraft have varying degrees of intactness due to circumstances of their loss and subsequent saltwater corrosion. For example, the pair at Jaluit, a shallow warm-water atoll, have reef creatures growing on their exteriors; several of those lost at Coral Sea have broken wings and fuselages due to avgas explosions and their free-fall to the deep sea floor.

TBD-1, Bureau Numbers 0298 and 1515
Ex-VT-5 / USS Yorktown (CV-5) "5-T-7", "5-T-6" Jaluit Lagoon, Marshall Islands.

January 30, 2026 the U.S. Naval History and Heritage Command and the Air and Sea Heritage Foundation announced they are working to recover BuNo 1515. The goal is to exhibit the bomber in the future U.S. Navy National Museum, which is under development in Washington D.C. If successful the plan, rather than to restore it, is to stabilize the remains to prevent disintegration in air and display them as if still on the lagoon bottom.

TBD-1 BuNo 0353
Ex-NAS Miami, Atlantic Ocean, Miami, Florida.
TBD-1 BuNo 0377
Ex-VT-2 / USS Lexington (CV-2) "6-T-7", Pacific Ocean, Mission Beach, California.
Wreck of the USS Lexington (CV-2)

On 4 March 2018, Paul G. Allen's R/V Petrel team discovered the wreck of the USS Lexington at 3,000 meters (about two miles) below the surface, resting on the floor of the Coral Sea more than 500 miles off the eastern coast of Australia. Near the wreck were the remains of seven Devastators, as well as an F4F-3 Wildcat. An attempt by A and T Recovery to recover at least four of the wrecks, including the Devastator, is currently underway as of January 2023.

== Replica ==
On 19 September 2019, the USS Midway Museum acquired a 1:1 scale replica used in the World War II movie, Midway. The plane was donated from Lionsgate following the conclusion of filming and will become an exhibit on USS Midway (CV-41)'s hangar.

== Specifications (TBD-1) ==
Douglas TBD-1 Devastator 3-view drawing

Data from Devastator...The Not-so-Devastating TBD-1

General characteristics

- Crew: 3: (Pilot, Torpedo Officer/Navigator, Radioman/Gunner)
- Length: 35 ft 0 in (10.67 m)
- Wingspan: 50 ft 0 in (15.24 m)
- Height: 15 ft 1 in (4.60 m)
- Wing area: 422 sq ft (39.2 m^{2})
- Empty weight: 5,600 lb (2,540 kg)
- Gross weight: 9,289 lb (4,213 kg)
- Max takeoff weight: 10,194 lb (4,624 kg)
- Powerplant: 1 × Pratt & Whitney R-1830-64 Twin Wasp 14-cylinder two-row air-cooled radial piston engine, 900 hp (670 kW)
- Propellers: 3-bladed variable-pitch propeller

Performance

- Maximum speed: 206 mph (332 km/h, 179 kn) at 8,000 ft (2,400 m)
- Cruise speed: 128 mph (206 km/h, 111 kn)
- Range: 435 mi (700 km, 378 nmi) with Mark 13 torpedo or

716 mi (622 nmi; 1,152 km) with 1,000 lb (450 kg) of bombs

- Service ceiling: 19,500 ft (5,900 m)
- Rate of climb: 720 ft/min (3.7 m/s)

Armament

- Guns:
  - 1 × forward-firing 0.30 in (7.62 mm) Browning machine gun or 0.50 in (12.7 mm) Browning machine gun
  - 1 × 0.30 in (7.62 mm) machine gun in rear cockpit
- Bombs:
  - 1 × Mark 13 torpedo or
  - 1 × 1,000 lb (450 kg) bomb or
  - 3 × 500 lb (230 kg) bombs or
  - 12 × 100 lb (45 kg) bombs

== Notable appearance in media ==
Dive Bomber (1941) was an American film directed by Michael Curtiz. It is notable for both its Technicolor photography of pre-World War II United States Navy aircraft featuring the TBD Devastator, and scenes on the aircraft carrier Enterprise as well as the NAS North Island in San Diego.

The 2014 film Against the Sun depicts a real-life story of the survival of a Devastator's crew after it had to ditch due to running out of fuel. The crew survived 34 days adrift.

The 2019 film Midway featured the Devastator, most notably the disastrous attack by VT-8, including its only survivor, Ensign George Gay, using his plane's seat cushion to conceal himself from the Japanese as he watched the SBDs bomb the IJN Carrier force.

== See also ==
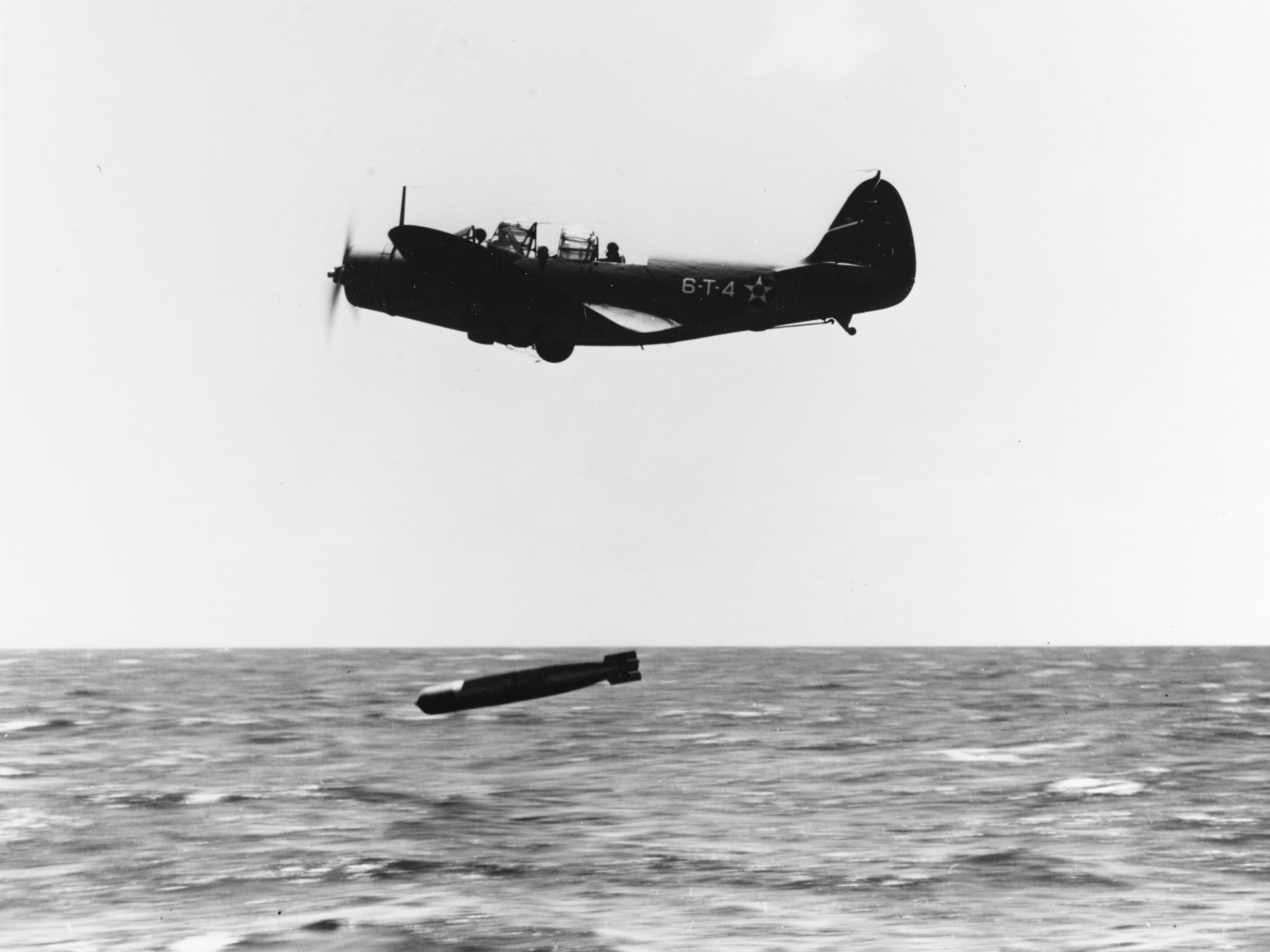
A VT-6 TBD dropping a torpedo in October 1941

Aircraft of comparable role, configuration, and era

- Fairey Albacore
- Fairey Barracuda
- Fieseler Fi 167
- Great Lakes XTBG
- Mitsubishi B5M
- Nakajima B5N

Related lists

- List of aircraft of World War II
- List of United States Navy aircraft designations (pre-1962)
- List of military aircraft of the United States
