= Great Lakes XTBG =

1935 prototype torpedo bomber aircraft model

XTBG-1
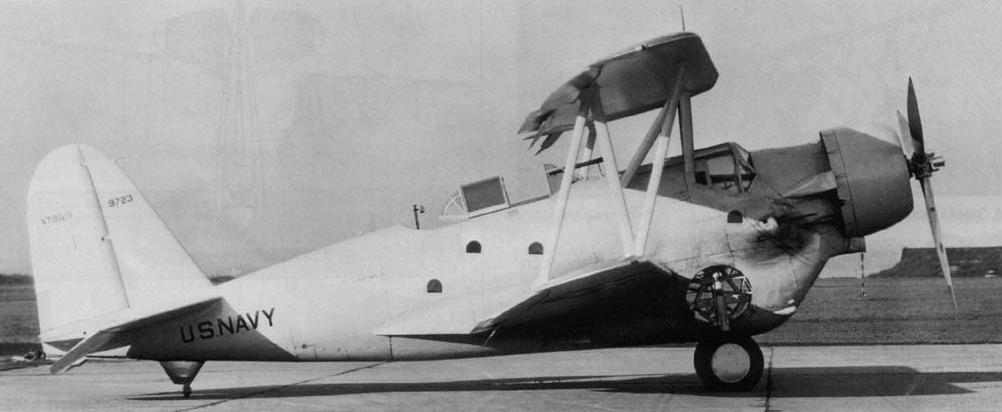

General information
- Type: Torpedo bomber
- Manufacturer: Great Lakes Aircraft Company
- Primary user: United States Navy
- Number built: 1

The Great Lakes XTBG-1 was an American prototype torpedo bomber, intended for service in the United States Navy as part of that service's plan to modernise its aerial striking force in the mid-1930s. The XTBG-1 was outperformed by the competing TBD Devastator, however, in addition to having instability problems and only a single prototype of the three-seat design was constructed during 1935.

== Design ==
Featuring retractable landing gear and a fully enclosed weapons bay for its torpedo, the XTBG-1 had the unusual feature of the torpedo-aimer seated forward of the wing, in a small, enclosed compartment.

== Specifications (XTBG-1) ==
Data from Aero-web

General characteristics

- Crew: 3
- Length: 34 ft 9 in (10.6 m)
- Wingspan: 42 ft 0 in (12.8 m)
- Height: 15 ft 1 in (4.6 m)
- Gross weight: 9,313 lb (4,224 kg)
- Powerplant: 1 × Pratt & Whitney R-1830-60 Twin Wasp 14-cyl. twin row air-cooled radial piston engine, 800 hp (600 kW)

Performance

- Maximum speed: 185 mph (298 km/h, 161 kn)
- Service ceiling: 15,600 ft (4,800 m)

Armament
1 x air-droppable torpedo in an internal weapons bay

== See also ==
Aircraft of comparable role, configuration, and era

- Brewster SBA
- Fairey Swordfish
- Great Lakes XB2G
- Grumman XSBF
- Hall XPTBH
- Northrop BT
- SB2U Vindicator
- TBD Devastator
- Vought XSB3U
- Yokosuka B4Y

Related lists

- List of carrier-based aircraft
- List of United States Navy aircraft designations (pre-1962)
