= VFA-15 =

Strike Fighter Squadron 15
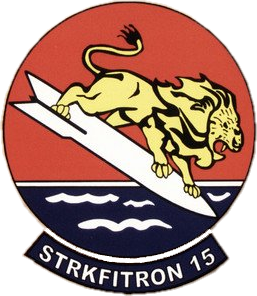
- VFA-15 insignia
- Founded: 10 January 1942; 84 years ago
- Disbanded: 31 May 2017; 9 years ago
- Allegiance: United States
- Branch: United States Navy
- Type: Fighter/Attack
- Role: Close air support Air interdiction Aerial reconnaissance
- Nickname: Valions
- Motto: None Finer
- Engagements: Vietnam War; Operation Fluid Drive; Operation Urgent Fury; Multinational Force in Lebanon; Gulf War; Operation Deny Flight; Operation Deliberate Force; Operation Southern Watch; Operation Allied Force; Operation Enduring Freedom; Iraq War

Aircraft flown
- Attack: A-7 Corsair II; F/A-18 Hornet

Strike Fighter Squadron 15 (VFA-15) was an aviation unit of the United States Navy, based at Naval Air Station Oceana. The squadron was in service from 1 August 1968 to 31 May 2017, although the squadron had adopted the traditions of the first VA-15, which was established on 10 January 1942. The unit's nickname was "Valions" and its call sign was Pride.

== History ==
Two distinct squadrons have been called the "Valions". Officially, the US Navy does not recognize a direct lineage with disestablished squadrons if a new squadron is formed with the same designation. Often, the new squadron will assume the nickname, insignia, and traditions of the earlier squadrons. The first VA-15 was established on 10 January 1942 and disestablished on 1 June 1969.

=== 1960s ===
On 1 June 1969 after the first VA-15 was disestablished, the men and equipment were merged with Attack Squadron 67 (VA-67), which had been established on 1 August 1968. On 2 June 1969, the combined squadron was redesignated VA-15 and adopted the insignia and traditions of the Valions. In August 1968, the squadron began training under VA-174 in the A-7 Corsair II.

=== 1970s ===
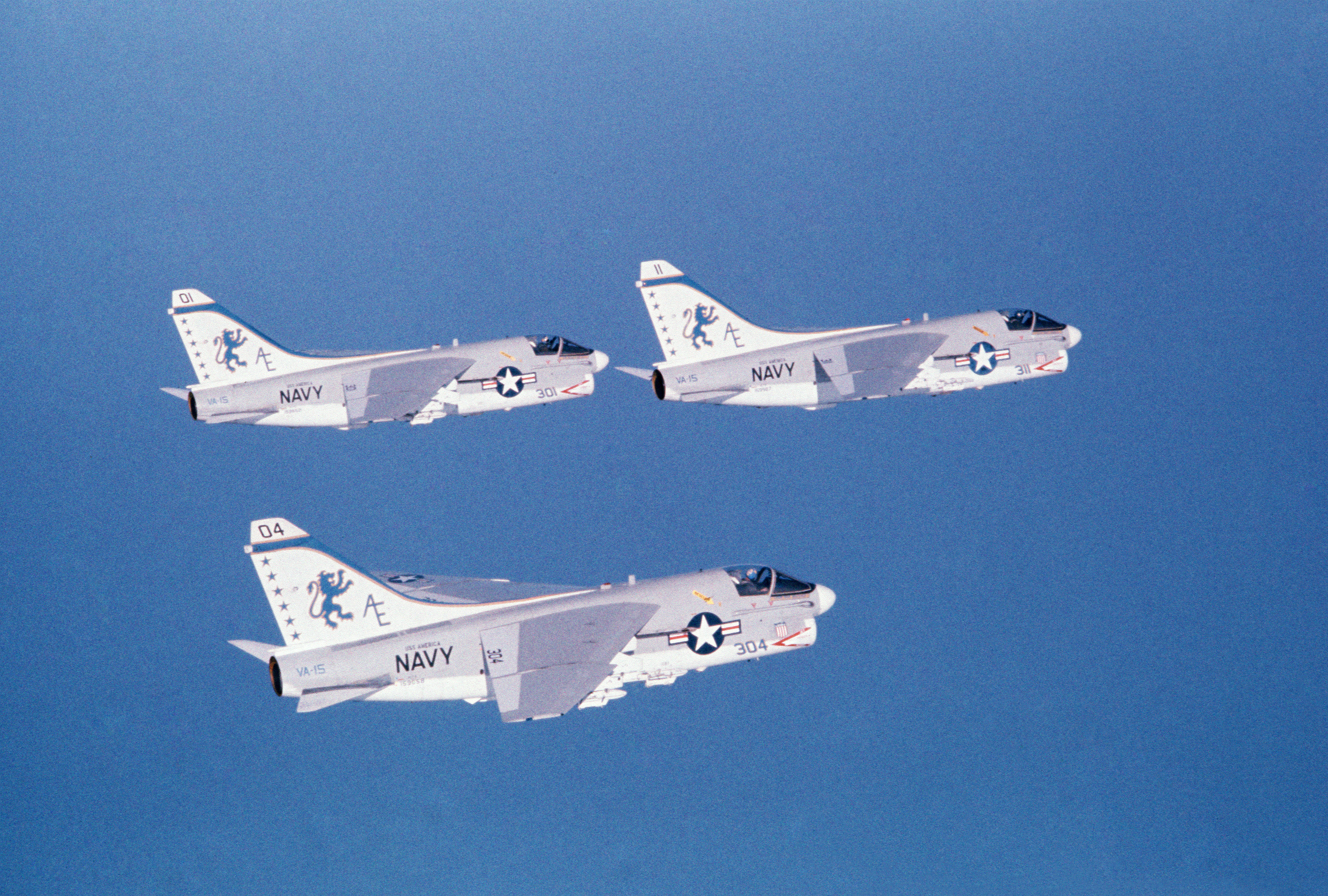
VA-15 A-7Es in 1976

In October–November 1973 while embarked on USS Franklin D. Roosevelt, the squadron operated in the vicinity of Crete in response to the Yom Kippur War. In June–July 1976 following the assassination of the American Ambassador to Lebanon, VA-15 embarked on USS America operated in the vicinity of Lebanon in support of the evacuation of non-combatants.

=== 1980s ===
In November 1980, the squadron, embarked on USS Independence were on station when the American hostages were released from Iran.

In May 1981 USS Independence transited the Suez Canal and maintained station in the eastern Mediterranean due to the crisis between Israel and Syria following Israeli raids against Syrian surface-to-air missile sites in Lebanon.

In October–November 1983, VA-15 aircraft flew combat close air support and reconnaissance sorties in support of Operation Urgent Fury, the U.S. invasion of Grenada.

On 4 December 1983, in response to hostile fire against U.S. reconnaissance aircraft from Syrian positions in Lebanon, VA-15 aircraft participated in coordinated strikes against Syrian radar, communications and artillery positions overlooking the Multi-National Peacekeeping Forces. One of the squadron's A-7E Corsair IIs, flown by the air wing commander, Commander Edward Andrews, was lost when it was hit by a Syrian surface-to-air missile. Commander Andrews ejected, was rescued and returned to USS Independence.

From December 1985 to June 1986 the squadron was assigned to Marine Aircraft Group 12, 1st Marine Air Wing for a six-month deployment to MCAS Iwakuni, Japan. This deployment was designed to test the enhanced interoperability between Marine and Navy squadrons, with emphasis on close air support for Marine ground operations and the sharing of other techniques used by both communities. The squadron participated in Operation "Team Spirit" in Korea.

In June 1986, the squadron began transition training in the F/A-18 Hornet, and on 1 October 1986, VA-15 was redesignated Strike Fighter Squadron 15 (VFA-15). The squadron accepted their first F/A-18 Hornet in January 1987.

=== 1990s ===
On 28 December 1990, VFA-15 departed for a six-month deployment to the Persian Gulf in support of Operation Desert Shield. The squadron flew daily strikes into Iraq and occupied Kuwait until the suspension of hostilities on 28 February. During 1992, VFA-15 transitioned to the F/A-18C Hornet. In 1993, VFA-15 deployed again with CVW-8 on board USS Theodore Roosevelt. They operated in the Adriatic Sea participating in Operation Provide Promise (March - April 1993) and Operation Deny Flight (April - May 1993) over Bosnia. They, then, transited with Theodore Roosevelt to the Red Sea to conduct operations in support of Operation Southern Watch. They returned to home port with Theodore Roosevelt in September 1993.

In March 1999, VFA-15 departed for a deployment which would involve two theaters of operation. After crossing the Atlantic in record time aboard Theodore Roosevelt, squadron aircraft were launched in support of Operation Allied Force 30 August to 20 September 1999. For the next thirteen weeks, VFA-15 flew over 1,100 combat sorties over Kosovo to bring an end to Serbian ethnic cleansing. The battle group then steamed to the Persian Gulf and supported Operation Southern Watch. Upon their return, the squadron made a homeport change to NAS Oceana due to the closure of NAS Cecil Field.

=== 2000s ===
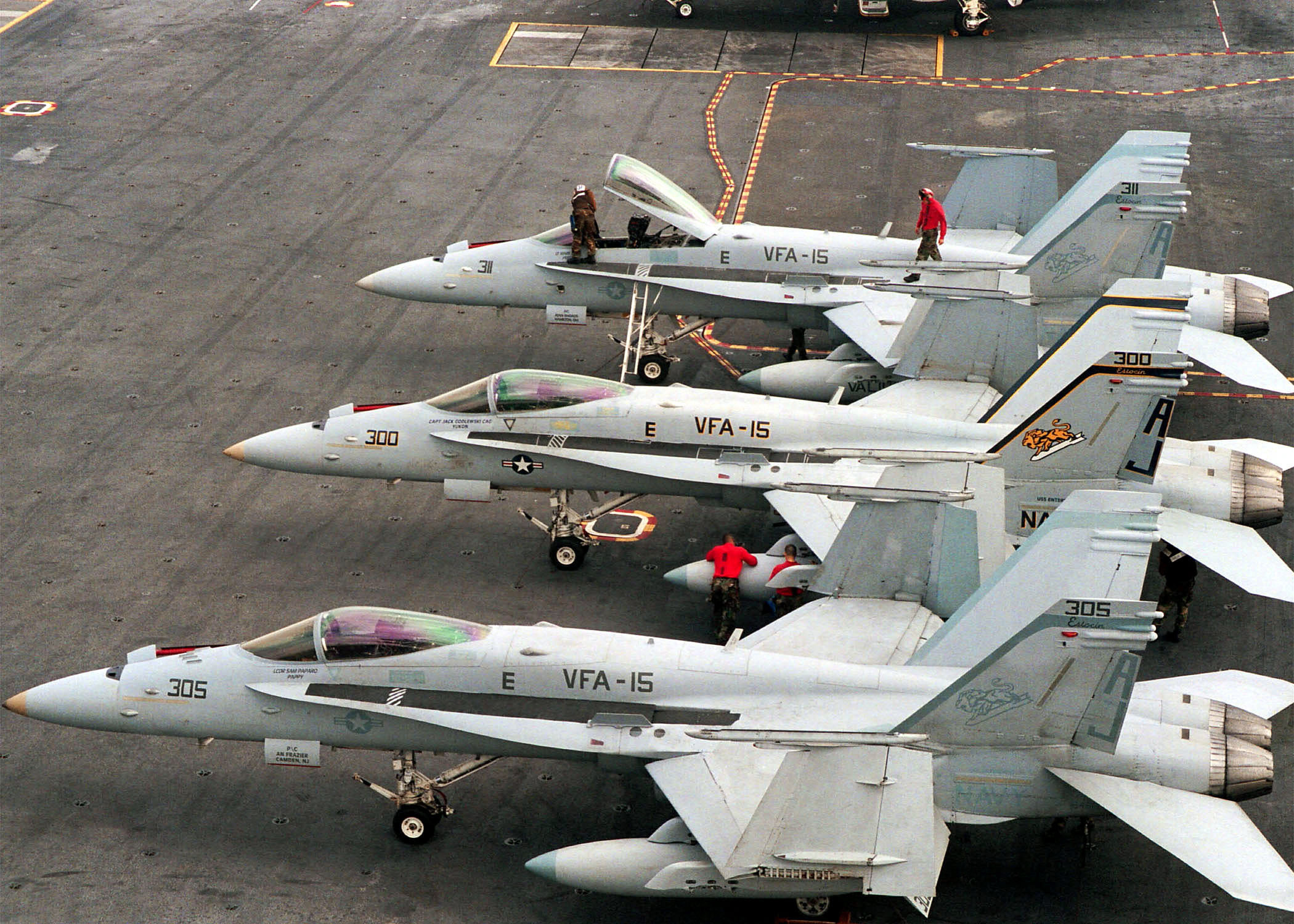
VFA-15 F/A-18s on USS Enterprise in 2000

During their 2001 deployment, the squadron took station in the Persian Gulf, patrolling the skies of the southern Iraqi no-fly zone.

Soon after returning through the Strait of Hormuz in early fall 2001 to begin the voyage home, the September 11 attacks unfolded. For the next four weeks VFA-15 took station in the North Indian Ocean and prepared for combat, with flight operations in support of Operation Enduring Freedom (OEF), including combat air patrols over Pakistan. Missions into Afghanistan began on 7 October, and over the next several weeks the squadron flew four to eight-hour missions deep into Afghanistan.

In 2002, VFA-15 deployed on USS Theodore Roosevelt to the Mediterranean. In support of the US invasion of Iraq, from 19 March to 15 April 2003, the squadron delivered over 245,000 pounds of ordnance.

In September 2005 the squadron deployed to the Persian Gulf, returning on 11 March 2006. On 8 September 2008 the squadron deployed again to the Persian Gulf in support of OEF. They returned 18 April 2009.

=== 2010s ===
On 11 May 2011, the squadrons of CVW-8 embarked on USS George H.W. Bush's maiden deployment, scheduled to conduct operations in the US 5th and 6th Fleet areas of operations. Upon return from deployment, the squadron was awarded the Commander, Naval Air Forces Atlantic Battle "E" Award as the dominant Strike Fighter Squadron on the East Coast.

In February 2016, plans were announced to deactivate VFA-15 in FY 2017. The deactivation ceremony took place on 31 May 2017 and the squadron was deactivated on the same day.

== See also ==
- Naval aviation
- Modern US Navy carrier air operations
- List of United States Navy aircraft squadrons
- List of inactive United States Navy aircraft squadrons

== Bibliography ==
- Thomas, Gerald W. Torpedo Squadron Four: a Cockpit View of World War II. Las Cruces, New Mexico: Rio Grande Historical Collection (New Mexico State University), 1991 (2nd impression, with corrections; first published July 1990).
- [Thomas, Gerald W. Torpedo Squadron Four: a Cockpit View of World War II. Doc45 Publications, 2011 (Revised Edition)]
