= VA-15 (U.S. Navy) =

Attack Squadron 15
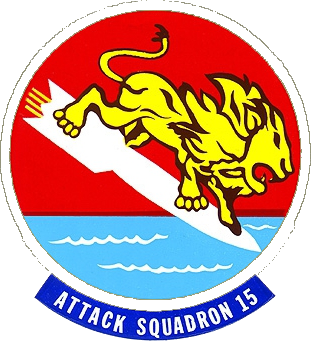
- Active: 10 January 1942 - 1 June 1969
- Country: United States
- Branch: United States Navy
- Type: Attack
- Engagements: World War II; Vietnam War

Aircraft flown
- Attack: TBD-1 Devastator; TBF-1 Avenger; A-1 Skyraider; A-4 Skyhawk

Attack Squadron 15 (VA-15), nicknamed the Valions, was an aviation unit of the United States Navy. It was established as Torpedo Squadron 4 (VT-4) on 10 January 1942, redesignated VA-2A on 15 November 1946, and finally redesignated VA-15 on 2 August 1948. The squadron was disestablished on 1 June 1969, after 27 years of service.

== Operational history ==
=== World War II ===
- 10 January 1942: Torpedo Squadron FOUR (VT-4) was established aboard USS Ranger while the ship was in port at Grassy Bay, Bermuda.The squadron initially flew the TBD Devastator and was assigned to protect the sea lanes between Bermuda and Newfoundland from their homeport of Naval Air Station Quonset Point, Rhode Island.
- August 1942, VT-4 transitioned from the TBD to the TBF Avenger.

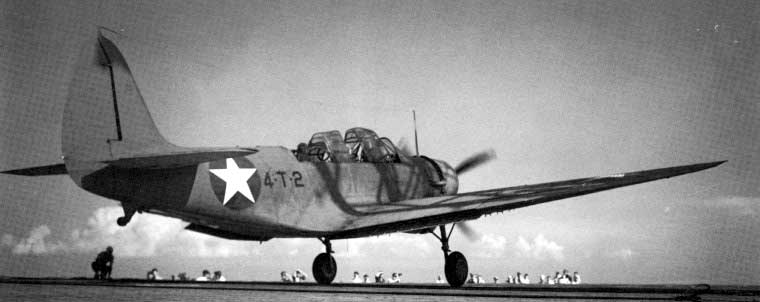
A VT-4 TBD-1 taking off from USS Ranger in 1942.

- 8 August 1943: Ranger, with VT-4 aboard, met the convoy with the liner Queen Mary, which was bringing Winston Churchill to North America for the Quebec Conference.
- August–November 1943: VT-4, while deployed aboard Ranger, operated as part of the British Home Fleet.
- 4 October 1943: The squadron participated in Operation Leader and struck at shipping targets around Kunna Head, Norway, while other elements of CVG-4 struck targets at Bodø, Norway. The squadron's TBF-1s, along with its escort of F4Fs, destroyed a German freighter and a small coaster and damaged a troop transport.
- October 1943: VT-4, flying from Ranger, operated with the British Second Battle Squadron and patrolled the waters of the Norwegian Sea.
- 1 May 1944: CVG-4 reformed as a spare air group with a composition that was designed to include 36 fighter aircraft (F6F), 36 scout-bomber aircraft (SB2C) and 18 torpedo aircraft (TBF/TBM). This air group composition was organized to operate from the large deck carriers of the Essex class. Squadrons in CVG-4 included VT-4, VF-4 and VB-4. This change also brought an end to Air Group FOUR's operations aboard Ranger.

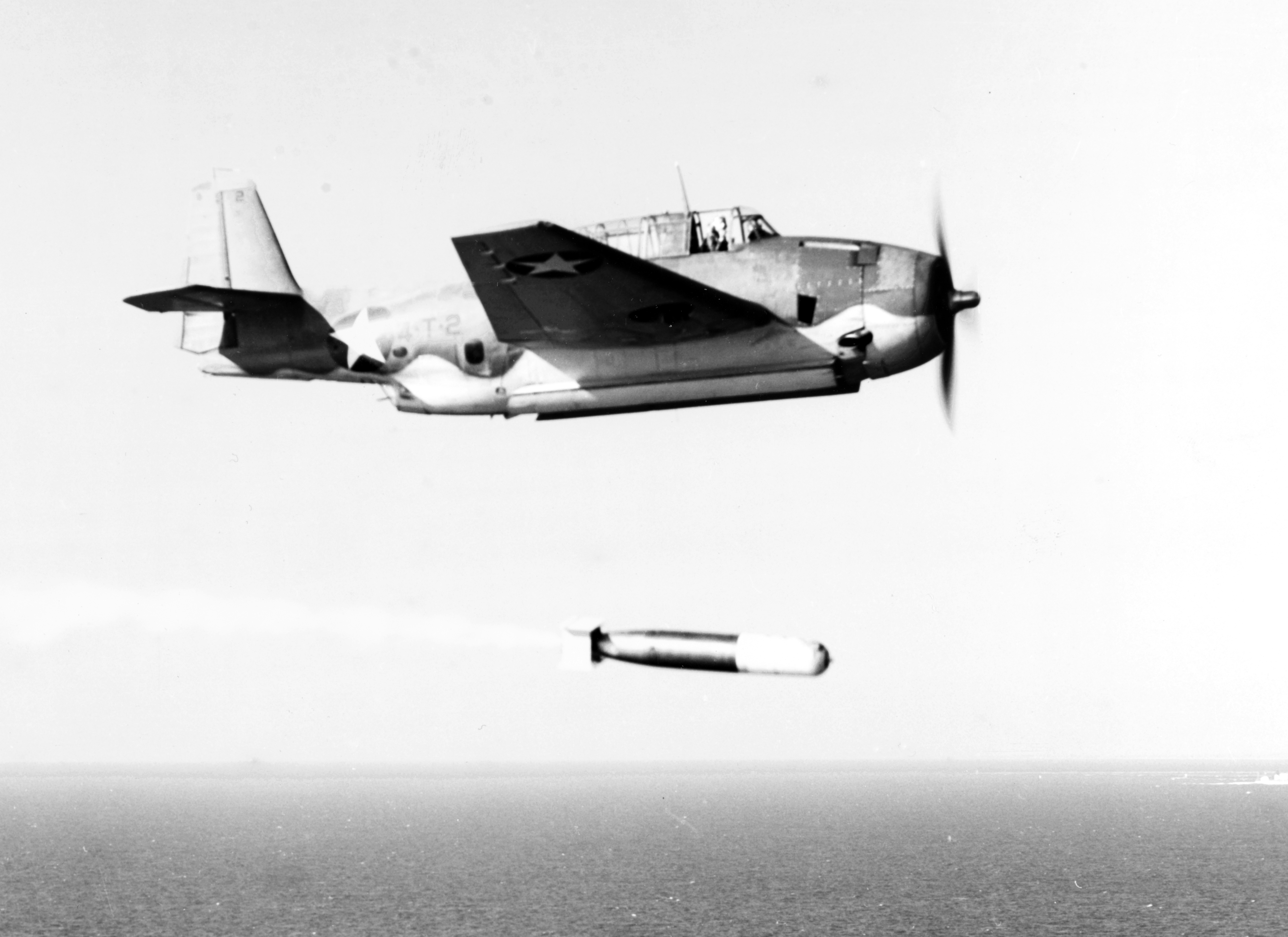
A VT-4 TBF-1 Avenger dropping a torpedo.

- July 1944: VT-4 and CVG-4 transferred from Atlantic to Pacific Fleet.
- 15–21 July 1944: VT-4 aboard USS Barnes en route to Pearl Harbor from San Diego.
- 21 September 1944: During a pre-dawn sortie involving simulated torpedo tactics, three of the squadron's aircraft collided with each other, resulting in the loss of nine personnel, including the squadron's commanding officer, Lieutenant Commander Homer H. Hutcheson.
- 4–17 November 1944: CVG-4 and VT-4 were temporarily embarked on USS Bunker Hill for operations in support of landings at Leyte. The squadron participated in combat strikes at Ormoc Bay, Cavite and Clark Field.
- December 1944: The squadron participated in combat operations in support of landings on Mindoro.
- January 1945: While operating from USS Essex, the squadron struck targets on Formosa, Luzon, Hainan and the Ryukyu Island chain as well as in French Indochina (Vietnam). Operations in Vietnam were around Saigon and Camranh Bay. These operations were in support of the continued assault against the Japanese in the Philippines.
- 16 February 1945: The squadron conducted its first strikes against the home islands of Japan, hitting Mawatari airfield on Honshu. Other strikes against targets on Honshu were conducted on 17 and 25 February.
- 19–22 February 1945: CVG-4 provided support for the Battle of Iwo Jima.
- 1 March 1945: The airfield, facilities and shipping at Naha, Okinawa, were hit by squadron aircraft.
- 4 March 1945: VT-4 disembarked from Essex at Ulithi, completing the squadron's last combat cruise during World War II.
- 9–23 March 1945: CVG-4 aboard USS Long Island for passage from Ulithi to Pearl Harbor. VT-4 eventually returned to the States in April 1945 for reforming following its combat cruise.

=== Postwar ===
- 15 February–15 April 1946: VT-4 along with other squadrons in CVG-4 participated in USS Tarawa's shakedown cruise in the Caribbean Sea following the ship's commissioning in December 1945.
- November 1946: Some squadron aircraft were fitted with sonobuoy gear and personnel were trained in antisubmarine missions as well as their normal torpedo-attack requirements.
- March 1949: the squadron moved to NAS Cecil Field, Florida and transitioned to the AD Skyraider.

=== 1950s ===
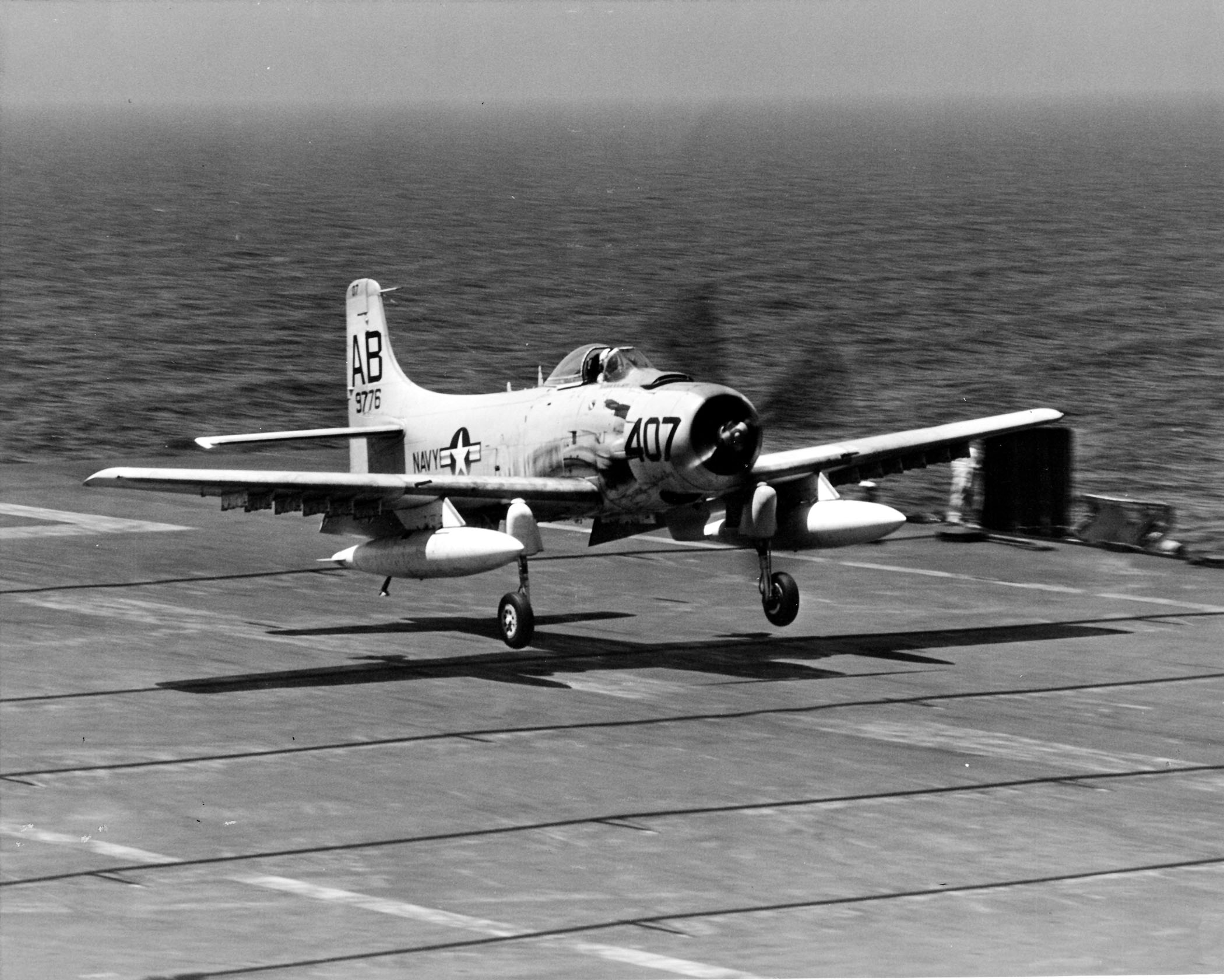
VA-15 AD-6 landing on the USS Forrestal in 1957

- 22 May 1950: VA-15, along with the other squadrons in CVG-1, were designated as training squadrons and CVG-1 as a training air group. The squadron's primary mission was the training of fleet pilots in attack aircraft. VA-15's training syllabus emphasized glide bombing, dive-bombing, rocket firing, day-and-night tactics and carrier qualifications in the AD Skyraider.
- 19 September 1951: the CNO approved the squadron insignia, which was a modification of an earlier one depicting a lion riding a torpedo. The lion was retained to represent the strong attack capabilities of the squadron and the torpedo was replaced by a missile.
- 13–23 September 1952: VA-15, while deployed aboard USS Wasp, participated in the first NATO naval operation, Operation Mainbrace, conducted in the North Atlantic.
- February 1955: While deployed aboard USS Midway, the squadron supported the evacuation of Chinese Nationalist civilians and military personnel from the Tachen Islands which were being bombarded by the People's Republic of China.
- November–December 1956: As a result of the Suez Crisis, VA-15 deployed aboard USS Forrestal and operated in the vicinity of the Azores.
- 12 Sep 1958: VA-15 was assigned the additional mission of Aerial refuelling.

=== 1960s ===
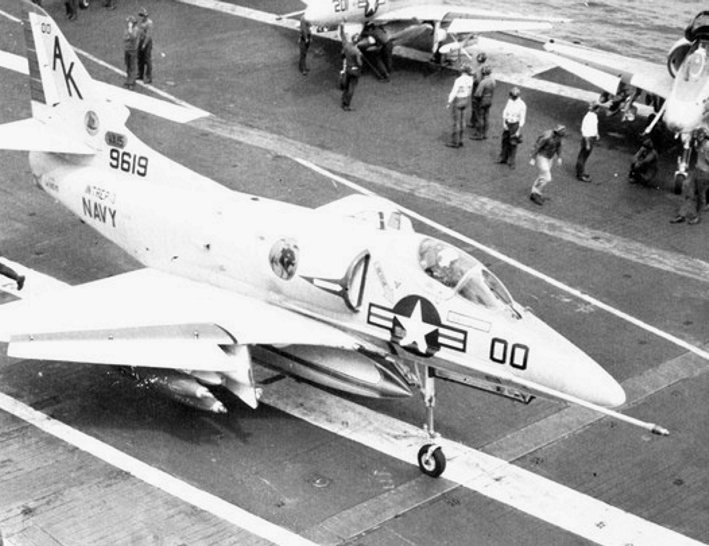
A VA-15 A-4C aboard USS Intrepid in 1967.

- 14–28 November 1960: VA-15, temporarily assigned to CVG-10, deployed aboard USS Shangri-La to the Caribbean Sea to guard against possible infiltration into Guatemala and Nicaragua by insurgent organizations that were believed to have ties to Cuba.
- 21–27 November 1961: VA-15, embarked on USS Franklin D. Roosevelt, operated off the coast of the Dominican Republic to support the newly established democratic government.
- March–April 1962: VA-15 deployed aboard USS Enterprise to the Caribbean and participated in the shakedown cruise of the world's first nuclear powered carrier.
- August 1965: Although scheduled to transition to the A-6 Intruder, VA-15 began training under VA-44 for transition to the Douglas A-4 Skyhawk.
- 4 April–21 November 1966: VA-15 deployed to Vietnam as a component of CVW-10 embarked on USS Intrepid. CVW-10 was an all-attack air wing composed of four attack squadrons, two squadrons flying A-4 Skyhawks and two squadrons with A-1 Skyraiders.
- 15 May 1966: The squadron flew its first combat mission since March 1945 when it was designated VT- 4 and a member of Carrier Air Group 4.
- 1967: VA-15 again returned to Southeast Asia on the USS Intrepid
- 1968-9: the squadron deployed to the Mediterranean on USS Forrestal after she was restored from the disastrous fire.

== Home port assignments ==
The squadron was assigned to these home ports, effective on the dates shown:

- NAS Norfolk – Mar 1942
- NAS Quonset Point – Apr 1942
- NAAF Ayer (Fort Devens) – May 1944
- NAS Pearl Harbor – Jul 1944
- NAS Hilo – Aug 1944
- NAS Alameda – Apr 1945
- NAAS Watsonville – 21 May 1945
- NAS Quonset Point – 11 Jul 1945
- NAAF Groton – Aug 1945
- NAS Norfolk – Apr 1946
- NAS San Diego – 15 Jul 1946
- NAAS Cecil Field – 21 Mar 1949
- NAS Jacksonville – 09 Jan 1950
- NAAS Cecil Field – 29 Feb 1952
- NAS Jacksonville – Jul 1957
- NAS Oceana – Apr 1965
- NAS Cecil Field – Aug 1965

== Aircraft assignment ==
The squadron was assigned the following aircraft in the months shown:

- Douglas TBD-1 Devastator – Jan 1942
- Grumman TBF-1 Avenger – Aug 1942
- Grumman TBF-1C/TBM-1C Avenger – Jan 1944
- Grumman TBM-3 Avenger – Jan 1945
- Grumman TBM-3E Avenger – May 1945
- Grumman TBM-3Q Avenger – 1946
- Douglas AD-4 Skyraider – 19 Aug 1949
- Douglas AD-4L Skyraider – 08 Mar 1951
- Douglas AD-6/AD-1H Skyraider – May 1954
- Douglas A-4B Skyhawk – Dec 1965
- Douglas A-4C Skyhawk – Dec 1966
- Douglas A-4E Skyhawk – Dec 1967

== See also ==
- Attack aircraft
- History of the United States Navy
- List of inactive United States Navy aircraft squadrons
