= Scout plane =

US Navy aircraft type

A scout is a type of United States Navy aircraft whose name derives from the scout cruisers used by the US Navy for similar roles, including screening (escorting) the fleet against enemy forces and was often combined with other roles, such as artillery spotting, reconnaissance and bombing to which the role is often conflated.

Scouts first made their appearances during World War I. The United Kingdom's Royal Naval Air Service, keen on developing the new medium of aerial warfare, converted a number of vessels as seaplane tenders for scouting purposes. Similarly, battleships began to mount short flight decks on top of gun turrets, enabling small single seat aircraft to take-off from them. Initially these single-seater "scouts", having no floats to land on and having no landing deck to return to, either had to find dry land for landing, or else had to ditch onto the sea. During World War I, other more satisfactory (although still clumsy) solutions had been found, in which turret platforms, and later (when aircraft got heavier) catapults were mounted on battleships, cruisers and seaplane tenders, used to launch scout planes. These aircraft never carried radios and rarely had cameras but could carry bombs, or could be armed to intercept enemy aircraft.

Meanwhile, the aircraft carriers were also introduced, and these initially carried similar scouts, but eventually distinguished this function from other roles, such as "scout bombers", such as the Douglas SBD Dauntless and "scout observation" such as the Curtiss SOC Seagull, and the term lost meaning, becoming a generic term for a US Navy aircraft. This gave rise to the term "scout trainer", including the North American SNJ, Beechcraft SNB, and Vultee SNV series of aircraft which had no offensive or defence fleet roles. Neither the SNB nor the SNJ operated from ships, while only specialized versions of the SNJ did, and mainly on the Great Lakes, for training.

During World War II, observation-scouts were essential for battleships and other surface warships during bombardment of land targets. An observation-scout, such as a Vought OS2U Kingfisher, would spot the fall of ship's shots, and provide corrections, while scout trainers provided flying training.

Due to the improved technology used by today's naval vessels, and the use of ship-launched UAVs for the same sorts of "spotting" missions in the 21st century, scouts are no longer needed for long range exchanges.

== See also ==
- Japanese battleship Yamato
