= Northrop BT =

1935 bomber aircraft family

BT
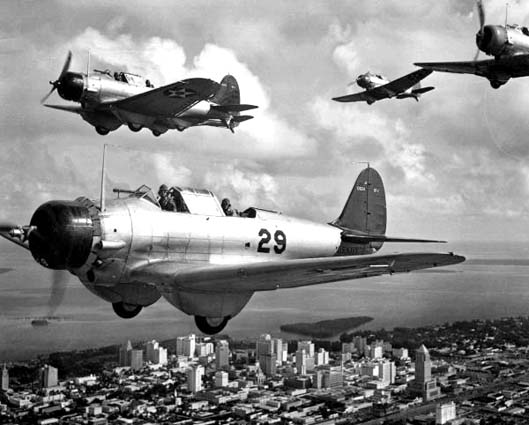
- Northrop BT-1s over Miami in October 1939

General information
- Type: Dive bomber
- National origin: United States
- Manufacturer: Northrop Corporation
- Primary user: United States Navy
- Number built: 55

History
- First flight: 19 August 1935
- Developed into: Douglas SBD Dauntless

The Northrop BT was an American two-seat, single-engine monoplane dive bomber built by the Northrop Corporation for the United States Navy. At the time, Northrop was a subsidiary of the Douglas Aircraft Company. While unsuccessful in its own right, the BT was subsequently redesigned into the Douglas SBD Dauntless, which would form the backbone of the Navy's dive bomber force.

== Design and development ==
The design of the initial version began in 1935. It was powered by a 700 hp (520 kW; 710 PS) Pratt and Whitney XR-1535-66 double row air-cooled radial engine and had hydraulically actuated perforated split flaps (dive brakes), and main landing gear that retracted backwards into fairing "trousers" beneath the wings. The perforated flaps were invented to eliminate tail buffeting during diving maneuvers.

The next iteration of the BT, the XBT-1, was equipped with a 750 hp (560 kW; 760 PS) R-1535. This aircraft was followed in 1936 by the BT-1, powered by an 825 hp (615 kW; 836 PS) R-1535-94 engine. One BT-1 was modified with a fixed tricycle landing gear and was the first such aircraft to land on an aircraft carrier.

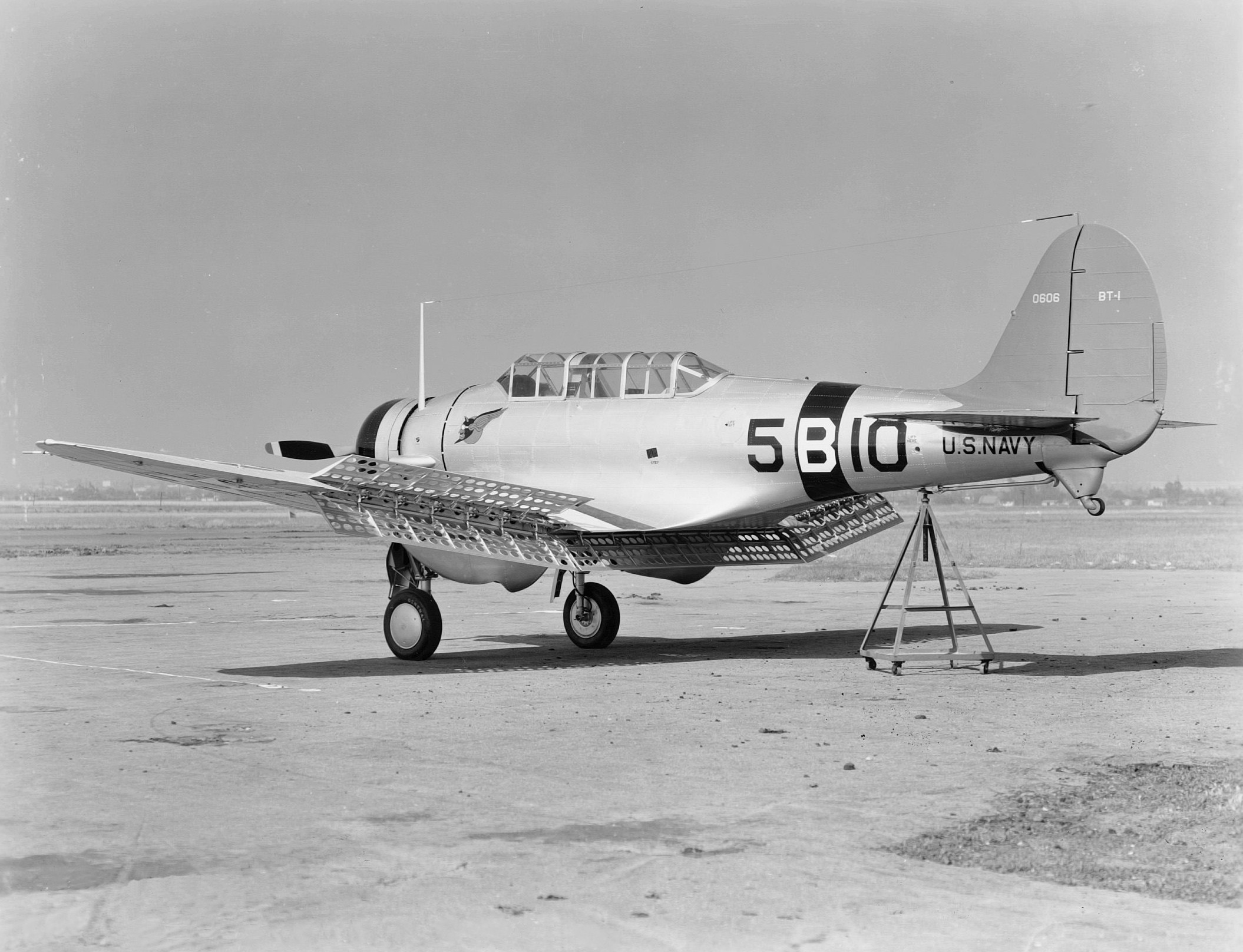
BT-1 of VB-5 in 1938

The final variant, the XBT-2, was a BT-1 modified to incorporate landing gear which folded laterally into recessed wheel wells, leading edge slots, a redesigned canopy, and was powered by an 800 hp (600 kW; 810 PS) Wright XR-1820-32 radial. The XBT-2 first flew on 25 April 1938, and after successful testing the Navy placed an order for 144 aircraft. In 1939 the aircraft designation was changed to the Douglas SBD-1 with the last 87 on order completed as SBD-2s. By this point, Northrop had become the El Segundo division of Douglas aircraft, hence the change.

== Operational history ==
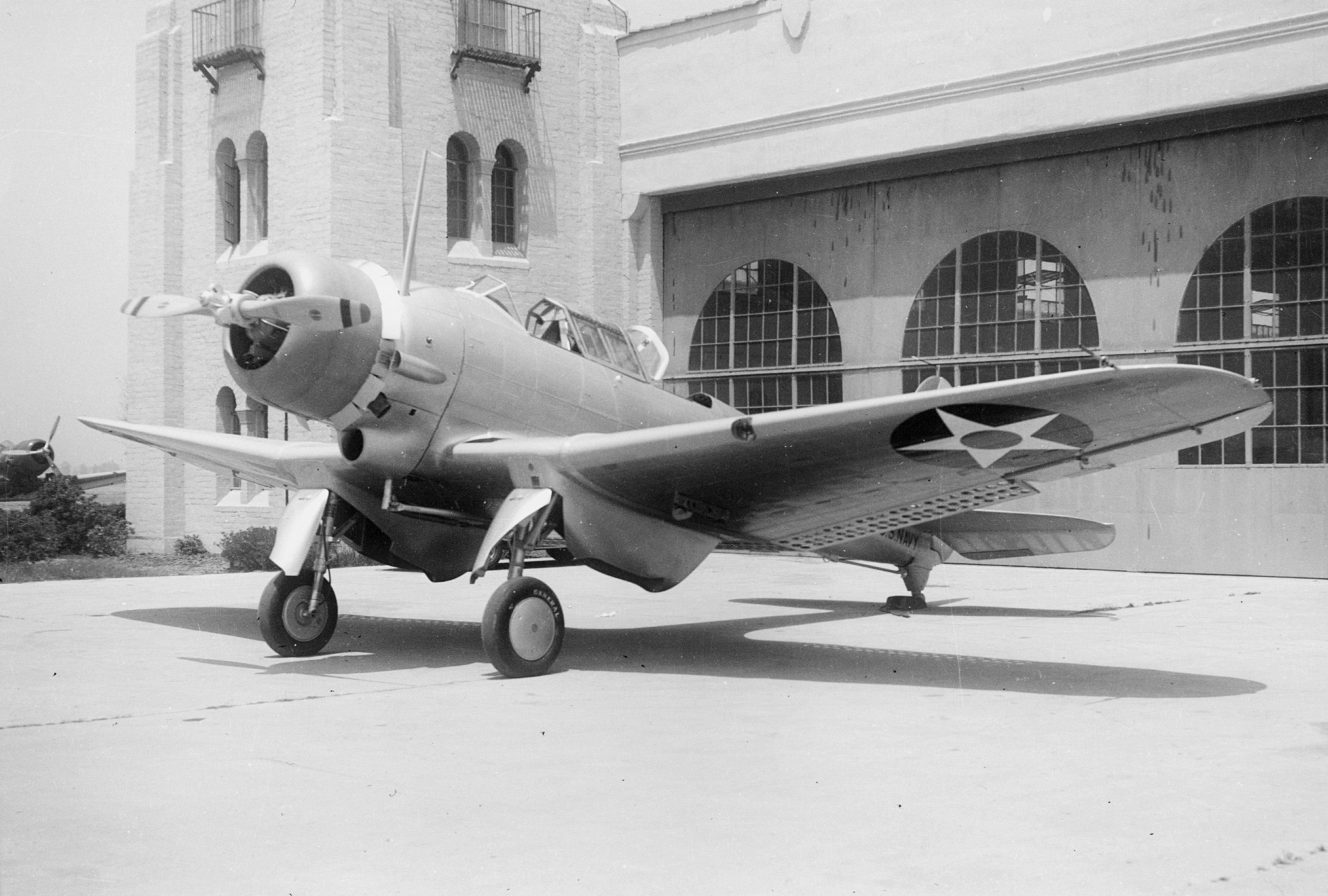
BT-1 at El Segundo

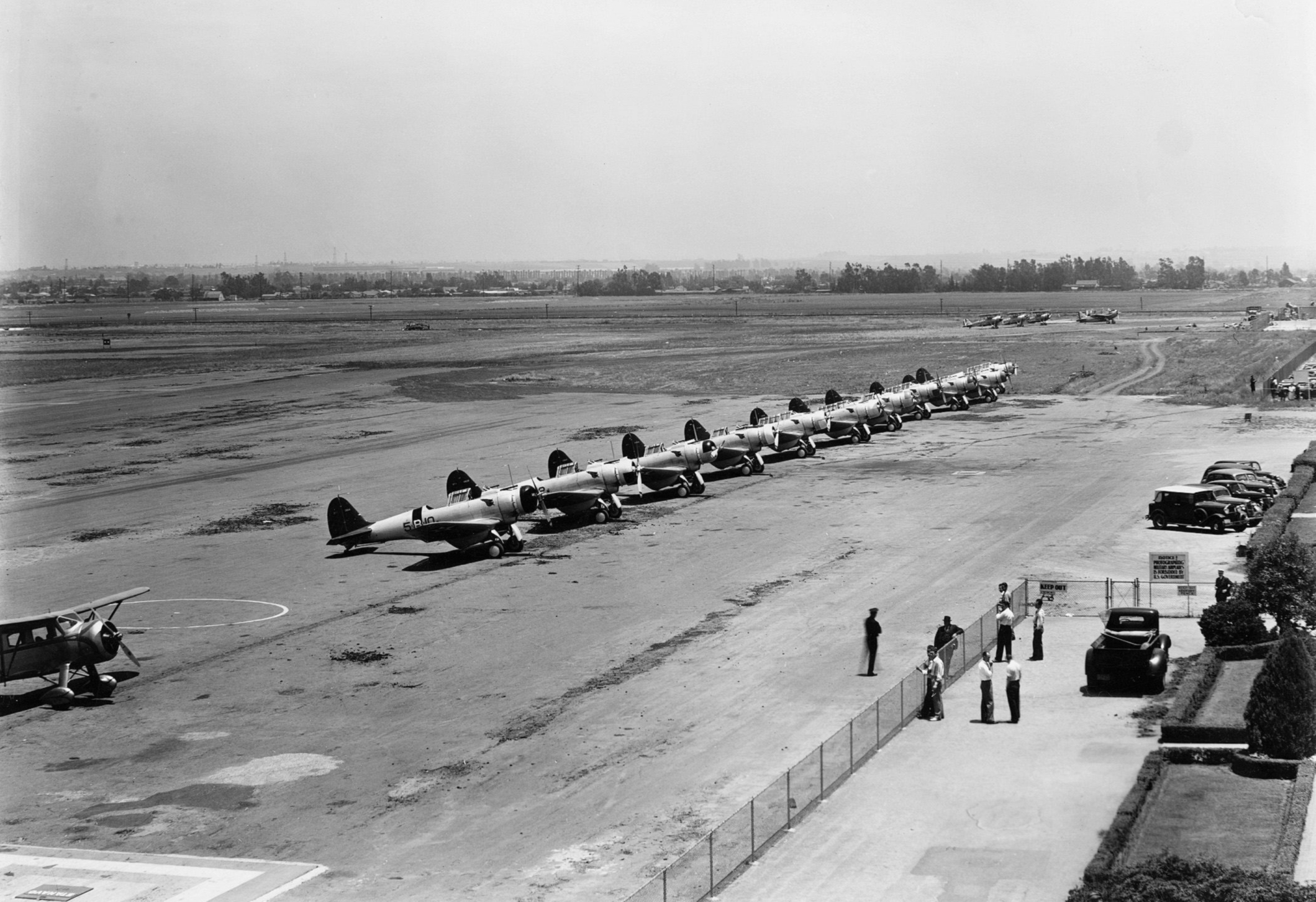
VB-5 lineup of BT-1s

The U.S. Navy placed an order for 54 BT-1s in 1936 with the aircraft entering service during 1938. BT-1s served on USS Yorktown and Enterprise. The type was not a success in service due to poor handling characteristics, especially at low speeds, "a fatal flaw in a carrier based aircraft." It was also prone to unexpected rolls and a number of aircraft were lost in crashes.

== Variants ==
XBT-1
Prototype, one built.
BT-1
Production variant, 54 built.
BT-1S
A BT-1 (c/n346, BuNo 0643) was fitted with a fixed tri-cycle undercarriage. This aircraft was damaged in a crash on 6 February 1939, returned to Douglas and repaired to BT-1 standard.

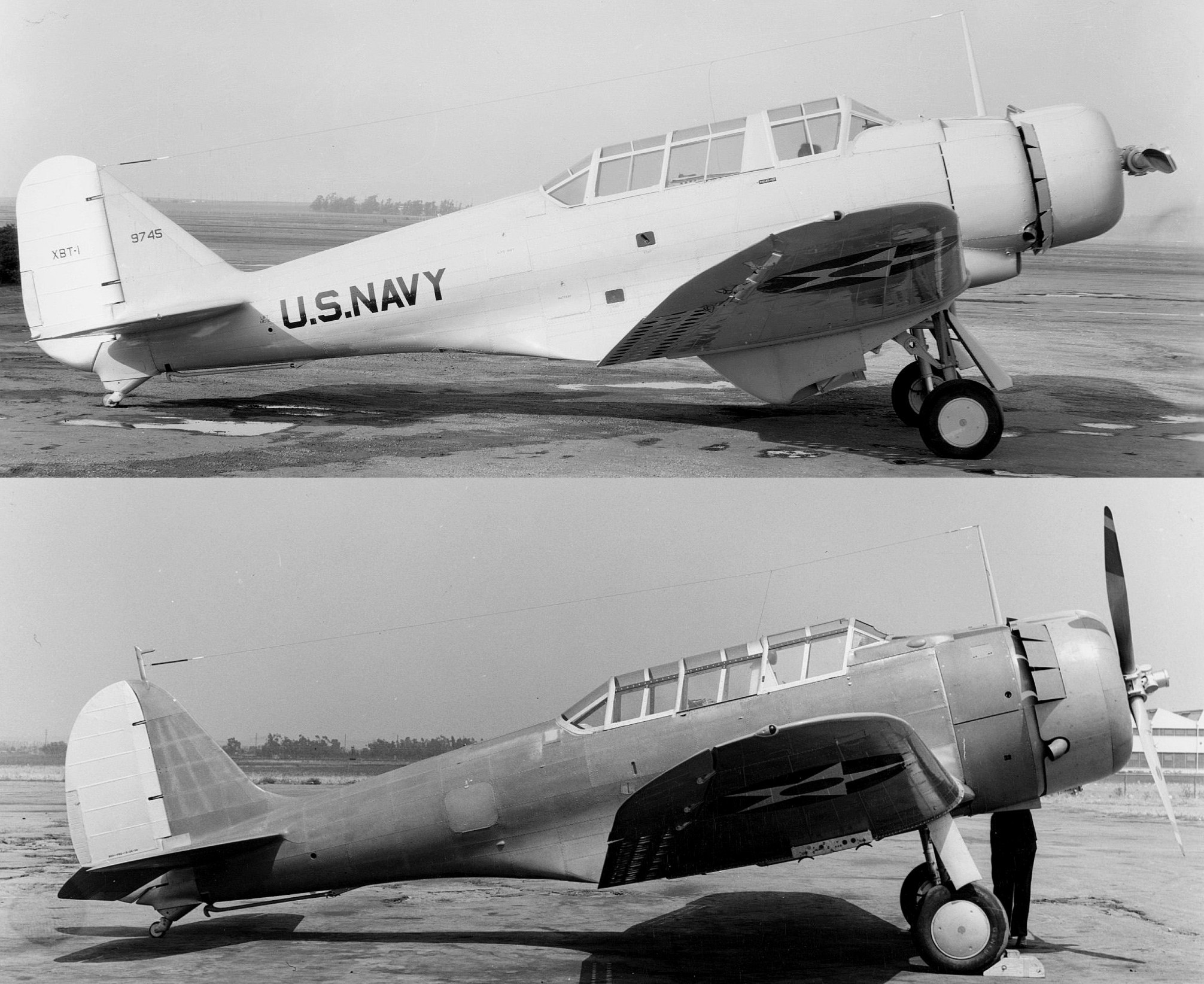
Comparison between the XBT-1 (BuNo 9745) and XBT-2 (BuNo 0627) on 4 December 1936

XBT-2
One BT-1 modified with fully retractable landing gear and other modifications.
BT-2
Production variant of the XBT-2, 144 on order completed as SBD-1 and SBD-2.
Douglas DB-19
One BT-1 (c/n346, BuNo 0643), the former BT-1S, was modified as the DB-19 which was tested by the Imperial Japanese Navy as the Douglas DXD1 (long designation - Douglas Navy Experimental Type D Attack Aircraft)

== Operators ==
United States

- United States Navy

== Specifications (BT-1) ==
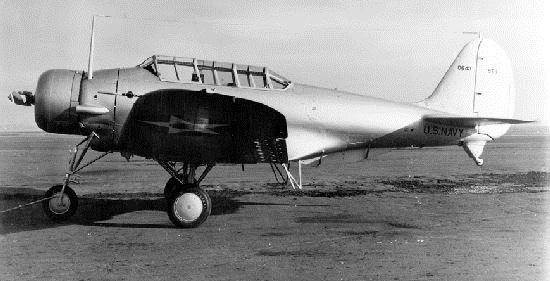
BT-1 modified as a testbed for tricycle landing gear

Data from United States Navy Aircraft since 1911

General characteristics

- Crew: two (pilot and gunner)
- Length: 31 ft 8 in (9.65 m)
- Wingspan: 41 ft 6 in (12.65 m)
- Height: 9 ft 11 in (3.02 m)
- Wing area: 319 sq ft (29.6 m^{2})
- Empty weight: 4,606 lb (2,094 kg)
- Max takeoff weight: 7,197 lb (3,271 kg)
- Powerplant: 1 × Pratt & Whitney R-1535-94 Twin Wasp Jr. double row radial air-cooled engine, 825 hp (615 kW)

Performance

- Maximum speed: 193 kn (222 mph, 357 km/h) at 9,500 ft (2,900 m)
- Cruise speed: 167 kn (192 mph, 309 km/h)
- Range: 1,000 nmi (1,150 mi, 1,852 km)
- Service ceiling: 25,300 ft (7,710 m)
- Rate of climb: 1,270 ft/min (6.5 m/s)

Armament

- Guns:
  - 1 × forward firing 0.50 in (12.7 mm) Browning machine gun
  - 1 × 0.30 in (7.62 mm) machine gun in rear cockpit
- Bombs: 1,000 lb (454 kg) bomb under fuselage

== Notable mentions in media ==
Northrop BT-1s appeared in pre-war yellow wing paint schemes in the Technicolor film Dive Bomber (1941) starring Errol Flynn.

== See also ==
Related development

- Northrop YA-13
- Northrop A-17
- Douglas SBD Dauntless

Aircraft of comparable role, configuration, and era

- Blackburn Skua
- Seversky P-35
- Aichi D3A

Related lists

- List of United States Navy aircraft designations (pre-1962)
