= Naval Aircraft Factory SBN =

1936 scout bomber series

SBN
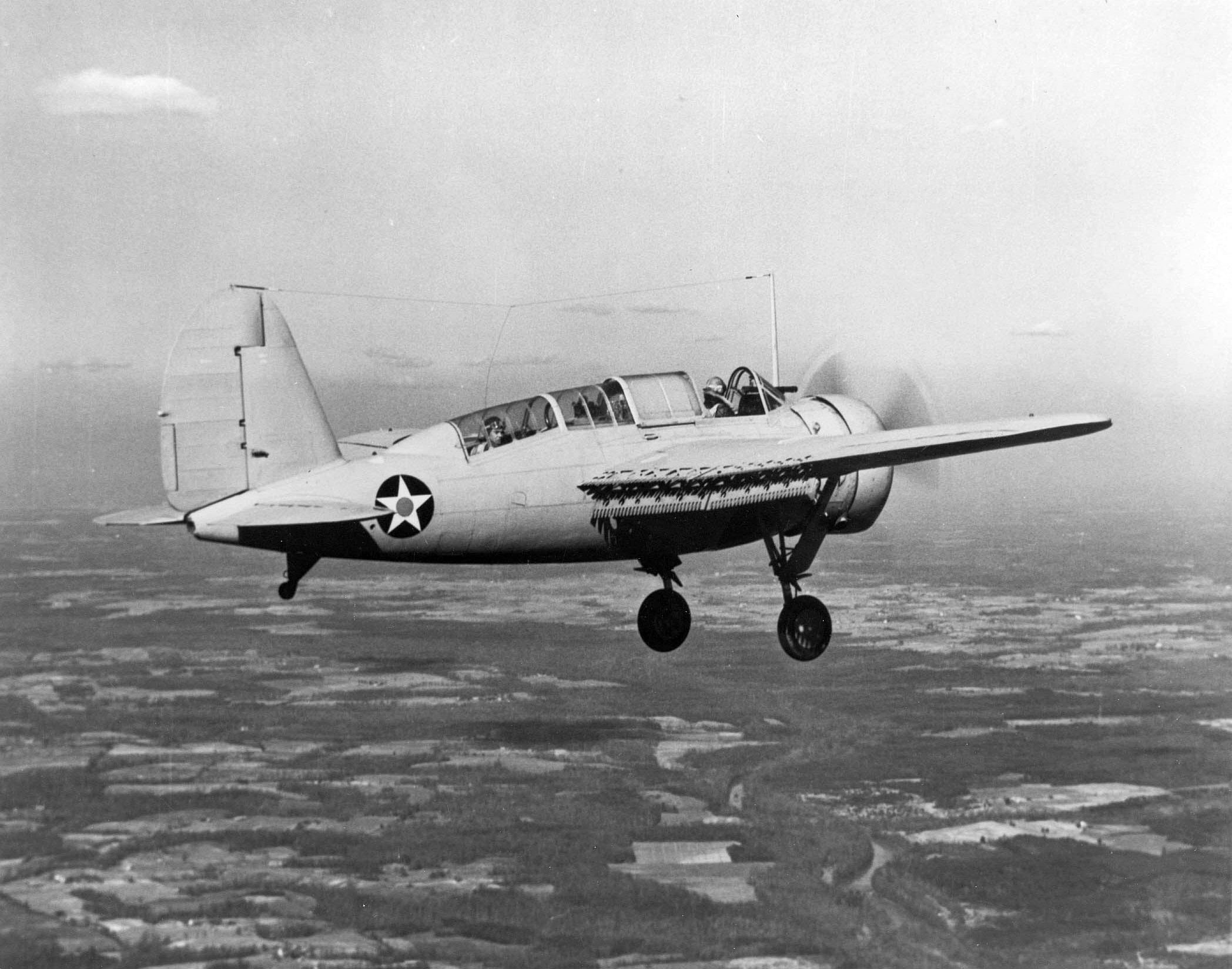
- An SBN-1 of Torpedo Squadron 8 (VT-8) in 1941.

General information
- Type: Scout bomber
- National origin: United States
- Manufacturer: Brewster; Naval Aircraft Factory
- Primary user: United States Navy
- Number built: 1 (XSBA); 30 (SBN)

History
- Introduction date: 1941
- First flight: 15 April 1936

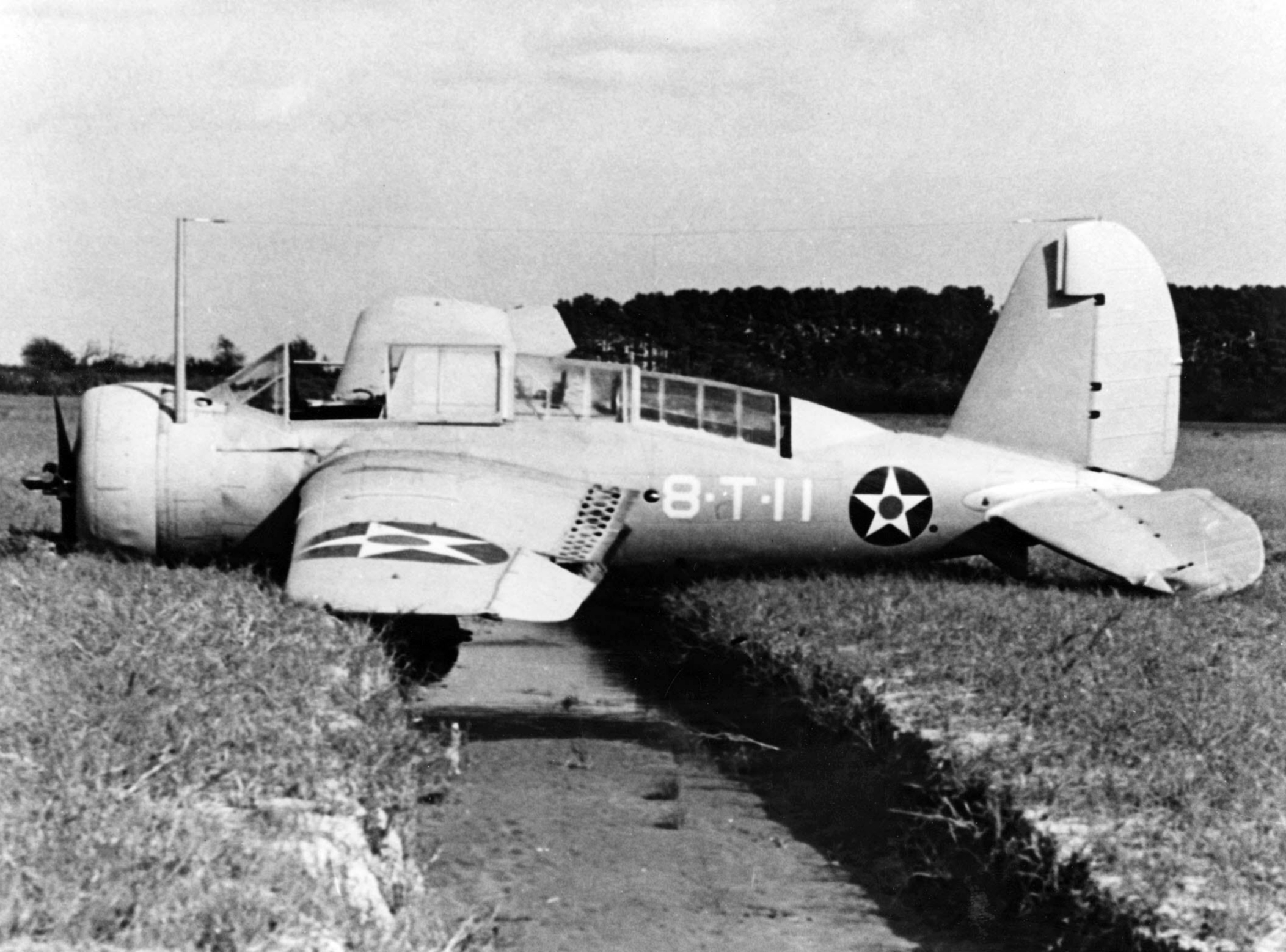
An SBN-1 of Torpedo Squadron 8 (VT-8) at Norfolk, Virginia, in 1941.

The Naval Aircraft Factory SBN was a United States three-seat mid-wing monoplane scout bomber/torpedo aircraft designed by the Brewster Aeronautical Corporation and built under license by the Naval Aircraft Factory in Philadelphia, Pennsylvania. The landing gear was similar to that on the Brewster F2A Buffalo fighter aircraft. The SBN had non-folding wings with perforated flaps.

== Development ==
The United States Navy issued specifications for a scout bomber in 1934 and Brewster won the competition. The Navy ordered one prototype, designated the XSBA-1, on 15 October 1934. It was a two-seat, single-engine monoplane with retractable landing gear and an internal bomb bay that could accommodate a 500-pound (227-kg) bomb. The crewman in the rear seat was armed with a flexible machine gun.

The prototype XSBA-1 first flew on 15 April 1936, and was delivered to the Navy for testing. With a Wright R-1820-4 Cyclone 770-horsepower (570-kilowatt) engine, it achieved a top speed of 254 mph (409 km/h), with an estimated range of 1,000 miles at cruising speed. Some minor problems were found during testing and less than a year after its first flight, the aircraft was given a revised tail and rudder and a more powerful Wright R-1820-22 Cyclone 950-horsepower (710-kilowatt) engine, with which it reached a top speed of 263 mph (424 km/h). At the time, it was believed to be the fastest single-engine bomber in the world.

Because of the pressures of developing and producing the Brewster F2A Buffalo fighter, Brewster was unable to manufacture any production models of the XSBA-1, and the Navy acquired a license to produce the aircraft itself at the Naval Aircraft Factory. In September 1938, the Navy placed an order for 30 production aircraft. Due to pressures of work at the NAF, it did not deliver the first aircraft, now designated the SBN, until November 1940; the remaining aircraft were delivered between June 1941 and March 1942.

== Operational history ==
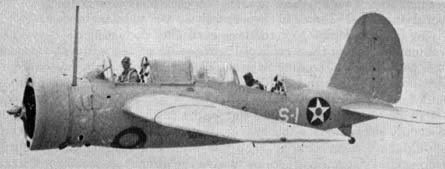
An SBN-1 in 1941.

Most of the SBNs were delivered to Bombing Squadron 3 (VB-3) aboard the aircraft carrier USS Saratoga (CV-3). Obsolete before their delivery in 1941, some of the early production aircraft were used for carrier operations trials with Torpedo Squadron Eight (VT-8) in 1941 and then passed on for use as trainers aboard the aircraft carrier USS Hornet (CV-8). None of the SBNs saw combat. With a lack of spare parts, the aircraft were withdrawn from service in August 1942.

== Variants ==
XSBA-1
Brewster-built prototype, one built (Bu9726).
SBN-1
Naval Aircraft Factory license-built production aircraft, 30 built (Bu1522/1551).

== Operators ==
- United States

United States Navy

== Specifications (SBN-1) ==
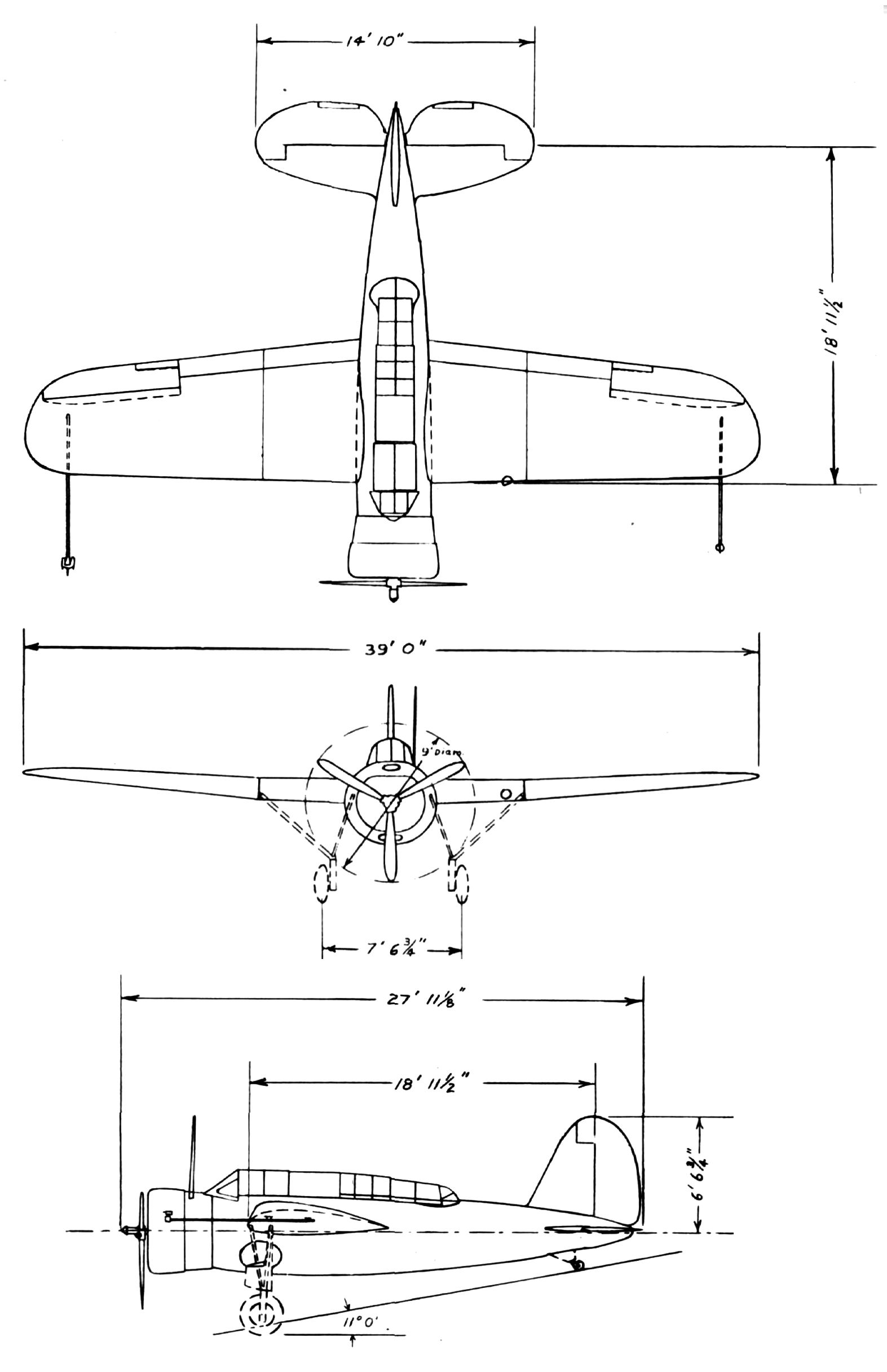
Brewster XF2A-1 3-view drawing from NACA-WR-L-412

General characteristics

- Crew: 3 (pilot, navigator, gunner)
- Length: 27 ft 8 in (8.43 m)
- Wingspan: 39 ft 0 in (11.89 m)
- Height: 8 ft 7 in (2.64 m)
- Wing area: 259 sq ft (24.1 m^{2})
- Gross weight: 3,759 lb (3,066 kg)
- Powerplant: 1 × Wright XR-1820-22 Cyclone radial engine , 950 hp (709 kW)

Performance

- Maximum speed: 254 mph (409 km/h, 221 kn)
- Range: 1,015 mi (1,633 km, 882 nmi)
- Service ceiling: 28,300 ft (8,600 m)

Armament

- 1 × rearward-firing, flexible .30 in (7.62 mm) machine gun
- Up to 500 lbs (227 kg) of bombs

== See also ==
Related development

- Brewster F2A Buffalo

Related lists

- List of aircraft of World War II
- List of military aircraft of the United States
