= VPB-13 =

Patrol Bombing Squadron 13
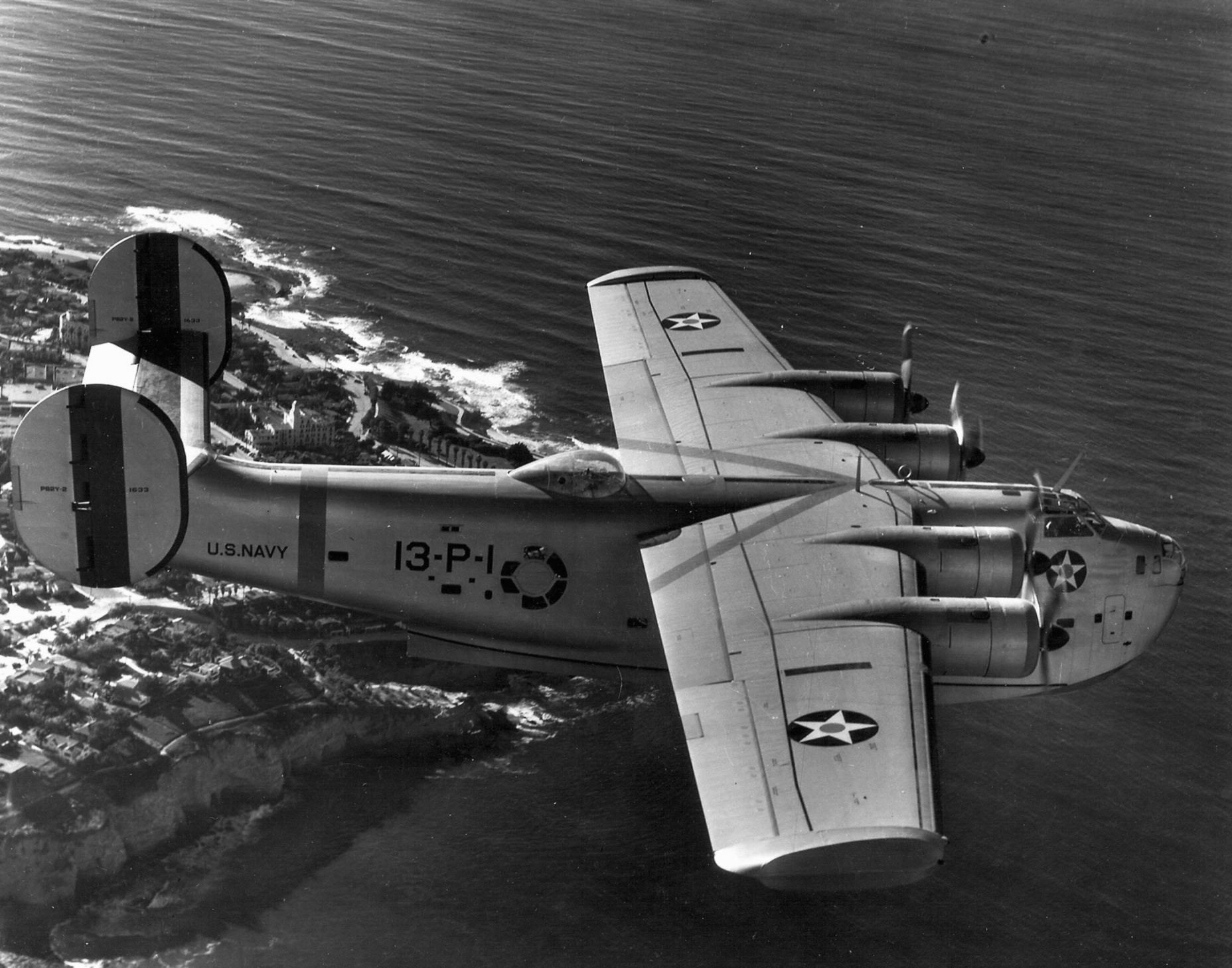
- VP-13 PB2Y-2 in 1941
- Active: 15 September 1941 – 11 January 1950
- Country: United States of America
- Branch: United States Navy
- Type: squadron
- Role: Maritime patrol
- Engagements: World War II

Aircraft flown
- Patrol: XPB2Y-1/PB2Y-1/2/3/3H/5

VPB-13 was a patrol bombing squadron of the U.S. Navy. The squadron was established as Patrol Squadron 13 (VP-13) on 1 July 1940, redesignated Patrol Bombing Squadron 13 (VPB-13) on 1 October 1944 and disestablished on 1 December 1945.

== Operational history ==
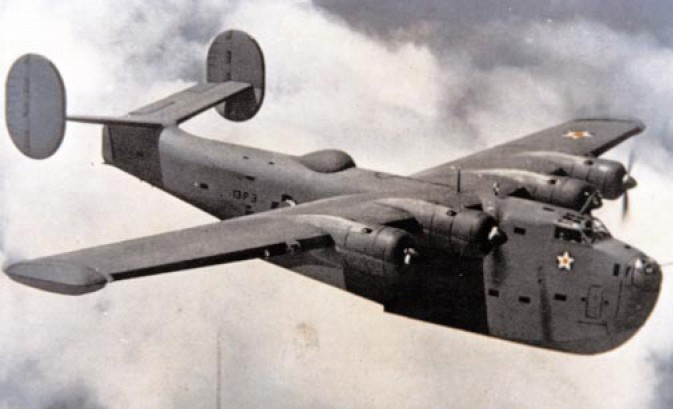
VP-13 PB2Y-2 in 1941

- 1 July 1940: VP-13 was formed from a cadre of personnel and equipment taken from VP-14 at NAS San Diego, California, coming under the operational control of PatWing-1. The squadron had been formed as a detachment of VP-14 in March 1940 when training in the new XPB2Y-1 Coronado was begun at San Diego. The four-engine, heavy seaplane had been designed to bomb, protect itself with its own heavy armament, land on water, rescue downed flyers, conduct long-range patrols, and carry heavy freight and passengers. After its establishment the squadron had a complement of four PB2Y-1 aircraft to train crews and iron out the wrinkles from the factory as the newer PB2Y-2 models were coming off the production lines.
- January 1941: The squadron commanding officer, Lieutenant Commander S. B. Cooke, was killed in an air accident while flying as a passenger in a military transport aircraft.
- August 1941: Tests in aerial refueling were conducted to see if the range of the Coronados could be extended. Although tests were positive, the fuel transfer procedure was judged too complicated and time-consuming to be of operational value.
- 7 December 1941: Following the Attack on Pearl Harbor the squadron went to wartime footing. Over the next few days the three PB2Y-2 aircraft assigned to the squadron were fully equipped with machine guns, ammunition, bomb racks and bombs.
- 10 December 1941: War preparation activities were interrupted when two of the squadron aircraft flew Secretary of the Navy Frank Knox and his party to Hawaii. Unfortunately, at this stage of the war the aircraft were not equipped with self-sealing fuel tanks, and the aircraft Knox boarded developed leaks after its tanks were fully loaded. He was eventually delivered to Naval Base Pearl Harbor, but only after many flight cancellations and delays. That incident gave the PB2Y a bad reputation in Washington that it would never completely overcome.
- 24 December 1941: VP-13 dispatched a Coronado to Pearl Harbor carrying Admiral Ernest King and Admiral Chester W. Nimitz, followed the next day by a Coronado bearing Rear Admiral McCain and Vice Admiral Halsey. Upon arrival, both aircraft were attached to PatWing-2, as the Flag Detachment of VP-13, based at NAS Ford Island, Pearl Harbor. Duties assigned were generally those of long, 14 to 15 hour patrols, broken by occasional trips to Australia and areas of the South Pacific needing quick deliveries of supplies or important personnel. The runs to Sydney became so frequent that a maintenance unit was set up at the Qantas Empire Airways seadrome on Rose Bay. By June 1942, four PB2Ys were in constant service flying 12 round trips a month from NAS Kaneohe Bay to Rose Bay, over 4,000 miles (6,400 km) one-way.
- 1 April 1942: The San Diego–based portion of VP-13 was assigned to transition training for new aircrews destined for other squadrons, using the PB2Y-2, PBY5A and XPBM-1 aircraft. During this period the San Diego detachment continued to provide shuttle service between Pearl Harbor and San Diego for high priority cargo and VIPs.
- June 1942: VP-13 received the first PB2Y-3 for testing and operations. All of the new aircraft were equipped with pilot armor and self-sealing fuel tanks. The earlier PB2Y-2 models had been retrofitted three months earlier.
- 20 September 1942: The San Diego–based detachment sent one PB2Y-3 on a trip to Miami, Florida, returning by way of the Caribbean and several South American countries. It returned to San Diego on 13 October 1942.
- November 1942: The Flag Detachment at NAS Kaneohe Bay returned to NAS San Diego, having been relieved by squadron VR-2 of the Naval Air Transport Service (NATS).
- 27 December 1942: Lieutenant W. O. Carlson and his crew were killed during a practice landing at Salton Sea near San Diego. No cause for the crash was determined.
- 8 January 1943: VP-13 made the trans-Pacific flight from San Diego to NAS Kaneohe with 12 PB2Y-3 aircraft, 36 pilots and 264 enlisted personnel. On 20 January, the squadron became operational at NAS Kaneohe Bay under the operational control of FAW-2. It was assigned the primary duties of anti-task force and Anti-submarine warfare (ASW) patrol. Three daily 700 miles (1,100 km) patrols were flown with an average duration of 12 hours. Numerous special cargo flights were flown to Johnston Atoll, Midway Island, Kanton Island, Palmyra Atoll and American Samoa. Special passenger flights covered the entire South Pacific.
- 1 March 1943: The squadron was split into two detachments, one with six aircraft remaining at NAS Kaneohe Bay, the other with six aircraft at Johnston Atoll along with VP-15 supported by tenders. One third of the squadron personnel were detached to form the cadre for a new squadron, VP-15. This left VP-13 with only six patrol plane commanders, which was further reduced at the end of the month when Lieutenant (jg) O’Donnell and his crew were killed during a Dumbo (air-sea rescue) mission from Johnston Atoll while attempting to locate a missing aircraft.
- 19 November – 6 December 1943: A detachment of four aircraft was sent to Funafuti, Ellice Islands, primarily to serve as evacuation aircraft for the wounded in the forthcoming invasion of the Gilbert Islands. Only one evacuation flight was made, as the aircraft were quickly put into service transporting tactical commanders and vital equipment to Tarawa, Makin Island and Apamama. No advanced base facilities were available at these sites, and the crews serviced their own aircraft.
- 1 December 1943: The few PB2Y-1 and 2 aircraft still operated by the squadron were flown to San Diego and replaced with new PB2Y-3 aircraft fresh from the factory.
- 6 December 1943: Two of the VP-13 aircraft sent to Funafuti returned to NAS Kaneohe Bay. One other returned on 20 December 1943.
- 25 January 1944: A detachment of four of the squadron's PB2Y-3s were converted to transport-ambulance aircraft (PB2Y-3H) and sent to Tarawa. In the following months, the detachment made numerous trips to Majuro, Apamama, Kwajalein and Eniwetok evacuating wounded, carrying mail and transporting passengers.
- 30 January – 9 February 1944: Based at Midway Island, VP-13 carried out four heavy bombing raids on Wake Island, the first ever conducted by a formation of heavy seaplanes over a long distance. The neutralization of the airfields on Wake was considered so important that the commander of FAW-2, Rear Admiral John D. Price, accompanied the bombers on two of the raids. Six crews and aircraft from VP-102 were included in the missions. Previous raids on Wake had resulted in high casualties due to poor navigation and breaking of radio silence which had alerted the Japanese defenders. VPs 13 and 102 made four raids over 2,100 miles (3,400 km) each way, dropping 60 tons of bombs in 50 sorties without a single casualty to personnel or aircraft.
- 26 January – 7 March 1944: A detachment of four aircraft was sent to Tarawa, with tender services provided by USS Curtiss. The mission of the detachment was to evacuate casualties and carry mail, cargo and personnel between the various Gilbert and Marshall Islands. One round-trip flight was made each day, carrying approximately 13,000 pounds. More could have been carried, but rough water and lack of beaching facilities reduced the operational capacity of the Coronados on these trips. By March, the construction of airstrips on land in the occupied areas allowed the NATS R4D aircraft to assume the services provided by VP-13.
- 17–18 April 1944: VP-13 conducted five mine-laying sorties (Mark 10/Mod.6 mines) from Eniwetok in the waters surrounding the island of Truk. It was found that the external wing mounts for the mines so affected the handling and airspeed of the Coronados that they could scarcely attain an air speed of 116 knots.
- 11–22 May 1944: The Ebeye detachment conducted 11 nights of nuisance bombing on Wotje Atoll, 200 miles (320 km) from Ebeye. Three aircraft flew in four-hour relays each night to the island, dropping one 500-pound bomb every half-hour. Poor visibility resulted in 40 percent of the drops being made with radar, and approximately 80 percent of the bombs landed in the general target areas. *26 February – 22 June 1944: VP-13 was ordered to the Marshall Islands to assume antishipping and ASW responsibilities over the fleet. The first stop for the squadron was at Kwajalein, followed by Eniwetok two days later. Here VP-13 began conducting two 600 miles (970 km) to 900 miles (1,400 km) patrols each day, the longest search sectors ever flown by a PB2Y-3 to date. USS Chincoteague provided tender services. No enemy convoys were spotted, but several submarines were seen while on patrol. Since this area was then a sanctuary for friendly submarines, no attacks were delivered, but the position of any contact was reported for investigation by surface units. On 1 April, the squadron was split in half with six aircraft being sent to Ebeye Island, where PATSU 2-6 was located. On 22 June, the squadron was relieved by VP-102 for return to NAS Kaneohe Bay. During this deployment VP-13 shot down five Japanese Mitsubishi G4M Betty bombers
- 14 July 1944: The last VP-13 Coronado touched down in San Diego Bay. All personnel were granted 30 days of home leave, with 60 percent of the squadron receiving orders to report back to VPB-13 for the reforming of the squadron.
- 15 August 1944: VP-13 reformed at NAS San Diego under the operational control of FAW-14. By 16 September, the first of the new Coronados, the PB2Y5, began arriving. The new models sported improved radar (AN-APS-2), total fuel cell protection, reinforced hull surfaces, and improved cockpit instrumentation. In a departure from earlier squadron practice, each crew was assigned its own aircraft and held responsible for its proper shakedown prior to the coming trans-Pacific flight back to the combat zone.
- 17 October 1944: Lieutenant Cullinane and his entire crew perished in a crash on one of the Coronado Islands.
- 19 November 1944: VPB-13 departed San Diego for Tanapag Harbor, Saipan, Marshall Islands, arriving on 20 November. The squadron came under the operational control of FAW-1. Patrols were begun within a few days of arrival, and by 13 December, three daily patrols with 500 miles (800 km) search sectors toward Japan and one nightly patrol were being flown by the squadron guarding convoys and shipping. Although enemy air attacks on Saipan were frequent, most were concentrated on the Army Air Force side where the B-29s were located. Almost all patrols during this period were long, tiresome and fruitless.
- 2 February – 30 March 1945: VPB-13 was ordered to Ulithi Atoll to provide coverage for the invasion of Iwo Jima, and upon arrival began operations based off tenders USS Casco and USS Shelikof. By 5 February, the squadron began flying 800 miles (1,300 km) patrols between Ulithi and the Philippines. On the 24th the entire squadron moved aboard USS Kenneth Whiting. On 30 March, a barge broke loose during a storm and destroyed one of the squadron aircraft; the next day, a second aircraft was lost when it broke in half while attempting a take off in rough seas. There were no casualties in either accident.
- 7 April 1945: The squadron flew all of its aircraft to Saipan for reconditioning. On 26 April, VPB-13 departed Saipan for Kerama Retto, Ryukyu Islands. Upon arrival, tender support was provided by USS Kenneth Whiting. The next day, a Kamikaze attempted to ram Whiting, but missed and hit USS Pinkney moored nearby. On 30 April another Kamikaze struck USS St. George, causing several casualties but only minor damage. All hands spent a considerable amount of time at General Quarters throughout May, manning the turrets of the aircraft in the mooring area. From Kerama Retto, the squadron conducted patrols and strikes along the coast of China to the southeast coasts of the Japanese main islands. Two aircraft were shot down and one ship sunk on these patrols. One PB2Y-5 made a forced landing after suffering damage from anti-aircraft fire during a strafing attack. The entire crew was rescued.
- 9 May 1945: Lieutenant P. R. Harris and his crew were returning from a patrol and arrived in the middle of an air raid. After 14 hours in the air the Coronado's fuel state was critical. Lieutenant Harris attempted an open sea night landing ten miles south of Kerama Retto. At 03:00 the Coronado crashed, killing the pilot and seven other crewmembers. Three crewmen survived with injuries.
- 10 May 1945: Lieutenant William L. Kitchen and Lieutenant (jg) John A. Hoppe and their crews shared a kill when they surprised a Kawanishi H6K Mavis flying-boat
- 24 May 1945: Lieutenant Donald C. Frentz and Lieutenant Herschel M. Cummins Jr. and their crews shared a kill while on patrol, shooting down an Aichi E13A Jake reconnaissance seaplane
- 2 Jun 1945: Lieutenant George Head was returning from patrol when a call for rescue of a downed pilot was received. Lieutenant Head damaged his aircraft on landing and the crew was forced to join the downed fighter pilot in the water. A PBM was able to land and pick up both the fighter pilot and Head's crew, taking off with JATO assistance. The favor was returned the next day when a VPB-13 crew spotted a downed PBM crew and steered a nearby submarine to their rescue.
- 19 July 1945: VPB-13 evacuated the Kerama Retto area in the face of an approaching typhoon, returning to Tanapag Harbor, Saipan. The squadron returned to the Ryukus on the 21st.
- 14 July 1945: VPB-13 relocated from Kerama Retto to Kimmu Bay, Okinawa. Tender support was provided by USS Kenneth Whiting, USS Hamlin, USS Gardiners Bay, USS Mackinac and USS Suisun.
- 1 September 1945: VPB-13 moved to NAB Chimu Wan, Okinawa. It remained there as crews were received and old ones were relieved for return to the States through the 19th, when orders were received for movement to Sasebo, Japan. USS Kenneth Whiting departed for Sasebo, and the aircrews berthed aboard USS Pine Island until their departure for the new base on the 22nd. Upon arrival at Sasebo, the squadron began flying patrols over the Sea of Japan and commenced courier flights between Okinawa and Tokyo.
- 28 September 1945: VPB-13 flew to NS Sangley Point, Philippines. On 15 October, courier flights were begun between the Philippines and Hong Kong.
- 30 November 1945: VPB-13 was relieved at Hong Kong for return to NAS San Diego, where the last aircraft arrived on the 17th. The squadron turned in its aircraft to FAW-14 and was disestablished on 21 December 1945.

== Aircraft assignments ==
The squadron was assigned the following aircraft, effective on the dates shown:

- XPB2Y-1 – March 1940
- PB2Y-1 – July 1940
- PB2Y-2 – April 1942
- PB2Y-3 – June 1942
- PB2Y-3H – January 1944
- PB2Y-5 – September 1944

== Home port assignments ==
The squadron was assigned to these home ports, effective on the dates shown:

- NAS San Diego, California – 1 July 1940
- NAS Kaneohe Bay, Hawaii (Det) – 24 December 1941
- NAS Kaneohe Bay – 8 January 1943
- NAS San Diego – July 1944
- NOB Saipan – 19 November 1944
- NAS San Diego – December 1945

== See also ==
- Maritime patrol aircraft
- List of inactive United States Navy aircraft squadrons
- List of United States Navy aircraft squadrons
- List of squadrons in the Dictionary of American Naval Aviation Squadrons
- History of the United States Navy
