= Consolidated Aircraft =

1923–1943 aircraft manufacturer in the United States

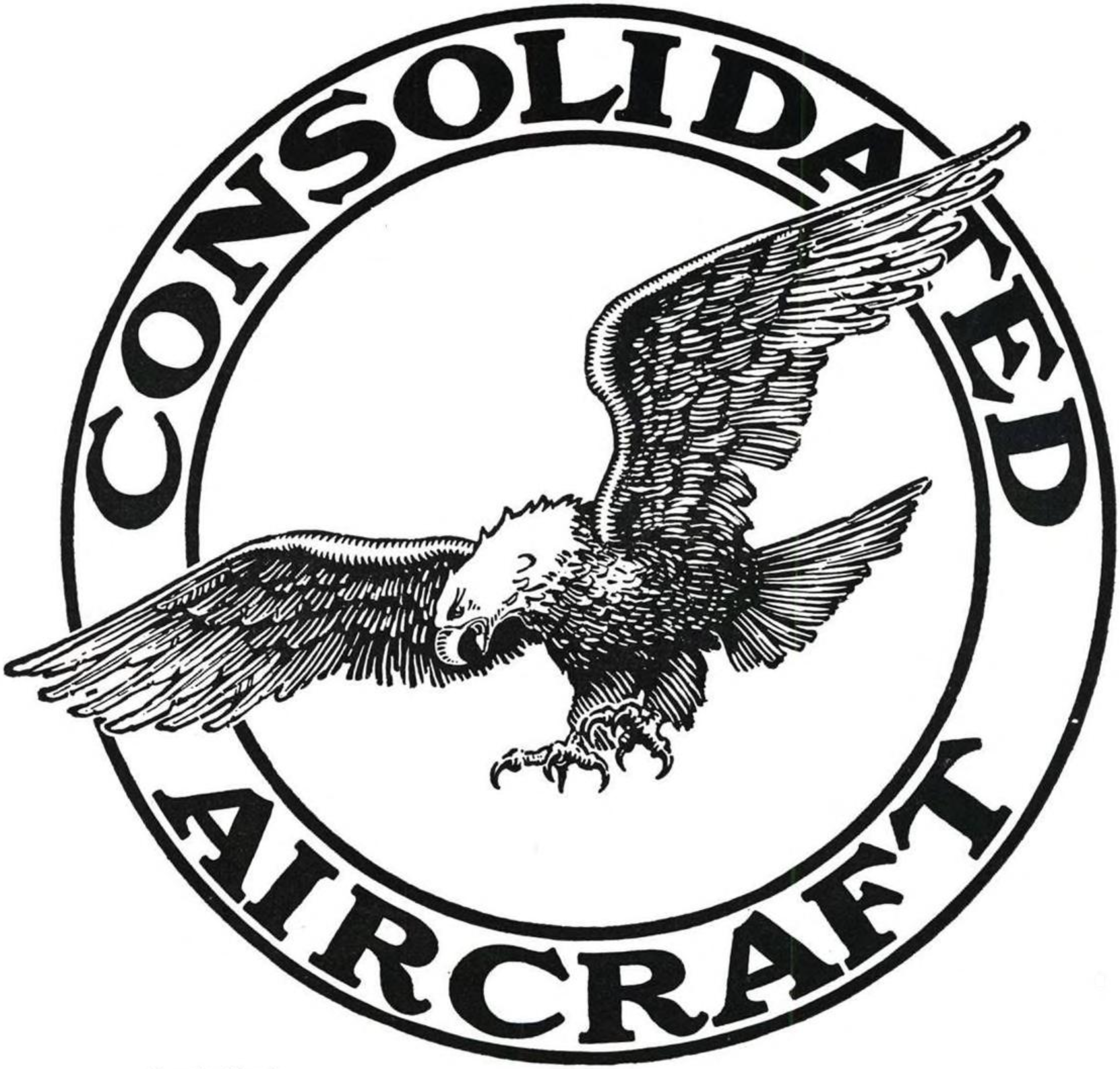
- Type: Public company
- Industry: Aerospace
- Predecessor: Gallaudet Aircraft Company (Note: Only assets purchased, no direct organizational connection); Dayton-Wright Company (Note: Only design rights purchased, not entire company)
- Founded: Buffalo, New York, United States, 1923; 103 years ago
- Founder: Reuben H. Fleet
- Defunct: 1943; 83 years ago
- Fate: Merged with Vultee Aircraft
- Successor: Convair
- Headquarters: San Diego, California, United States of America
- Key people: Isaac M. Laddon
- Parent: Aviation Corporation (1941–1943)

The Consolidated Aircraft Corporation was founded in 1923 by Reuben H. Fleet in Buffalo, New York, the result of the Gallaudet Aircraft Company's liquidation and Fleet's purchase of designs from the Dayton-Wright Company as the subsidiary was being closed by its parent corporation, General Motors. Consolidated became famous during the 1920s and 1930s for its line of flying boats. The most successful of the Consolidated patrol boats was the PBY Catalina, which was produced throughout World War II and used extensively by the Allies. Equally famous was the B-24 Liberator, a heavy bomber which, like the Catalina, saw action in both the Pacific and European theaters.

In 1943, Consolidated merged with Vultee Aircraft to form Consolidated-Vultee Aircraft, later known as Convair. The Los Angeles-based Consolidated Steel Corporation is not related.

The name was often abbreviated to Consair, including within the company. For example, the March 1942 issue of the employee publication, The Consolidator, used "Consair" nine times, compared to 46 times for "Consolidated."

== History ==
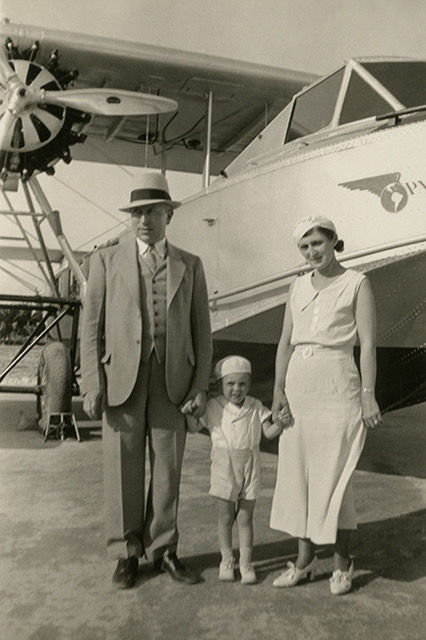
Tourists with a Consolidated Commodore flying boat used by Pan Am to fly routes in the Caribbean in the 1930s.

Consolidated Aircraft (and later Convair) had their headquarters in San Diego, California, on the border of Lindbergh Field (KSAN).

Consolidated's first design was one of those purchased by Fleet from Dayton-Wright, the TW-3 primary trainer, sold to the U.S. Army as the PT-1 Trusty. In September 1924 the company moved from the Gallaudet plant in Rhode Island to new facilities in Buffalo, New York, and in the same year won a U.S. Navy contract for a naval version of the PT-1 designated the NY-1.

Lawrence D. Bell served as the Operating Head at Consolidated from 1929 to 1934. When the company made plans to relocate to San Diego, Bell decided to stay behind to start up his own company, the Bell Aircraft Corporation, in the former Consolidated plant.

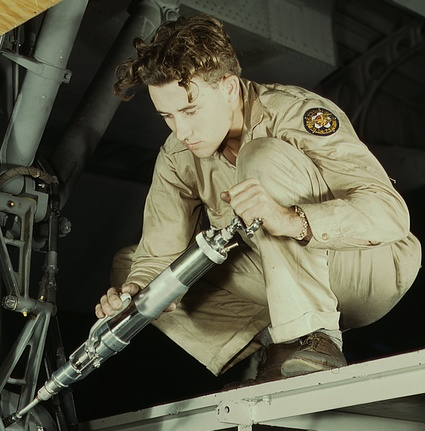
A Consolidated Aircraft hydraulic mechanic greasing the landing gear of a transport

In September 1935 Consolidated moved across the country to its new "Building 1", a 247,000-square-foot (22,900 m^{2}) continuous flow factory in San Diego, California. The first production PBY Catalina was launched in San Diego Bay in 1936, and the first XPB2Y-1 Coronado test aircraft made its first flight in 1937. Consolidated vice president Edgar Gott was responsible for securing the company's contract to design and build the B-24 Liberator bomber. The XB-24 Liberator prototype made its first flight in December 1939, and the first production order was from the French in 1940, just days before their surrender to Germany; six of these YB-24 Liberators were designated LB-30A and ferried to Britain.

In 1940, Consolidated bought Hall-Aluminum Aircraft Corporation and dissolved the company. Archibald M. Hall was President of the company at the time and later became an executive of Consolidated. Several other Hall-Aluminum engineers and technical people were added to the Consolidated staff to meet defense production needs. By the fall of 1941, Consolidated was San Diego's largest employer with 25,000 employees, which eventually expanded to 45,000 by the following year.

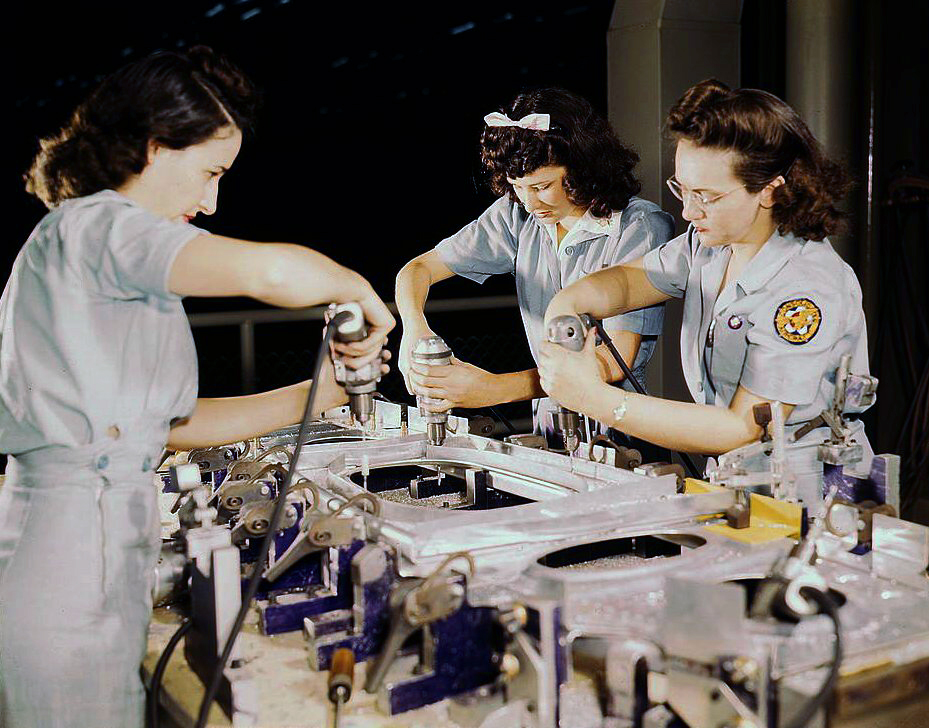
Assembling a wing section, Fort Worth, Texas, October 1942

In November 1941, Fleet sold his 34.26% interest in Consolidated for $10.9 million to Victor Emanuel, the president of the Aviation Corporation (the future AVCO), with the idea that Consolidated would be merged with Aviation’s Vultee subsidiary.

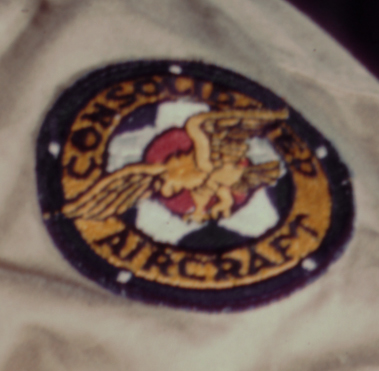
Consolidated Aircraft patch during WWII

During World War II, Consolidated found itself unable to return its delivery pilots to San Diego fast enough due to lack of transport, the flying boat services of Pan American Airways being overwhelmed. In response, in 1942 Army Air Corps chief General Henry H. "Hap" Arnold ordered creation of a dedicated service to return pilots to the US, initially with two LB-30s, a version of the B-24 that was built for the UK. This became a new Consolidated (and then Convair) division, the military contract airline Consairway, which pioneered the use of land-based aircraft across the Pacific, dramatically reducing prior travel times. By war's end, Consairway was flying from California to Manila up to four times a day before being shuttered at the end of 1945, having carried 100,000,000 ton-miles and 300,000,000 passenger miles. Consolidated was the only manufacturer to sponsor such an operation.

In 1943, Consolidated merged with Vultee Aircraft to form Consolidated-Vultee Aircraft or Convair.

In March 1953, General Dynamics purchased a majority interest in Convair, where it continued to produce aircraft or aircraft components until being sold to McDonnell Douglas in 1994. McDonnell Douglas shut down the division after just two years of operations in 1996.

== Aircraft ==
Model name	First flight	Number built	Type
Consolidated PT-1 Trusty	1923	221	Single engine biplane trainer
Consolidated NY	1925	302	Single engine biplane trainer
Consolidated PT-3	1927	250	Single engine biplane trainer
Consolidated O-17 Courier	1927	35	Single engine biplane observation airplane
Consolidated Commodore	1928	14	Twin engine monoplane flying boat airliner
Consolidated P2Y	1929	78	Twin engine monoplane flying boat patrol airplane
Consolidated Fleetster	1929	26	Single engine monoplane transport
Consolidated PT-11	1931	41	Single engine biplane trainer
Consolidated XB2Y	1933	1	Single engine biplane dive bomber
Consolidated P-30	1934	60	Single engine monoplane fighter
Consolidated PBY Catalina	1936	1,871	Twin engine monoplane flying boat patrol bomber
Consolidated PB2Y Coronado	1937	217	Four engine monoplane flying boat patrol bomber
Consolidated XP4Y Corregidor	1939	1	Prototype twin engine monoplane flying boat patrol airplane
Consolidated B-24 Liberator	1939	~9,251	Four engine monoplane heavy bomber
Consolidated TBY Sea Wolf	1941	180	Single engine monoplane torpedo bomber
Consolidated B-32 Dominator	1942	118	Four engine monoplane heavy bomber
Consolidated XB-41 Liberator		1	Prototype four engine monoplane bomber escort
Consolidated PB4Y-1 Liberator		977	Four engine monoplane patrol bomber
Consolidated C-87 Liberator Express		287	Four engine monoplane cargo airplane
Consolidated C-109		218	Four engine monoplane cargo airplane
Consolidated Liberator I		20	Four engine monoplane heavy bomber
Consolidated PB4Y-2 Privateer	1944	739	Four engine monoplane patrol bomber
Consolidated R2Y	1944	1	Prototype four engine monoplane cargo airplane
Consolidated XPB3Y	N/A	0	Unbuilt four engine monoplane flying boat patrol bomber
