= VPB-1 =

Patrol Bombing Squadron 1
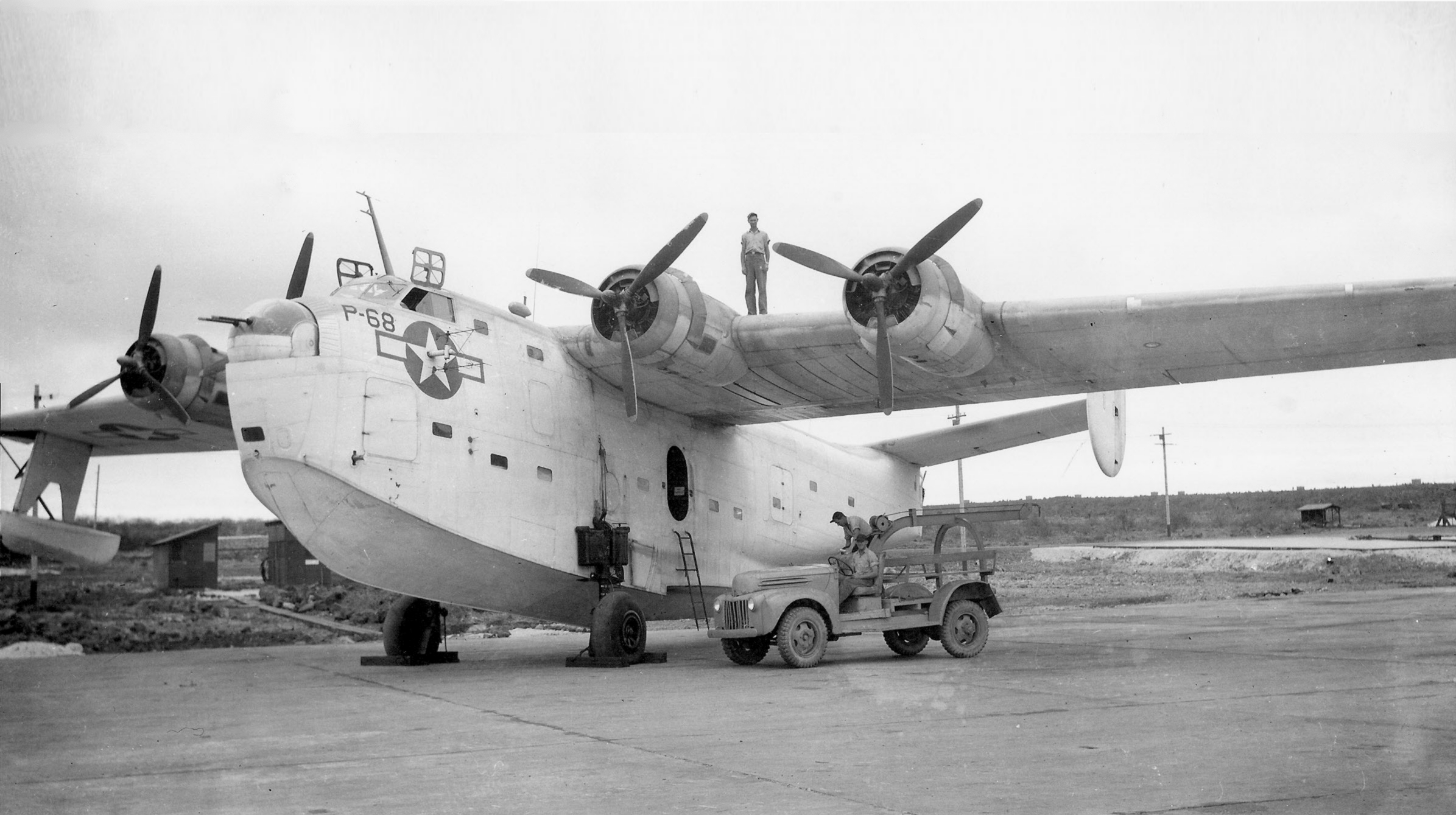
- VPB-1 PB2Y-3 at NAAF Galapagos c.1945
- Active: 15 April 1943 – 6 March 1945
- Country: United States of America
- Branch: United States Navy
- Type: squadron
- Role: Maritime patrol
- Engagements: World War II

Aircraft flown
- Patrol: PB2Y-3

VPB-1 was a Patrol Bombing Squadron of the U.S. Navy. The squadron was established as Patrol Squadron 1 (VP-1) on 15 April 1943, redesignated as Patrol Bombing Squadron 1 (VPB-1) on 1 October 1944 and disestablished 6 March 1945.

== Operational history ==
- 15 April 1943: VP-1 was established at NAS San Diego, California, under the operational control of FAW-14, as a large seaplane squadron flying the PB2Y-3 Coronado. Air crews and ground support staff were assembled and familiarization training in the PB2Y-3 commenced. Twelve aircraft were assigned to the squadron out of a contract in which 254 were built for the Navy. The squadron was formed to be an anti-submarine warfare (ASW) patrol squadron, providing convoy coverage in the southwestern Caribbean, and utility assignments by FAW-3.
- 10 October 1943: VP-1 was transferred to NAS Coco Solo, Panama Canal Zone, under the operational control of FAW-3. Convoy coverage and ASW patrols commenced immediately. The area patrolled out of Coco Solo extended roughly north as far as Jamaica, and from the east coast of Nicaragua to 77 degrees west longitude. Many utility flights were scheduled from Miami to Coco Solo, carrying up to 50 passengers each way. Early ASA radar equipment proved unsatisfactory for night patrols and was soon replaced by improved ASC radar. The electric propeller controls caused many problems during the early days of the deployment, resulting in the loss of one aircraft. Modifications to the controls eliminated the defect. Tropical modifications to the aircraft while at Coco Solo included removal of all interior heating units, de-icing equipment, armor plating and engine superchargers.
- 17 October 1943: A PB2Y flown by Lieutenant A. G. Overton, two other officers and an enlisted crew of eight—was making a ferry flight from San Diego to Coco Solo, when high winds and rough seas forced it to land at Puerto Castilla, Honduras. The storm, reaching hurricane proportions, tore the aircraft loose from its moorings. The crew struggled to taxi into the wind until rescued, but on the night of the 18th the starboard float was carried away and the aircraft capsized. Only two enlisted crewmen managed to exit the aircraft and inflate a life raft before the plane went down with the rest of the crew. AMM2c Bockus and ARM2c Smith drifted with the storm for four days. Nine days after the aircraft sank the survivors washed ashore at Buffalo Point, Great Swan Island, near a naval radio beacon station. They were rescued and given medical attention by the station personnel.
- 6 January 1944: Three PB2Ys and one PBY Catalina were formed into a detachment and flown to NAAF Salinas, Ecuador. The detachment flew east–west patrols for the interception and identification of merchant shipping. On the 14th, a single PBY-5 was sent to NAAF Corinto, Nicaragua, to fly the north–south patrol to the Galapagos with VP-206. These detachments were relieved on 14 February for return to NAS Coco Solo.
- March 1944: One by one, the four PBY-5 Catalinas were turned over to the HEDRON as replacement PB2Y-3 aircraft arrived from San Diego.
- 1 June 1944: A three-aircraft detachment was sent to the Galapagos Islands, working in conjunction with VP-15. Sections of squadron aircraft began flying the north–south track to the Galapagos, then the east–west track to Corinto, returning to Coco Solo the next day.
- 17 July 1944: Lieutenant W. D. Cauthan crashed on landing after patrol at Galapagos. Two pilots and three crew members were killed in the accident.
- 15 October 1944: Three PB2Y-3 aircraft were turned over to VPB-1 by VPB-15, which was to be disestablished.
- 20 October 1944: VPB-1 was relocated from NAS Coco Solo to NAAF Galapagos, Ecuador. The squadron flew six patrol tracks daily.
- 19 February 1945: The squadron returned to NAS Coco Solo in early February and was relieved by VPB-209. Officers and enlisted personnel of the VPB-1 were detached and returned to NAS San Diego, ferrying their aircraft from Coco Solo to San Diego via NAS Key West, Florida, and NAS Corpus Christi, Texas. Two aircraft were lost out of 11 in the flight at NAS Corpus Christi, due to high winds and rough water while moored after landing. There were no injuries in the accidents.
- 6 March 1945: VPB-1 disestablished at NAS San Diego.

== Aircraft assignments ==
The squadron was assigned the following aircraft, effective on the dates shown:

- PB2Y-3 - April 1943

== Home port assignments ==
The squadron was assigned to these home ports, effective on the dates shown:

- NAS San Diego, California - 15 April 1943
- NAS Coco Solo, Panama Canal Zone - 10 October 1943
- NAAF Galapagos, Ecuador - 20 October 1944
- NAS Coco Solo - 3 February 1945
- NAS San Diego - 19 February 1945

== See also ==
- Maritime patrol aircraft
- List of inactive United States Navy aircraft squadrons
- List of United States Navy aircraft squadrons
- List of squadrons in the Dictionary of American Naval Aviation Squadrons
- History of the United States Navy
