= VPB-4 =

Patrol Bombing Squadron 4
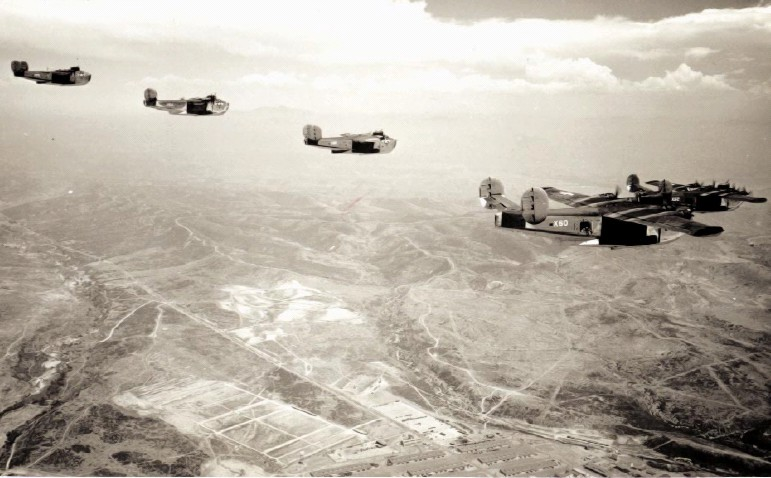
- VPB-4 PB2Y-5s in July 1945
- Active: 1 March 1943 – 1 November 1945
- Country: United States of America
- Branch: United States Navy
- Type: squadron
- Role: Maritime patrol
- Engagements: World War II

Aircraft flown
- Patrol: PB2Y-3/5/5H/3R

VPB-4 was a Patrol Bombing Squadron of the U.S. Navy. The squadron was established as Patrol Squadron 102 (VP-102) on 1 March 1943, redesignated Patrol Bombing Squadron 4 (VPB-4) on 1 October 1944 and disestablished on 1 November 1945.

== Operational history ==
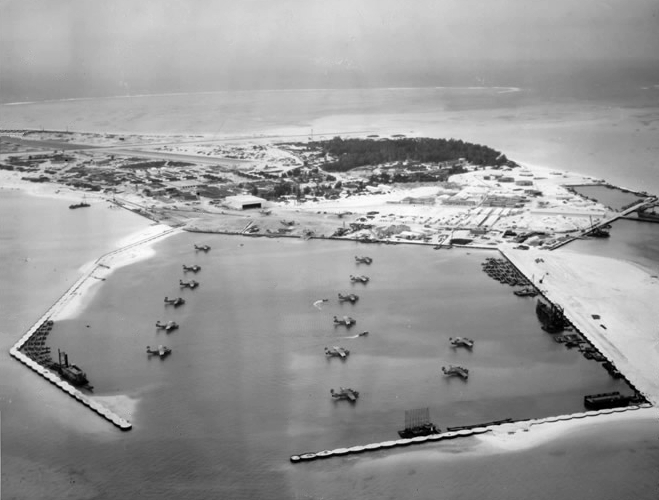
PB2Ys of VP-102 and VP-13 in the submarine basin at Midway Island in January 1944

- 1 March 1943: VP-102 was established at NAS San Diego, California, as a patrol squadron flying the PB2Y-3 Coronado seaplane. Squadron training was continued at San Diego through October 1943, when preparations were begun for the trans-Pacific flight to NAS Kaneohe Bay, Hawaii.
- 8 November 1943: The squadron officially came under the operational control of FAW-2, NAS Kaneohe Bay, and the combat training syllabus was begun for all hands in preparation for the squadron's first combat tour.
- 27 January 1944: A detachment of six aircraft was sent to Midway Island to augment VP-13. On 30 January 1944, the detachment participated in its first combat mission against Japanese positions at Wake Island. The purpose of the long range bombing attacks was to neutralize the threat it posed to forces then engaged in the Gilbert and Marshall Islands campaign. Five of these 2,400 miles (3,900 km) round trip missions were completed between 30 January and 9 February.
- 3 February 1944: A second detachment of six aircraft was formed and deployed from NAS Kaneohe Bay to the Marshall Islands ferrying freight, mail, passengers, and running patrols from NAB Ebeye and NAB Eniwetok, Marshall Islands. On 14 February, an aircraft piloted by Lieutenant Cannon hit a submerged coral head at Ebeye and quickly sank in shallow water. No casualties were incurred in this accident. The detachment completed this assignment in approximately six weeks.
- 14 April 1944: With the increase in squadron missions and dispersed nature of assignments, the need for additional crews soon became apparent. In April six more crews were assigned to VP-102, bringing the total up to 24.
- 21 June 1944: A detachment was deployed to NAB Kwajalein Atoll. The NAB Ebeye detachment continued, and the six new crews remained at NAS Kaneohe Bay for additional combat training.
- 4 July 1944: The NAB Kwajalein detachment was redeployed to Eniwetok, and was joined by the NAB Ebeye detachment, bringing the squadron together again. On 21 August 1944, the crews took turns conducting nuisance bombing attacks on Japanese positions on the island of Ponape. The squadron conducted 21 of these missions by the end of August.
- 30 August 1944: The entire squadron was transferred to Saipan in the Marianas Islands chain, with tender support provided by USS Kenneth Whiting, under the operational control of FAW-1. The squadron remained on the tender until 16 November, when all personnel were moved ashore. Duties during this period consisted of routine patrols, test flights and special flights conveying passengers, mail and equipment between forward areas and the rear echelon. After approximately four months at this location the squadron was given orders for its return to NAS San Diego, departing on the first homeward leg of the journey on 1 December 1944.
- 9 December 1944 – November 1945: The last VPB-4 aircraft arrived at NAS San Diego, coming under the operational control of FAW-14. Post-deployment leave was given to all hands through the end of the month. In January 1945, the squadron began to reform with new personnel and equipment, the PB2Y-5/5H. During this period a new mission was assigned, that of training replacement crews in the operation of the PB2Y-5/5H and 3R aircraft. Trans-Pacific flights were conducted in May to July 1945 to bring replacement crews and aircraft to NAS Kaneohe Bay for deployment in WestPac. With the Surrender of Japan in September 1945, the wholesale disestablishment of squadrons began. VPB-4 was disestablished at NAS San Diego on 1 November 1945.

== Aircraft assignments ==
The squadron was assigned the following aircraft, effective on the dates shown:

- PB2Y-3 - March 1943
- PB2Y-5/5H - January 1945
- PB2Y-3R - June 1945

== Home port assignments ==
The squadron was assigned to these home ports, effective on the dates shown:

- NAS San Diego, California - 1 March 1943
- NAS Kaneohe Bay, Hawaii - 8 November 1943
- NAS San Diego - 9 December 1944

== See also ==
- Maritime patrol aircraft
- List of inactive United States Navy aircraft squadrons
- List of United States Navy aircraft squadrons
- List of squadrons in the Dictionary of American Naval Aviation Squadrons
- History of the United States Navy
