= Edgar Gott =

American aviation industry executive (1887–1947)

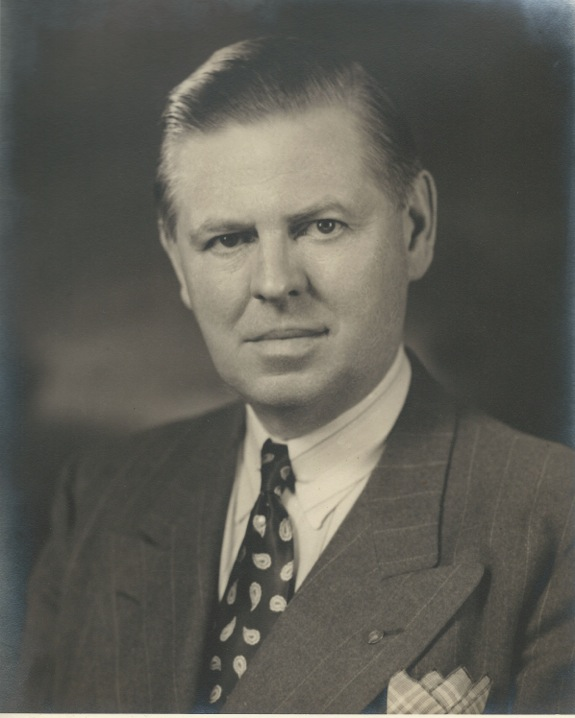
- Gott, c. 1930
- Born: Edgar Nathaniel Gott; May 2, 1887; Detroit, Michigan, U.S.
- Died: July 17, 1947 (aged 60); San Diego, California, U.S.
- Education: University of Michigan
- Occupation: Industrialist
- Known for: Aircraft industry
- Title: Co-founder, first president of Boeing Company; President, Consolidated Aircraft

Edgar Nathaniel Gott (May 2, 1887 – July 17, 1947) was an early American aviation industry executive. A co-founder and first president of The Boeing Company, Gott was a senior executive of several aircraft companies, including Fokker and Consolidated Aircraft.

== Early life ==
Gott was born in Detroit, Michigan in 1887 to Edward Alonzo Gott and Stephanie Ortman. He attended Detroit University School, a predecessor of University Liggett School in Grosse Pointe Woods, Michigan. He graduated with a Bachelor of Science in chemical engineering from the University of Michigan in 1909. At the University of Michigan, Gott conducted research into rapid-cooling electrically heated combustion tubes. After graduation, Gott worked for the Griffin Wheel Company at its Pullman and Tacoma plants, before becoming the agent of his cousin William Boeing's lumber business in 1915.

== Aviation industry career ==
In 1917 he was named vice president of Pacific Aero Products Company of Seattle, which became the Boeing Airplane Company a year later. While a manager at Boeing, Gott used his stature to argue against delivering money or other aid to Germans and Austrians after the end of World War I. In correspondence with a fellow Seattleite, Charles Osner, who was chairman of the Committee for the Relief of Destitute Women and Children in Germany and Austria, Gott argued that relief should first go to citizens of countries that had suffered at the hands of the Central Powers.

Gott was president of Boeing between 1922 and 1925 at a critical juncture in the company's history, leading it out of difficult circumstances in the wake of World War I. Under Gott's leadership, the company obtained several business contracts with the military. Boeing soon became a major producer of military biplanes, including the Boeing NB training aircraft and the PW-9 fighter, and established itself as an important designer and manufacturer of a broad range of military aircraft.

Gott left Boeing in 1925 to become vice president of Fokker Aircraft Corporation of America. The following year he became president of Keystone Aircraft, based in Bristol, Pennsylvania. At Keystone, Gott oversaw the merger of Keystone with Loening Aeronautical Engineering. Keystone under Gott introduced several aircraft for civilian use, including the Petrel and the Puffer, used as a cropduster. At this time, Gott was a member of the Aeronautics Commission of the Bureau of Aeronautics, charged with developing regulations pertaining to safety and licensing of planes and airports.

Gott later served as president of Consolidated Aircraft Corporation in San Diego, California, continuing his lengthy professional relationship with the military aviation industry. At Consolidated, Gott was responsible for the company's contract to design and build the B-24 Liberator bomber. During World War II, Gott was chairman of the war transportation and war housing commissions in San Diego. He also testified before Congress on several issues relating to the war effort. He died in San Diego in 1947.
