= USS Kenneth Whiting =

Tender of the United States Navy

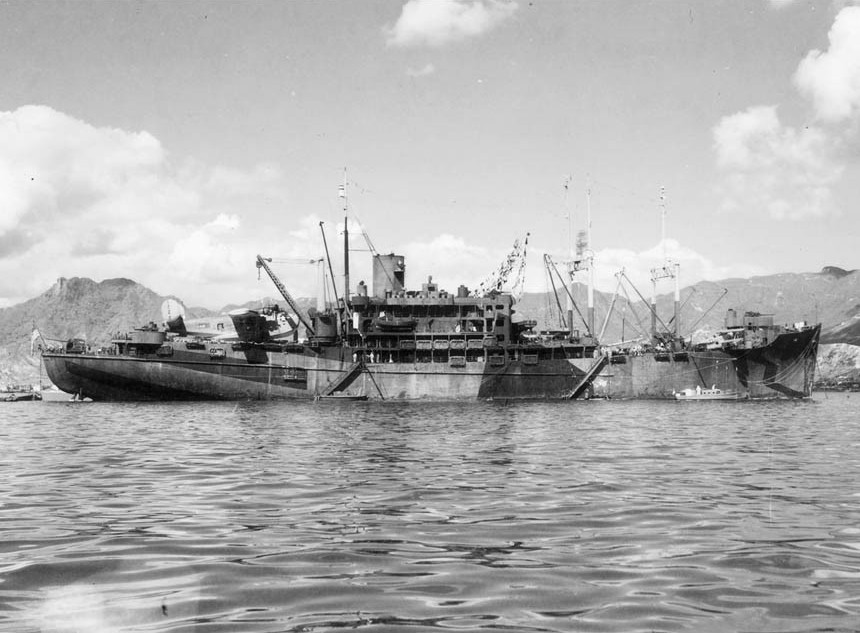
- USS Kenneth Whiting (AV-14)

History

United States
- Name: Kenneth Whiting
- Namesake: Kenneth Whiting (1881-1943), U.S. Navy officer and aviation pioneer
- Builder: Seattle-Tacoma Shipbuilding Company, Seattle, Washington
- Launched: 15 December 1943
- Sponsored by: Mrs. Edna Andresen Whiting
- Commissioned: 8 May 1944
- Decommissioned: 29 May 1947
- Recommissioned: 24 October 1951
- Decommissioned: 30 September 1958
- Stricken: 1 July 1961
- Honors and awards: 2 battle stars (World War II)
- Fate: Sold, 21 February 1962

General characteristics
- Class & type: Kenneth Whiting-class seaplane tender
- Displacement: 8,510 long tons (8,647 t) light; 12,610 long tons (12,812 t) full
- Length: 492 ft (150 m)
- Beam: 69 ft 6 in (21.18 m)
- Draft: 23 ft 9 in (7.24 m)
- Installed power: 3 turbo-drive service generators, 500 kW 450V A.C.
- Propulsion: 1 × Allis-Chalmers steam turbine; 2 × Foster Wheeler D-type boilers, 465 psi 765°; Double Falk main reduction gear; 1 shaft; 8,500 hp (6,338 kW)
- Speed: 19 knots (35 km/h)
- Capacity: 9,675 barrels (1,538.2 m^{3}) NSFO; 760 barrels (121 m^{3}) diesel; 312,475 US gallons (1,182,850 L) gasoline
- Complement: 1,077 (113 officers, 964 enlisted)
- Armament: 2 × single 5"/38 caliber guns; 2 × quad 40 mm AA gun mounts; 2 × dual 40 mm AA gun mounts; 16 × single 20 mm AA gun mounts

USS Kenneth Whiting (AV-14) was the lead ship of her class of seaplane tenders in the United States Navy.

== Namesake ==
Kenneth Whiting (Naval Aviator No. 16) received flight training from the Wright brothers at Dayton, Ohio; and was the first executive officer of the first United States aircraft carrier USS Langley (CV-1). Commander Whiting was credited with many basic tenets of naval carrier aviation, including landing signal officers, pilot ready rooms, a darkroom and photo lab to develop movies of carrier landings, and making pilot qualification a requirement for command of an aircraft carrier.

== Construction and commissioning ==
Kenneth Whiting was launched on 15 December 1943 by Seattle-Tacoma Shipbuilding Corporation, Seattle, Washington; sponsored by Mrs. Edna Andresen Whiting, widow of Captain Kenneth Whiting. Kenneth Whiting was commissioned 8 May 1944.

== Service history ==
=== World War II ===
==== Early operations ====
After shakedown along the United States West Coast, Kenneth Whiting cleared San Diego, California, on 21 July 1944 and arrived at Saipan on 14 August 1944 for operations in the Mariana Islands. Her PB2Y Coronado flying boat squadron made reconnaissance flights which provided valuable data necessary to the success of the Allied operations. At Tanapag Harbor, Saipan, Kenneth Whiting used a former Japanese seaplane ramp to augment her maintenance facilities and increase the availability of planes. She sailed for Kossol Passage on 20 November 1944, relieving the seaplane tender USS Pocomoke (AV-9) there three days later. She remained in the Palau Islands until 5 February 1945.

==== Okinawa ====
Arriving at Ulithi Atoll on 6 February 1945, Kenneth Whiting resumed tending seaplanes. On 11 March 1945 while she was still off Ulithi Atoll, two enemy suicide planes attacked the base. One crashed into Sorlen Island, but the second dove into the aircraft carrier USS Randolph (CV-15).

Kenneth Whiting cleared Ulithi Atoll on 2 April 1945, received provisions and supplies at Guam and Saipan, then steamed to Okinawa, where the Battle of Okinawa was raging. Arriving on 25 April 1945, she immediately commenced combat and search operations. On 11 May 1945 her lookout sighted a group of 29 Koreans waving a white flag on the beach of Gerum Shima. An armed boat party from Kenneth Whiting took them into custody for transfer to the prisoner-of-war camp on Zamami Island. While at Okinawa, Kenneth Whiting operated as fleet post office and as a housing center for aircraft survivors.

At 18:30 on 21 June 1945, five hours after Major General Roy Geiger declared Okinawa secured, a small group of kamikazes penetrated Kerama Retto. Kenneth Whiting shot down a Nakajima Ki-43 (reporting name "Oscar"]]), but part of the plane hit her, causing minor damage and wounding five men. However, she continued operations at Okinawa for the rest of the World War II. During July 1945 her planes flew armed reconnaissance along the coasts of Japan, Korea, and China, locating targets for United States Third Fleet air raids. World War II ended with the surrender of Japan on 2 September 1945.

=== Post-World war II ===
Kenneth Whiting departed Okinawa on 19 September 1945 and anchored at Sasebo, Japan, two days later. She then was assigned to China duty, arriving at Hong Kong on 14 October 1945. Her patrol bombing (VPB) squadron commenced patrol courier service, and continued this until she was relieved 28 November 1945. She arrived at San Francisco, California, on 22 December 1945 with 572 U.S. Navy officers scheduled for release aboard. With the close of the war and the emergence of the Atomic Age, Kenneth Whiting cleared San Diego on 6 May 1946 to operate with support forces during atomic tests at Bikini Atoll. She returned to San Diego 30 August 1946; transferred to San Pedro, Calidfornia, 30 October 1946, and decommissioned there on 29 May 1947.

=== Cold War and Korean War service ===
Kenneth Whiting recommissioned at San Diego on 24 October 1951, and departed for Far Eastern duty 13 March 1952. She arrived at Yokosuka, Japan, on 29 March 1952, where she became the flagship of the Commander, Taiwan Patrol Force (CTF 72). She visited Iwakuni, Okinawa, Taiwan, Subic Bay in the Philippines, and Hong Kong regularly until 16 October 1952, when she departed for the United States.

Following overhaul at Bremerton, Washington, and coastal operations from San Diego, Kenneth Whiting departed on 2 March 1953 for another deployment to the Western Pacific, supporting seaplane activities in Japan in the final months of the Korean War. Hostilities in Korea ended with a ceasefire on 27 July 1953.

After the Korean War, Kenneth Whiting made annual deployments to the Far East in support of United States Seventh Fleet activities. During the summer of 1955, she operated in the Taiwan–Pescadores area in the wake of repeated Chinese Communist harassment of Chinese Nationalist-held islands. On 29 March 1957 she arrived at her new home port, Crescent Harbor, Washington, but departed for another Far Eastern tour on 12 August 1957. She continued operations with the Seventh Fleet until 31 January 1958, when she cleared Subic Bay and headed for Crescent Harbor, which she reached om 10 March 1958.

== Decommissioning and disposal ==
Kenneth Whiting decommissioned at Puget Sound, Washington, on 30 September 1958. She was struck from the Navy List on 1 July 1961 and sold on 21 February 1962 to Union Minerals and Alloys Corporation.

== Honors and awards ==
Kenneth Whiting received two battle stars for World War II.
