= Naval Air Transport Service =

- Active: 1941–1948
- Country: United States
- Branch: United States Navy
- Role: Air transportation
- Size: 26,000 personnel
- Engagements: World War II

Aircraft flown
- Transport: Douglas C-47 Skytrain; Douglas DC-3; Douglas C-54 Skymaster; Consolidated PB2Y Coronado; Martin JRM Mars; Martin PBM Mariner

The Naval Air Transport Service or NATS, was a branch of the United States Navy from 1941 to 1948. At its height during World War II, NATS's totaled four wings of 18 squadrons that operated 540 aircraft with 26,000 personnel assigned.

== Formation, 1941–42 ==
Prior to WW II, The Navy's air transport needs were provided by utility squadrons and aircraft assigned to commands. Five days after Pearl Harbor, Capt. C. H. Schildhauer presented a detailed plan for a naval air transport program to the Secretary of the Navy, Frank Knox. Knox immediate approved the plan and the Naval Air Transport Service was created. This was a tall order since the largest transport operated by the Navy at this time were four R2Ds (DC-2). The first military transport version of the DC-3, the C-47, was first flown on 23 December 1941. Throughout the war, the Navy obtained its R4Ds (C-47) and later the C-54 (R5D) from U.S. Army contracts. Initially, additional DC-3s were appropriated from the commercial airlines. On 9 March 1942, the first NATS squadron, VR-1, was commissioned at NAS Norfolk with four R4D (C-47) aircraft, 27 officers, and 150 men. Initially, most of VR-1 flights were south in support of the Atlantic antisubmarine effort. "VR" is the Navy acronym for transport squadron – "V” is for heavier than air and "R” is for transport.

The next month, the Navy contracted American Airlines to operate an R4D school at Meacham Field, Fort Worth, Texas. The 30-day-long school included 30 hours of flight instruction and 30 hours of inflight observation. Student capacity was 30 per month. The Navy relied heavily on the expertise of former Naval aviators who were working for the commercial airlines and had been recalled to the Navy because of the war.

On 1 April 1942, VR-2 was commissioned at NAS Alameda, California. VR-2 initiated NATS transoceanic service on 15 May, from Alameda to Honolulu with a Sikorsky flying boat. VR-3, NATS's transcontinental squadron was commissioned on 15 July at the Fairfax Airport, Kansas City, Kansas with four DC-3s appropriated from Trans World Airlines. NATS also established its headquarters at Fairfax. In October, NATS moved its operation to the newly completed NAS Olathe, 25 miles to the southwest. The same month, the Pacific Wing Command was established in Honolulu.

== Expansion, 1943 ==
The next year was spent building up the NATS operation. In March 1943, NATS Wing West Coast and NATS Wing Atlantic were formed. NATS received its first R5D(C-54) in the spring of 1943. Seaplane operations were conducted with the transport versions of the Consolidated PB2Y Coronado and the Martin PBM Mariner. NATS utilized the airlines as much as was feasible. Pan American conducted a navigation school at Coral Gables, Florida and American Export Airlines operated a similar navigation school at LaGuardia Airport, NY. By the end of 1943, the American Airlines R4D school expanded to train 50 pilots a month. The Pennsylvania Central Airlines school at Roanoke, Virginia which had been training Army C-47 pilots was taken over by the Navy when the Army cancelled its contract. United Airlines also began training Navy mechanics at the Oakland Airport by the end of the year. All transport pilots were required to be good instrument pilots so all NATS-bound pilots were sent through the Instrument Instructor School at NAS Atlanta. R4D and R5D aircraft commander school was located at Olathe.

NATS also contracted Pan American to operate seaplane transport service from San Francisco to Hawaii. Pan America utilized Martin M-130 China Clippers, Boeing 314s, and Navy supplied Consolidated PB2Y Coronados. Pan Am initially operated out of its prewar terminal at Treasure Island. By 1944, conflict with Navy surface ship traffic around Treasure Island caused Pan Am to move its operation south to Mills Field, now San Francisco International Airport. At the end of September 1944, Pan Am was operating four Boeing 314s and 15 PB2Y plus a few miscellaneous types.

Meanwhile, in March 1943, VR-4 was commissioned at Oakland as a maintenance squadron. The next month VR-6 was established at Dinner Key, Miami and took over transport seaplane training from VR-1. The same month, VR-7, an R4D squadron was formed at NAS Miami to service the Caribbean and South America. VR-7 was based at Miami Municipal, a.k.a. Amelia Earhart Airport, which was a part of the three airfield NAS Miami complex. VR-10 was also commissioned at Honolulu and was primarily a maintenance squadron.

In June, VR-5 was commission at Seattle to provide service to Alaska with R4D and R5Ds. The next month, VR-1 at Norfolk, moved to the recently opened NAS Patuxent River, Maryland. Several months later, VR-8 was established, and took over VR-1s transport seaplane operations. That September, VR-11 formed at Naval Air Station Oakland. VR-11 provided R5D service throughout the South Pacific and was eventually to become the largest VR squadron with over 700 pilots. In November 1943, the Navy took delivery of the first of six Martin PB2M Mars. On 30 November, the PB2M completed a 4,375-mile nonstop flight of 28 hours and 25 minutes, delivering 16,000 pounds of cargo from Patuxent River to Natal, Brazil. With the completion of facilities at NAS Honolulu, VR-11 moved its headquarters there in December.

In December 1943, the Naval Air Ferry Command was established under NATS to take over the mission previously provided by the Aircraft Delivery Units. The mission of the Ferry Command was to ferry aircraft from the factories to the fleet. The Command's headquarters were placed at NAS New York (Floyd Bennett Field) as well as the first squadron, VRF-1. Once a manufacturer, such as Grumman, Vought, or General Motors, deemed an aircraft was ready for delivery to the Navy, the aircraft was flown to NAS New York by the company's pilots. At New York, Navy personnel would check the aircraft and accept it. The Ferry Command would then fly the aircraft to where it was needed. NAS New York accepted over 20,000 aircraft during the course of the war – 25% of the Navy's total. The Air Ferry Command had a pilot training detachment at NAS Willow Grove, Pennsylvania. VRF-2 was established at Columbus, Ohio to accept aircraft from the Curtiss-Wright plant at Columbus and the Goodyear plant at Akron as well as others. Finally VRF-3 was established at NAS San Pedro to accept aircraft from the West Coast manufacturers. VRS-1 was also formed to provide servicing and refueling on the ferry route from New York to the West Coast. Ferrying stops were located at various times at Lynchburg and Petersburg, Virginia; Spartanburg, South Carolina: Knoxville and Nashville, Tennessee; Meridian and Jackson, Mississippi; Little Rock, Arkansas; Shreveport, Louisiana; Tulsa, Oklahoma; Fort Worth, Abilene, Midland, and El Paso, Texas; Tucson, Yuma, and Coolidge, Arizona; and El Centro, California plus others. In December 1944, VFR-4 was established at New York to specialize in the ferrying of seaplanes.

== Full strength, 1944–45 ==
During 1944, NATS was operating at full steam. In June, two additional maintenance squadrons were formed, VR-12 at Honolulu and VR-9 at Patuxent River. VR-13, an additional R4D squadron, was established and was eventually moved to Los Negros in the Admiralty Islands.

In March 1945, VRE-1, a wounded evacuation squadron, was formed out of VR-11 and moved to Guam. VR-11 became the largest squadron in the Navy with 700 pilots, 89 R5Ds and 10 R4Ds. NATS relied heavily on personnel with airline experience. At one time, VR-11 had 47 officers and 10 enlisted men that previously worked for 15 different airlines. One of VR-11's special missions was the delivery of whole blood to Pacific battle areas. Using special refrigerating units, the squadron was delivering 1000 pints a day by the invasion of Iwo Jima.

== Post-war, 1945–48 ==
Following the war, the size of NATS diminished. The major operations at Miami and Olathe were eventually shutdown and the operations at San Francisco and Hawaii greatly reduced. The Naval Air Ferry Command was disbanded. By 1947, the NATS inventory had been reduced to only 116 aircraft. NATS meanwhile had planned for the future and introduced a new aircraft in 1947, the Lockheed R6O (later R6V) Constitution. Design of the Constitution had begun in 1942 for the Navy and Pan American. The Constitution featured a double deck cabin with a passenger capacity of 168 and was powered by four Pratt and Whitney R-4360s. Only two Constitutions were built for the Navy since Pan Am had previously dropped out of the project. The R6V remains to this day as the largest aircraft operated by the Navy.

== Defense department ==
In 1948, the newly created Defense Department, with economy and efficiency as its goal, combined the Air Force's Air Transport Command and NATS into the Military Air Transport Service or MATS. The Navy's contribution to MATS consisted of five squadrons and 58 aircraft. Although NATS was dissolved, the Navy was allowed to retain several transport squadrons for its specific needs. The Navy contribution to MATS and its subsequent command, Military Airlift Command or MAC, lasted until 1967. The demands of the Vietnam War and the resultant pilot shortage caused the Navy to withdraw its commitment.
