= Consolidated PB2Y Coronado =

Patrol bomber in the US Navy

PB2Y Coronado
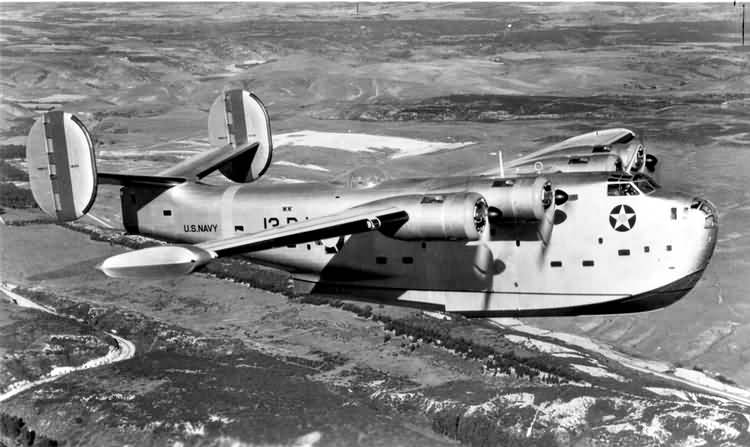
- An early PB2Y-2 in flight.

General information
- Type: Maritime patrol bomber
- Manufacturer: Consolidated Aircraft
- Status: Retired
- Primary users: United States Navy Royal Air Force
- Number built: 217

History
- Introduction date: December 1940
- First flight: December 1937
- Variant: Consolidated XPB3Y

The PB2Y Coronado is a large flying boat patrol bomber designed and produced by Consolidated Aircraft. It was operated by the United States Navy during World War II in bombing, antisubmarine, medical/hospital, and transport roles.

Development of the Coronado began during the interwar period at the behest of the United States Navy's (USN) Bureau of Aeronautics (BuAer). Performing its maiden flight in December 1937, the prototype XPB2Y-1 competed against the XPBS-1, with which it shared a broadly similar design. Although initially prone to stability and control issues, a revised twin-fin tail unit fully resolved these. In October 1938, it performed a high-profile non-stop transcontinental journey to be personally inspected by Franklin D. Roosevelt. Ordered into production in March 1939, the first production standard Coronado was delivered to VP-13 in December 1940. The flying boat was produced in two primary configurations, one with several turrets (including a prominent ball turret in the nose with two .50 cal machine guns) and one unarmed with a clean nose.

Both in the run up to and following the outbreak of the Pacific War, several orders totalling in excess of 600 flying boats were at one point on order, including under Lend-Lease for foreign operators. However, due to quality control issues, a production stoppage was ordered and orders for the type were slashed; deliveries did not resume until fuel tank leakage was properly addressed. Royal Air Force (RAF) plans to use the type as a patrol bomber were curtailed by its inferior range in comparison to the PBY Catalina and Short Sunderland, but did operate ten Coronados in a transport capacity. Despite the issues, Coronados served throughout the conflict as a major component in the USN's Naval Air Transport Service (NATS) across the Pacific theater, which often required transport across vast distances to locations with no prepared airstrips. In one particular high-profile mission during the conflict, a Coronado was used to transport Admiral Nimitz to Tokyo Bay for the signing of the Japanese surrender, ending World War II. In the aftermath of the conflict, one was used by Hughes Aviation. Considered obsolete by the end of the conflict, the surviving Coronados were quickly withdrawn from service. Only one known example remains, at the National Naval Aviation Museum at Naval Air Station Pensacola, Florida.

== Design and development ==
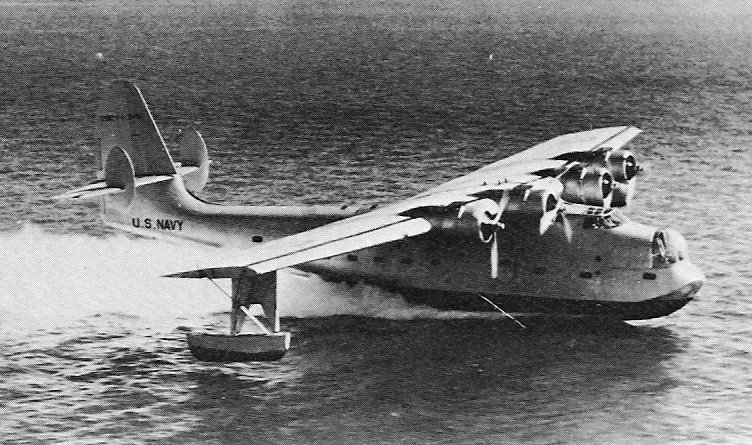
The XPB2Y-1 prototype with a single tail in 1938

The origins of the PB2Y Coronado can be traced back to 1935 and the United States Navy's (USN) Bureau of Aeronautics (BuAer); having recently received the first production PBY Catalina flying boats, BuAer sought the development of the next stage of flying boats, a larger four-engined type that would be suited to the patrol bomber mission. One year later, orders were placed for two prototypes, the XPB2Y-1 from Consolidated Aircraft and the XPBS-1 from Sikorsky Aircraft. Both of these competing flying boats shared the same general configuration, this being a cantilever monoplane with a high-mounted wing, furnished with wingtip floats and a single tail unit. The two design also shared bomb bays located in the inner wing section, defensive turrets on the nose and tail positions. One distinction between the two was that Sikorsky's XPBS-1 had fixed floats while Consolidated's XPB2Y-1 featured a retraction mechanism akin to that of the earlier Catalina. When the wingtip floats were retracted, their buoyant hulls functioning as the wingtips; retracting would also reduce drag and increase range. The price of the PB2Y-2 was US$300,000, which was roughly three times that of the PBY Catalina.

In December 1937, the XPB2Y-1 performed its maiden flight. It quickly exhibited issues related to directional stability and control; the addition of a pair of auxiliary fins proved to be unsatisfactory at fully resolving these undesirable tendencies, but were fully addressed via the adoption of an entirely new twin-tail assembly. In this configuration, the XPB2Y-1 commenced trials at NAS San Diego in August 1938; two months later, it flow a non-stop transcontinental trip to NAS Anacostia to be amongst several aircraft to be personally inspected by Franklin D. Roosevelt. In December 1938, the XPB2Y-1 was damaged when it landed in a large Pacific swell, and was promptly repaired and modified before being formally accepted in early 1939. The XPB2Y-1 subsequently became the flag plane of the USN's Aircraft Scouting Force and would frequently carry VIPs throughout the early 1940s.

During March 1939, Consolidated was awarded a production contract for an initial quantity of six flying boats, designated as the PB2Y-2. In comparison with the XPB2Y-1, the finalised design of the PB2Y-2 was substantially different. One major change was that the new hull was considerably deeper, featuring straight siders and rectangular sections in the middle of the vertical fins and rudders. Other changes included a revised bow turret, the addition of a dorsal blister behind the wing, and a twin tail with very marked dihedral. Furthermore, the adoption of more powerful Pratt & Whitney R-1830 radial engines. Of these, the two inner engines were fitted with four-bladed reversible-pitch propellers while the outer engines drove standard three-bladed feathering propellers. The additional power of the engines was largely cancelled out by the increased weight incurred.

In November 1940, amid the increasingly likelihood of the US becoming involved in World War II, a large order for 200 PB2Ys was placed. Shortly thereafter, it would receive the Coronado name. By June 1941, 626 Coronados of various models had been ordered, 200 of which were intended for Lend-Lease to foreign operators.

Further development of the type continued throughout the conflict, often driven by wartime experiences. The PB2Y-3, which featured self-sealing fuel tanks and additional armor, entered service just after the attack on Pearl Harbor. Service trials of this model had revealed numerous deficiencies, including leaking integral wing fuel tanks and inadequate range. The leaking tank issue forced the Coronado to be temporarily grounded and a full production stoppage was enacted until a proper resolution of the issue had been demonstrated; production plans for the PB2Y-3 was severely cutback in Spring 1943 as military planners began to favour large land-based aircraft instead.

The prototype XPB2Y-4 was powered by four Wright R-2600 radial engines and offered improved performance, but the increases were judged to be insufficient to justify a full fleet update. Instead, the majority of PB2Y-3 models were converted to the PB2Y-5 standard, which involved the replacement of the R-1830 engines with single-stage R-1830-92 models. As most existing PB2Y-3s were used as transports, flying at low altitudes to avoid combat, removing the excess weight of unneeded superchargers allowed an increased payload without harming low-altitude performance.

A prototype of the Consolidated XPB3Y variant was ordered, which was to be a long-range version of the Coronado, but this was ultimately cancelled.

== Operational history ==
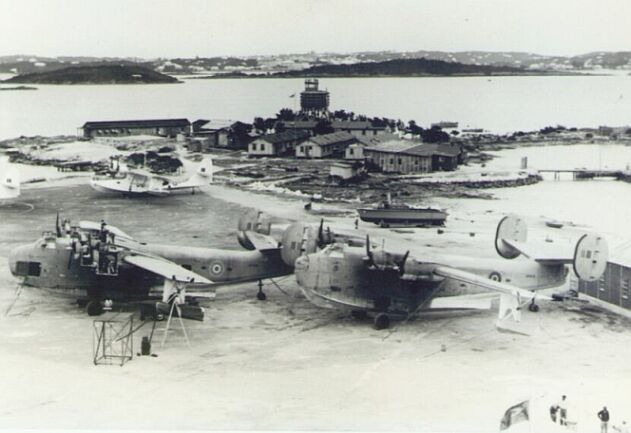
British Coronados and Catalinas at Darrell's Island, Bermuda

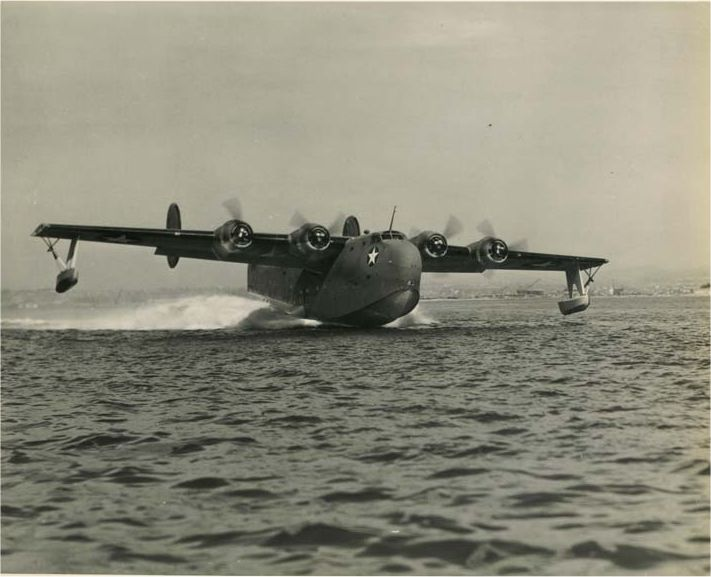
PB2Y taking off in 1942: The Coronado was the largest aircraft in service with the USN at the time.

In December 1940, the first production standard Coronado was delivered to the USN's VP-13; a further four flying boats would be delivered by mid-1941, by which point trials of the type had been largely completed.

Following the outbreak of the Pacific War, the Coronado served in combat across the Asiatic-Pacific theater with the USN, being used in both bombing and anti-submarine roles. Several Coronados carried out four bombing raids on Wake Island between 30 January and 9 February 1944. However, the majority served as transport and hospital aircraft, and additional tasks included executive transport and search and rescue. In this capacity, the type was often stripped of most military apparatus for increased endurance, which enabled the Coronado to fly between Australia and Hawaii, and thus became an important asset upon the formation of the Naval Air Transport Service (NATS).

The British Royal Air Force Coastal Command had originally intended to use the Coronado as a maritime patrol bomber, as it already operated the PBY Catalina, but the range of the Coronado (1,070 miles) compared poorly with the Catalina (2,520 mi) and the Short Sunderland (1,780 mi). Consequently, the Coronados supplied to the RAF under Lend-Lease were outfitted purely as transports, serving with RAF Transport Command. These ten flying boats were used for transatlantic flights, staging through the RAF base at Darrell's Island, Bermuda, and Puerto Rico, though the aircraft were used to deliver vital cargo and equipment in a transportation network that stretched along both sides of the Atlantic, from Newfoundland to Brazil, and to Nigeria, and other parts of Africa. After the war ended, five of the RAF aircraft were scrapped, one was already lost in collision with a Martin PBM Mariner, and the last four were scuttled off the coast of Bermuda in 1946.

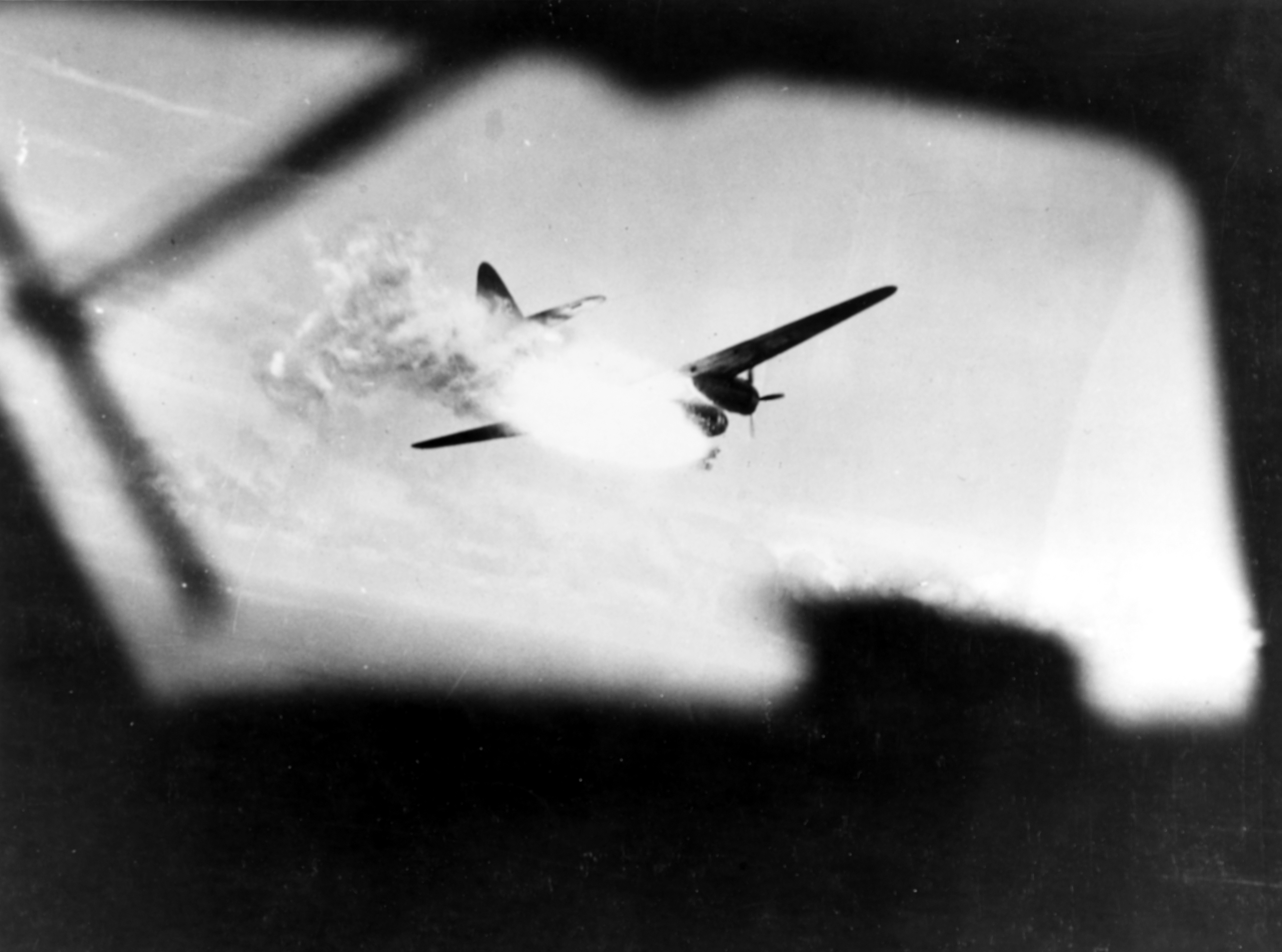
A PB2Y Coronado shot down a G4M "Betty" in 1944.

In combat missions, PB2Ys claimed five enemy aircraft shot down over the course of WWII. Likewise, an example of one lost to combat is at Kerema Rhetto, Okinawa, on 5 May 1945. In one example of a search-and-rescue mission a PB2Y landed hard on the water of Kagoshima Bay to rescue a downed pilot. Unable to take off again, a PBM Mariner picked up the crew and pilot, then scuttled the aircraft with a strafe.

While the Coronado had been originally been acquired as combat patrol aircraft, the type's limitations led to them being quickly relegated to transport service in the American naval air fleet. By early 1945, the availability of long-distance land-based transport aircraft, such as the C-54 Skymaster, led to NATS quickly reducing its reliance on the PB2Y. Hence, by the end of World War II, the Coronado had become outmoded as both a bomber and a transport, and virtually all remaining flying boats were quickly scrapped by the summer of 1946, being melted down to aluminum ingots and sold as metal scrap, or used as targets for fighter gunnery practice.

After the conflict, several ended up being used by civilian operators; one Coronado was reportedly bought by Howard Hughes to practice water landings for the 1947 flight of the Hughes H-4 Hercules.

== Variants ==
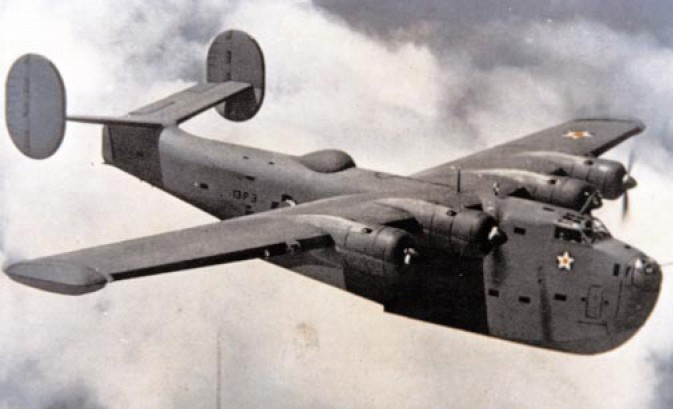
PB2Y-2 in 1941

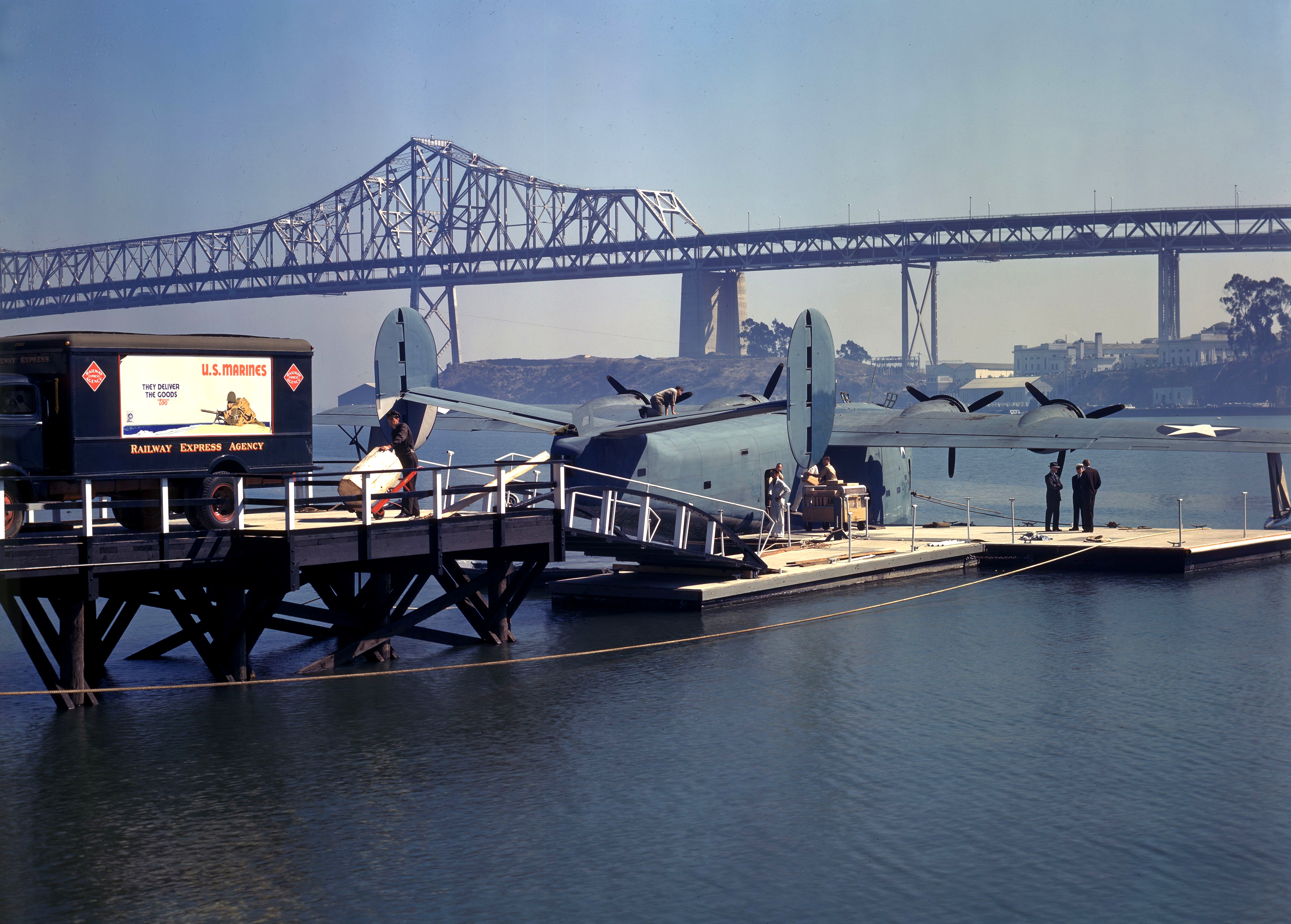
PB2Y-3R unloading at a dock, 1943

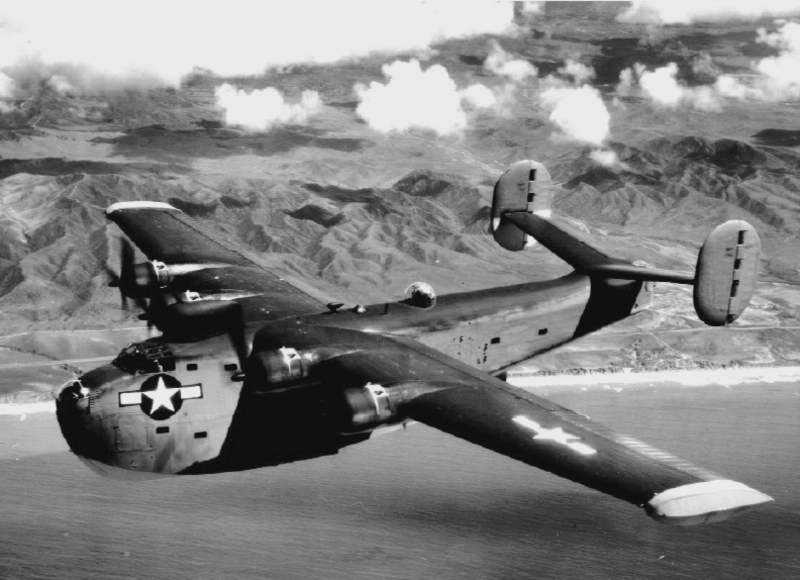
PB2Y in 1944 in the Pacific

The bulk of the production was the PB2Y-3, with 210 produced; it featured turrets. Significant numbers of the unarmed transport version were also produced or converted from existing versions.

Coronado I
RAF Designation for PB2Y-3
XPB2Y-1
Prototype with four 1,050 hp (780 kW) Pratt & Whitney XR-1830-72 Twin Wasp, engines, one built.
PB2Y-2
Evaluation variant with four 1,020 hp (760 kW) Pratt & Whitney R-1830-78 Twin Wasp engines, modified hull and six 0.5 in (13 mm) guns, six built
XPB2Y-3
One PB2Y-2 converted as prototype for PB2Y-3
PB2Y-3
Production variant with four 1,200 hp (890 kW) Pratt & Whitney R-1830-88 Twin Wasp engines and eight 0.5 in (13 mm) guns, 210 built
PB2Y-3B
Lend-lease designation for Royal Air Force aircraft
PB2Y-3R
PB2Y-3s converted by Rohr Aircraft Corp as freighters with faired-over turrets, side loading hatch, and seating for 44 passengers, 31 built
XPB2Y-4
One PB2Y-2 re-engined with four 1,600 hp (1,200 kW) Wright R-2600 Cyclone 14 engines
XPB2Y-5
The XP2BY-3 converted as PB2Y-5 prototype.
PB2Y-5
PB2Y-3s converted with four 1,200 hp (890 kW) Pratt & Whitney R-1830-92 Twin Wasp engines, increased fuel capacity and provision for rocket-assisted take-off gear
PB2Y-5R
PB2Y-5s converted as unarmed transports, some were fitted for the medical-evacuation role, which could hold up to 25 stretchers

== Operators ==
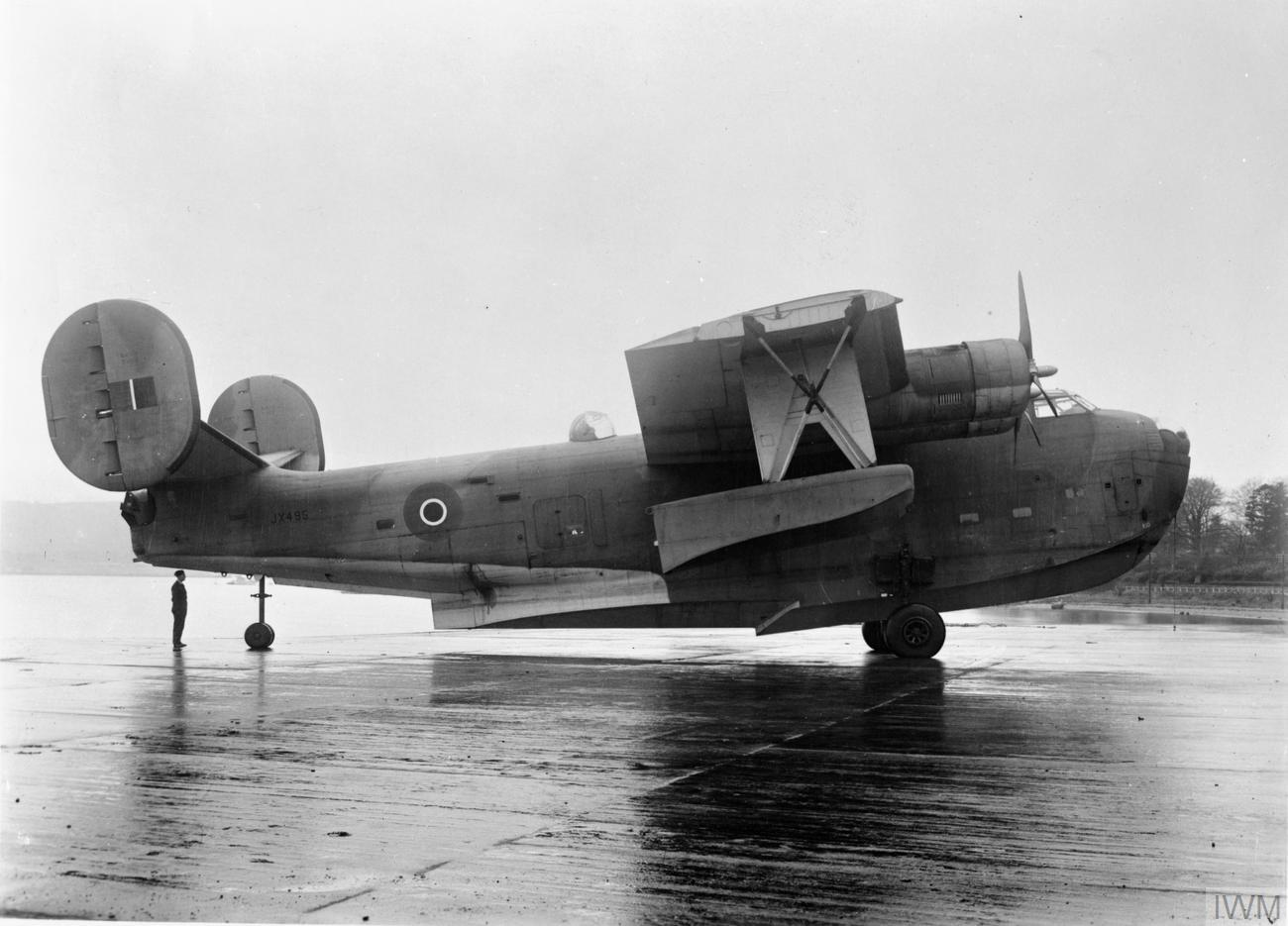
Coronado GR.I at RAE Helensburgh in 1944

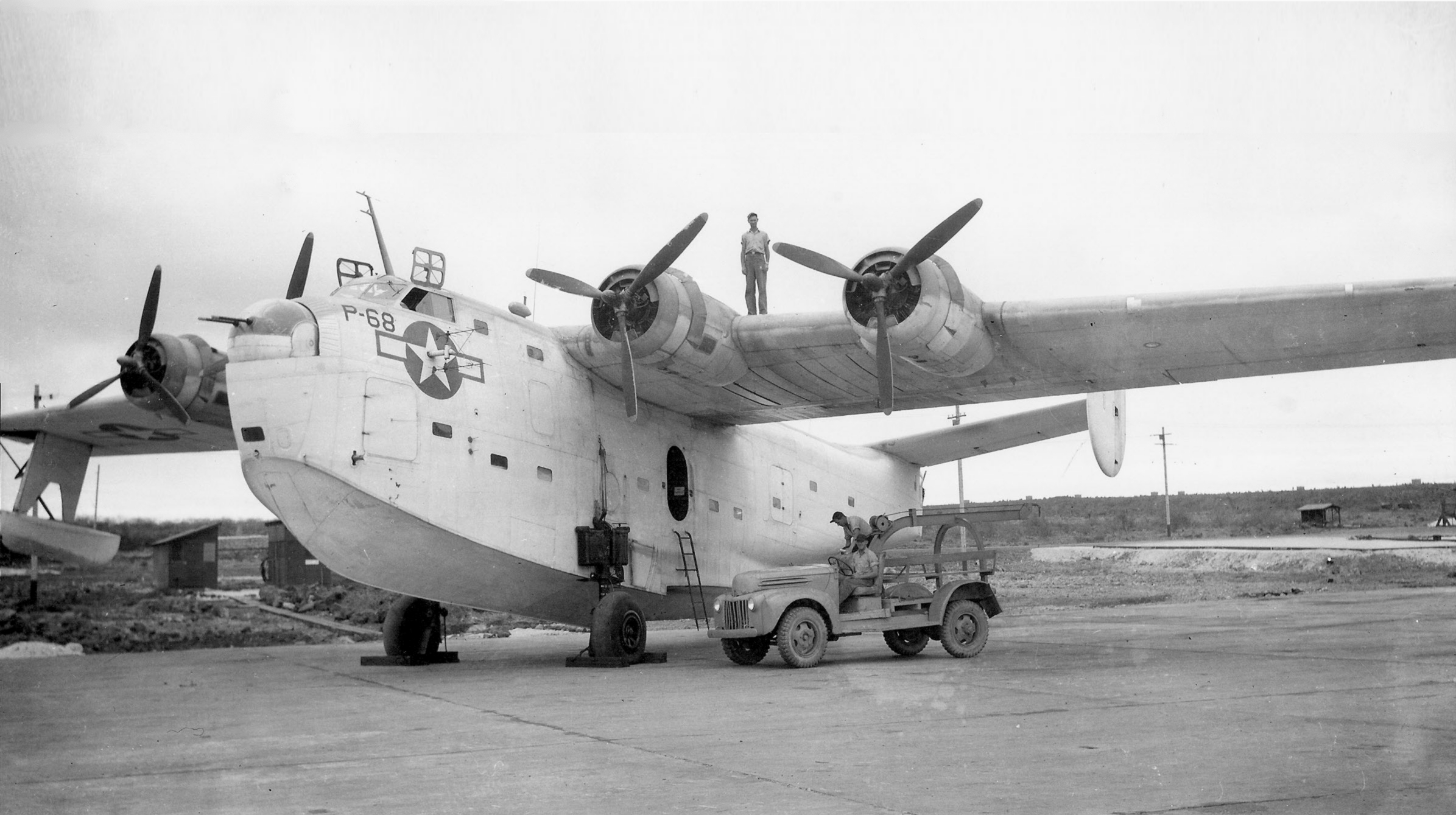
PB2Y-3 of VPB-1 at Galapagos naval air station in 1945

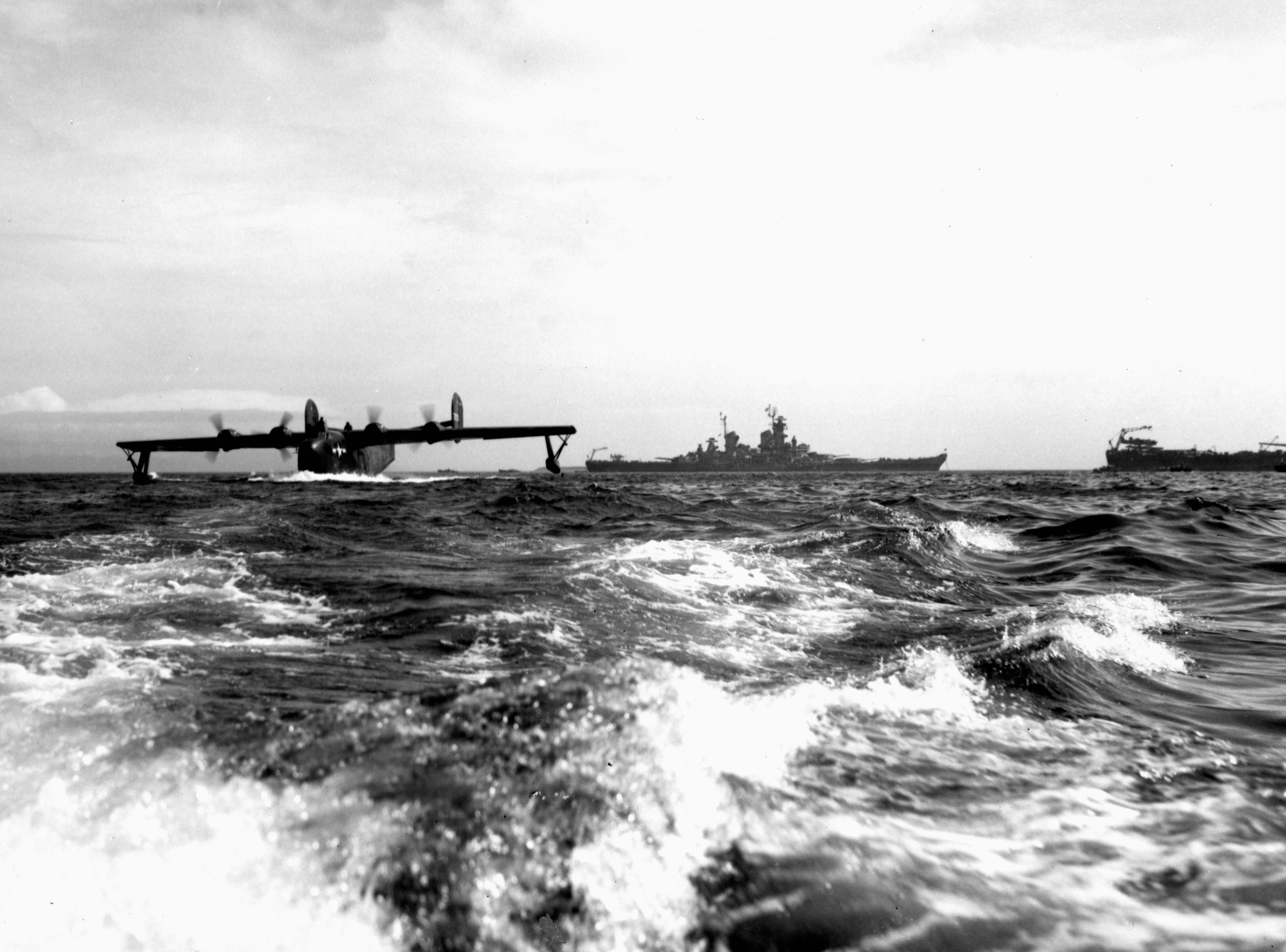
Nimitz arrives in Tokyo to conclude WWII

The main operator was the USN, and some served with the U's RAF, five served with United States Coast Guard, with some civilian use after the war

United Kingdom

- Royal Air Force
  - No. 231 Squadron RAF

United States

- United States Navy
  - FAW-2
  - FAW-3
  - FAW-5
  - FAW-14
  - VPB-1
  - VPB-4
  - VPB-13
  - VPB-15
  - VPB-100
  - VP-102
  - VR-2
  - VR-6
  - VR-8
  - VE-1
  - VH-1
- United States Coast Guard

== Wrecks ==
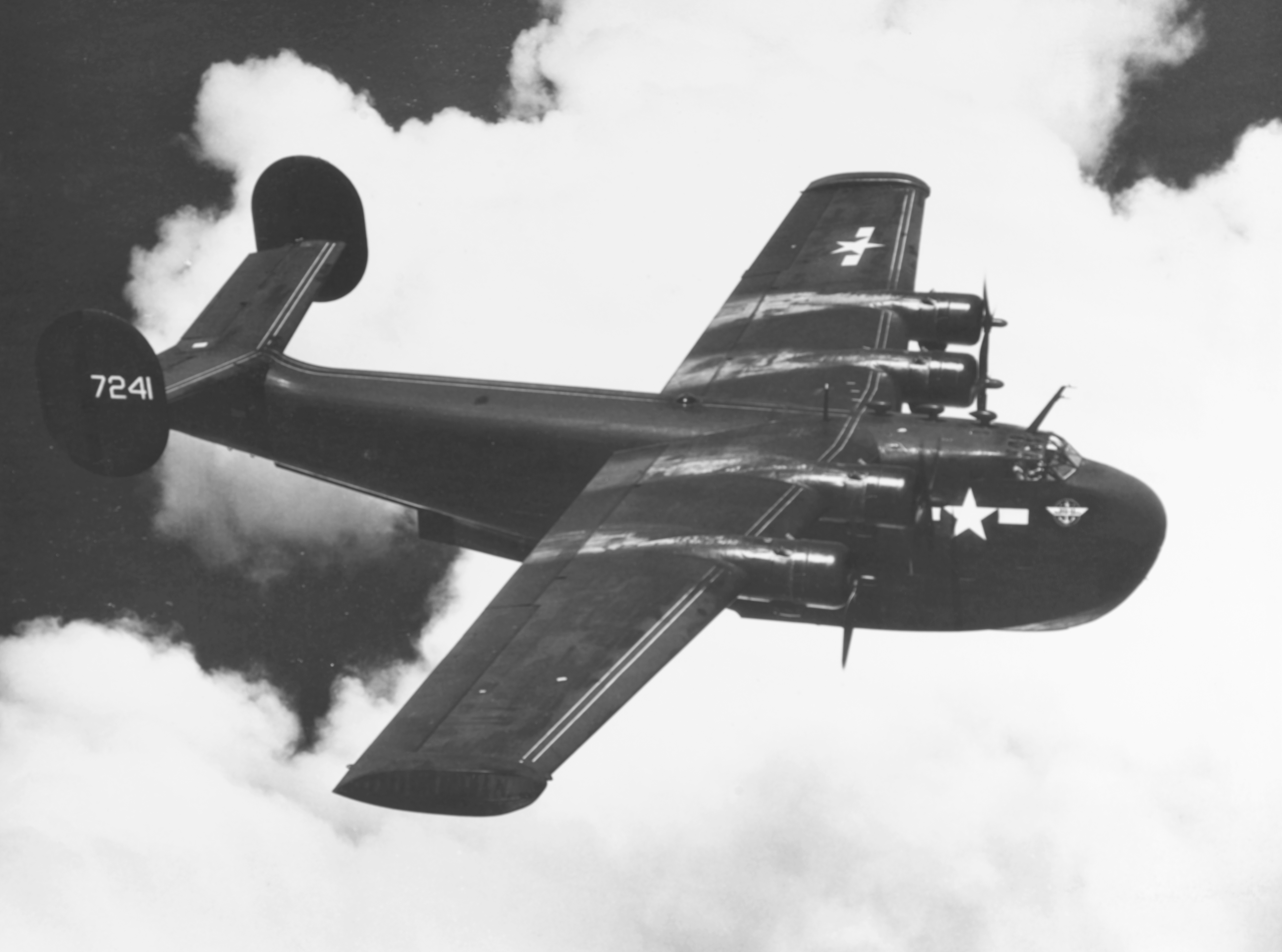
This PB2Y-5R crashed 6 December 1944 at Kanton Island in Phoenix Islands (modern-day Kiribati)

The many accidents with the PB2Y were of different types.

A sunken PB2Y Coronado is in Tanapag Lagoon of Saipan. This wreck has been studied for marine archeology.

After the capture of Ebeye from the Japanese, it was used as seaplane stopover for flying boats transiting the Pacific. At least three Coronados crashed near Naval Air Base Ebeye Island, at Kwajalein Atoll.

- On 14 September 1944, a PB2Y-3 broke apart during practice landings, killing one person.
- On 12 February 1945, a PB2Y-5R crashed on landing from a trip from Honolulu, ripping off the nose and sinking claiming two lives.
- In February 1944, a PB2Y ran into a reef while taxiing and subsequently broke up and sank in the lagoon.

Some of these wrecks were discovered in the early 21st century; and in some cases, are visited by divers.

Additional examples:

- On 6 May 1942, a PB2Y crashed and sank in Pearl Harbor, Hawaii, during an emergency landing, claiming the lives of two.
- On 27 December 1942, one crashed landed on the Salton Sea, killing six.
- On 21 May 1943, one crashed with the loss of all crew at Little Creek, Virginia, USA.
- On 23 May 1943, a PB2Y ran out of fuel near Bermuda; on landing, the right pontoon ripped off and the aircraft rolled over and sank.
- On 24 May 1943, a PB2Y broke in two when it was forced to land on the ground at San Miguel Rea, Mexico.
- On 26 November 1943, a PB2Y crashed while landing during a training flight at NAS Alameda, USA.
- On 1 January 1944, nine perished in a crash in the Great Sound of Bermuda, and another crashed at Bermuda on 26 May 1943.
- On 17 February 1944, a PB2Y engine failed during takeoff, causing it to crash into a barracks, killing two on the ground and seven of 12 on the aircraft.
- At Galapagos, Ecuador, on 17 July 1944, a landing accident (nosing over) killed five.
- On 31 July 1944, on takeoff from Funafuti Lagoon, a wing clipped a ship's jackstaff, causing a crash and killing 22.
- On 17 October 1944, one crashed into Coronado Island near San Diego, California.
- On 6 December 1945, a PB2Y-5R (no. 7241) crashed at Canton Island.
- On 22 June 1945, a PB2Y landed at sea on a flight between Ebeye and Saipan. All were rescued, but the aircraft later sank.

== Surviving aircraft ==
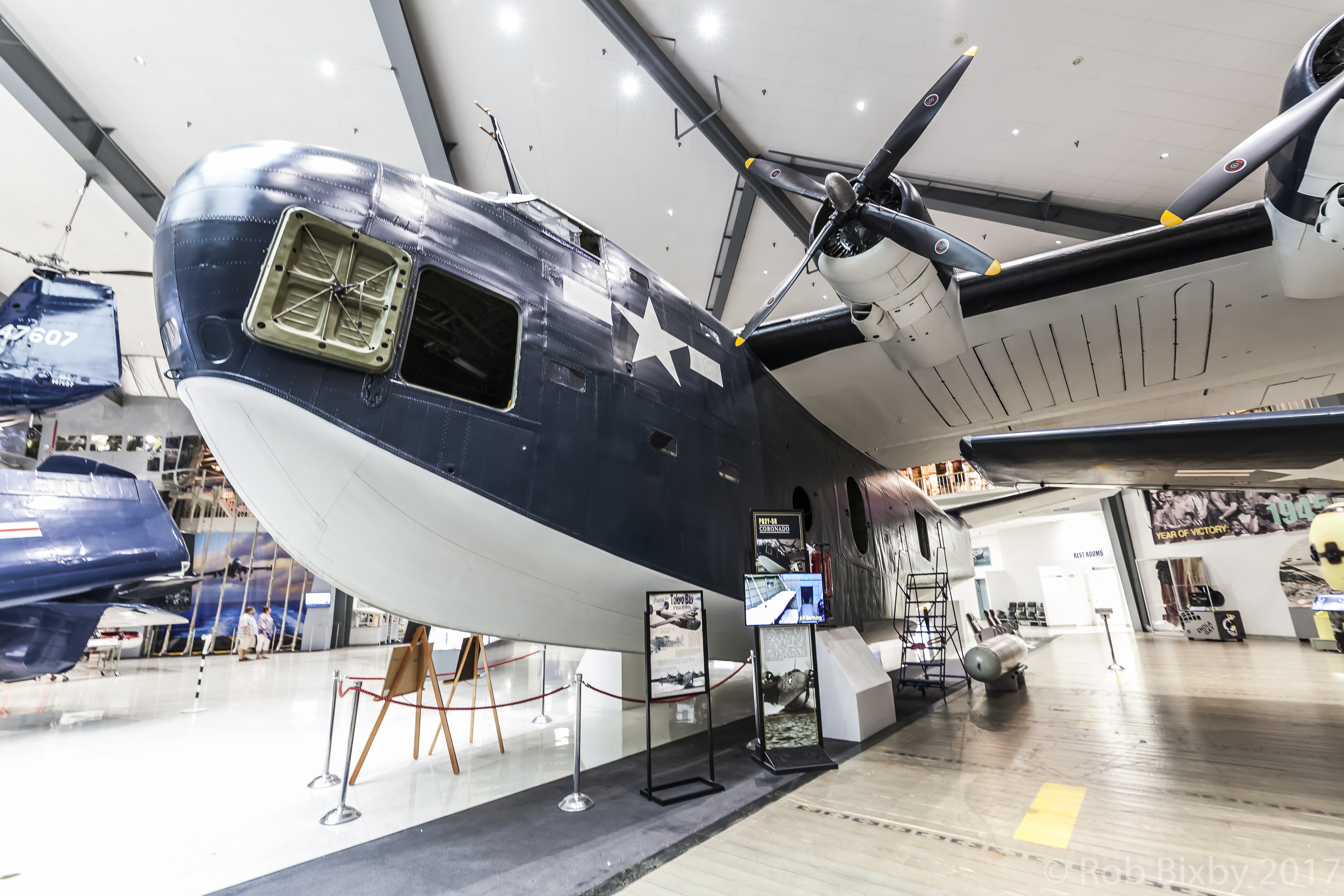
The surviving transport Coronado in the USA. This one delivered Nimitz to Tokyo for the signing of the Japanese surrender (V-J Day)

- BuNo 7099 – National Naval Aviation Museum, Naval Air Station Pensacola, Pensacola, Florida

== Specifications (PB2Y-5) ==
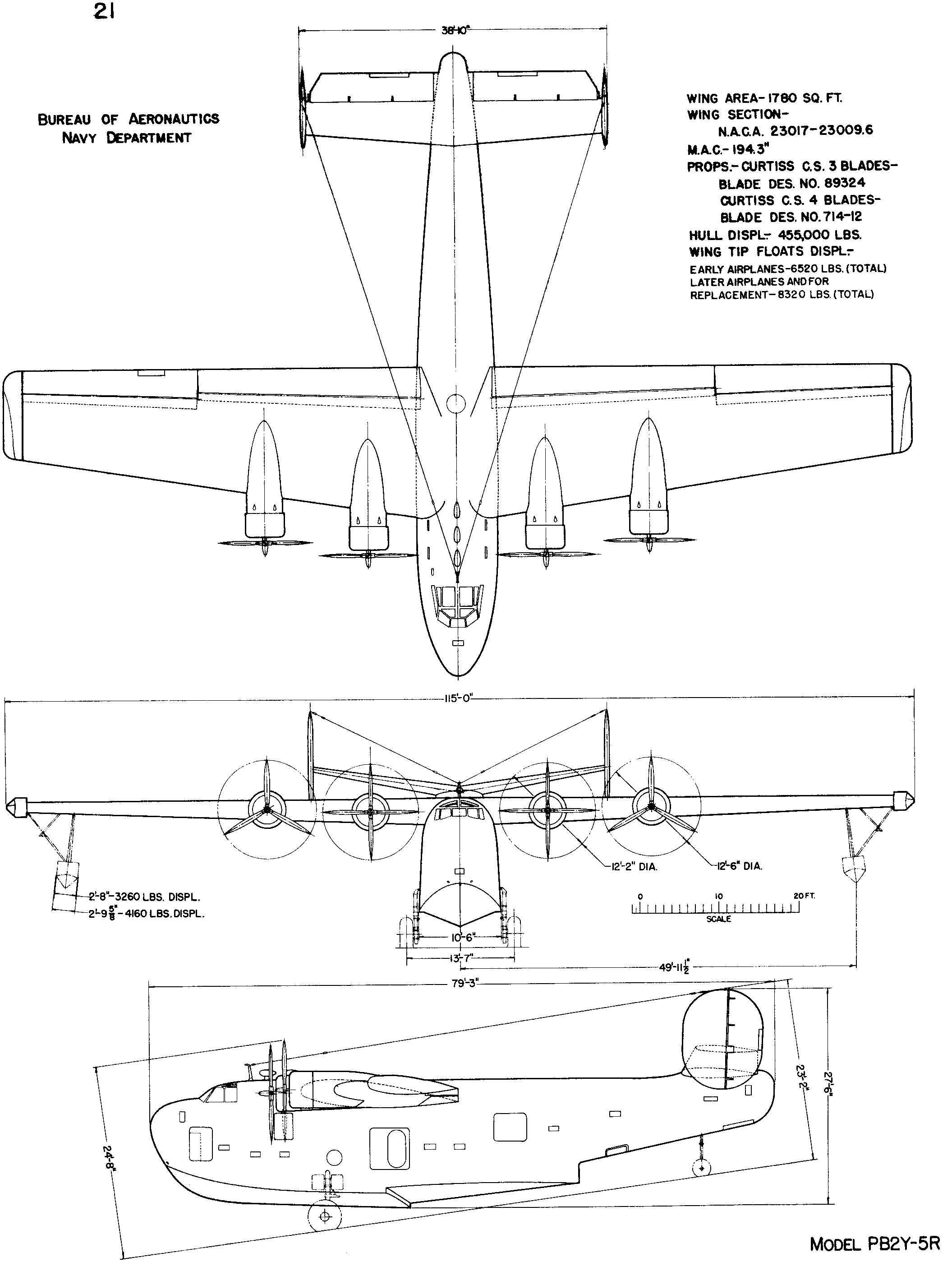
Three-view line drawing of the Consolidated PB2Y-5R Coronado

Data from Jane's Fighting Aircraft of World War II

General characteristics

- Crew: ten
- Length: 79 ft 3 in (24.2 m)
- Wingspan: 115 ft 0 in (35 m)
- Height: 27 ft 6 in (8.4 m)
- Wing area: 1,780 sq ft (165 m^{2})
- Empty weight: 40,850 lb (18,530 kg)
- Max takeoff weight: 66,000 lb (30,000 kg)
- Powerplant: 4 × Pratt & Whitney R-1830-92 radial engines, 1,200 hp (900 kW) each

Performance

- Maximum speed: 194 mph (310 km/h, 168 kn)
- Cruise speed: 170 mph (272 km/h, 148 kn)
- Range: 1,070 mi (1,720 km, 930 nmi) at 131 mph (210 km/h)
- Service ceiling: 20,500 ft (6,250 m)

Armament

- Guns: ** 6 × .50 in (12.7 mm) M2 Browning machine guns in twin nose, dorsal, and tail powered turrets
  - 2 × .50 in M2 Browning machine guns in manual waist mounts
- Bombs: ** 2 × Mark 13 torpedoes or
  - Up to 12,000 lb (5,400 kg) of bombs, housed in the wings

== In popular culture ==
Victor Bergeron created a PB2Y cocktail for his Tiki bars (Trader Vic's) in honor of World War II airmen.

== See also ==
Related development

- Consolidated PBY Catalina
- Consolidated XP4Y Corregidor

Aircraft of comparable role, configuration, and era

- Beriev Be-6
- Blohm & Voss BV 222 Wiking
- Boeing 314 Clipper (Served along with PB2Y as C-98)
- Boeing XPBB Sea Ranger
- Kawanishi H6K
- Kawanishi H8K
- Martin PBM Mariner
- Short Sunderland
- Sikorsky XPBS-1

Related lists

- List of military aircraft of the United States
- List of aircraft of World War II
