= Consolidated XPB3Y =

Flying boat prototype

General information
- Type: Patrol bomber
- Manufacturer: Consolidated
- Status: Cancelled
- Primary user: United States Navy
- Number built: 0

History
- Developed from: PB2Y Coronado

The Consolidated XPB3Y was a proposed extra-long-range flying boat for patrol and bombardment missions, developed from the earlier PB2Y Coronado. The United States Navy ordered the construction of a prototype on April 2, 1942. On November 4 of the same year, however, the aircraft was cancelled due to the higher priority accorded to other Consolidated projects.

== Specifications (February 1942 proposal) ==
Data from Wagner, 1968, p. 307

General characteristics

- Length: 104 ft 8 in (31.90 m)
- Wingspan: 169 ft 0 in (51.5 m)
- Gross weight: 121,500 lb (55,111 kg)
- Powerplant: 4 × Pratt & Whitney R-2800-18W radial piston engines, 2,450 hp (1,830 kW) each

Performance

- Maximum speed: 241 mph (388 km/h, 209 kn)
- Service ceiling: 22,500 ft (6,900 m)

Armament
two 20-mm guns, ten .50-cal MGs, 10 tons of bombs

== See also ==
Related development

- PB2Y Coronado

Aircraft of comparable role, configuration, and era

- Short Sunderland
- Kawanishi H8K

Related lists

- List of United States Navy aircraft designations (pre-1962)
