= VPB-15 =

Patrol Bombing Squadron 15
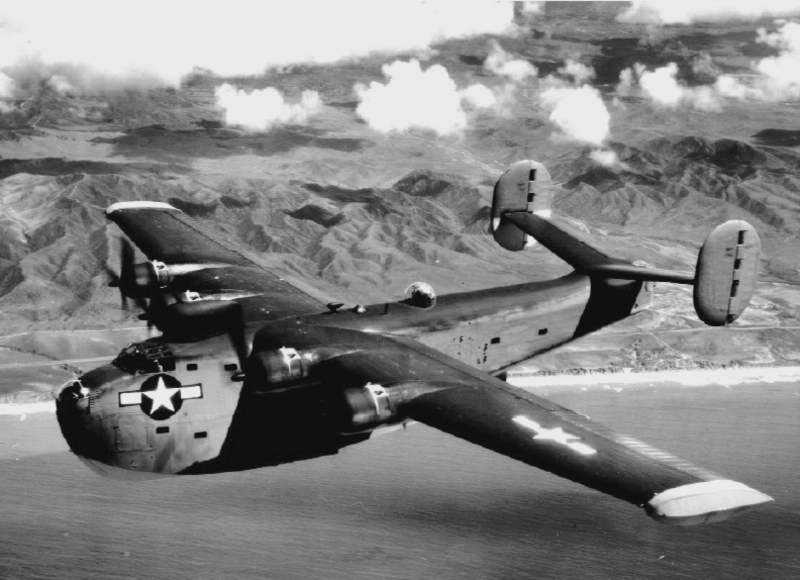
- VP-15 PB2Y-3 in 1944
- Active: 15 March 1943 – 23 November 1945
- Country: United States of America
- Branch: United States Navy
- Type: squadron
- Role: Maritime patrol
- Engagements: World War II

Aircraft flown
- Patrol: PB2Y-3/5

VPB-15 was a Patrol Bombing Squadron of the U.S. Navy. The squadron was established as Patrol Squadron 15 (VP-15) on 15 March 1943, redesignated Patrol Bombing Squadron 15 (VPB-15) on 1 October 1944 and disestablished on 23 November 1945.

== Operational history ==
- 15 March 1943: VP-15 was established at NAS San Diego, California, under the operational control of FAW-14. The squadron was equipped with the PB2Y-3 Coronado heavy seaplane.
- 15 May 1943: Upon completion of the squadron shakedown of personnel and equipment, VP-15 was transferred to NAS Bermuda under the operational control of FAW-5. Principal duties were to provide ASW, patrol searches and convoy coverage along the eastern seaboard. On 1 August 1943, administrative control shifted from FAW-5 to FAW-9.
- 21 April 1944: VP-15 was transferred to NAS Coco Solo, Panama Canal Zone, under the operational control of FAW-3. One detachment was deployed to Corinto, Nicaragua, and a second to the Galapagos Islands.
- 15 October 1944: VP-15 was transferred NAS San Diego, under the operational control of FAW-14. The squadron was reformed, training for all hands commenced, and refitting of all equipment was begun in preparation for transfer to the South Pacific.
- 1 December 1944: The squadron's well-worn PB2Y-3 aircraft were replaced with 15 new PB2Y-5s fresh from the factory.
- 2 March 1945: VPB-15 began the transpac to NAS Kaneohe Bay, Hawaii. All 15 aircraft arrived safely. After a brief period for settling in, the squadron began a period of intense training in preparation for combat.
- 12 April 1945: The squadron departed NAS Kaneohe Bay for Tanapag Harbor, Saipan, arriving on 15 April, where it commenced daily patrols and antishipping patrols immediately upon arrival. During this period the squadron came under the operational control of FAW-1.
- 4 May 1945: The Search and Reconnaissance Command was established at NAB Saipan under the operational control of FAW-18. VPB-15 was brought into this command shortly thereafter.
- 16 May 1945: A detachment of three aircraft was sent to Kerama Retto. The remainder of the squadron at Saipan continued long-range patrols, and on 1 July 1945, extended them to Marcus Island. By the end of September 1945 the squadron was based ashore at NAB Saipan, awaiting orders to stand down.
- 23 November 1945: VPB-15 was disestablished at Saipan.

== Aircraft assignments ==
The squadron was assigned the following aircraft, effective on the dates shown:

- PB2Y-3 - March 1943
- PB2Y-5 - December 1944

== Home port assignments ==
The squadron was assigned to these home ports, effective on the dates shown:

- NAS San Diego, California - 15 March 1943
- NAS Bermuda - 15 May 1943
- NAS Coco Solo, Panama Canal Zone - 21 April 1944
- NAS San Diego - 15 October 1944
- NAS Kaneohe Bay, Hawaii - 2 March 1945
- NAB Saipan - 12 April 1945

== See also ==
- Maritime patrol aircraft
- List of inactive United States Navy aircraft squadrons
- List of United States Navy aircraft squadrons
- List of squadrons in the Dictionary of American Naval Aviation Squadrons
- History of the United States Navy
