= Curtiss SBC Helldiver =

US navy biplane

SBC Helldiver
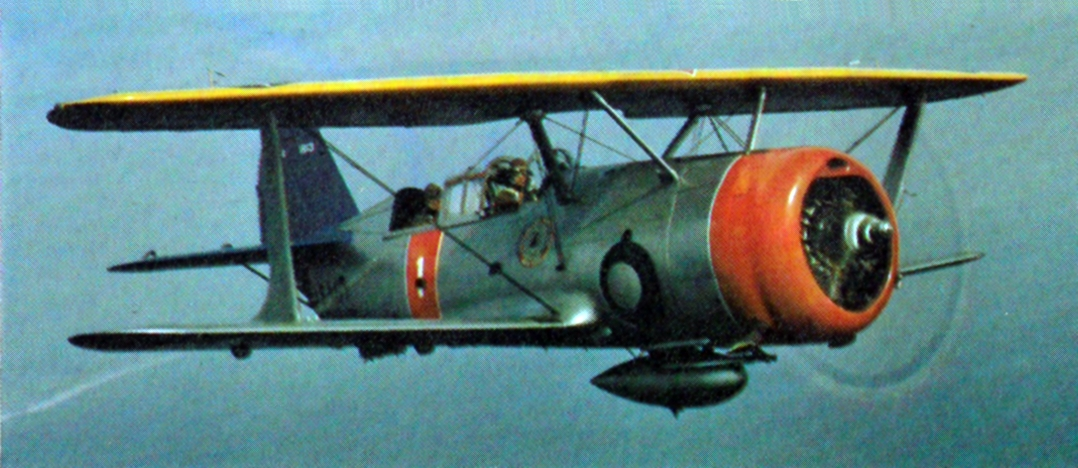
- SBC-4 BuNo 1813 was one of the aircraft later sold to France

General information
- Type: Dive bomber
- Manufacturer: Curtiss-Wright
- Primary users: United States Navy United States Marine Corps; Royal Air Force; French Navy
- Number built: 257 Number preserved 0 Number scrapped 44, presumably all Helldivers were withdrawn or scrapped by 1943

History
- Introduction date: 1938
- First flight: 9 December 1935
- Retired: 1943

The Curtiss SBC Helldiver was a two-seat scout bomber and dive bomber built by the Curtiss-Wright Corporation. It was the last combat military biplane procured by the United States Navy. Delivered in 1937, the aircraft became obsolete before the start of World War II.

== Development ==
There was controversy in the United States Navy's Bureau of Aeronautics (BuAer) in the early 1930s regarding two-seat fighter planes, monoplanes and the retractable undercarriage. In 1931, the Navy issued Design Specification No. 113, which detailed a requirement for a high-performance fighter with fixed undercarriage to be powered by the Wright R-1510 or Pratt & Whitney's R-1535 radial engine. Seven companies submitted proposals and two companies, the Douglas Aircraft with their XFD-1 and the Chance Vought with their XF3U-1 were given contracts for one prototype each. Both of these aircraft were two-seat biplanes. The Navy then asked Curtiss to supply a prototype of a two-seat monoplane which was technically more advanced.

On 30 June 1932, BuAer signed a contract with Curtiss to design a two-seat monoplane with a parasol wing a retractable undercarriage and powered by a 625 hp (466 kW) Wright R-1510-92 fourteen cylinder, two row, air-cooled radial engine driving a two-blade propeller. This fighter was designated XF12C-1.

== Design ==
The SBC was an all-metal, two-seat scout-bomber biplane with "I"-type interplane struts. It was the last combat biplane the Navy purchased and the last combat biplane manufactured in the United States. The two crewmen, pilot and radio operator/gunner, were housed in tandem cockpits enclosed by a sliding canopy and the turtle deck behind the rear cockpit could be folded down to allow the gunner to use his machine gun. The wings, rudder, elevators and flaps were fabric-covered. The main landing gear retracted into wheel wells in the fuselage just forward of the lower wing and the tailwheel retracted into the fuselage.

=== XF12C-1 (Curtiss Model 73) ===
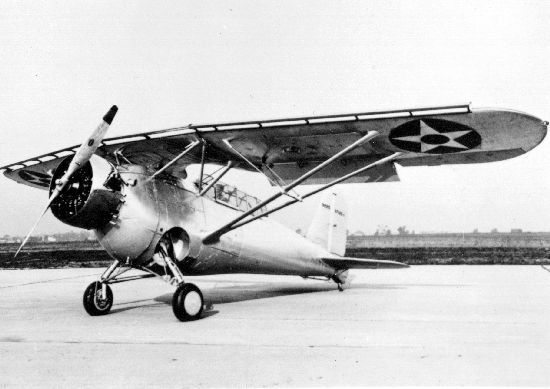
The XF12C-1

This aircraft was initially powered by a Wright R-1510-92 engine but this was unsuitable so the aircraft was re-engined with a 775 hp (578 kW) Wright R-1670 fourteen cylinder, two row, air-cooled radial engine, which was also unsatisfactory. Both of these engines were prototypes and neither went into production. Finally, the 700 hp (520 kW) Wright R-1820-80 nine cylinder, single row, air-cooled radial engine was installed and the resulting aircraft, designated XF12C-1 flew in 1933. Designed for aircraft carrier usage, the parasol wing folded back, a new feature for the Navy, for storage and the aircraft had an exposed tail hook for carrier landings. The first flight was in July 1933 but in September 1934, the parasol wing failed in the dive bomber tests.

=== XS4C-1 (Curtiss Model 73) ===
After testing, the XF12C-1 was rejected as a fighter, and on 7 December 1933 this aircraft was redesignated in the scout category as the XS4C-1 and re-engined with a 700 hp (520 kW) Wright R-1820-80 radial engine driving a two-blade propeller. In its role as a scouting aircraft, bombing equipment for a 500 lb (230 kg) bomb had to be designed and provided.

=== XSBC-1 (Curtiss Model 73) ===
In January 1934, the designation "Scout Bomber" (SB) was introduced and the aircraft was finally redesignated XSBC-1. In early 1934, flight tests, especially dive-bombing, began. On 14 June 1934, this aircraft crashed- attributed to wing failure- in Lancaster, New York, about 6 mi (9.7 km) from the Curtiss plant, during one of the tests, and it was destroyed.

=== XSBC-2 (Curtiss Model 77) ===
Curtiss-Wright made a proposal to the Navy to build one replacement aircraft which would be a staggered-wing biplane, would not have folding wings but would have leading-edge slots and the lower wing would have full-span flaps. It was an all-metal aircraft with fabric-covered control surfaces. It was powered by a 700 hp (520 kW) Wright XR-1510-12 fourteen-cylinder, twin-row, air-cooled engine driving a constant speed Curtiss Electric three-blade propeller, and it featured an enlarged canopy, an enlarged vertical fin and rudder, and a retractable tail hook. The XSBC-2 had to engage in competitive tests against the Great Lakes Aircraft's XB2G-1 and the Grumman Aircraft Engineering's XSBF-1. The XSBC-2 won and a contract for this aircraft was signed in April 1935; it made its first flight on 9 December 1935.

=== XSBC-3 (Curtiss Model 77) ===
The Wright XR-1510-12 engine in the XSBC-2 proved to be mechanically unreliable. In March 1936, this aircraft was re-engined with a 700 hp (520 kW) Pratt & Whitney R-1535-82 fourteen-cylinder, twin-row, air-cooled engine driving a three-blade propeller and redesignated XSBC-3. With this new configuration, the Navy placed a production order.

=== SBC-3 (Curtiss Model 77A) ===
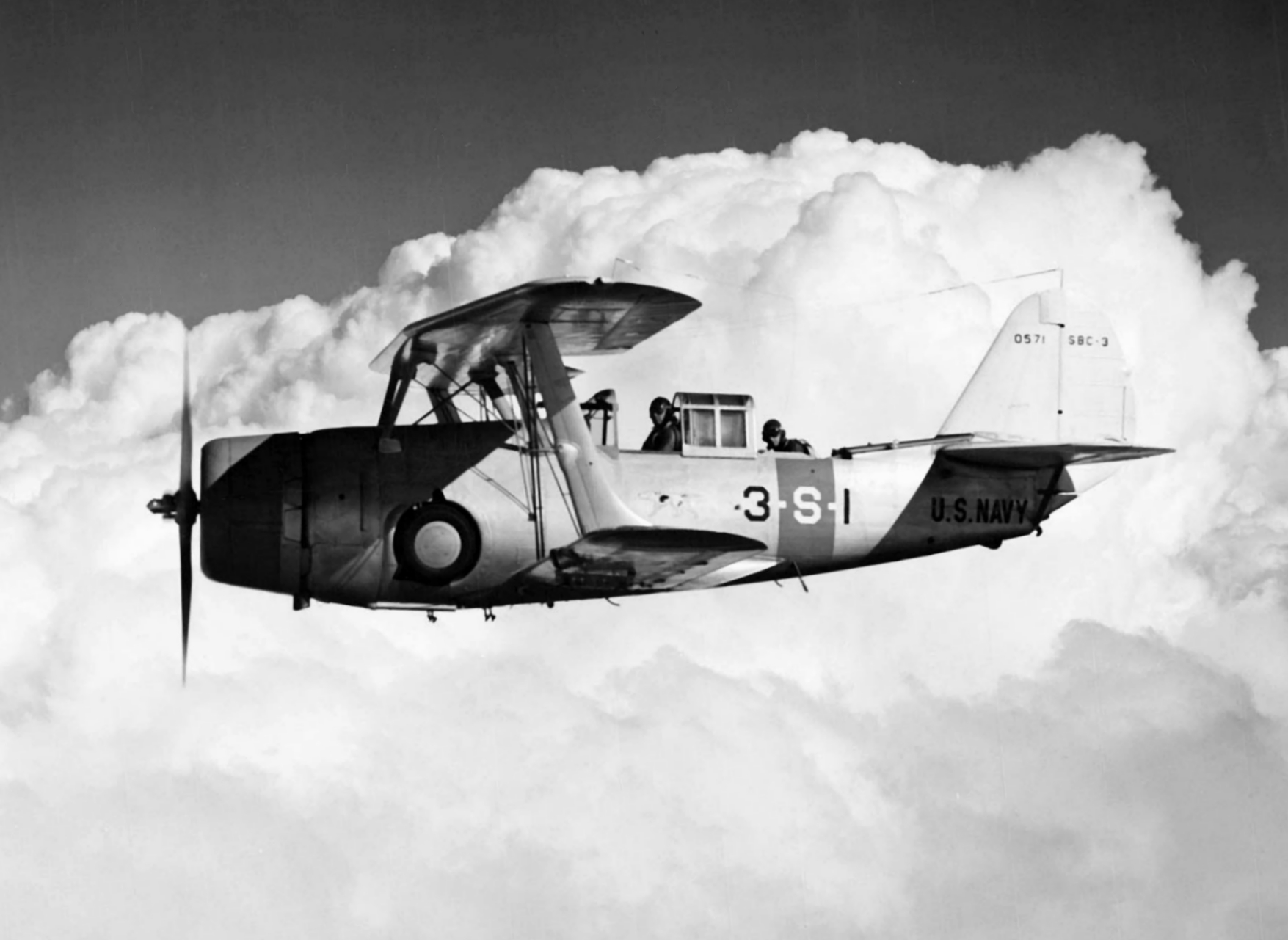
The VS-3 CO's SBC-3, assigned to USS Saratoga (CV-3), circa 1939.

The major difference between the prototype XSBC-3 and the production aircraft was the engine. A contract for 83 aircraft was signed in August 1936 and deliveries began on 17 July 1937. The production aircraft were powered by an 825 hp (615 kW) Pratt & Whitney R-1535-94 fourteen-cylinder, twin-row, air-cooled engine driving a three-blade propeller. Armament consisted of two 0.3 in (7.62 mm) machine guns, with one fixed gun in the right side of the fuselage, forward of the pilot, and a flexible gun in the rear cockpit. The aircraft had a bomb displacement swing located on the centerline of the fuselage for a 500 lb (230 kg) bomb or a 45 US gal (170 L) fuel tank.

=== XSBC-4 (Curtiss Model 77B) ===
The 76th SBC-3 was re-engined with a 950 hp (710 kW) Wright R-1820-22 nine-cylinder, single-row, air-cooled radial engine driving a three-blade Hamilton Standard propeller and redesignated XSBC-4. The aircraft armament changed to one 0.5 in (12.70 mm) fixed machine gun in the right side of the fuselage, forward of the pilot, while keeping the 0.3 in (7.62 mm) flexible machine gun in the rear cockpit. With the more powerful engine, this aircraft could carry a 1,000 lb (450 kg) bomb on the bomb displacement swing located on the centerline of the fuselage. A second SBC-3 was redesignated XSBC-4 and used for test work.

=== SBC-4 (Curtiss Model 77B) ===
The contract for 124 production aircraft of the XSBC-4 was signed on 5 January 1938 and deliveries began in March 1939 to April 1941.

== Operational history ==
=== U.S. Navy ===
In August 1936, the Navy signed a contract for 83 SBC-3s (Curtiss Model 77A). Delivery of the SBC-3s to the fleet began on 17 July 1937 when the first aircraft were issued to Scouting Squadron Five (VS-5) serving in USS Yorktown (CV-5) however, Yorktown was not commissioned until 30 September 1937 and the ship then began sea trials. On 10 December 1937, VS-5 went aboard Yorktown and served aboard her until replaced by Douglas SBD-3 Dauntlesses in 1940.

By June 1938, three of the five scouting squadrons serving in aircraft carriers were equipped with SBC-3s while the other two were equipped with Vought SBU-1s. The three ships with SBC-3s were:

- USS Enterprise (CV-6): Fighting Squadron Six (VF-6) had an SBC-3 and VS-6 had 20 Helldivers.
- USS Saratoga (CV-3): Bombing Squadron Three (VB-3) had one SBC-3, VF-3 had an SBC-3 and VS-3 had 21 Helldivers.
- USS Yorktown (CV-5): VS-5 had ten SBC-3s.

One of the SBC-3s was kept at the factory and redesignated XSBC-4 (Curtiss Model 77B). This aircraft was re-engined with the 750 hp (560 kW) Wright R-1820-22 nine cylinder, single row, air-cooled radial engine.

The initial contract for 58 SBC-4s was signed on 5 January 1938. This was followed by two additional contracts, one for 31 Helldivers on 27 July 1938 and the third contract for 35 aircraft on 13 August 1938. Total aircraft contracted for was 124. The aircraft were powered by the 850 hp (630 kW) Wright R-1820-24 engine.

The first squadron to receive the SBC-4s was VS-2 in USS Lexington (CV-2) replacing the Vought SBU-1s. By 26 June 1939, VS-2 was fully equipped with 21 aircraft. This was the only aircraft carrier that flew the SBC-4 and they were replaced by Douglas SBD-2 and -3 Dauntlesses in 1941.

Because of the expanding aviation training program, the majority of SBC-4s, and other training aircraft, were assigned to Naval Reserve Air Bases (NRABs) to allow reserve Navy and Marine airmen, assigned to reserve scouting squadrons (VS and VMS), to maintain their proficiency. By June 1940, 11 NRABs had SBC-4s as follows:

- NRAB Anacostia, District of Columbia: 3 SBC-4s assigned to VS-6R and VMS-3R,
- NRAB Boston, Massachusetts: 3 SBC-4s assigned to VS-1R, VS-2R and VMS-1R,
- NRAB Detroit, Michigan: 3 SBC-4s assigned to VS-8R and VMS-5R,
- NRAB Glenview, Illinois: .4 SBC-4s assigned to VS-9R,
- NRAB Kansas City, Kansas: 4 SBC-4s assigned to VS-12R and VMS-10R,
- NRAB Long Beach, California: 4 SBC-4s assigned to VS-13R, VS-14R and VMS-7R,
- NRAB Minneapolis, Minnesota: 3 SBC-4s assigned to VS-10R and VMS-6R,
- NRAB New York, New York: 4 SBC-4s assigned to VS-3R, VS-4R and VMS-2R,
- NRAB Oakland, California: 4 SBC-4s assigned to VS-15R and VMS-8R,
- NRAB Seattle, Washington: 4 SBC-4s assigned to VS-16R and VMS-9R,
- NRAB St. Louis, Missouri: 3 SBC-4s assigned to VS-11R

As time passed, the Navy acquired newer, more modern aircraft and the SBC-3s were replaced by the Douglas SBD Dauntless. By 7 December 1941, the U.S. Navy and Marine Corps had 69 SBC-3s and 118 SBC-4s in the inventory based at NASs, NRABs and the Naval Aircraft Factory (NAF) in Philadelphia, Pennsylvania. The largest number were at NAS Miami, Florida, where they were used for intermediate and dive bombing training.

In December 1941, the SBCs were based at:

- NAF, Philadelphia, Pennsylvania: 1 XSBC-1 and 1 SBC-3,
- NAS Corpus Christi, Texas: 34 SBC-4s,
- NAS Miami, Florida: 55 SBC-3s,
- NAS Norfolk, Virginia: 4 SBC-3s and 10 SBC-4s,
- NAS San Diego, California: 9 SBC-3s and 11 SBC-4s,
- Naval Mission, Lima, Peru: 1 SBC-4,
- USS Hornet (CV-8)
  - Bombing Squadron Eight (VB-8): 19 SBC-4s,
  - Scouting Squadron Eight (VS-8): 20 SBC-4s

Hornet was undergoing sea trials in the Atlantic on 7 December and the two squadrons kept their SBC-4s until the ship sailed to San Diego, California in March 1942. At that time, the two squadrons had transitioned to the SBD-3 Dauntless and she became the last aircraft carrier to operate the SBC.

An additional 50 SBC-4s, originally ordered by the French, were built between February and May 1941 to replace those sent overseas. The major change was replacing the 135 US gal (510 L) fuselage fuel tank with a 126 US gal (480 L) self-sealing fuel tank. The last SBC-4 was delivered in May 1941.

By 1944, the SBC-3s were no longer needed and they were stricken from the inventory. The longest to survive were 12 aircraft at NAS Jacksonville, Florida, which were stricken on 31 October 1944.

=== U.S. Marine Corps ===
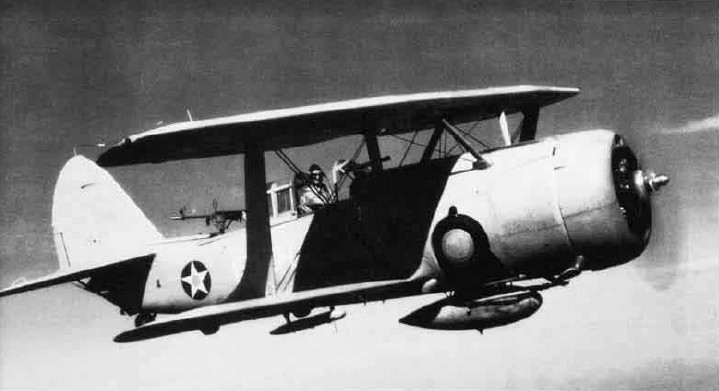
Marine Observation Squadron 151 flew the SBC-4 at Samoa until June 1943.

The U.S. Marines received one SBC-3 in 1938 and which was assigned to Marine Fighter Squadron Two (VMF-2, redesignated VMF-211 on 1 July 1941) at NAS San Diego, California. It was sent to the Battle Fleet Pool in June 1939.

In January 1940, the Marine Corps had four SBC-4s. Two were based at Marine Corps Air Station (MCAS), Quantico, Virginia; one was assigned to VMF-1 (redesignated VMF-111 on 1 July 1941) and the second, the XSBC-4, was assigned to Marine Utility Squadron One (VMJ-1 redesignated VMJ-152 on 7 July 1941). The other two aircraft were based at NAS, San Diego, California; one SBC-4 was assigned to VMF-2 and the second to VMJ-2 (redesignated VMJ-252 on 1 July 1941).

On 7 December 1941, the Marine Corps had 23 SBC-4s in their inventory. Twelve of them were assigned to a Marine observation squadron (VMO):

- MCAS Quantico, Virginia: 1 XSBC-4 and 5 SBC-4s,
- NAS San Diego, California: 5 SBC-4s, and
- VMO-151, MCAS Quantico, Virginia: 12 SBC-4s

VMO-151 transferred to Tafuna (now Pago Pago International Airport), Tutuila Island, American Samoa, on 9 May 1942 with their SBC-4s. The squadron was redesignated Marine Scout Bombing Squadron One Hundred Fifty One (VMSB-151) on 15 September 1942. A second observation squadron, VMO-155, was commissioned in American Samoa on 1 October 1942 by taking half of VMSB-151's personnel and equipment. VMO-155 received ten SBC-4s and a Grumman J2F-5 Goose however, six officers and 15 enlisted men of the squadron returned to the U.S. on 8 December 1942 as a nucleus to form a new VMO-155 and the remaining personnel were transferred to Guadalcanal Island in the Solomon Islands.

In December 1942, the VMSB-151 SBC-4s were being replaced by Douglas SBD Dauntlesses and by June 1943, the squadron had been fully equipped with SBD-4s and moved to Uvea Island in the Wallis Group, leaving their SBC-4s behind.

The last SBC reported in Marine squadron service was an SBC-4 at American Samoa in service with VMSB-151 on 1 June 1943.

=== French Navy ===
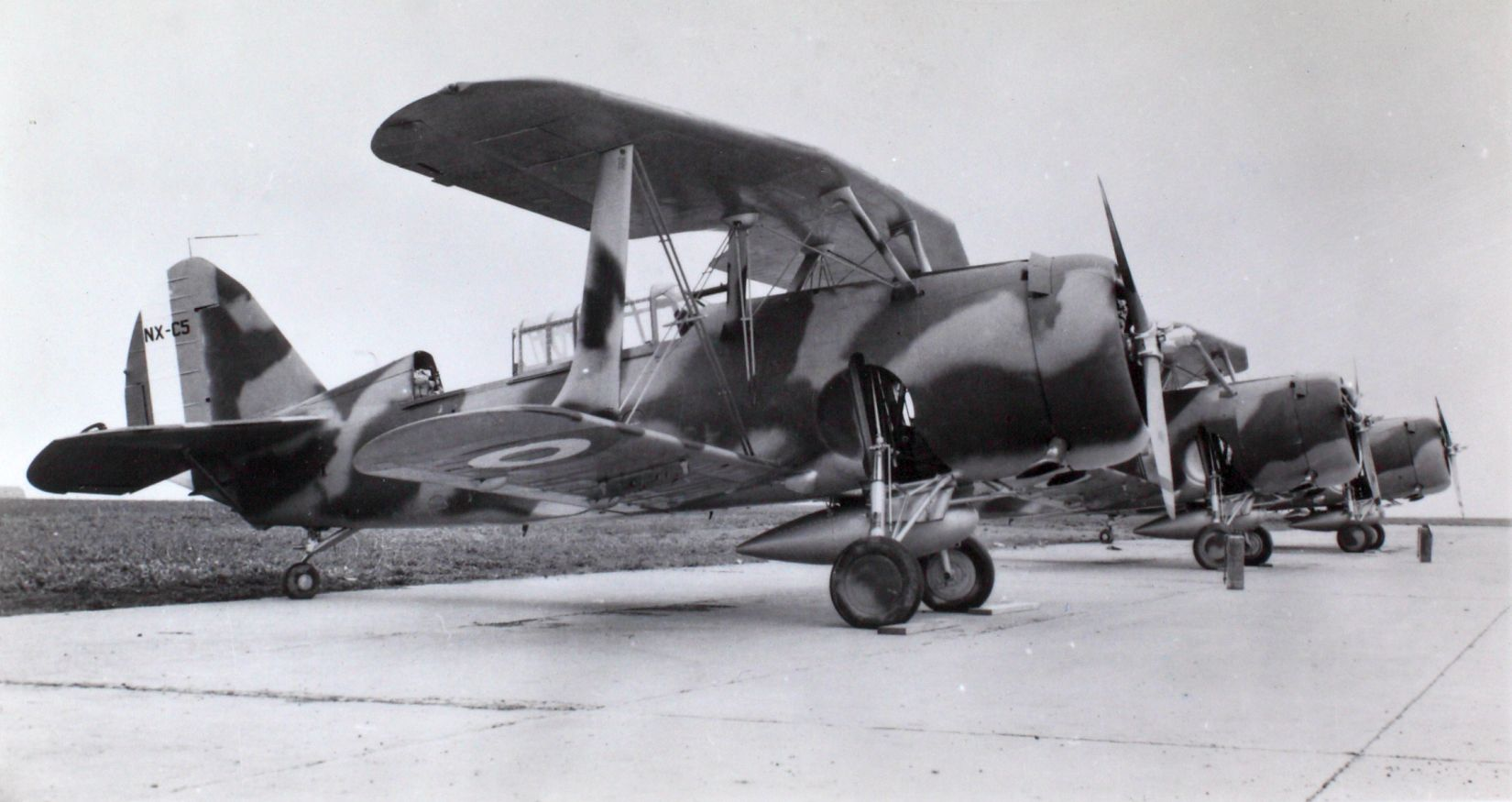
Three French SBC-4s on the ramp.

When World War II began in 1939, Britain and France came to the U.S. shopping for military aircraft. In early 1940, the French government placed an order with Curtiss-Wright for 90 SBC-4s. To aid the French, on 6 June 1940, the Roosevelt administration ordered the U.S. Navy to fly 50 SBC-4s of the Naval Reserve, currently in use by the Navy, to the Curtiss-Wright factory in Buffalo, New York, where the 50 planes would be refurbished to French standards. This included removing all U.S. markings on instruments and equipment, replacing the American machine guns with French 7.7 mm (0.303 in) Darne machine guns and repainting the aircraft in French camouflage colors. Once converted, the aircraft were to be delivered to RCAF Station Dartmouth, Nova Scotia, Canada, where they would be loaded onto the French aircraft carrier Béarn.

Several neutrality acts had been passed by the U.S. Congress and signed into law and the Neutrality Act of 1939 allowed for arms trade with belligerent nations (Great Britain and France) on a "cash-and-carry" basis. "Cash and carry" allowed the sale of materiel to belligerents, as long as the recipients arranged for the transport using their own ships or planes and paid immediately in cash. Because of this provision, the U.S. could not fly military aircraft into Canada; they had to land in the U.S. and be towed across the Canada–US border. The 50 aircraft were to fly from Buffalo, New York to Houlton Airport, Maine via Burlington, Vermont and Augusta, Maine. Houlton Airport, Maine, was on the Canada–US border and local farmers used their tractors to tow the planes into New Brunswick, Canada, where the Canadians closed the Woodstock highway so that aircraft could use it as a runway and fly to RCAF Station Dartmouth.

The 50 SBC-4s were to fly to RCAF Station Dartmouth in groups of three. One of the first groups that left encountered rain and fog while flying between Buffalo and Albany, New York, and one of the aircraft crashed. The remaining 49 aircraft were successfully flown to Nova Scotia to be loaded onto Béarn and the light cruiser Jeanne d'Arc. Because of space limitations, only 44 of the SBC-4s could be carried on FR Béarn; she also had 25 Stinson Model HW-75s (also known as Stinson 105s), 17 Curtiss H75-A1s (U.S. Army Air Corps P-36) and six Brewster F2A-2 Buffalos for the Belgian Air Force. The Jeanne d'Arc carried 14 crated, unassembled aircraft: eight Stinson Model HW-75s and six Curtiss H75-A1s.

The two ships sailed from Halifax on 16 June 1940 bound for Brest, France. Two days later, Brest fell into German hands and both ships were ordered to Fort-de-France, Martinique, French West Indies, an island in the Lesser Antilles, in the eastern Caribbean Sea. They arrived on 27 June, five days after France surrendered to the Germans. The SBC-4s were unloaded and rolled to a field at the Pointe des Sables region and stored in the open. Under tropical climatic conditions, the aircraft stored in the open were slowly rotting and were no longer airworthy and were eventually scrapped.

=== Royal Air Force ===
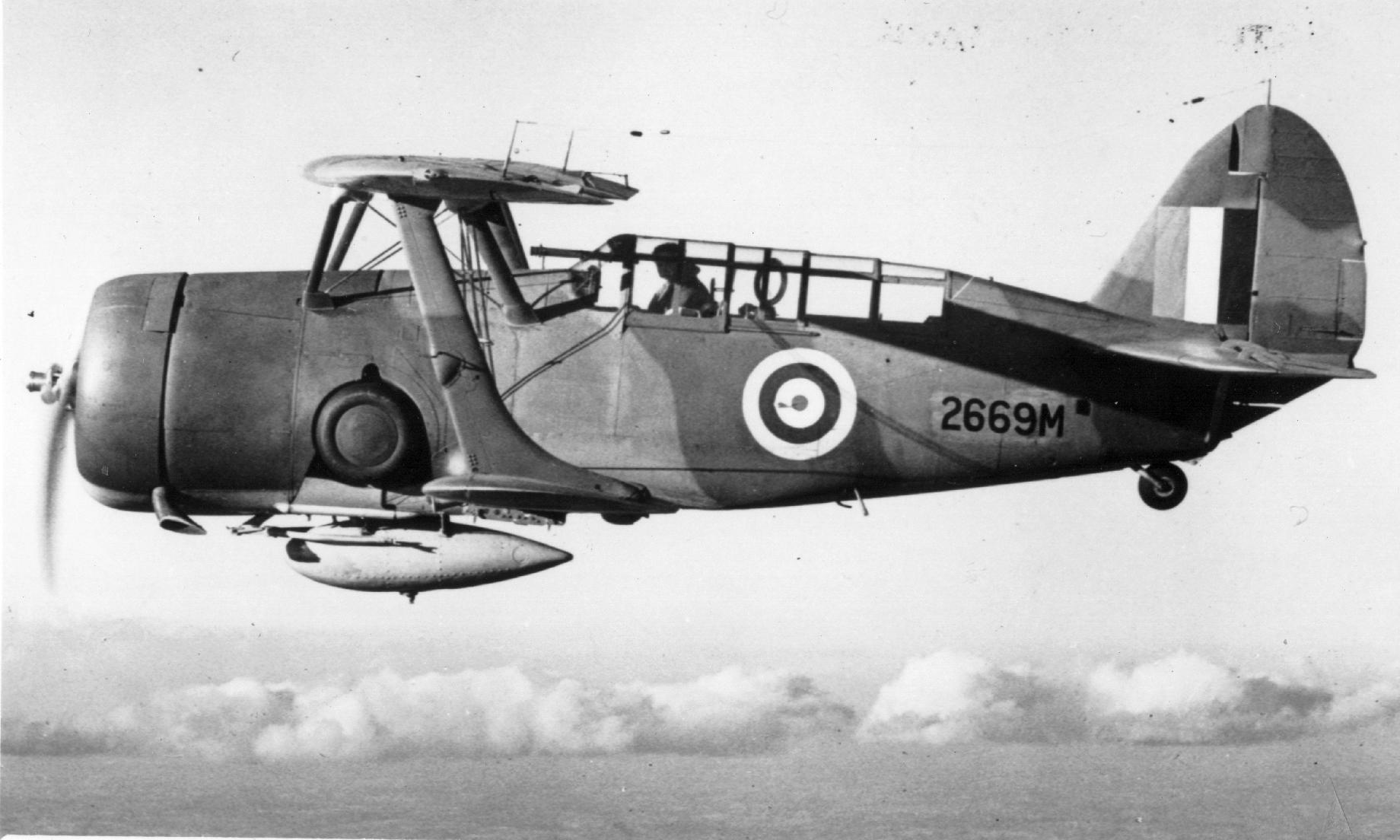
A Cleveland I in flight

Five of the French aircraft could not fit on FR Béarn and were left at RCAF Station Dartmouth. In August 1940, the Royal Air Force acquired them, designated them "Cleveland Mk. Is" and shipped them to England in the aircraft carrier HMS Furious. They were assembled at RAF Burtonwood, Lancashire, and delivered to RAF Little Rissington, Gloucestershire and later used by No. 24 (Communications) Squadron at RAF Hendon, Middlesex. These aircraft were never used operationally and became ground trainers.

== Variants ==
XF12C-1
Prototype parasol-wing fighter powered by a 625 hp (466 kW) R-1510-92 radial engine; one built, later converted into biplane as the XS4C-1.
XS4C-1
Prototype was redesignated in the "scout" category before being redesignated again as the XSBC-1.
XSBC-1
Prototype redesignated from XS4C-1, a biplane with an R-1820-80 engine.
XSBC-2
Redesigned biplane based on XSBC-1 and powered by a 700 hp (520 kW) XR-1510-12 engine; one built.
XSBC-3
XSBC-2 re-engined with a 750 hp (560 kW) R-1535-82 engine.
SBC-3
Production variant with an 825 hp (615 kW) R-1535-94 engine; 83 built.
XSBC-4
SBC-3 re-engined with a 950 hp (710 kW) R-1820-22; one conversion.
SBC-4
Production variant with a 950 hp (710 kW) R-1820-34 engine; 174 built, including 50 transferred to the French Navy.
Cleveland Mk.I
British designation for five SBC-4s.

== Operators ==
France

- French Navy

United Kingdom

- Royal Air Force

United States

- United States Marine Corps
- United States Navy

== Specifications (SBC-4) ==
Data from Curtiss Aircraft 1907–1947

General characteristics

- Crew: 2
- Length: 28 ft 1 9/16 in (8.574 m)
- Wingspan: 34 ft 0 in (10.36 m)
- Height: 10 ft 5 in (3.18 m)
- Wing area: 317 sq ft (29.5 m^{2})
- Airfoil: NACA 2212
- Empty weight: 4,552 lb (2,065 kg)
- Gross weight: 7,080 lb (3,211 kg)
- Powerplant: 1 × Wright R-1820-34 radial engine, 850 hp (630 kW)

Performance

- Maximum speed: 234 mph (377 km/h, 203 kn) at 15,200 ft (4,600 m)
- Cruise speed: 175 mph (282 km/h, 152 kn)
- Range: 405 mi (652 km, 352 nmi)
- Service ceiling: 24,000 ft (7,300 m)
- Rate of climb: 1,630 ft/min (8.3 m/s)

Armament

- Guns:
- 1 × 0.30 in (7.62 mm) forward-firing M1919 Browning machine gun or 1 × 0.50 in (12.7 mm) forward-firing Browning AN/M2 machine gun
- 1 × 0.30 in (7.62 mm) flexible rearward-firing machine gun
- Bombs: 1 × bomb of up to 1,000 lb (450 kg)

== See also ==
Aircraft of comparable role, configuration, and era

- Aichi D1A
- Henschel Hs 123
- Polikarpov R-5

Related lists

- List of aircraft of World War II
- List of United States Navy aircraft designations (pre-1962)
- List of aircraft of the Fleet Air Arm
