= XF3 =

XF3 may refer to:

== Aviation ==
- Bell D-188A (also designated XF3L), proposed supersonic tiltjet fighter
- Berliner-Joyce XF3J, biplane fighter
- Grumman F3F (experimental designation XF3F-1), biplane fighter
- Ishikawajima-Harima F3 (development designation XF3), turbofan jet engine
- Vought XF3U, prototype biplane fighter
- Wright XF3W Apache, racing aircraft

== Other uses ==
- (49379) 1998 XF3, minor planet
- The X Factor (British series 3), British TV series
- Radio callsign for the Caribbean islands in Mexico - see Call signs in Mexico
