= XF2 =

XF2 may refer to:

== Aircraft ==
- Brewster F2A Buffalo (experimental designations XF2A-1 and XF2A-4), monoplane fighter
- Goodyear F2G Corsair (prototype designation XF2G-1), monoplane fighter
- McDonnell F2H Banshee (experimental designations XF2H-1 and XF2D-1), subsonic jet fighter
- Mitsubishi F-2 (experimental designations XF-2A and XF-2B), supersonic jet fighter
- Ryan XF2R Dark Shark, experimental combination turbojet/turboprop aircraft
- Vought XF2U, experimental biplane fighter

== Other uses ==
- The X Factor (British series 2), British TV series
- South African type XF2 tender, steam locomotive tender
- Radio callsign for the close central islands of Mexico - see Call signs in Mexico
