= XF4 =

XF4 may refer to:

== Aircraft ==
- Douglas F4D Skyray (prototype designation XF4D-1), jet fighter-interceptor
- Grumman F4F Wildcat (experimental designations XF4F-1 to XF4F-3), monoplane fighter
- McDonnell Douglas F-4 Phantom II (experimental designation XF4H-1), jet fighter-bomber
- Vought F4U Corsair (experimental designation XF4U-1), monoplane fighter

== Other uses ==
- The X Factor (British series 4), British TV series
- Radio callsign for the Revillagigedo islands in Mexico - see Call signs in Mexico
