= Vought V-326 =

American research aircraft

General information
- Type: Experimental aircraft
- National origin: United States
- Manufacturer: Vought
- Status: Retired
- Number built: 2

History
- First flight: June 18, 1943
- Developed from: TBU Sea Wolf

The Vought V-326 (alternatively Vought-Sikorsky VS-326) was an American experimental aircraft used by Pratt & Whitney as a high altitude engine test bed.

== Design and development ==
Vought began work on the V-326 in 1941 at the request of Pratt & Whitney. Designed as a test bed for the R-4360 Wasp Major radial engine, the aircraft was based on the XTBU-1 Sea Wolf and used components from the F4U Corsair. The V-326 was a low-wing monoplane with a pressurized two-seat cockpit. Its main landing gear rotated 90 degrees and retracted rearward into the wings. In the rear fuselage was a compartment for ballast. The engine's carburetor was fed by a scoop situated ahead of the vertical stabilizer.

== Operational history ==
The V-326 made its first flight on June 18, 1943, at the hands of P&W chief test pilot A. Lewis McClain. Harold B. Archer flew most subsequent flights, with pressurization troubles keeping most flights below 40,000 feet (12,000 m).

The second aircraft, the V-326A, made its first and only flight on August 30, 1944. It subsequently underwent modifications, though they were not completed as the need for the aircraft faded. Both aircraft were scrapped in 1946, the V-326 having only 111 hours logged.

== Variants ==
V-326
First aircraft with a deep cowling enclosing the supercharger and a three-bladed propeller.

V-326A
Second aircraft with a tight cowling, intakes under the wings feeding the twin superchargers, and a four-bladed propeller.

== Specifications (V-326) ==
Data from

General characteristics

- Crew: 2
- Length: 43 ft 0 in (13.1 m)
- Wingspan: 57 ft 10 in (17.6 m)
- Height: 19 ft 4 in (5.9 m)
- Empty weight: 11,242 lb (5,099 kg)
- Gross weight: 17,176 lb (7,791 kg)
- Fuel capacity: 700 US gallons (2,600 L)
- Powerplant: 1 × Pratt & Whitney R-4360 Wasp Major 28-cylinder four-row radial piston engine
- Propellers: 3-bladed

Performance

- Maximum speed: 418 mph (673 km/h, 363 kn)

== See also ==
Related development

- Consolidated TBY Sea Wolf
- Vought F4U Corsair

Aircraft of comparable role, configuration, and era

- Folland Fo.108

Related lists

- List of experimental aircraft
