= VF-42 =

Fighting Squadron 42
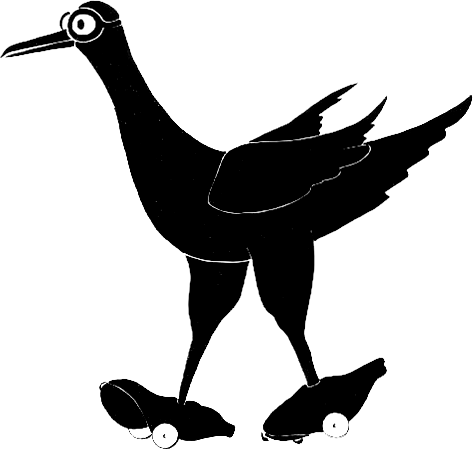
- VF-42 unit insignia
- Active: May 1928 - 22 June 1942
- Country: United States
- Branch: United States Navy
- Type: Fighter
- Engagements: World War II

Aircraft flown
- Fighter: SBU-1; F4F-3 Wildcat

Fighting Squadron 42 or VF-42 was an aviation unit of the United States Navy. Originally established as Scouting Squadron 1B (VS-1B) in May 1928, it was redesignated as VS-1S in 1930, redesignated as VS-1B in 1931, redesignated as VS-41 on 1 July 1937, redesignated as VF-42 on 15 March 1941 and disestablished on 22 June 1942. It was the first US Navy squadron to be designated as VF-42.

== Operational history ==
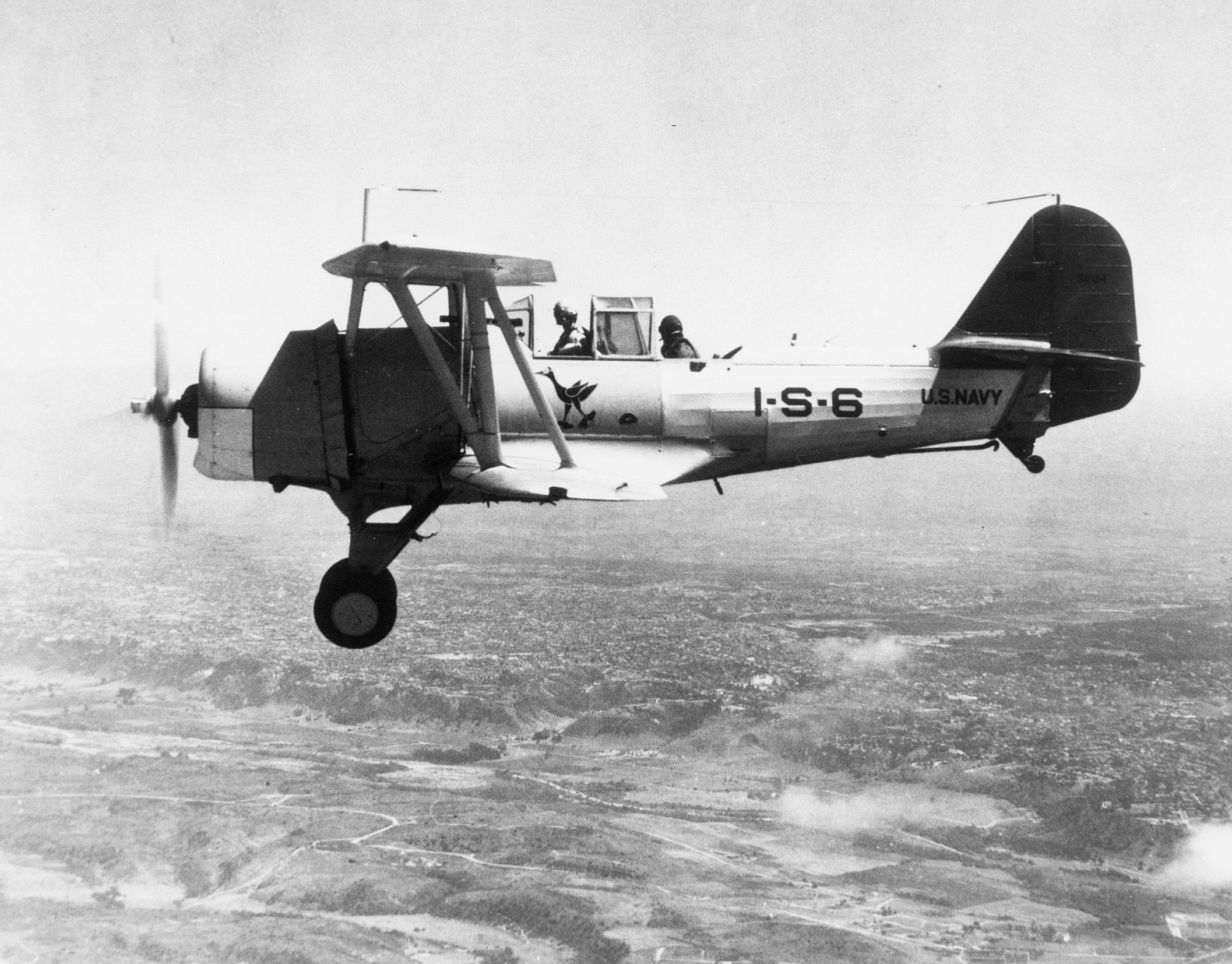
VS-1B SBU-1 in the 1930s

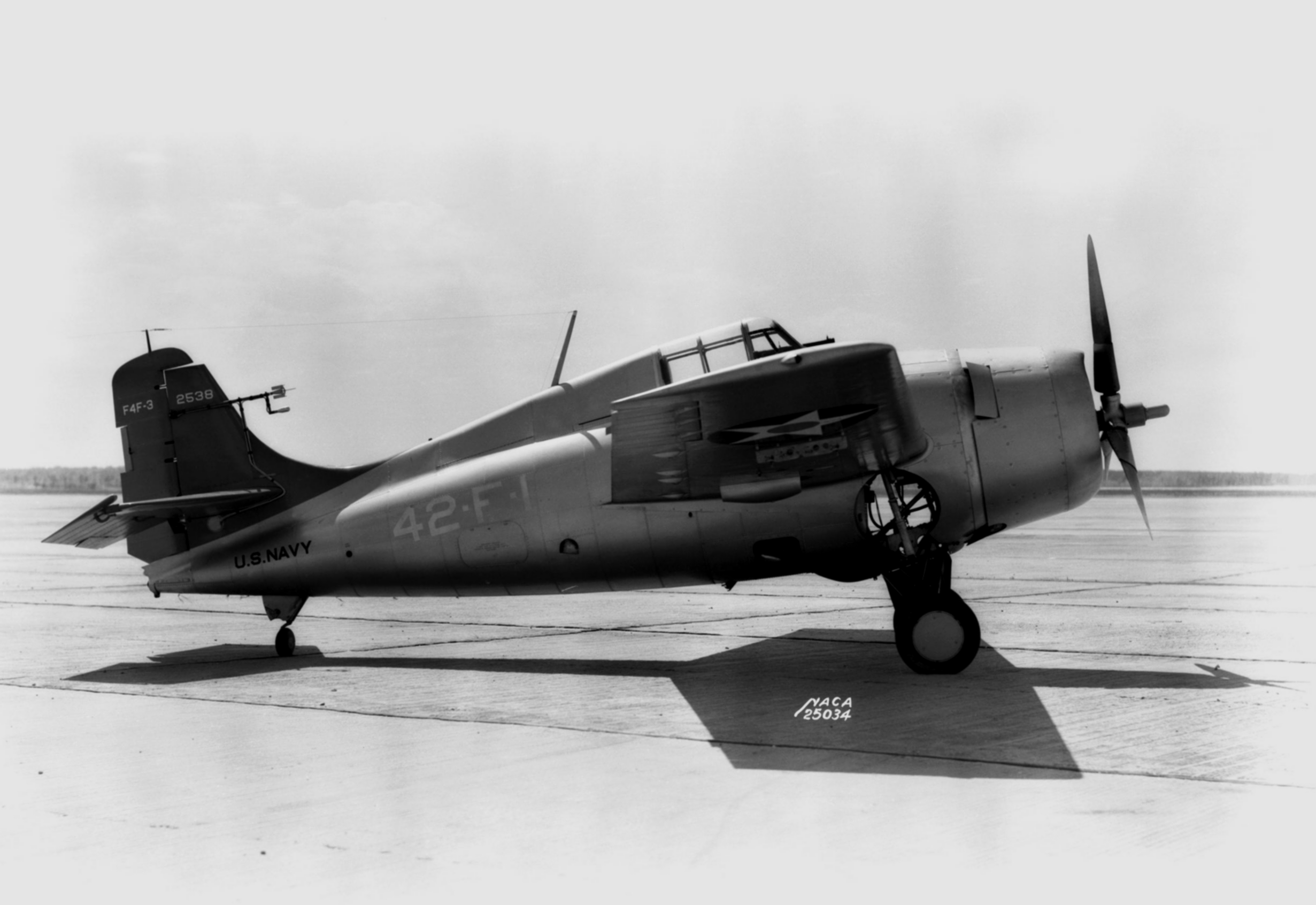
VF-42 F4F-3 at NACA Langley in 1941

VS-1B was assigned to the USS Ranger in the 1930s.

In December 1941 VF-42 was embarked on USS Yorktown for deployment to the Pacific Theatre. VF-42 shot down 25 Japanese aircraft until the squadron was disestablished following the sinking of the Yorktown on 7 June 1942 during the Battle of Midway.

== See also ==
- History of the United States Navy
- List of inactive United States Navy aircraft squadrons
- List of United States Navy aircraft squadrons
