= Douglas XFD =

Experimental two-seat naval biplane fighter

XFD
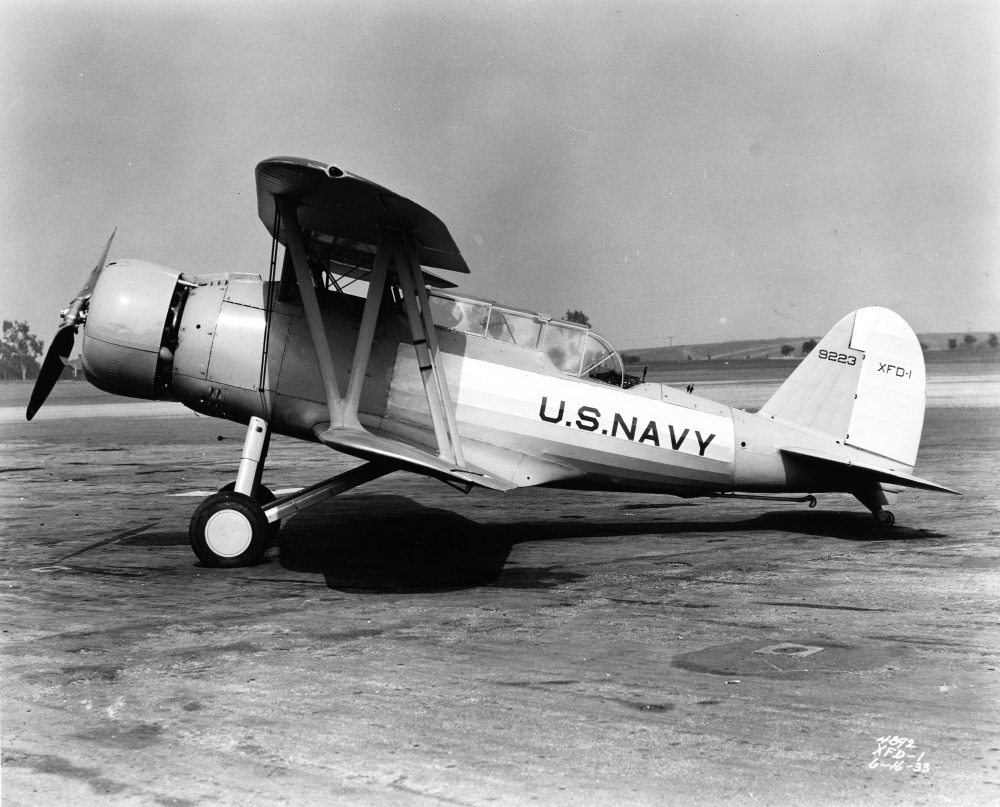

General information
- Type: Fighter
- National origin: United States
- Manufacturer: Douglas Aircraft Company
- Primary user: United States Navy
- Number built: 1

History
- First flight: January 1933

The Douglas XFD was a carrier-based biplane fighter aircraft designed for the United States Navy, and the first fighter to be built by the Douglas Aircraft Company. A victim of changing requirements, no production was undertaken.

== Design and development ==
The XFD was designed to the U.S. Navy's Bureau of Aeronautics (BuAer) Specification No. 311, requesting a carrier-based two-seater biplane fighter. On June 30, 1932, the Navy ordered the XFD, Vought XF3U, and Curtiss XF12C for testing.

The first naval fighter designed by Douglas Aircraft, the XFD was constructed of metal, with a fabric outer covering. The crew sat in tandem in a single bay, enclosed by a long canopy. The aircraft had fixed conventional landing gear, and was designed to be armed with two .30 in (7.6 mm) machine guns, one fixed in the cowling and the other on a flexible mount for the observer. A 500-pound (230 kg) bomb load could be carried. Powered was supplied by a Pratt & Whitney R-1535 Twin Wasp Junior radial engine.

== Operational history ==
The XFD-1 (Note: The XFD-1 designation was later reused by the U.S. Navy for the prototype of the McDonnell FH Phantom jet fighter.) prototype first flew in January 1933; it was delivered to the U.S. Navy for trials at Naval Air Station Anacostia in June 1933, within four days of the delivery of the Vought XF3U-1; evaluations of the types were undertaken between June 18, 1933 and August 14, 1934. While the XFD-1's performance was considered to be acceptable, the U.S. Navy's operational requirements were already changing to see the two-seat fighter concept falling out of favor, the scout bomber being considered more useful for the Navy's needs, and accordingly after the end of the XFD-1's flight trials no further orders were placed for the type.

== Specifications ==
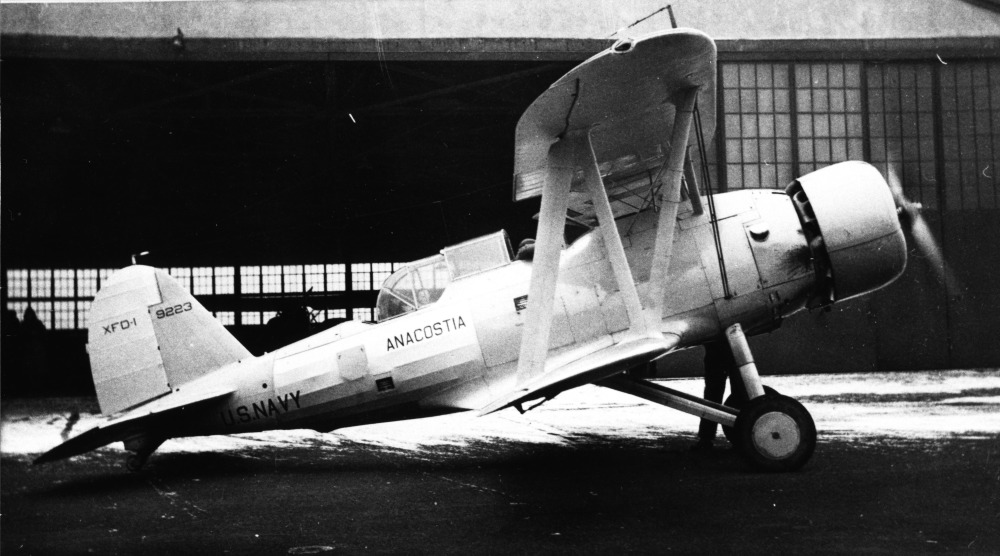
The XFD-1 in June 1933

Data from Angelucci 1987, Johnson 2011

General characteristics

- Crew: Two (pilot and observer)
- Length: 25 ft 4 in (7.72 m)
- Wingspan: 31 ft 6 in (9.60 m)
- Height: 25 ft 4 in (7.72 m)
- Wing area: 295 sq ft (27.4 m^{2})
- Empty weight: 3,227 lb (1,464 kg)
- Gross weight: 5,000 lb (2,268 kg)
- Powerplant: 1 × Pratt & Whitney R-1535-64 14-cylinder air-cooled radial engine, 700 hp (520 kW)
- Propellers: 2-bladed Hamilton Standard

Performance

- Maximum speed: 204 mph (328 km/h, 177 kn)
- Cruise speed: 170 mph (270 km/h, 150 kn)
- Combat range: 576 mi (927 km, 501 nmi)
- Service ceiling: 23,700 ft (7,200 m)
- Rate of climb: 1,670 ft/min (8.5 m/s)

Armament

- Guns: 1 x .30-caliber machine gun, fixed forwards-firing cowl mounting
  1 x .30-caliber machine gun, flexible mounting in rear cockpit
- Bombs: 500 pounds (230 kg) external

== See also ==
Aircraft of comparable role, configuration, and era

- Curtiss XF12C
- Vought XF3U

Related lists

- List of United States Navy aircraft designations (pre-1962)
