= Triumph Group =

American aerospace components manufacturer

Triumph Group, Inc.
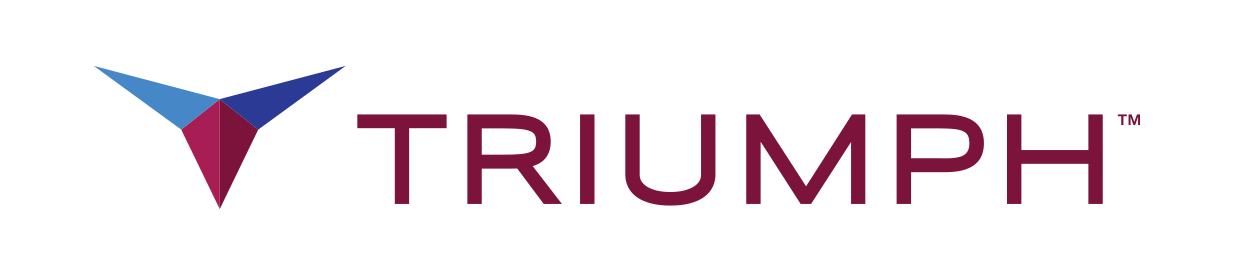
- Type: Private
- Traded as: NYSE: TGI
- Industry: Manufacturing; Aerospace
- Predecessor: Alco Standard
- Founded: 1993; 33 years ago
- Headquarters: Radnor, Pennsylvania
- Number of locations: 64
- Key people: Jorge L. Valladares III (President and CEO); Jim McCabe (CFO)
- Products: Aerospace components
- Services: Aerospace repair and overhaul
- Revenue: ▲US$1.19 billion (2024)
- Operating income: ▼US$86.4 million (2024)
- Net income: ▲US$512 million (2024)
- Total assets: ▼US$1.69 billion (2024)
- Total equity: ▲US$−104 million (2024)
- Owner: Warburg Pincus and Berkshire Partners
- Number of employees: 4,530 (2024)
- Website: triumphgroup.com

Triumph Group, Inc. is an American supplier of aerospace services, structures, systems and support. Based in Radnor, Pennsylvania, Triumph engineers, designs, and manufactures aircraft components, systems, and accessories. Several services and products are offered through three of their operating organizations, Integrated Systems, Aerospace Structures, and Product Support.

Triumph Group serves original equipment manufacturers of regional, commercial, military and business aircraft and components, as well as air cargo carriers and regional and commercial airlines.

== History ==
=== 1980s ===
Triumph Group was formerly one of the companies in Alco Standard Corporation, a loose conglomerate of diversified companies that operated across a large number of unrelated fields, including office supplies. By the latter half of the decade, officers of Alco Standard Corporation were concentrating on office supplies, paper products, and food services, their three core competencies. The former was the fastest-growing market for the company.

In 1986, Alco was considering selling Triumph Group and its distribution businesses, the former of which competed in the aerospace industry and earned just under 3% of Alco Standard's revenue.

=== 1990s ===
In addition to its aerospace factions, Triumph also had a stake in the U.S. steel industry. Because customers were becoming more demanding with respect to product quality, Alco Standard formed a new organization named Alco Diversified Services out of the 11 companies that comprised the Triumph Group, the two paper companies and their aerospace subsidiary. Richard Ill, who led Triumph Group for several years, was promoted to president of Alco Diversified Services.

In 1991, Alco sold their food division. In 1992, the corporation made an announcement that it was trying to sell Alco Diversified Services and purchase 49.9% percent of IMM Office Systems Holding. In 1993, Triumph Group took over Alco Diversified Services in a leveraged buyout. Triumph conducted aviation repair and overhaul, industrial machining, paper converting and steel converting. The companies employed 1450 people at 22 US locations, with aviation accounting for just over 25% of total sales.

In 1995, due to Department of Defense cutbacks, Triumph sold Otto Konigslow Manufacturing Company (which manufactured aerospace components) to two of its supervisors.

In the middle of the 1990s, commercial aviation sales went from $200 million to $300 million in three years, with forecasts indicating that sales would reach $500 million before the end of the decade. The aviation businesses provided 67% of the company's revenue. With never-before-seen demand for airline travel around 1996, Boeing produced close to 500 aircraft per annum. To meet this unprecedented production rate, Boeing outsourced a greater number of components and services.

In 1996, the corporation had 1500 workers and yearly earnings of $300 million. Six divisions worked in aviation while the other seven worked in specialty materials. The company went public at that time, which provided over $50 million in revenue.

The company focused on purchasing aviation companies in an attempt to increase profits by 20% per annum, and extend their product lines. Such acquisitions included Air Lab (1995), Teleflex Controls (1996), Hydro-Mill Company (1997), DV Industries (1998), DG Industries (1998), Chase Aerospace Limited (1998) and Hartford Tool and Die (1998).

In 1998, when Ill subsequently announced his preoccupations about cutbacks in aircraft production at Boeing Company, he also stated that there may be more work forthcoming on the new Boeing 737. This was an excellent fit for Triumph Air Repair, as much of their work consisted of servicing the Boeing 727 and 737 aircraft. It was at this time that Boeing Company purchased McDonnell Douglas, the first company to manufacture the KC-10 aircraft, which was the aerial refueling version of the Boeing DC-10. Soon to follow would be Triumph Air Repair's largest contract ever, a twelve-month deal to service auxiliary power units and line replaceable units for the United States Air Force KC-10 tankers. Boeing had several options to renew, increasing the potential of this arrangement ninefold.

In 1998, Triumph acquired four additional companies, bringing its grand total of subsidiaries to eighteen and its employee count to over two thousand in early 1999. It was at this time that Triumph purchased Ralee Engineering, a manufacturer of gigantic aircraft components and assemblies. This gave the conglomerate the ability to produce almost all of the parts used in commercial aircraft.

In 1999, Triumph infused six more companies into its lineup of subsidiaries. The company produced flight control surfaces, control systems, and metal parts while providing MRO for almost every aircraft system except cabins, communications devices, landing gear, engines and the most comprehensive maintenance checks.

=== 2000s ===
In 2003, the Boeing Company's failing Spokane, Washington facility was acquired, which is now known as Triumph Composite Systems. The conglomerate now stood at 41 companies. In the same quarter of that year, the company restructured by discontinuing its Metals Group and combining its five aviation segments into three. The Control Systems and Structures Groups were combined into Triumph Aerospace Systems Group. The Gas Turbine Services and Operational Components Groups were unified, becoming Triumph Components Group. Triumph Aftermarket Services Group added Advanced Materials Technologies and Aerospace Technologies to its portfolio.

Shortly thereafter, Triumph acquired the Parker Hannifin Corporation United Aircraft Products Division and Rolls-Royce Gear Systems. The company then reorganized into two groups, Triumph Aftermarket Services and Triumph Aerospace Systems. It also combined several of its Arizona subsidiaries into Triumph Engineered Solutions; operations at the Phoenix Manufacturing Division of Triumph Engineered Solutions ceased on December 31, 2004, and its Wisconsin Manufacturing Division was sold.

In 2009, Triumph Group purchased Mexmil Company, Kongsberg Automotive, Merritt Tool Company and Saygrove Defense & Aerospace Group.

=== 2010s ===
Company logo from 2010

In June 2010, Triumph Group acquired Vought Aircraft Industries, a leading producer of aerostructures from the Carlyle Group. This acquisition close to doubled the company workforce, and created a 'Tier One Capable' supplier.

In October 2013 Triumph Group Inc. completed its acquisition of General Donlee Canada Inc., a manufacturer of complex machined components such as gear sets and transmissions.

In January 2014 the company sold its division Lee Aerospace back to its original founder, Jim Lee. Triumph had owned Lee Aerospace for 14 years.

In December 2015, Triumph Group Inc. announced that Daniel J. Crowley would be named president and chief executive officer effective 4 January 2016. Crowley succeeds Richard C. Ill, CEO from 1993 to 2012. Ill left retirement to step in after Jeffry D. Frisby resigned. Ill was also the chairman since 2009, so when he took over the CEO position after Frisby left, he was succeeded by one of the company's board members, U.S. Air Force (Ret.) Gen. Ralph E. Eberhart.

=== 2020s ===
In 2020 Triumph Group's fourth quarter had an operating loss of $40.3 million, this was inclusive of a $66.1 million 'goodwill Product Support' due to the effects of the COVID-19 crisis on the overall aviation market.

In 2021 Triumph Group signed a Ten Year Contract With Rolls-Royce.

In May 2023, activist hedge fund Vision One negotiated a cooperation agreement with the Company, resulting in Vision One principals Courtney Mather and Julio C. Acero joining Triumph’s Board.

In June 2023 Triumph Group announced that it had entered into a Memorandum of Understanding (MOU) with Stirling Dynamics with the aim to collaborate on advancing opportunities in the electro-mechanical actuation market.

In December 2023, Triumph announced the sale of its Product Support business to AAR Corporation for $725 million.

In February 2025, private equity firms Warburg Pincus and Berkshire Partners agreed to take Triumph Group private for approximately $3 billion, or $26 per share. This acquisition was completed in July 2025.

== Business units ==
Triumph Group has three business units:

- Triumph Actuation Products & Services
- Triumph Geared Solutions
- Triumph Interiors
- Triumph Systems Electronics & Controls

Triumph Actuation Products & Services provides design, manufacturing and MRO services for products and systems that include hydraulic pumps and motors, actuators, fuses, accumulators, valves and manifolds, and carrier launched aircraft holdback bars. APS also provides design, manufacturing, and support solutions for highly engineered mechanical and electromechanical controls and components. APS maintains capability for systems engineering and integration, as well as hydromechanical and electronics in-house development. APS serves as the integration focal for TRIUMPH, specializing in motion, control and power systems for commercial, military and rotorcraft aircraft.

Triumph Geared Solutions is the independent supplier for the design and manufacture of commercial & defense aerospace gearing components and integrated gearboxes for fixed wing, rotorcraft, aircraft engine and ground vehicle applications. Additionally, GS provides aftermarket spares and repair/overhaul support for these parts. GS collaborates with customers to provide capabilities including design, engineering and manufacturing of complex mechanical assemblies and build-to-print for highly specialized applications.

Triumph Interiors specializes in thermo-acoustic insulation systems, air distribution ducting systems, floor systems, thermoplastic interior assemblies with facilities located around the globe.

Triumph Systems Electronics & Controls specializes in design, development, certification, manufacture and repair of fuel pumps, fuel metering units, fuel controls and electronic engine control systems for helicopters and fixed-wing aircraft servicing military, commercial, regional and business jet market sectors.
