= Consolidated TBY Sea Wolf =

US Navy WW2 torpedo bomber

TBY Sea Wolf
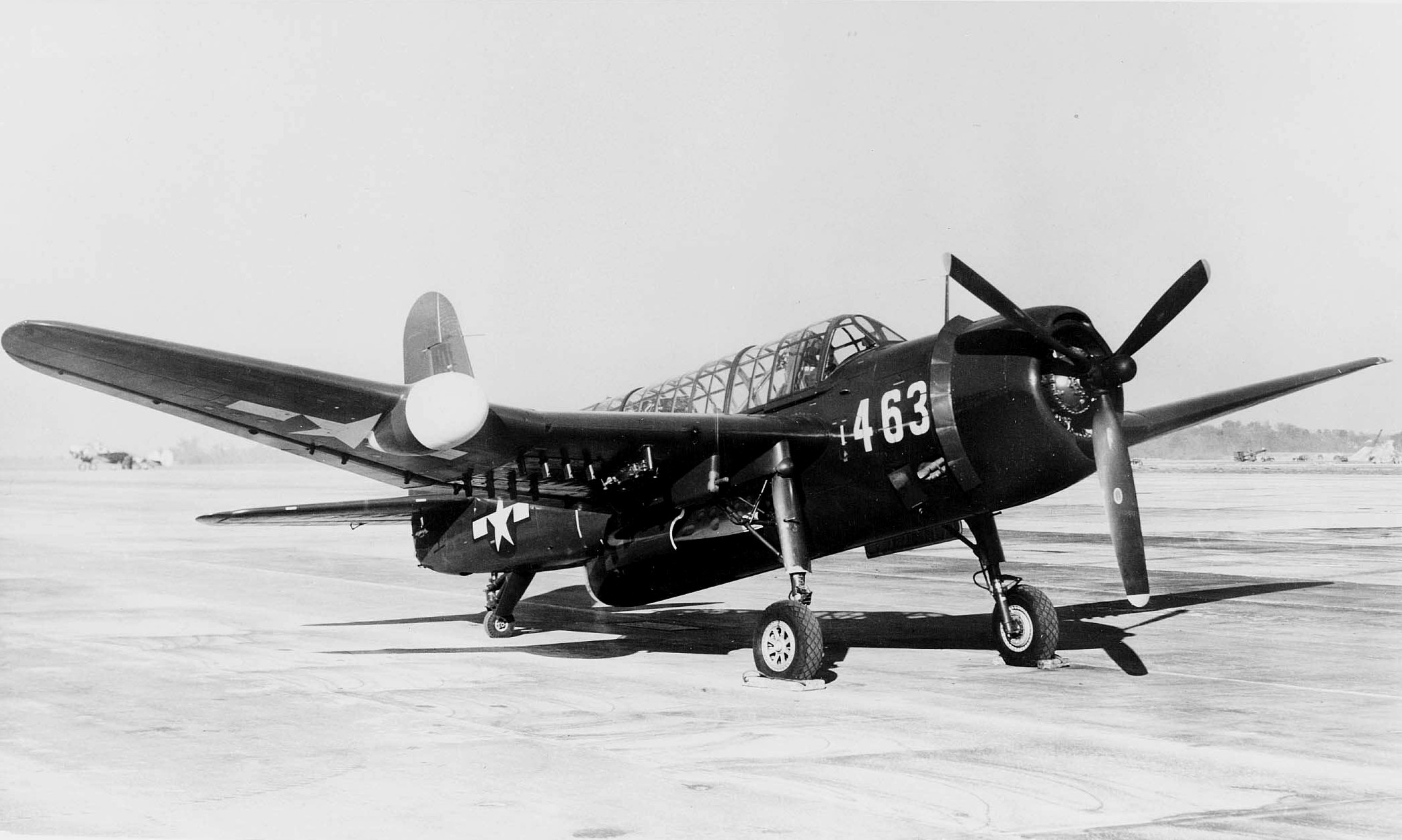
- A production TBY-2

General information
- Type: Torpedo bomber
- National origin: United States
- Manufacturer: Consolidated Aircraft
- Designer: Vought
- Status: Retired
- Primary user: United States Navy
- Number built: 180 + 1 prototype

History
- Introduction date: 1944
- First flight: 22 December 1941
- Variant: Vought V-326

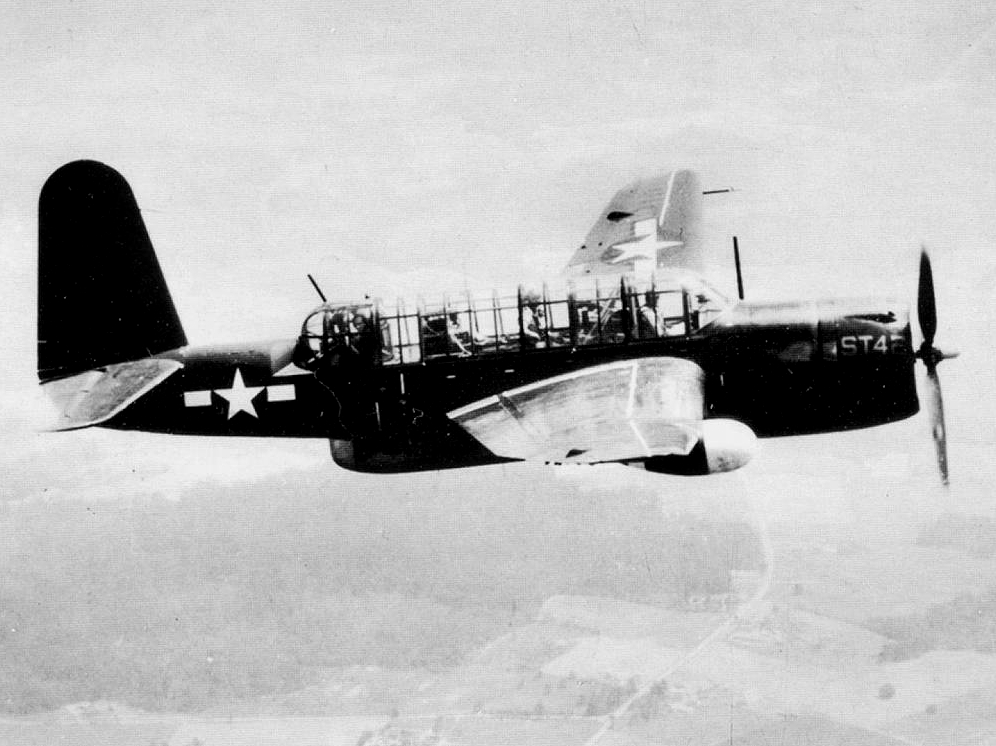
TBY-2 Sea Wolf in flight

The Consolidated TBY Sea Wolf was a torpedo bomber designed by Vought and was manufactured by Consolidated Aircraft. It was flown by the United States Navy (USN).

It was designed during the late 1930s and early 1940s as the XTBU-1 Sea Wolf by Vought to replace the aging TBD Devastator in competition with the Grumman TBF Avenger. However, development was impacted by substantial delays and, although an active programme during World War II, it never flew combat missions in the conflict. Although the prototype made its maiden flight in December 1941 as the XTBU-1, Vought was preoccupied with large-scale production of the F4U, and did not have the factory space. Accordingly, production was transferred to rival firm Consolidated-Vultee at a new factory; this decision delayed both production and service entry of the Sea Wolf.

Common to many other aircraft of this era, the Sea Wolf was subject to sweeping cancellations due to surplus and interest in new designs after the conflict led to the Sea Wolf being bypassed in favor of other aircraft. In particular, many navies were focusing on single-seat attack aircraft, such as the Martin AM Mauler or Blackburn Firebrand, or newer designs harnessing jet propulsion. According, while a substantial order for 1,100 aircraft had been received from the USN, only 180 TBY-2s were completed prior to this order being cancelled shortly after the Surrender of Japan. A separate order for 600 TBY-3s was also terminated around this time. The first production aircraft were delivered in late 1944 and reserve units were training on the type by the end of the conflict. The Sea Wolf was in service for only few years with a reserve unit before the type was withdrawn in the late 1940s.

== Design and development ==
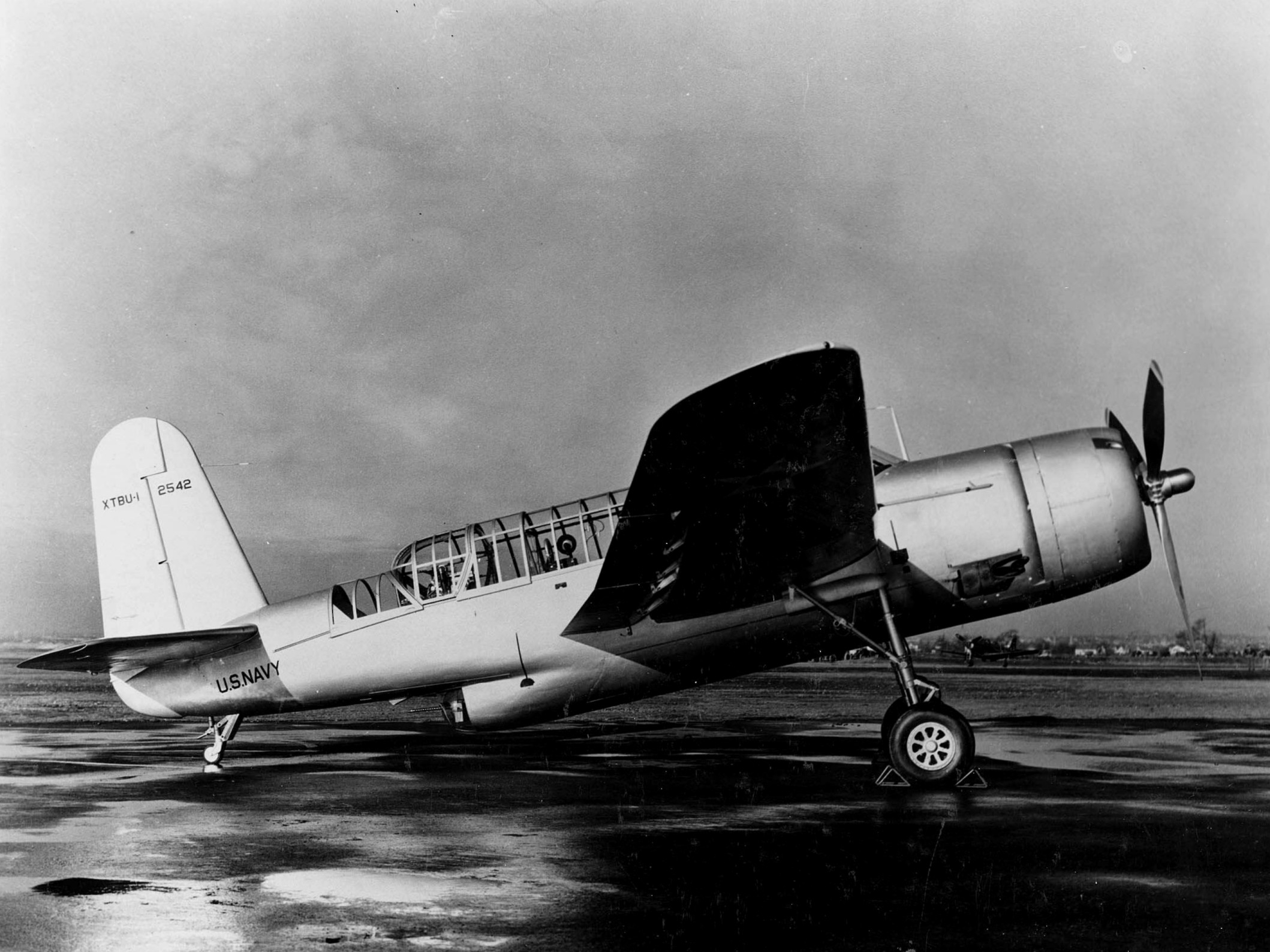
The Vought XTBU-1 prototype in December 1941

The original design was not by Consolidated Aircraft but rather by Vought, who designed the then XTBU-1 Sea Wolf to meet a 1939 US Navy requirement. The first prototype flew two weeks after Pearl Harbor was attacked. Its performance was deemed superior to that of the Avenger, and the Navy placed an order for 1,000 examples.

Several unfortunate incidents intervened; the prototype was damaged in a rough arrested landing trial and, when repaired a month later, was again damaged in a collision with a training aircraft. Once repaired again, the prototype was accepted by the Navy. However, by this time, Vought was heavily overcommitted to other contracts, especially for the F4U Corsair fighter, and had no production capacity. It was arranged that Consolidated-Vultee would produce the aircraft (as the TBY), but this had to wait until the new production facility in Allentown, Pennsylvania, was complete, which took until late 1943.

The design was also used as the basis for the Vought V-326 testbed and research aircraft in the 1940s.

== Operational history ==
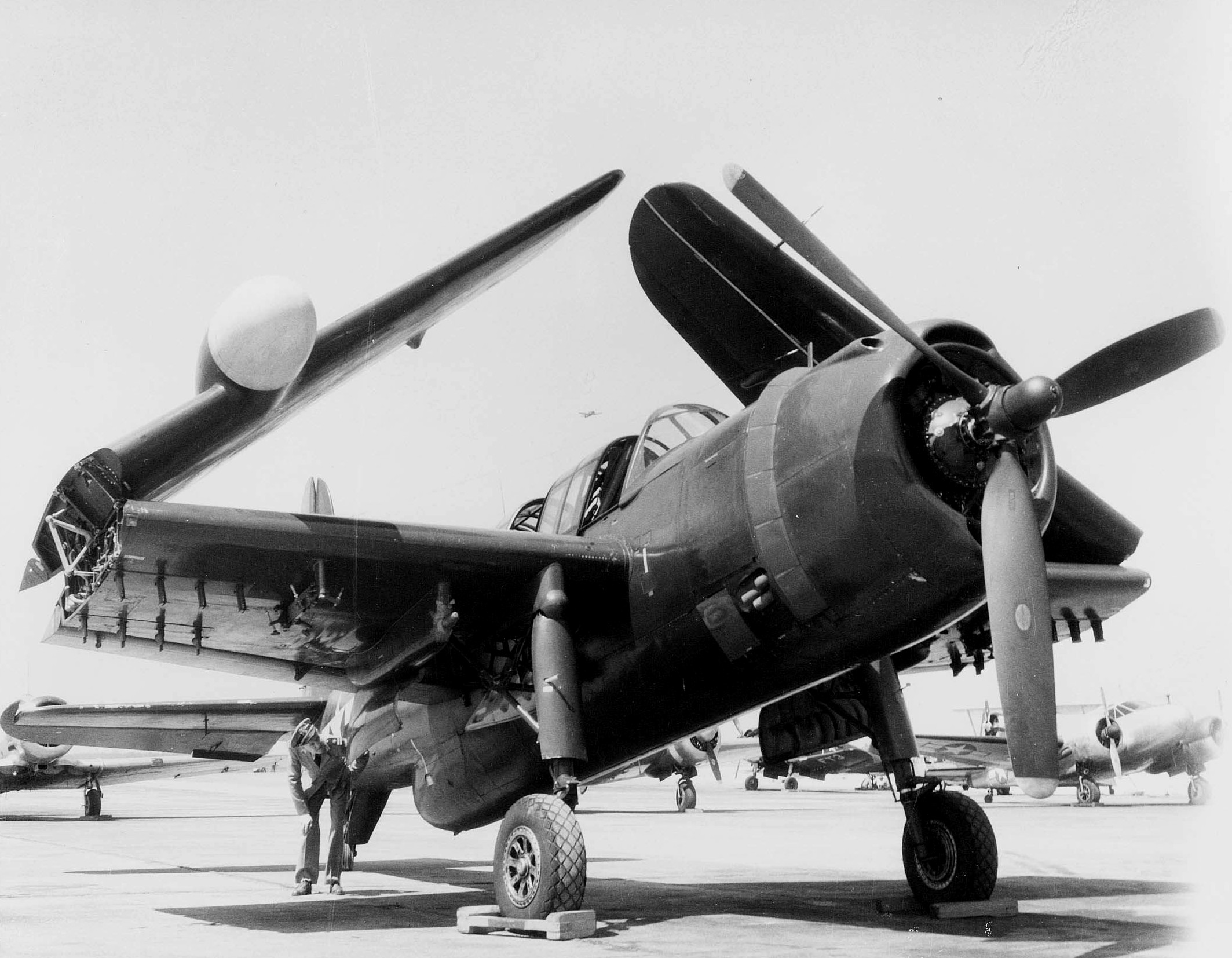
A TBY-2 with its wings folded, which is a feature for carrier-borne aircraft to save deck space

The production TBYs were radar-equipped, with a radome under the right-hand wing. The first newer aircraft flew on 20 August 1944. By this time the Avenger equipped every torpedo squadron in the Navy, and there was no need for the Sea Wolf; in addition, numerous small problems delayed entry into service. Orders were canceled after production started, and the 180 built were used for training.

The TBY-2 was delivered to the Navy on 7 November 1944 and equipped VT-97 by April 1945. The Navy canceled the rest of the order in September 1945 after VJ day and put its efforts into fielding the radar equipped Avenger. The end of the war also halted the development of the TBY-3. They were held in reserve in the late 1940s before finally being withdrawn.

In July 1945, one aircraft was damaged due to a collapsed landing gear, operating from NAS Patuxent River. Also, in July 1945, one airframe was lost when it crashed when it overshot the runway at Convair field. In January 1946, another landing incident damaged a Sea Wolf at NAS Norfolk while another was damaged in a ground looping accident in April 1946 at NAS Anacostia. There were other small incidents in the late 1940s while they were in service.

== Variants ==
XTBU-1

XTBU-1 Sea Wolf
Prototype three-seat torpedo bomber powered by a R-2800-22 engine, one built.
TBY-1 Sea Wolf
Production variant of the XTBU-1, not built.
TBY-2 Sea Wolf
TBY-1 with an additional radar pod mounted under starboard-wing, 180 built, a further 920 were canceled. (180 of 1100 produced before further production canceled in September 1945)
TBY-3 Sea Wolf
Improved variant, order for 600 canceled, not built. (canceled in September 1945)

== Specifications (TBY-2 Sea Wolf) ==
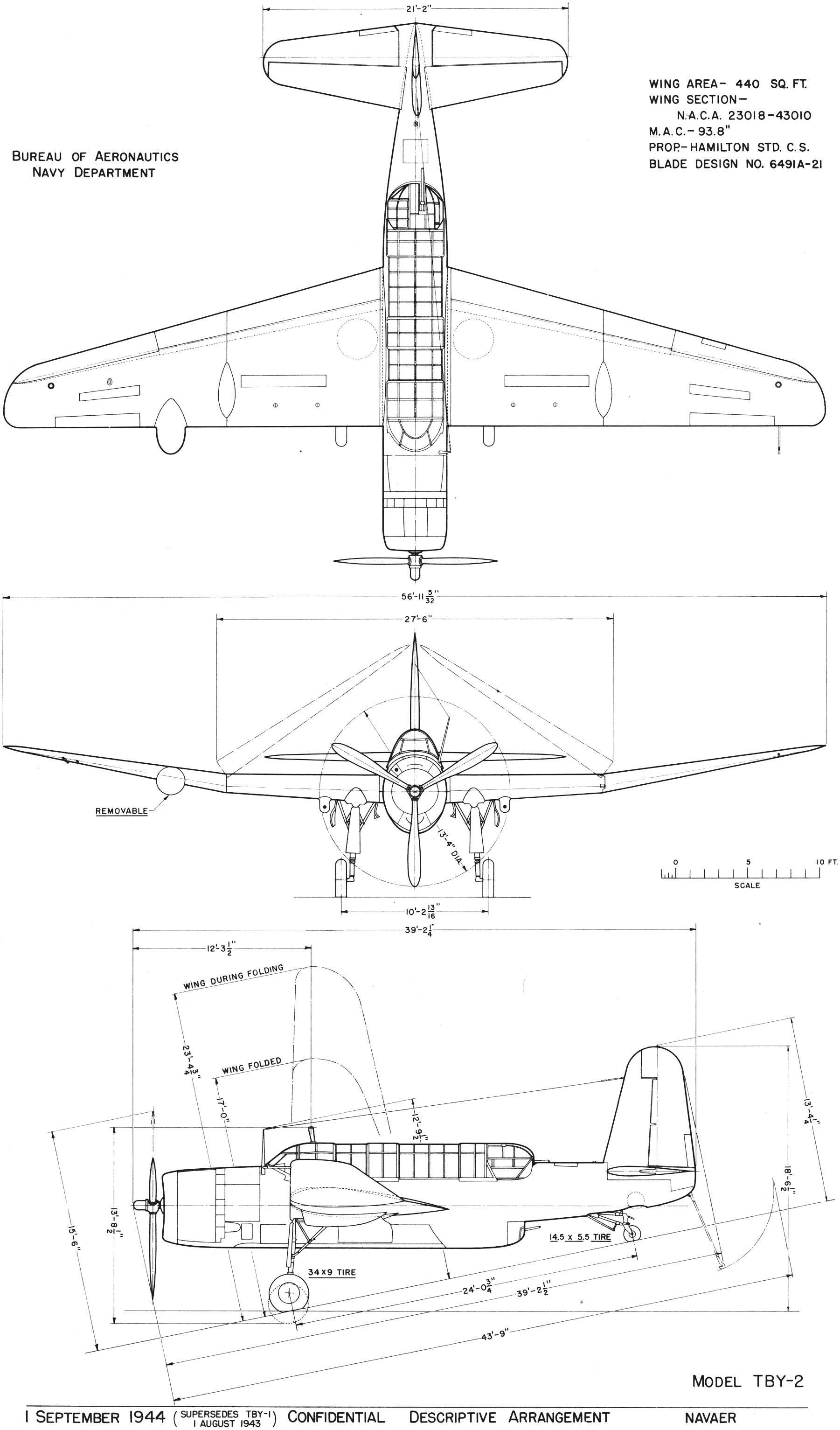

Data from General Dynamics aircraft and their predecessors

General characteristics

- Crew: 3
- Length: 39 ft 2 in (11.94 m)
- Wingspan: 56 ft 11 in (17.35 m)
- Height: 15 ft 6 in (4.72 m)
- Wing area: 440 sq ft (41 m^{2})
- Airfoil: root: NACA 23018; tip: NACA 23010
- Empty weight: 11,636 lb (5,278 kg)
- Max takeoff weight: 18,940 lb (8,591 kg)
- Powerplant: 1 × Pratt & Whitney R-2800-22 Double Wasp 18-cylinder air-cooled radial piston engine, 2,100 hp (1,600 kW)

Performance

- Maximum speed: 312 mph (502 km/h, 271 kn) at 17,700 ft (5,400 m)
- Cruise speed: 156 mph (251 km/h, 136 kn)
- Combat range: 1,025 mi (1,650 km, 891 nmi) with one torpedo
- Service ceiling: 29,400 ft (9,000 m)
- Rate of climb: 1,770 ft/min (9 m/s)

Armament

- Guns:

- 1 × .50 in (12.7 mm) M2 Browning machine gun in cowling
- 2 × .50 in machine gun in the wings
- 1 × .50 in machine gun in dorsal turret
- 1 × .30 in (7.62 mm) M1919 Browning machine gun in ventral mount

- Bombs:

- Up to 2,000 lb (910 kg) of bombs or one torpedo

== See also ==
Related development

- Vought V-326

Aircraft of comparable role, configuration, and era

- Aichi B7A
- Douglas TBD Devastator
- Douglas XTB2D Skypirate
- Fairey Barracuda
- Grumman TBF Avenger
- Nakajima B5N
- Nakajima B6N

Related lists

- List of aircraft of World War II
- List of United States Navy aircraft designations (pre-1962)
