= Vought XF2U =

XF2U
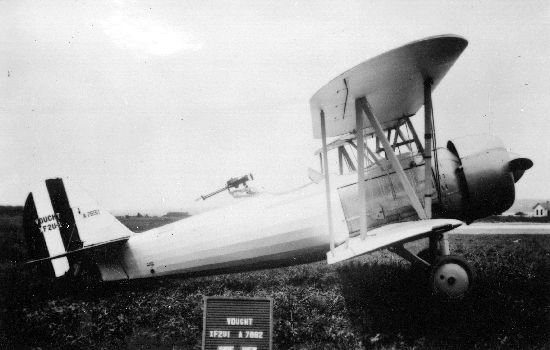

General information
- Type: Fighter
- National origin: United States
- Manufacturer: Vought
- Designer: Chance M. Vought
- Number built: 1

History
- First flight: 21 June 1929

The Vought XF2U was a prototype biplane fighter aircraft evaluated by the United States Navy at the end of the 1920s, but was already outclassed by competing designs and never put into production.

== Development and design ==
Vought's O2U Corsair, first delivered in 1927, was a successful design that set several speed and altitude record in that year. To compete for the Bureau of Aeronautics requirement for a two-seat carrier-based fighter, Vought adapted this design, but progress was slow. Ordered on 30 June 1927, the aircraft was not completed until June 1929. It was no longer state-of-the-art; in particular Curtiss' F8C Falcon was further along.

The aircraft was constructed of welded steel tubing, covered in fabric. The wings were made of wood and fabric covered. The prototype first flew on 21 June 1929, and was tested on a simulated carrier deck in Norfolk, Virginia. It was found satisfactory, allaying concerns about problems due to the rather long cowling over the engine. The aircraft then went to the Naval Aircraft Factory, who operated it until 6 March 1931, when it was lost in a crash landing.

== Specifications ==
Data from The American Fighter from 1917 to the present

General characteristics

- Crew: 2
- Length: 27 ft 0 in (8.23 m)
- Wingspan: 36 ft 0 in (10.97 m)
- Height: 10 ft 0 in (3.05 m)
- Wing area: 318 sq ft (29.5 m^{2})
- Empty weight: 1,152 lb (523 kg)
- Gross weight: 2,539 lb (1,152 kg)
- Max takeoff weight: 3,907 lb (1,772 kg)
- Powerplant: 1 × Pratt & Whitney R-1340-C/D 9-cylinder air-cooled radial piston engine, 450 hp (340 kW)
- Propellers: 2-bladed propeller

Performance

- Maximum speed: 146 mph (235 km/h, 127 kn)
- Cruise speed: 110 mph (180 km/h, 96 kn)
- Range: 495 mi (797 km, 430 nmi)
- Service ceiling: 18,700 ft (5,700 m)
- Rate of climb: 910 ft/min (4.6 m/s)

Armament

- Guns: 3x 0.30 in (7.6 mm) machine-guns
