= Vought SBU Corsair =

Dive bomber in the US Navy

SBU
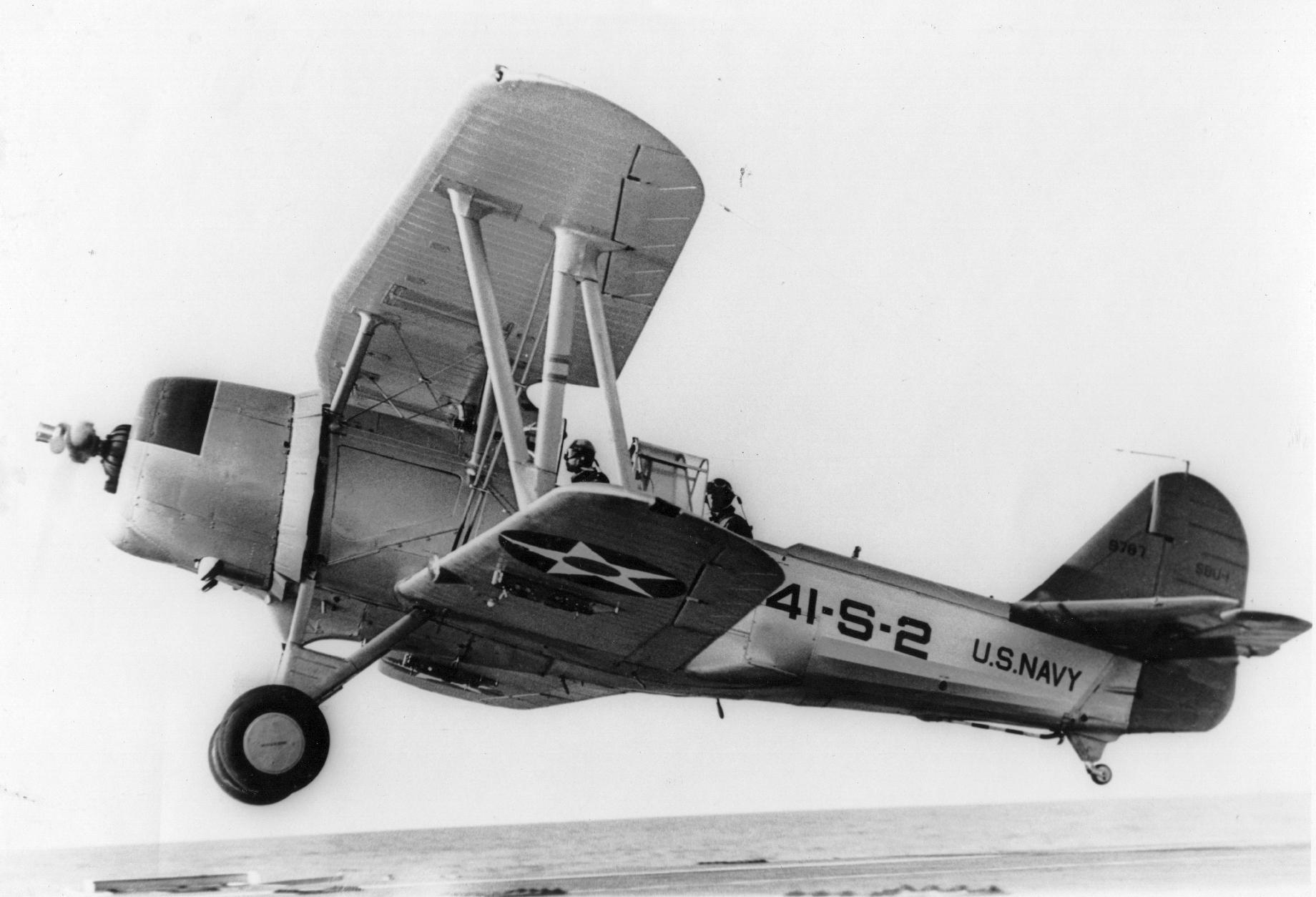
- A SBU-1 of Scouting Squadron 41

General information
- Type: Dive bomber
- National origin: United States
- Manufacturer: Vought
- Primary user: United States Navy
- Number built: 125

History
- First flight: May 1933
- Developed from: Vought XF3U
- Developed into: Vought XSB3U

The Vought SBU-1 Corsair was a two-seat, all-metal biplane dive bomber built by Vought Aircraft Company of Dallas, Texas for the US Navy. Its design was based upon the F3U-1 two-seat fighter that was abandoned when the Navy decided not to obtain any more two-seat fighters.

== Design and development ==
The aircraft was equipped with a closed cockpit, had fixed landing gear, and was powered by a Pratt & Whitney R-1535 radial air-cooled engine as had the F3U-1, but also included a controllable pitch propeller and a new NACA cowl with adjustable cowling gills on the trailing edge of the cowl. The adjustable cowling gills permitted better control of cooling airflow over the engine.

The SBU-1 completed flight tests in 1934 and went into production under a contract awarded in January 1935. The Corsair was the first aircraft of its type, a scout bomber, to fly faster than 200 mph. The last SBU Corsairs were retired from active service in 1941, being reassigned as trainers.

The name "Corsair" was used several times by Vought's planes; the O2U/O3U, SBU, F4U, and the A-7 Corsair II.

== Operators ==
Argentina

- Argentine Navy

United States

- United States Navy

== Variants ==
XF3U-1
Two-seat fighter prototype with a 700 hp R-1535-64 engine.
XSBU-1
The XF3U-1 converted to scout bomber prototype with a 700 hp R-1535-96 engine, later used as an engine test bed.
SBU-1
Original production order; 84 aircraft with 750 hp R-1535-82 engine.
SBU-2
Follow-on order; 40 aircraft with R-1535-98 engines.
Model V.142A
Export version for Argentina.

== Specifications (SBU-1) ==
Data from United States Navy Aircraft since 1911

General characteristics

- Crew: two: pilot, navigator/gunner
- Length: 27 ft 10 in (8.49 m)
- Wingspan: 36 ft 3 in (10.14 m)
- Height: 11 ft 11 in (3.63 m)
- Wing area: 327 sq ft (30.4 m^{2})
- Empty weight: 3,645 lb (1,659 kg)
- Max takeoff weight: 5,520 lb (2,509 kg)
- Powerplant: 1 × Pratt & Whitney R-1535-80 Twin Wasp Junior 14-cylinder two-row air-cooled radial engine, 700 hp (522 kW)

Performance

- Maximum speed: 178 kn (205 mph, 330 km/h) at 8,900 ft (2,700 m)
- Cruise speed: 106 kn (122 mph, 196 km/h)
- Range: 477 nmi (548 mi, 882 km)
- Service ceiling: 23,700 ft (10,800 m)
- Rate of climb: 1,180 ft/min (6.0 m/s)

Armament

- Guns: 1x Fixed forward firing .30 in (7.62 mm) Browning machine gun and 1x machine gun flexibly mounted .30 in machine gun in rear cockpit
- Bombs: 1x 500 lb (227 kg) bomb

== Bibliography ==
- Andrade, John (1979). U.S.Military Aircraft Designations and Serials since 1909. Midland Counties Publications. ISBN 0-904597-22-9.
- Johnson, E.R. (2008). American Attack Aircraft Since 1926. Jefferson, NC: McFarland & Company. ISBN 978-0-7864-3464-0.
- Swanborough, Gordon and Bowers, Peter M. United States Navy Aircraft since 1911. London:Putnam, 1976. ISBN 0-370-10054-9.
