= Chance M. Vought =

American aviation pioneer and engineer (1890–1930)

Chauncey Milton Vought
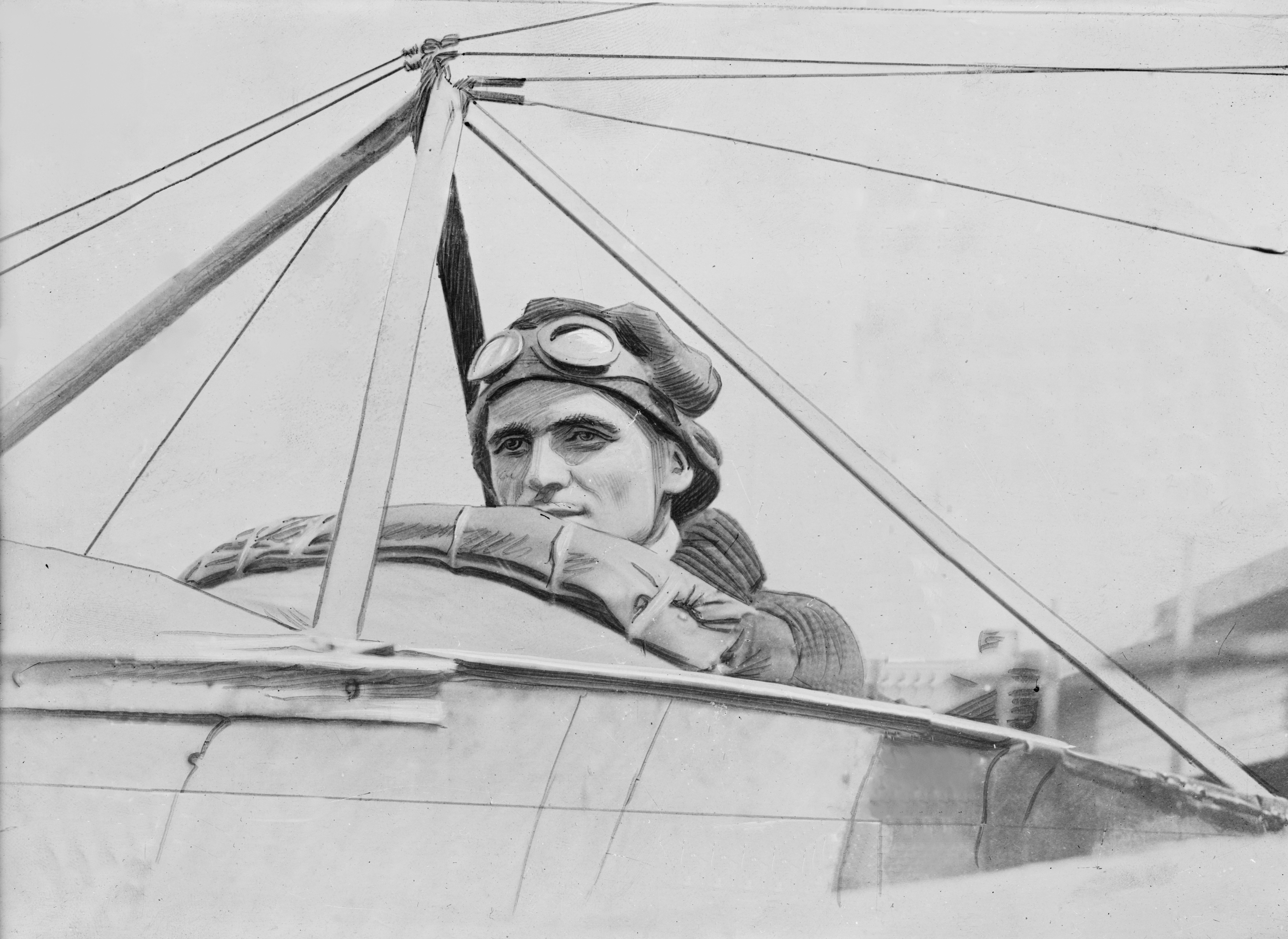
- Born: February 26, 1890; Long Island, New York
- Died: July 25, 1930 (aged 40)
- Occupation: Aeronautical engineer

Chauncey Milton "Chance" Vought (February 26, 1890 – July 25, 1930) was an American aviation pioneer and engineer, who was the co-founder of the Lewis and Vought Corporation with Birdseye Lewis.

Born on Long Island, New York, he attended the Pratt Institute, New York University (where he joined Kappa Sigma), and the University of Pennsylvania. He died from sepsis. He was inducted into the National Aviation Hall of Fame in 1989.
