= Vought XF3U =

XF3U / XSBU
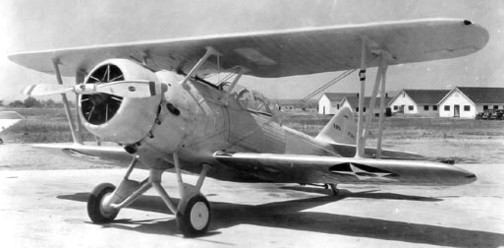

General information
- Type: Fighter
- National origin: United States
- Manufacturer: Vought
- Number built: 1

History
- First flight: May 9, 1933
- Developed into: SBU Corsair

The Vought XF3U was the prototype of a two-seat, all-metal biplane fighter, built by Vought Aircraft Company of Dallas, Texas for the United States Navy.

== Development and design ==
The XF3U was designed to meet the Bureau of Aeronautics 1932 Design Specification No. 111, which called for a high-performance fighter with a fixed undercarriage and powered by a Pratt & Whitney R-1535 Twin Wasp Junior air-cooled radial engine. Of the seven proposed aircraft the Berliner-Joyce XF3J-1, Curtiss XF12C-1, Chance Vought XF3U-1 and the Douglas XFD-1 were chosen and prototypes of each aircraft were ordered on 30 June 1932. The XF3U was the first all-metal aircraft produced by Vought. The aircraft was also equipped with an enclosed cockpit. During flight testing in 1933, it outperformed the Douglas entry and was chosen the winner.

The XF3U was also redesignated the XSBU, meaning "scout bomber."

== Operational history ==
The Navy was no longer interested in two-seat fighters, and therefore only the one XF3U prototype aircraft was built. The XF3U subsequently evolved into a dive bomber, and became the XSBU prototype for the SBU-1 Corsair.

The only one ever built had a naval bureau number of 9222.

== Specifications ==
Data from Angelucci 1987, p. 434.

General characteristics

- Crew: 2; pilot, navigator
- Length: 27 ft 10 in (8.4 m)
- Wingspan: 33 ft 3 in (10.1 m)
- Height: 11 ft 11 in (3.6 m)
- Wing area: 295 sq ft (27.4 m^{2})
- Empty weight: 3,435 lb (1,558 kg)
- Max takeoff weight: 5,297 lb (2,402 kg)
- Powerplant: 1 × Pratt & Whitney R-1535-80 Twin Wasp Jr. 14-cylinder air-cooled radial engine, 700 hp (518 kW)

Performance

- Maximum speed: 208 mph (334 km/h, 181 kn)
- Range: 570 mi (917 km, 500 nmi)
- Service ceiling: 25,300 ft (7,700 m)
- Wing loading: 18 lb/sq ft (88 kg/m^{2})
- Power/mass: 0.13 hp/lb (0.22 kW/kg)

Armament
3 × .30 in (7.62 mm) machine guns
