= Vought =

1917–1992 series of American aerospace companies

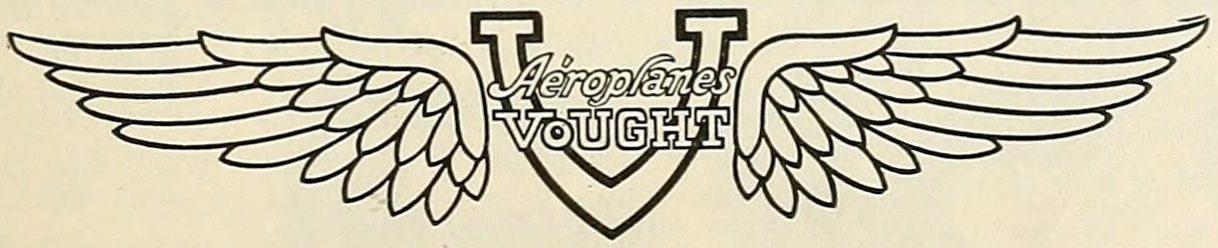

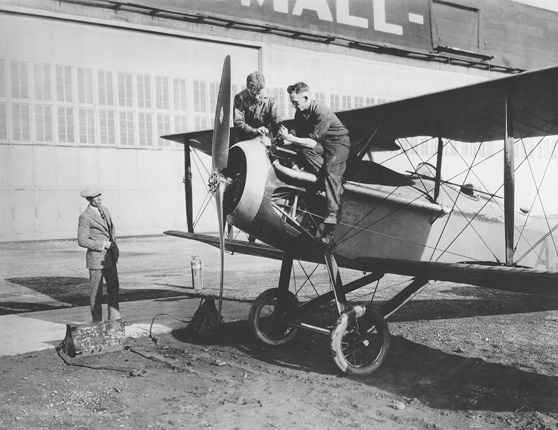
- The VE-7 was the first aircraft to launch from a U.S. Navy aircraft carrier.
- Industry: Aerospace
- Founded: 1917
- Founders: Robert B. Knowles; Birdseye Lewis; Chance M. Vought
- Key people: Rex Beisel; Boone Guyton; Charles H. Zimmerman
- Parent: United Aircraft and Transport Corporation (1928-1954); Ling-Temco-Vought (1962-1992)

Vought was the name of several related American aerospace firms. These have included, in the past, Lewis and Vought Corporation, Chance Vought, Vought-Sikorsky, LTV Aerospace (part of Ling-Temco-Vought), Vought Aircraft Companies, and Vought Aircraft Industries.

The first incarnation of Vought was established by Chance M. Vought and Birdseye Lewis in 1917. In 1928, it was acquired by United Aircraft and Transport Corporation, which a few years later became United Aircraft Corporation; this was the first of many reorganizations and buyouts. During the 1920s and 1930s, Vought Aircraft and Chance Vought specialized in carrier-based aircraft for the United States Navy, by far its biggest customer. Chance Vought produced thousands of planes during World War II, including the F4U Corsair.

Vought became independent again in 1954, and was purchased by Ling-Temco-Vought (LTV) in 1961. The company designed and produced a variety of planes and missiles throughout the Cold War. Vought was sold by LTV and owned in various degrees by the Carlyle Group and Northrop Grumman in the early 1990s. In 2000, it was fully sold to Carlyle and renamed Vought Aircraft. In June 2010, the Carlyle Group sold Vought to the Triumph Group.

== History ==
=== Chance Vought years 1917–1928 ===
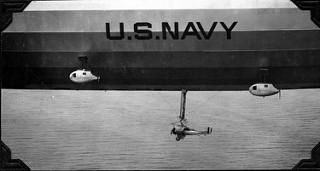
USS Los Angeles (ZR-3) equipped with a trapeze and a Vought biplane (UO-1), probably a VE-7 Bluebird, for parasite fighter tests

In 1917, the Lewis and Vought Corporation was founded by Lewis, an early aviator, and Vought, a former chief engineer of the Wright Company. They sought to take advantage of the growing field of military and civilian aviation after World War I. Operations began in Astoria, New York; in 1919, they moved to Long Island City, New York. After Lewis retired in 1922, it was renamed the Chance Vought Corporation.

Vought made history in 1922 when the Vought VE-7 trainer made the first takeoff from the deck of the USS Langley, the first American aircraft carrier. Later came the VE-11 naval fighter and the Vought O2U Corsair, the first of the Corsair aircraft.

In 1928, the company was acquired by the United Aircraft and Transport Corporation, but stayed its own separate division among the lines of Pratt & Whitney and Boeing. Vought died from sepsis in 1930, having seen his company produce a variety of fighters, trainers, flying boats, and surveillance aircraft for the United States Navy and the United States Army Air Service.

=== 1930s–1960 ===
Despite the Great Depression, Vought continued to design and manufacture aircraft at a growing pace. Soon after Chance Vought's death in 1930, the company moved its operations to East Hartford, Connecticut. Under the Air Mail Act of 1934, United Aircraft and Transportation Corp. was forced by law to divide its businesses, resulting in Boeing Aircraft, United Airlines, and the United Aircraft Corp, of which Vought was a part. In 1939, United Aircraft moved Vought to Stratford, Connecticut, where it merged with the Sikorsky division to become Vought-Sikorsky Aircraft.

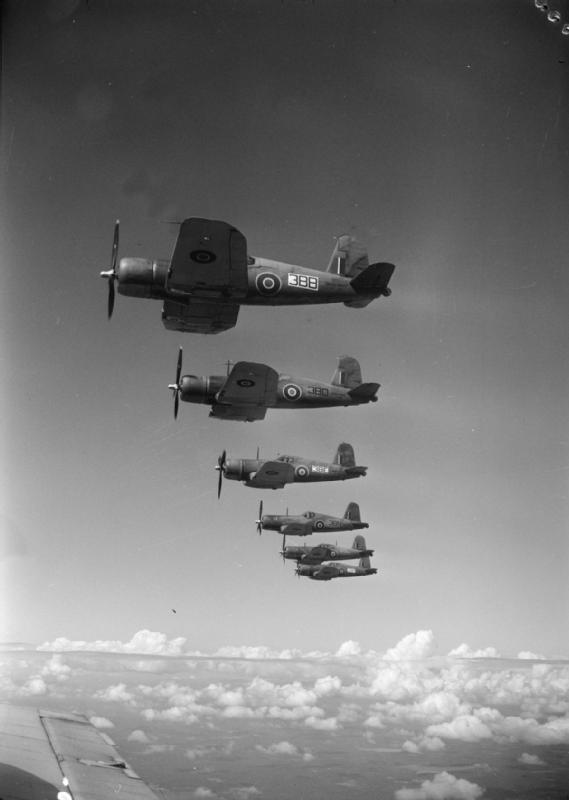
A formation of British Corsairs in 1944

Chief engineer Rex Beisel began in 1938 to develop the XF4U, recognized by its distinctive inverted gull wings. After its first flight, in 1940, thousands of F4U Corsairs were produced for the Navy and Marines in World War II. By the end of its production in 1952, Vought, Goodyear, and Brewster had all produced the Corsair fighters. Vought was reestablished as a separate division in United Aircraft in 1942.

In postwar 1949, Vought moved operations to the former North American Aviation "B" plant in Dallas, Texas. The move was pushed by the Navy, who believed that having both of its main aircraft suppliers on the East Coast was an unnecessary risk. Vought moved 27 million pounds of equipment and 1,300 employees in 14 months, a record-breaking industrial move at the time.

In 1954, the company separated from United Aircraft and became the independent Chance Vought Aircraft Inc.

Vought began making its F-8 Crusader for the Navy in 1957; it was one of the Navy's first supersonic fighters and its last all-gun fighter. The same basic design was later heavily revised and shortened to produce Vought's A-7 Corsair II, a carrier-borne close-air-support and attack plane. Entering service in 1965, the Corsair II was heavily engaged in a close support and strike missions during the Vietnam War, beginning in 1967. The A-7 also participated in the U.S. invasion of Grenada in 1983; a punitive raid on Syrian missile sites in 1983; reprisal raids against Libya during Operation El Dorado Canyon in 1986; strikes against Iranian coastal platforms and naval forces during Operation Praying Mantis in 1988; support of the 1989 invasion of Panama; and throughout operations during Desert Storm in 1991. The A-7A, A-7B, A-7C and A-7E served with the US Navy while the A-7D was purchased by the US Air Force and Air National Guard. Two-seat models known as TA-7C/Es served with the U.S. Navy while the US Air Force purchased the TA-7K. The A-7 served in limited numbers with three foreign air forces, including Greece (A-7H/TA-7H), Portugal (A-7P/TA-7P) and Thailand (ex-USN A-7E/TA-7E).

=== LTV acquisition 1960–1990 ===
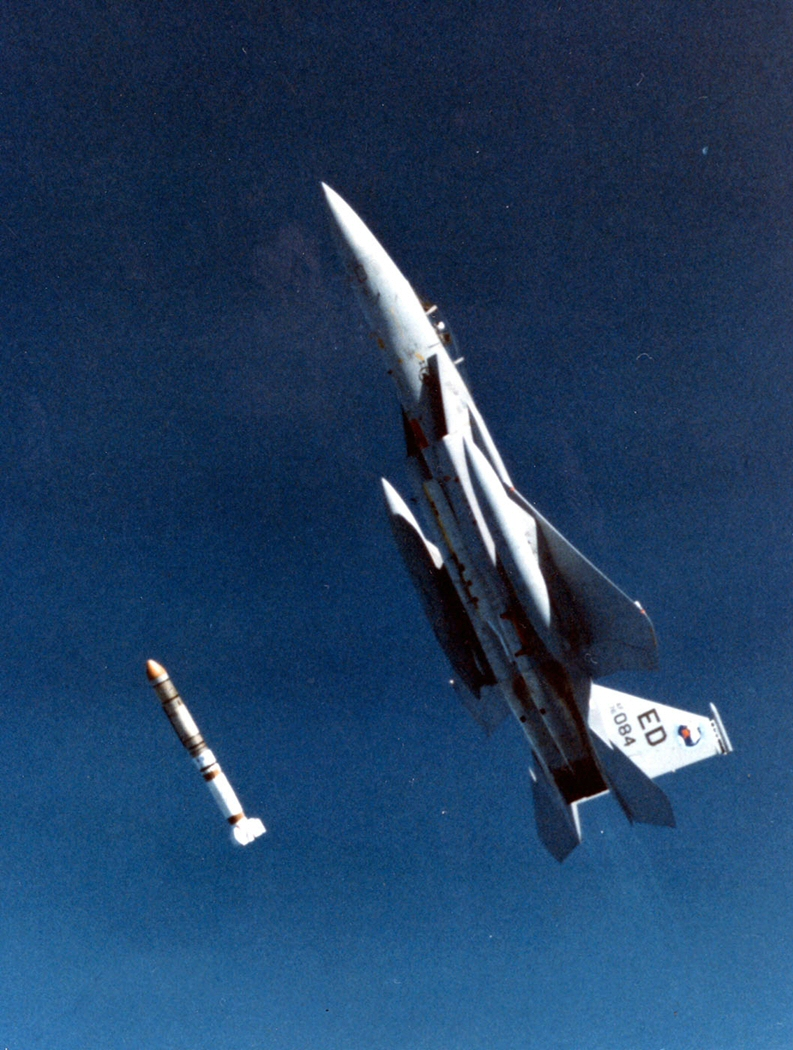
Launch of Vought's ASAT in 1983

In 1962, Vought was bought by James Ling, who formed a conglomerate dubbed Ling-Temco-Vought (LTV). Vought Aeronautics and Vought Missiles and Space continued to develop and produce for the Air Force and Navy under the umbrella of LTV Aerospace.

The first of two decades of reorganizations began in 1972 with the creation of Vought Systems by the merging of the Vought Missiles and Space and Aeronautics divisions. All of LTV Aerospace was renamed the Vought Corporation in 1976, but by 1983 the Vought company was again split along aeronautic and missile lines under LTV Aerospace and Defense.

By the early 1980s, LTV was struggling, and Vought laid off many employees.

In 1992, LTV sold Vought to Northrop and the Carlyle Group, each owning roughly half of the company. It sold the missile division to the Loral Corporation, part of Lockheed Martin Missiles and Fire Control.

=== 1990s to present ===
Northrop Grumman, the successor to Northrop and Grumman, bought the Carlyle Group's Vought interest for $130 million in 1994.

In 2000, Carlyle Group reincorporated Vought Aircraft Industries, Inc. and acquired the Northrop Grumman aerostructures business, reviving the Vought name. It is primarily an aerostructures subcontractor. Vought is heavily involved in the Boeing 747, Boeing 787 aircraft as well as supplying parts for the F-22 Raptor and F-35 Lightning II and the V-22 Osprey. In July 2003, the Aerostructures Corp., owned by the Carlyle Group and based in Nashville, Tennessee, merged with Vought. Vought's Nashville site supplies wing components for Airbus A319, A320, A330, and A340.

Boeing announced in July 2009 that it had agreed to acquire the North Charleston, South Carolina, facility of Vought Aircraft Industries, where Vought builds sections 47 and 48 of the aft fuselage for Boeing's 787 Dreamliner. Boeing agreed to pay $580 million for the facility.

In June 2010, the Carlyle Group sold Vought to the Triumph Group, an aerospace component manufacturer. The Vought acquisitions now operate as Triumph Aerostructures - Vought Aircraft Division. The Dallas/Grand Prairie facility was closed; operations moved to a new facility in Red Oak, Texas.

== Products ==
=== Aircraft ===
Model name	First flight	Number built	Type
Vought VE-7	1917	128	Piston engine biplane trainer and fighter
Vought O2U Corsair	1926	580	Piston engine biplane observation aircraft
Vought FU	1927	20	Piston engine biplane fighter
Vought XF2U	1929	1	Prototype piston engine biplane fighter
Vought O4U Corsair	1931	2	Prototype piston engine biplane observation aircraft
Vought XF3U	1933	1	Prototype piston engine biplane fighter
Vought SBU Corsair	1933	125	Piston engine biplane dive bomber
Vought O5U	1934	1	Prototype piston engine biplane observation floatplane
Vought SB2U Vindicator	1936	260	Piston engine monoplane dive bomber
Vought V-141	1936	1	Prototype piston engine monoplane fighter
Vought XSB3U	1936	1	Prototype piston engine biplane dive bomber
Vought OS2U Kingfisher	1938	1,519	Piston engine monoplane observation floatplane
Vought XSO2U	1939	1	Piston engine monoplane observation floatplane
Vought F4U Corsair	1940	12,571	Piston engine monoplane fighter
Vought TBU Sea Wolf	1941	1	Piston engine monoplane torpedo bomber
Vought V-173	1942	1	Experimental piston engine "circular wing" aircraft
Vought F6U Pirate	1946	33	Jet engine monoplane fighter
Vought XF5U	1943	2	Prototype piston engine "circular wing" fighter
Vought F7U Cutlass	1948	320	Jet engine monoplane tailless fighter
Vought XS2U	N/A	0	Unbuilt piston engine monoplane anti-submarine aircraft
Vought F8U Crusader	1955	1,219	Jet engine monoplane fighter
Vought XF8U-3 Crusader III	1958	5	Prototype jet engine monoplane fighter
LTV XC-142	1964	5	Prototype turboprop tiltwing cargo aircraft
LTV A-7 Corsair II	1965	1,545	Jet engine monoplane attack aircraft
LTV L450F	1970	1	Prototype turboprop monoplane reconnaissance aircraft
LTV YA-7F	1989	2	Prototype jet engine monoplane attack aircraft
Vought Model 1600	N/A	0	Unbuilt jet engine monoplane fighter

=== Unmanned aerial vehicles ===
- LTV XQM-93

=== Missiles ===
- M270 Multiple Launch Rocket System (1983)
- ASM-135 ASAT (1984)
- MGM-52 Lance (1972)
- MGM-140 ATACMS (1988)
- SSM-N-8 Regulus (1951)
- SSM-N-9 Regulus II (1956)
- Vought Hyper-Velocity Missile (1980s)

=== Rockets ===
- Scout (rocket family)
  - RM-89 Blue Scout I
  - RM-90 Blue Scout II
  - Scout X
  - Scout X-1
  - Scout X-1A
  - Scout X-2
  - Scout X-2B
  - Scout X-2M

=== Workshare projects ===
- Airbus A320 family (upper wing panel assemblies)
- Airbus A330 and A340-200/-300 (mid- and outer-leading edge assemblies, mid-rear spars, center spar assembly, flaps, fairings and upper panel assemblies )
- Airbus A340-500/-600 (mid- and outer-leading edge assemblies, mid-rear spars, center spar assembly, upper panels and stringers)
- Boeing C-17 Globemaster III (ailerons, elevators, and rudders)
- Bell-Boeing V-22 Osprey (empennage, ramp/ramp door)
- Boeing 747 (fuselage panels, tail section)
- Boeing 767 (center wingbox, horizontal stabilizer)
- Boeing 777 (spoilers, flaps)
- Boeing 787 (fuselage barrels—Sections 47 and 48)
- Rockwell B-1B Lancer (aft fuselage and aft intermediate fuselage)
- Lockheed C-5M Super Galaxy (flight control surfaces)
- Lockheed C-130 Hercules (empennage)
- Lockheed Martin F-22 Raptor (stabilator)
- Northrop B-2 Spirit (intermediate wing section)
- Sikorsky UH-60 Blackhawk/Sikorsky SH-60 Seahawk
