= Call signs in Mexico =

Radio identification in Mexico

Call signs in Mexico are unique identifiers for telecommunications, radio communication, radio broadcasting and transmission. They are regulated internationally by the International Telecommunication Union (ITU) as well as nationally by the Federal Telecommunications Institute, which regulates broadcast stations, wireless telecommunications and spectrum use.

The ITU has assigned Mexico the following call sign blocks for radio communication, broadcasting or transmission:

Call sign block
XAA–XIZ
4AA–4CZ
6DA–6JZ

While not directly related to call signs, the ITU further divided all countries assigned amateur radio prefixes into three regions; Mexico is located in ITU Region 2. Mexico is in ITU zone 10 and CQ zone 6.

== Broadcasting ==
=== XE ===
Mexico uses the prefix XE for radio stations in the AM and shortwave services. Following the callsign, either the suffix -AM or -OC (Onda Corta, the Spanish term for shortwave) are included. Sometimes, FM or television stations also have “XE” callsigns, but these are typically old (e.g., XETRA-FM and XETV-TDT).

=== XH ===
XH is used exclusively for FM radio stations, and television stations. FM stations’ calls carry the -FM suffix, whereas digital television stations carry the -TDT suffix; -TV was used for analog television stations.

== Amateur radio ==
The IFT issues call signs in the XE and XF series for amateur use, the latter mainly for offshore use. 60,000 licensed ham radio operators broadcast in Mexico.

The separating numeral is used to identify the region in which the amateur is licensed:

Prefix	Region	
XE1	Central Mexico	Colima, Distrito Federal (Federal District, most of Mexico City), Guanajuato, Hidalgo, Jalisco, Mexico (the state surrounding the Distrito Federal on 3 sides, includes some parts of Mexico City), Michoacan, Morelos, Nayarit, Puebla, Querétaro, Tlaxcala, and Veracruz
XE2	Northern Mexico	Aguascalientes, Baja California (northern half of the peninsula), Baja California Sur (southern half of the peninsula), Chihuahua, Coahuila, Durango, Nuevo León, San Luis Potosí, Sinaloa, Sonora, Tamaulipas, and Zacatecas
XE3	Southern Mexico	Campeche, Chiapas, Guerrero, Oaxaca, Quintana Roo, Tabasco, and Yucatán
XF1	BC islands	around the Baja California peninsula in the Pacific Ocean or the northern part of the Gulf of California
XF2	close central islands	off the Pacific coast of the Mexican mainland, in the Gulf of Mexico, or in the southern Gulf of California, generally west of 90°W.
XF3	Caribbean islands	Caribbean islands, generally east of 90°W.
XF4, XF0	Revillagigedo	Revillagigedo island group, in the Pacific Ocean

=== Foreign ham operators ===
Typically, a permit to operate in Mexico states the call sign, which can be the home call sign with a further XE prefix. For instance a home call sign of WA1ZZZ becomes XE1/WA1ZZZ.

Further, those who operate outside of the XE1 area would add an identifying suffix – for instance XE1/WA1ZZZ/XE2 to operate in northern Mexico. The call sign must be given always as enumerated on the permit, and the operator's location must be stated in Spanish.

The permit does not automatically allow operation in XF island areas. Special permission must be sought for island operation.

=== Special events ===
Call signs in the 6DA–6JZ block have been used for special events. In 2007, 6G1LM was assigned to Federación Mexicana de Radioexperimentadores for their 75th anniversary, as was 6F75A. Occasionally, other special call sign prefixes have been briefly allowed, such as XA5T, XB9Z, and XE0DX during amateur radio contests. 4C1ASM was used by the Asociación de Scouts de Mexico (Mexican Scouts Association) during the Jamboree on the Air JOTA for some years.

6H1 also replaced the XE1 prefix, 6I2 replaced the XE2 prefix, and 6J3 replaced the XE3 prefix. 6E4 replaced XF4 for the Revillagigedo island group.

== See also ==
- Amateur radio international operation
- Call signs
- ITU prefix – amateur and experimental stations
- Amateur radio license
