= VMA-131 =

Marine Attack Squadron 131
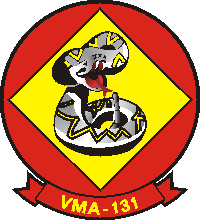
- VMA-131 Insignia
- Active: Mar 1919 - 16 Nov 1945; 15 Apr 1958 – 5 Dec 1998
- Country: United States
- Allegiance: United States of America
- Branch: United States Marine Corps
- Type: Attack Squadron
- Role: Close air support Air interdiction
- Part of: Inactive
- Nickname: Diamondbacks
- Tail Code: QG
- Engagements: Banana Wars * Dominican Republic; World War II * Battle of Guadalcanal * Battle of Okinawa

Commanders
- Notable commanders: Vernon M. Guymon

Aircraft flown
- Attack: A-4 Skyhawk
- Bomber: O3U-6 Corsair; Great Lakes BG (1939-41); SB2U-3 Vindicator; SBD Dauntless; TBM Avenger

Marine Attack Squadron 131 (VMA-131) was an A-4 Skyhawk attack squadron in the United States Marine Corps. The squadron, also known as the "Diamondbacks", were part of the Marine Forces Reserve and were based at Naval Air Station New York, Brooklyn, New York from 1960 through 1970 and NASJRB Willow Grove from 1971 until their deactivation in 1998.

== History ==
=== Early years ===
The squadron was formed as the 1st Air Squadron in Santo Domingo, Dominican Republic in March 1919. They were redesignated VO-4M on 29 May 1922 and returned to Marine Corps Base Quantico in 1924. The squadron was again redesignated as VO-7M on 1 July 1927. Ten years later on 1 July 1937 the squadron again changed names, this time to Marine Scouting Squadron 1 (VMS-1). Exactly four years later saw a fifth name change to Marine Scout-Bomber Squadron 131 (VMSB-131).

=== World War II ===
Following the attack on Pearl Harbor the squadron was ordered to San Diego, California. After months of training, the squadron left San Francisco on September 6, 1942, on board the USS Mount Vernon heading for Marine Corps Air Station Ewa, Hawaii. On September 24, the squadron began transferring its SBD Dauntless Divebombers in exchange for Grumman TBF Avengers. In November 1942, the squadron was reorganized as the first Marine torpedo bombing squadron and sent to Henderson Field and Espiritu Santo to become part of the Cactus Air Force during the Battle of Guadalcanal.

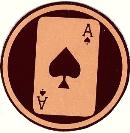
Squadron logo in World War II when they were VMSB-131

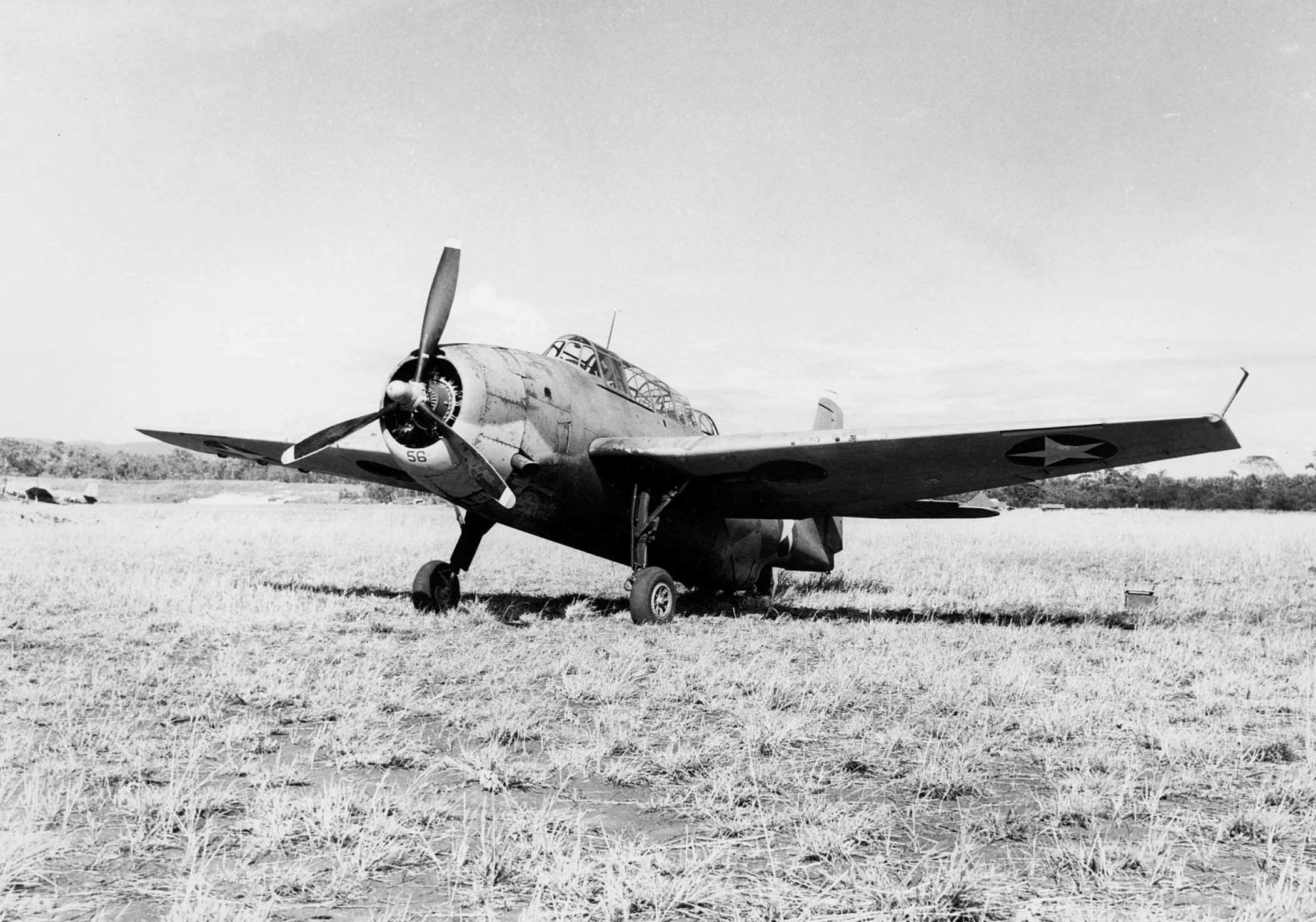
A VMSB-131 TBF-1 on Guadalcanal.

During the fighting crews and pilots rotated between these two bases. The squadron was relieved on 18 February 1943 but rejoined the fighting in April 1943. During its time on Guadalcanal, VMSB-131 scored 14 sure hits and 6 probables with its torpedoes against Japanese shipping. They also scored 6 direct hits against ships with bombs. All this came at a cost of 8 pilots and 17 radiomen and gunners killed in action. For their efforts six pilots were awarded the Distinguished Flying Cross for heroism. The squadron finally left the combat zone and returned to Marine Corps Air Station El Toro in June 1943 and were redesignated Marine Torpedo Bombing Squadron 131 VMTB-131.

After a year of rest, refitting, and training, VMTB-131 again deployed to the Pacific Theater on 29 March 1944 this time on board the USS Petrof Bay. They finally arrived in Guam in August 1944 and flew anti-submarine patrols for the next eight months. On 27 April 1945 the squadron was attached to Marine Aircraft Group 22 (MAG-22) and departed for Okinawa. During the Battle of Okinawa they were based out of Ie Shima, an island just to the northwest of Okinawa, and continued to fly anti-submarine patrols and also provided close air support for American ground forces. On 25 July 1945 they were transferred under the command of Marine Aircraft Group 14 (MAG-14) and went ashore to be based out of Okinawa where they remained until the end of the war. The squadron returned to the west coast and were deactivated on 16 November 1945.

== Reserve years ==
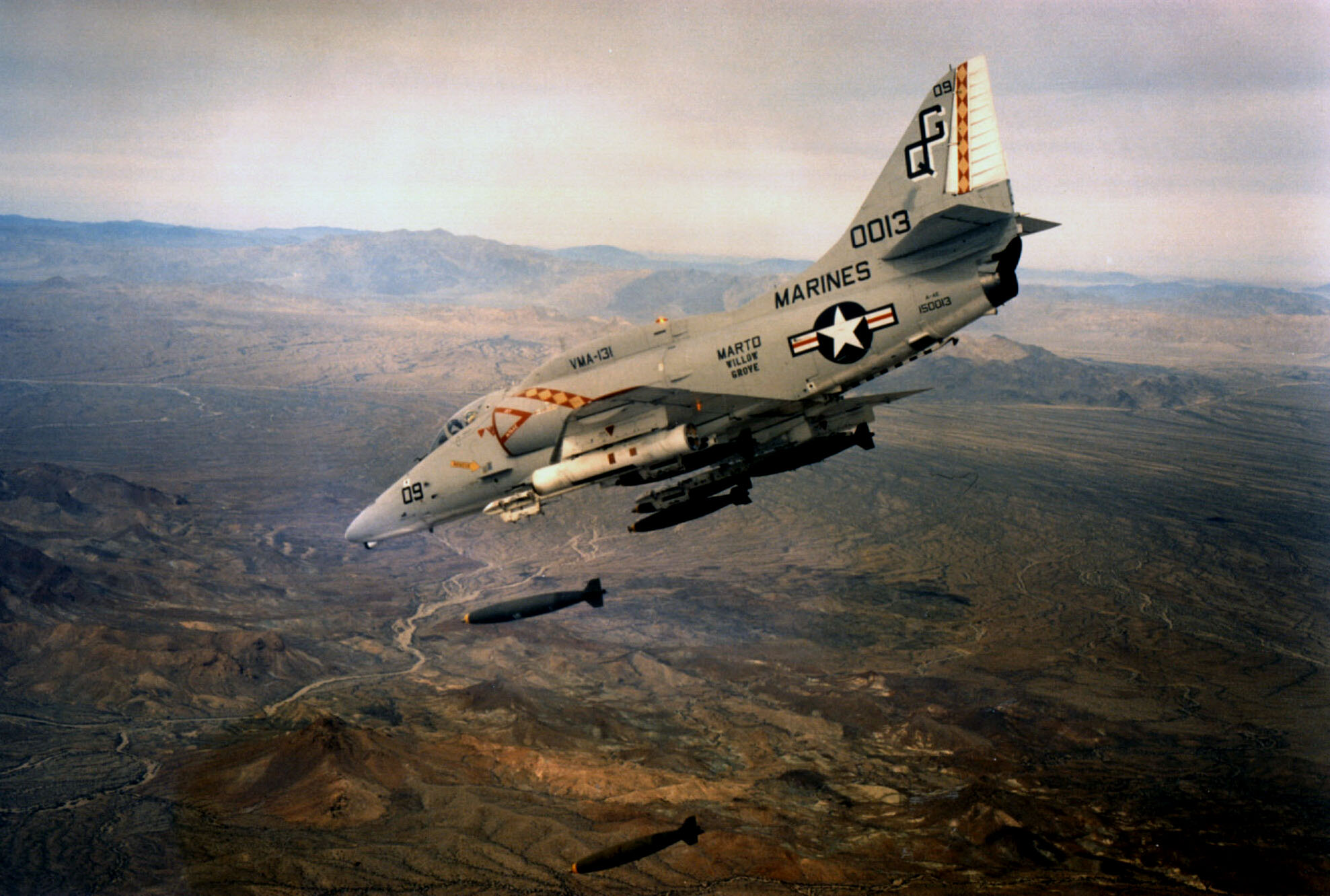
An A-4E of VMA-131 drops Mk 82 bombs during a training mission.

On 15 April 1958, VMF-131 was recommissioned as part of the Marine Air Reserve. The squadron was based out of Naval Air Station New York, Brooklyn, New York and flew the North American FJ-4 Fury. On 1 July 1962, the squadron's designation was changed to VMA-131 when it transitioned to the Douglas A-4 Skyhawk. VMA-131 remained at NAS New York until 1970 when it moved to Naval Air Station Joint Reserve Base Willow Grove, Pennsylvania until 1998.

- On 15 October 1959, an FJ Fury from VMF-131 suffered an engine fire over Southampton, New York. First Lt. James Dawson piloted the crippled aircraft south over the Atlantic Ocean, before ejecting. Unfortunately, he was unable to free himself of his parachute in the rough waters and died aboard a Coast Guard rescue boat.
- On 12 January 1990 an A-4 Skyhawk from the squadron crashed on approach to NAS Willow Grove, coming down in Upper Moreland Township, impacting in an intersection, with debris tearing off the roof of an auto-leasing business, destroying four cars and damaging six houses with no injuries on the ground. The pilot parachuted into tree nearby suffering only minor injuries.
- On 22 June 1994 the squadron officially retired its last A-4M aircraft. Four pilots flew a short flight that included a flyby the field. Aside from the various Marines from the squadron and MAG-49, there were family and invited guests.
- In December 1998, VMA-131 stood down as a squadron, LtCol. Volland the last Squadron Commander at the time.

== See also ==
- United States Marine Corps Aviation
- List of United States Marine Corps aircraft squadrons
- List of decommissioned United States Marine Corps aircraft squadrons
