= XF6 =

XF6 may refer to:

== Aircraft ==
- Boeing XF6B, experimental biplane fighter
- Curtiss F6C Hawk (experimental designations XF6C-4 to XF6C-7), biplane fighter
- Grumman F6F Hellcat (experimental designations XF6F-1 to XF6F-6), monoplane fighter

== Other uses ==
- The X Factor (British series 6), British TV series
- Yamaha MOTIF XF6, electronic keyboard
