= Wasp Junior =

Wasp Junior may refer to one of two engines of the Pratt & Whitney Wasp series:

- Pratt & Whitney R-985 Wasp Junior
- Pratt & Whitney R-1535 Twin Wasp Junior
