= Vought V-141 =

American fighter prototype

V-141 / V-143
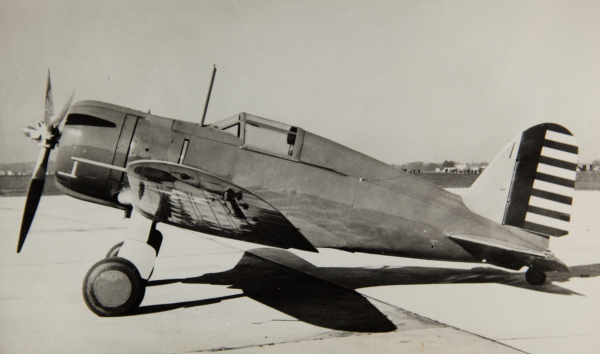
- The V-141

General information
- Type: Fighter aircraft
- National origin: United States
- Manufacturer: Vought
- Number built: 1

History
- First flight: 29 March 1936
- Developed from: Northrop 3-A

The Vought V-141 (which was later redesignated V-143 after modification) was a prototype American single-seat fighter aircraft of the 1930s. It was a development of the unsuccessful Northrop 3-A design, but was itself a failure, being rejected by the United States Army Air Corps. The sole prototype was sold to the Japanese Army in 1937, but no production followed, with the type proving to be inferior to existing Japanese fighters.

== Design and development ==
In 1935, Northrop had flown the Northrop 3A, a single-engined, single-seat monoplane with a fixed undercarriage, to meet a United States Army Air Corps (USAAC) requirement for a single-seat fighter. This was a development of Northrop's XFT prototype carrier fighter, and shared the XFT's instability and tendency to enter spins. The sole Northrop 3A prototype disappeared during a test flight over the Pacific on 30 July 1935, and Northrop decided to abandon further development of the 3A.

The Air Corps' requirement for a new fighter was still outstanding however, with final evaluation being delayed several times. Despite the warnings of his engineers, Eugene Wright, President of Vought, decided to buy the 3A project from Northrop with the hope of winning orders from the Air Corps, the purchase being agreed early in 1936.

Vought's design team had little time to work on the new fighter if it was to compete in the Air Corps competition, and changes made to the design purchased from Northrop were relatively small, with an enlarged rudder being fitted in a bid to solve the handling problems of the XFT and 3A, while the undercarriage and engine cowling were also modified. In this form, the prototype fighter, designated Vought V-141 by the manufacturer, made its first flight on 29 March 1936. Like the 3A, the V-141 was a low-wing monoplane with a retractable tailwheel undercarriage and an enclosed cockpit. It was powered by a 750 hp (560 kW) Pratt & Whitney R-1535 Twin Wasp Junior radial engine, a slightly more powerful version of the engine that powered the 3A.

The competing bids were evaluated by the Air Corps in April 1936. Vought offered to sell V-141s at a unit price of $34,148 for a batch of 25 aircraft (excluding engines and Government provided equipment), reducing to $16,041 for a batch of 200 aircraft. Testing showed that the V-141 still had poor handling and was prone to spinning, and also suffered from tail flutter, leading to it being rejected. The primary winner of the competition was Seversky, with 77 P-35s being ordered.

Vought then offered it for export, modifying it with larger tail surfaces and renaming it the Vought V-143. This was offered to Argentina as a replacement for its obsolete Dewoitine D.21s. When it came to be tested in Argentina, Curtiss-Wright representatives, eager to sell the Curtiss 75, pointed out that the Vought was fitted with an anti-spin parachute in the tail. When the Argentines demanded that the spin characteristics be demonstrated without the parachute, Vought refused, and the Curtiss 75 was selected instead.

Further rejections from Turkey, Norway and Yugoslavia followed. This led to Vought, in a final attempt to solve the fighter's handling problems, to rebuild the aircraft again in May 1937, with a longer rear fuselage and a new taller tail resembling that of the Vought SB2U. The engine was replaced by an 825 hp (615 kW) R-1535-SB4G. Thus modified, the V-143 was tested again by the USAAC in June 1937 but was rejected again. The V-143 prototype was finally purchased by Japan in July 1937 for $175,000. It underwent a technical evaluation by the Japanese Navy as the Navy Experimental Fighter Type V (for Vought) (short designation AXV1), although they had no intention of using them.

== Specifications (V-143 – final layout) ==
Data from The American Fighter

General characteristics

- Crew: 1
- Length: 26 ft 0 in (7.92 m)
- Wingspan: 33 ft 6 in (10.21 m)
- Height: 9 ft 4 in (2.84 m)
- Wing area: 187 sq ft (17.4 m^{2})
- Empty weight: 3,940 lb (1,787 kg)
- Gross weight: 4,370 lb (1,982 kg)
- Fuel capacity: 112 US Gallon, 424 L
- Powerplant: 1 × Pratt & Whitney R-1535-SB4G air-cooled radial engine, 825 hp (615 kW)

Performance

- Maximum speed: 292 mph (470 km/h, 254 kn) at 11,485 ft (3,500 m)
- Cruise speed: 221 mph (356 km/h, 192 kn)
- Range: 808 mi (1,300 km, 702 nmi) at 18,045 ft (5,500 m) (55% power)
- Service ceiling: 30,600 ft (9,300 m)
- Time to altitude: 3 min 6 sec to 10,000 ft (3,050 m)

Armament

- Guns: 2 × .30 in (7.62 mm) machine guns
- Bombs: 300 lb (140 kg) bombs

== See also ==
- Northrop XFT
