= Nikitin NV-2 =

General information
- Type: Sporting Aircraft
- National origin: USSR
- Designer: Vasilii Vasilyevich Nikitin
- Number built: 3 (200+ ordered)

History
- First flight: 1935

The Nikitin NV-2 was a single-seat sporting aircraft produced in the USSR from 1935.

== Development ==
After poor results from the NV-1, Nikitin designed a new sporting aircraft built entirely from wood, with plywood skinned wings and a fuselage built using shpon (layers of birch ply glued over a mold/template). The NV-2 had a retractable tailskid undercarriage, with the main gears retracting backwards into fairings on the underside of the cantilever monoplane. Nikitin secured funding for the NV-2 from Osoaviakhim (Society for assistance to the aviation and chemical industries), and the aircraft was built at OKB-30. Flight testing revealed excellent performance and flying qualities.

Further development resulted in the NV-2bis with a more powerful engine in a long chord NACA cowling, and minor structural modifications. An order for 10 from the Soviet Air Force was abandoned when the factory was assigned to produce the Yakovlev UT-2.

One more prototype was ordered by the UVVS as the UTI-5, incorporating even more strengthening, fully retracting main undercarriage, more power and two machine-guns. The UTI-5 was flown successfully early in 1939 with over 40 test pilots from the VVS and Industry praising the performance of the aircraft, as well as the finish which was far better than that of the Polikarpov I-16. The UVVS ordered 200, (some sources state 20), but production did not take place for unknown reasons.

== Variants ==
- NV-2 - Initial prototype built in 1935 with a 100 hp M-11 engine.
- NV-2bis - Second prototype with more powerful 165 hp MG-11 engine and structural modifications.
- UTI-5 - Fighter Trainer version of NV-2bis, with a 300 hp MG-31 engine, fully retracting main undercarriage and two synchronised machine-guns in the forward fuselage

== Specifications (UTI-5) ==
Data from Gunston, Bill. "Encyclopedia of Russian Aircraft 1875-1995". London:Osprey. 1995. ISBN 1-85532-405-9

General characteristics

- Crew: 1
- Length: 6.3 m (20 ft 8 in)
- Wingspan: 8.0 m (26 ft 3 in)
- Wing area: 11 m^{2} (118 sq ft)
- Empty weight: 560 kg (1,235 lb)
- Gross weight: 950 kg (2,094 lb)
- Powerplant: 1 × MG-31 , 223.7 kW (300 hp)

Performance

- Maximum speed: 350 km/h (217 mph, 189 kn)
- Endurance: 4 hours 30 minutes
- Service ceiling: 8,000 m (26,250 ft)

Armament

- 2 x 7.62mm ShKAS synchronised to fire through the propeller.

== See also ==
Aircraft of comparable role, configuration, and era

- Polikarpov I-16
- Northrop 3A
- Northrop FT
- Seversky AP-1

Related lists

- List of aircraft
