= Boeing P-29 =

Fighter aircraft prototype series by Boeing

P-29/XF7B-1
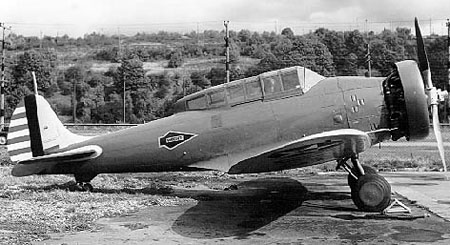
- Boeing P-29 in its original configuration (U.S. Air Force photo)

General information
- Type: Fighter
- Manufacturer: Boeing
- Primary users: U.S. Army Air Corps U.S. Navy
- Number built: 4

History
- Introduction date: Cancelled
- First flight: 20 January 1934 (Boeing Model 264)
- Developed from: Boeing P-26

The Boeing P-29 and XF7B-1 were an attempt to produce a more advanced version of the P-26 Peashooter. Although slight gains were made in performance, the U.S. Army Air Corps and U.S. Navy did not order the aircraft.

== Design and development ==
The Boeing YP-29 originated as the Model 264, developed as a private venture under a bailment contract negotiated with the U.S. Army. Development of three prototypes was initiated in the interval between the testing of the XP-936 (P-26 prototype, company Model 248) and the delivery of the first P-26A (Model 266) to the U.S. Army.

The Model 264 was an updated and modernized P-26, differing in having fully cantilever wings of elliptical-design, wing flaps, enclosed "greenhouse" canopy, and retractable undercarriage. The landing gear was similar to the Boeing Monomail, the main wheels retracting backwards about halfway into the wings. The fuselage and the tail were basically the same as those of the P-26. The 264 retained the proven 550 hp Pratt & Whitney R-1340-31 Wasp air-cooled radial, used in the P-26. The armament of one 0.30-cal and one 0.50 cal machine guns mounted in the fuselage sides and firing between the cylinder heads of the radial engine was the same as the P-26A.

The first Model 264 featured a long, narrow, sliding canopy, essentially a transparent continuation of the P-26's protective headrest, extending all the way to the windshield frame. The Wasp radial was enclosed in a full NACA cowling rather than the narrow Townend ring of the P-26.

One final variant was considered by Boeing, the Model 273, which was intended for the U.S. Navy as the XF7B-1. Aside from slight dimensional variations, military equipment carried, and the performance ratings of its Wasp engine, the naval fighter was very similar to its Army antecedents. Like the other variants, its enclosed cockpit was eventually modified into an open cockpit, which was considered more acceptable in the era.

== Testing ==
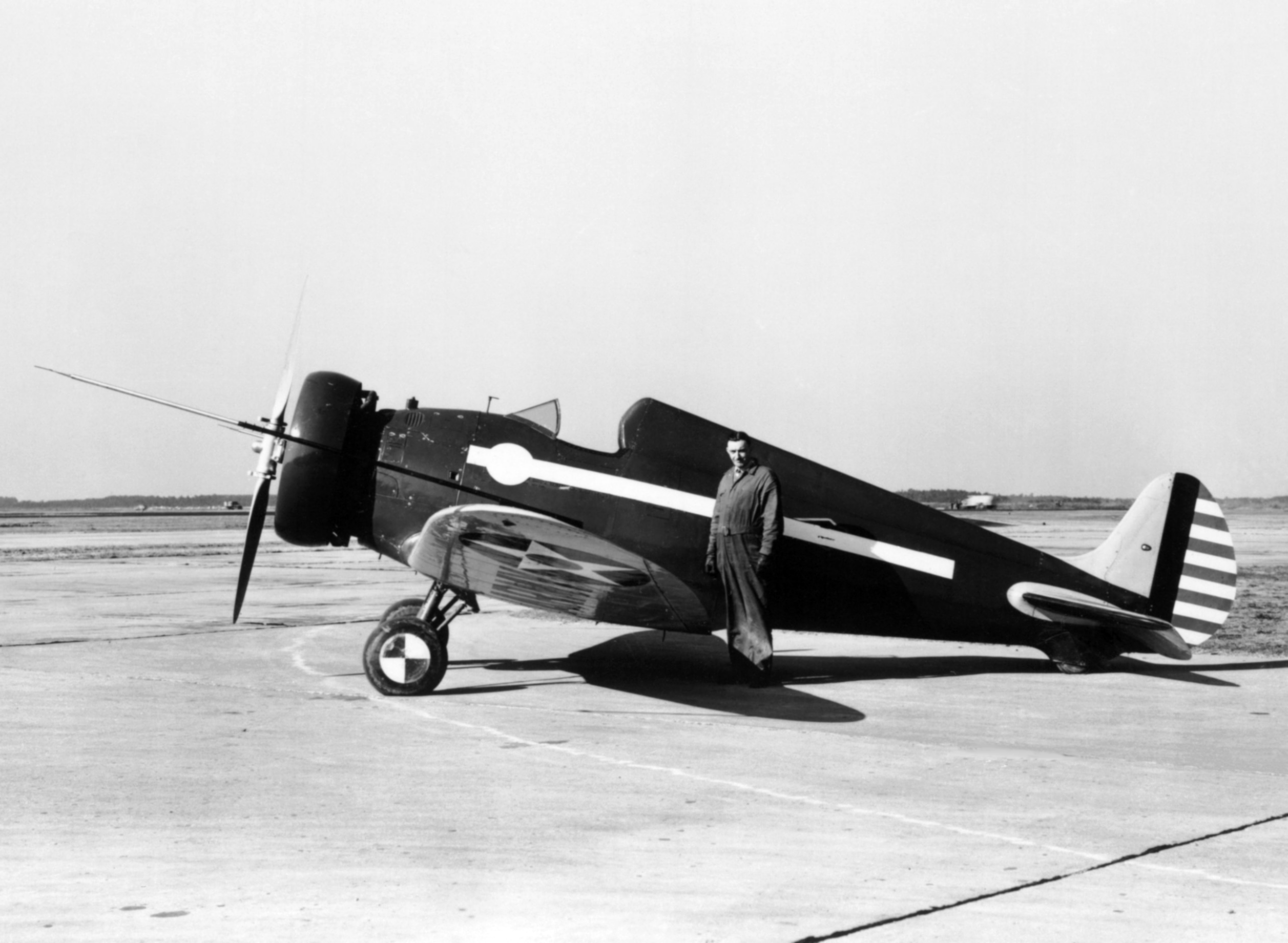
Boeing YP-29A

The airplane made its maiden flight on 20 January 1934 and was flown to Wright Field for Army testing under the experimental military designation XP-940 five days later. During testing, the XP-940 achieved a maximum speed of 220 mph at 10,000 ft (354 km/h at 3,050 m). After testing, the XP-940 was returned to the factory in March for modifications. Due to the tight-fitting canopy and restricted pilot vision from the cockpit enclosure, Boeing reverted to an open cockpit design, retaining the long headrest all the way to the tail. The engine was replaced by a 600 hp (450 kW) R-1340-35 with a drag ring, similar to the P-26A's. It was also fitted with flaps, which the XP-940 lacked.

Upon completion of testing of the XP-940, the Army decided on 29 June 1934 to purchase it and two sister ships. The designation P-29 was assigned. After the modified XP-940 was returned to the Army in April 1934, it was assigned the designation YP-29A (serial number 34-24). It eventually was redesignated the P-29A after an engine change to an R-1340-27 in place of the -35.

The cleaner design of the P-29A resulted in a speed increase of 16 mph over the P-26A, but its greater weight cut down on the aircraft's ceiling and maneuverability. Consequently, the Army cancelled an intended P-29A order. The three prototypes were subsequently used strictly for experimental purposes.

The second prototype was completed with a large and roomy glasshouse enclosure around the cockpit and, in addition, the tailwheel was housed in a different fairing. Other changes included an R-1340-35 enclosed in an anti-drag ring. The aircraft was delivered to the Army on 4 September 1934 under the designation YP-29 with serial number 34-23.

Despite its earlier Army designation and serial number, it was actually the second Model 264 to fly. During tests, the following data was obtained: Weights were 2509 lbs. empty, 3518 lbs. gross. Maximum speed was 244 mph at 10,000 ft. Initial climb was 1,600 ft per minute. Service ceiling was 26,000 ft, and absolute ceiling was 26,700 ft. Range was 800 miles.

This new cockpit enclosure satisfied the requirement for pilot protection at 250 mph operating speeds. Nevertheless, the landing speed of the YP-29 was considered too high for Army operational use and the YP-29 was returned to the factory for the installation of wing flaps. Following service testing by the Army and Boeing, which included trials with controllable pitch propellers, the service test designation was dropped and changed to P-29 after the engine was changed to a Pratt & Whitney R-1340-39.

The third Model 264 was completed as the YP-29B with an open cockpit configuration similar to that of the YP-29A. The serial number was 34-25. The only outward differences between it and the YP-29A were the addition of a one-piece wing flap similar to that of the YP-29, an additional one degree of dihedral in the wing, and an oleo tail wheel assembly similar to that of the YP-29. The YP-29B was sent to Chanute Field in Illinois for service testing. It was eventually redesignated P-29B, adding to the bewildering succession of designations for essentially the same model.

An additional variant with a 700 hp (520 kW) R-1535 (civil Twin Wasp Junior) was proposed, as the XP-32, but was never constructed.

Flying for the first time in September 1933, the XF7B-1 (BuNo 9378) was the first monoplane fighter to be tested by the U.S. Navy, although concerns over its high landing speed rendered it unsuitable for carrier operations.

All the P-29 and XF7B-1 aircraft were ultimately scrapped.

== Specifications (XF7B-1) ==
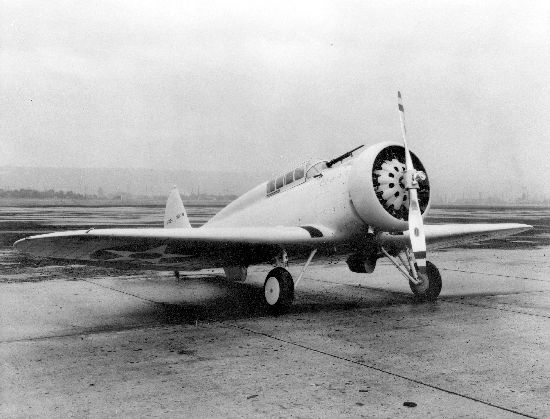
XF7B-1 prior to modifications to an open cockpit c. 1933

Data from Boeing Aircraft since 1916

General characteristics

- Crew: 1
- Length: 22 ft 7 in (6.88 m)
- Wingspan: 31 ft 11 in (9.73 m)
- Height: 7 ft 5 in (2.26 m)
- Wing area: 213 sq ft (19.8 m^{2})
- Empty weight: 2,782 lb (1,262 kg)
- Gross weight: 3,651 lb (1,656 kg)
- Powerplant: 1 × Pratt & Whitney R-1340-30 Wasp 9-cylinder air-cooled radial piston engine, 550 hp (410 kW)
- Propellers: 2-bladed variable-pitch propeller

Performance

- Maximum speed: 233 mph (375 km/h, 202 kn)
- Cruise speed: 200 mph (320 km/h, 170 kn)
- Range: 750 mi (1,210 km, 650 nmi)
- Service ceiling: 29,200 ft (8,900 m)

Armament

- Guns: 2× .30 in (7.62 mm) machine guns

== See also ==
Related development

- Boeing P-26

Aircraft of comparable role, configuration, and era

- Mitsubishi A5M
- Polikarpov I-16
- Brewster F2A Buffalo

Related lists

- List of fighter aircraft
- List of military aircraft of the United States
