= Consolidated XB2Y =

XB2Y
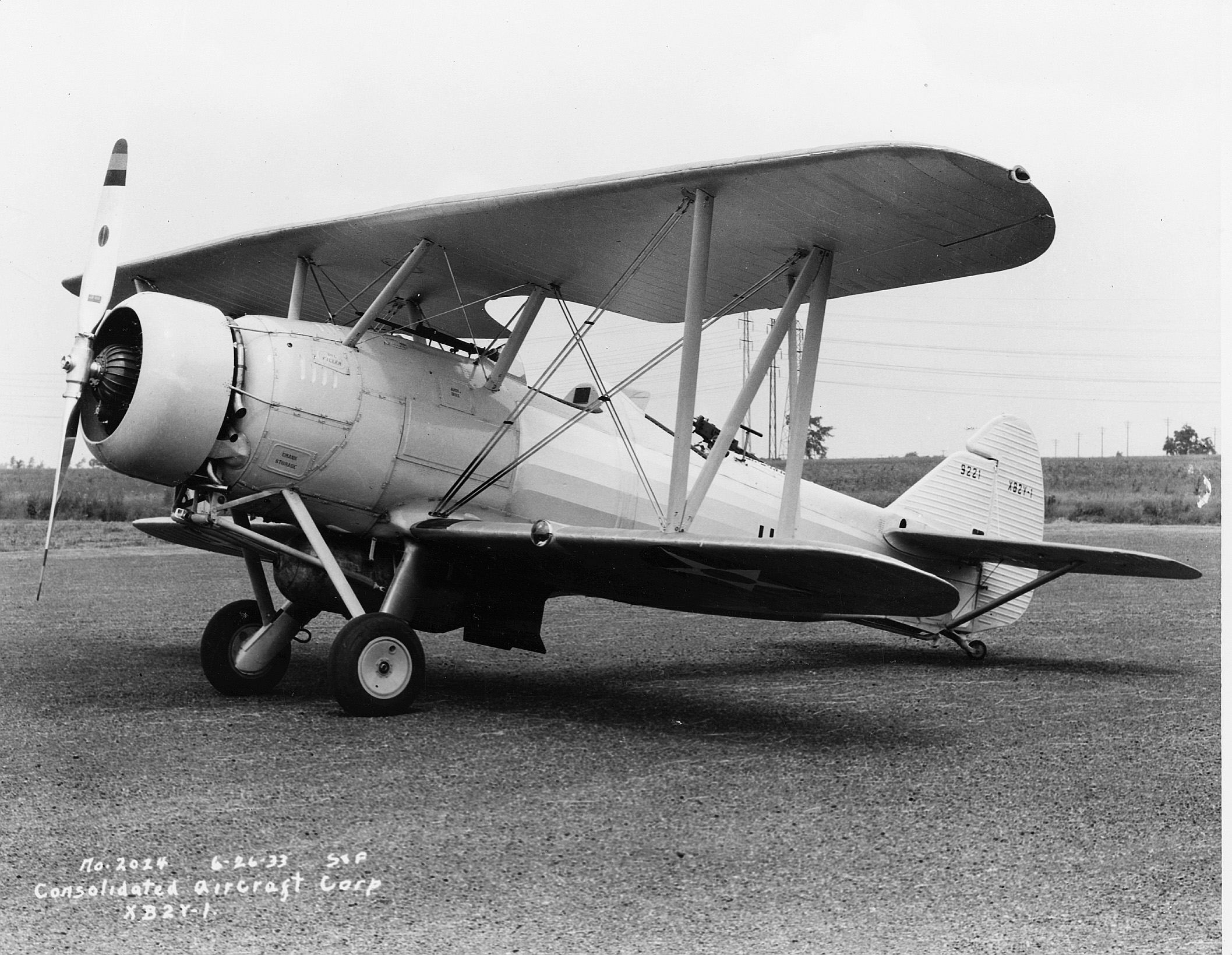

General information
- Type: Dive bomber
- National origin: United States of America
- Manufacturer: Consolidated Aircraft
- Primary user: United States Navy
- Number built: 1

History
- First flight: 1933

The Consolidated XB2Y was an American prototype single-engined dive bomber of the 1930s. It was intended to meet a United States Navy requirement for a carrier-based dive bomber, but was unsuccessful, only a single example being built.

== Design and development ==
In 1932, the United States Navy issued a specification for a two-seat carrier-based dive bomber capable of carrying a 1,000 lb (450 kg) bomb. Orders were placed for competing prototypes of designs to meet the Navy's requirement with Consolidated Aircraft and the Great Lakes Aircraft Company in June 1932.

Consolidated's proposal was the Model 24 (or XB2Y in the US Navy's designation system), a single-bay biplane developed from a basic design prepared by the Navy's Bureau of Aeronautics with detailed design led by Consolidated's B Douglas Thomas, formerly Chief Designer of Thomas Morse Aircraft, which had become part of Consolidated Aircraft in 1929.

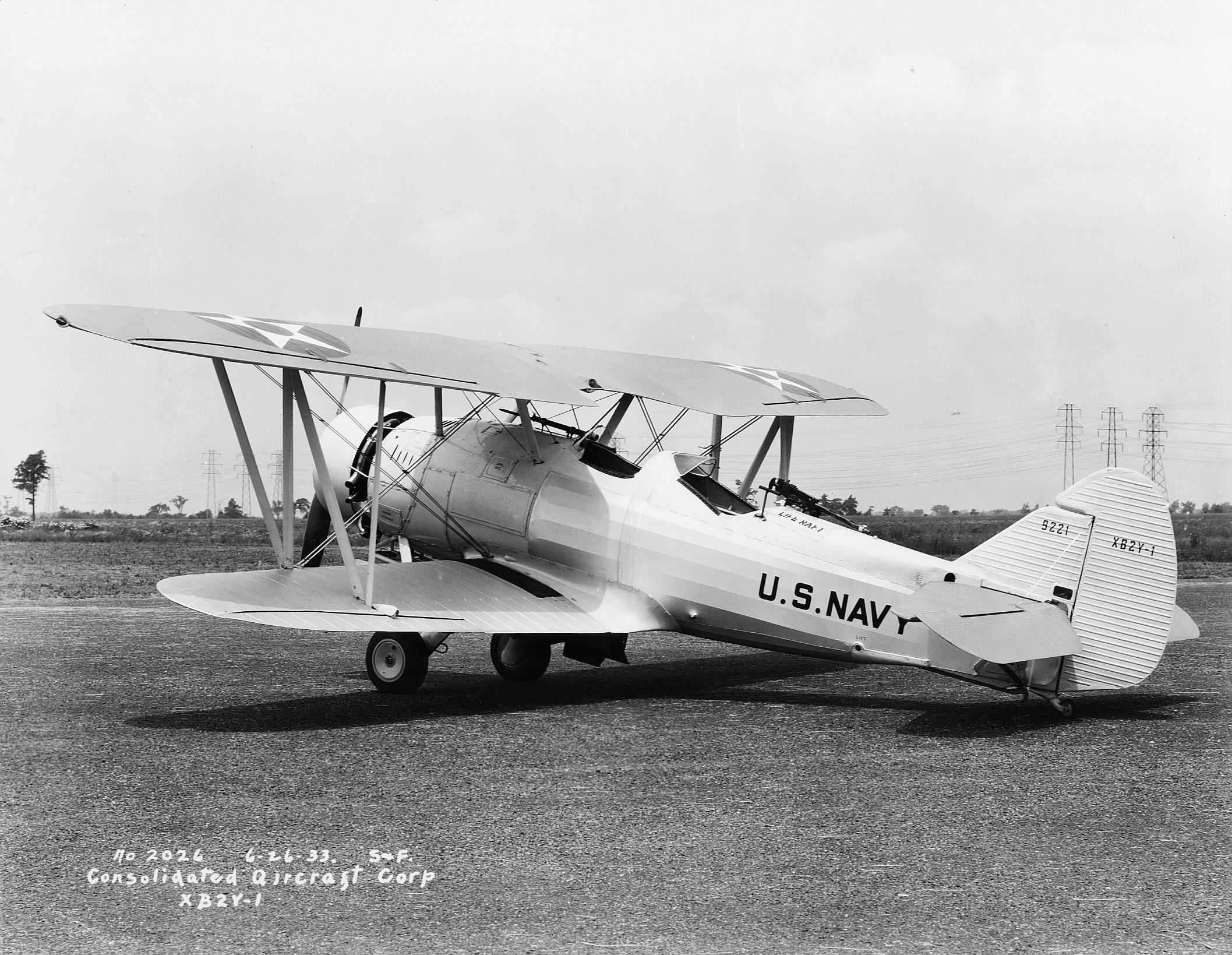

In order to withstand the high g-forces experienced during pullup after a dive attack, much of the aircraft's center-section was cut from a solid steel block. It was powered by a similar Pratt & Whitney R-1535 Twin Wasp Junior air-cooled radial engine as used by the Great Lakes design, and had a fixed tailwheel undercarriage. The crew of two sat in tandem in separate cockpits, with the observer in the rear cockpit armed with a single flexibly mounted machine gun, and the pilot with a single fixed synchronized machine gun firing through the aircraft's propeller arc. Its bombload was carried on a crutch under the fuselage that swung down to ensure the bomb would clear the propeller when dropped in a steep dive.

== Operational history ==
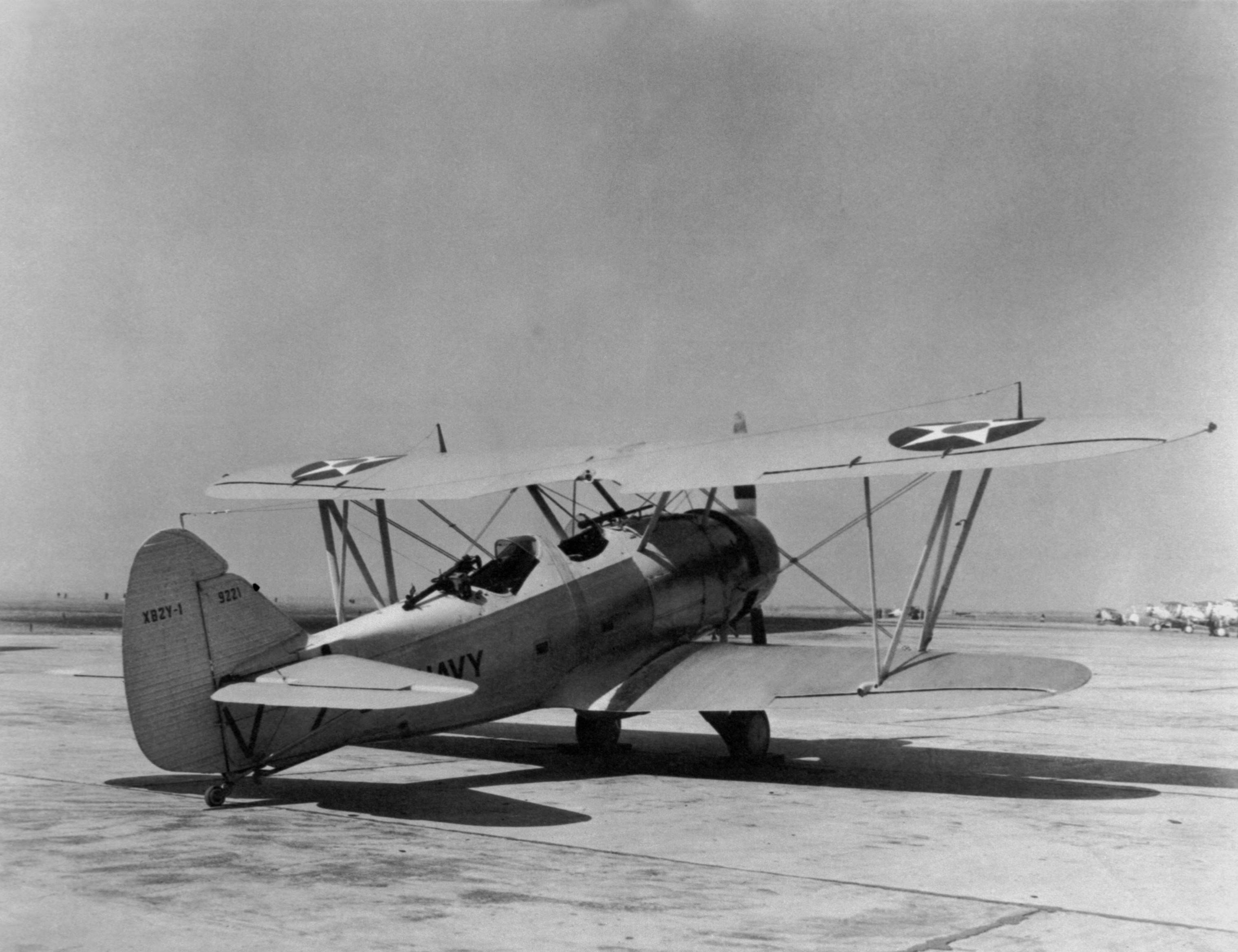

The prototype XB2Y-1 (serial number 9221) was completed in 1933, being delivered on 28 June 1933. Testing was unsuccessful, with the aircraft's performance being unsatisfactory, while the aircraft also proved very expensive to build. The US Navy preferred the Great Lakes design, with 60 being ordered as BG-1s.

The XB2Y-1 was modified to a scout configuration, removing the bomb crutch. This allowed it to reach a height of 23,400 ft (7,100 m), and it was used by NACA at Langley, Virginia for pilot view tests.

== Specifications (XB2Y-1) ==
Data from General Dynamics Aircraft and their Predecessors

General characteristics

- Crew: two
- Length: 27 ft 11 in (8.51 m)
- Wingspan: 36 ft 6 in (11.13 m)
- Height: 10 ft 10 in (3.30 m)
- Wing area: 362 sq ft (33.6 m^{2})
- Empty weight: 3,538 lb (1,605 kg)
- Gross weight: 6,255 lb (2,837 kg)
- Powerplant: 1 × Pratt & Whitney XR-1535-64 14-cylinder air-cooled radial engine, 700 hp (520 kW)

Performance

- Maximum speed: 158 kn (182 mph, 293 km/h) at 8,900 ft (2,700 m)
- Range: 423 nmi (487 mi, 784 km)
- Service ceiling: 22,800 ft (6,900 m)
- Time to altitude: 10 minutes to 12,200 ft (3,700 m)

Armament

- Guns: 1 × fixed, forward-firing .30 in (7.62 mm) machine gun; 1 × flexible .30 in machine gun
- Bombs: 1 × 1,000 lb (450 kg)

== See also ==
Aircraft of comparable role, configuration, and era

- Great Lakes BG
- Vought SBU Corsair

Related lists

- List of United States Navy aircraft designations (pre-1962)
