= Northrop XFT =

1930s US Navy prototype fighter aircraft

XFT
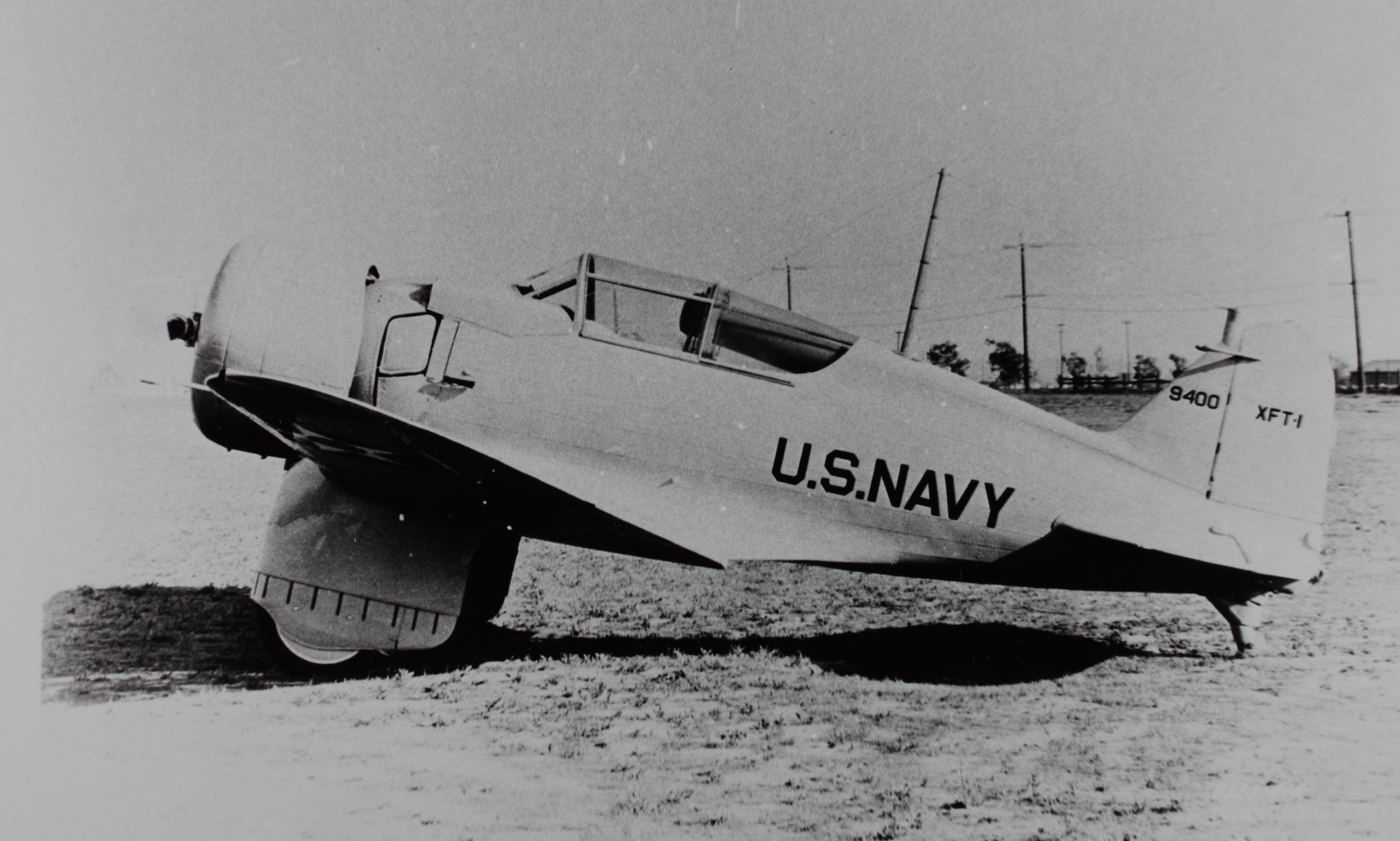
- The XFT-1

General information
- Type: Fighter
- Manufacturer: Northrop Corporation
- Number built: 1

History
- First flight: 18 December 1933 at Los Angeles
- Developed from: Northrop Delta
- Developed into: Vought V-141

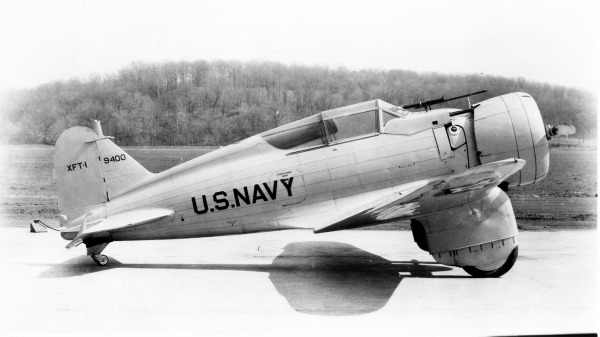
XFT-1 side view

The Northrop XFT was an American prototype fighter aircraft of the 1930s. A single engined low-winged monoplane, it was designed and built to meet a United States Navy order for an advanced carrier based fighter. It exhibited poor handling, and was rejected by the Navy, the single prototype being lost in a crash. A variant, the Northrop 3A, also was unsuccessful.

== Development and design ==
In the early 1930s, the United States Navy was interested in investigating the use of modern, monoplanes as fighter aircraft to replace the biplanes that equipped its fighter squadrons. In December 1932, it ordered the XF7B from Boeing, and based on the impressive performance of Northrop's Gamma and Delta, both stressed skin monoplanes, placed an order with Northrop on May 8, 1933 for a single prototype fighter, designated XFT-1.

The resulting aircraft, which was designed by a team led by Ed Heinemann resembled a scaled-down Northrop Delta. It was a low-winged monoplane, of all-metal stressed skin construction. It had a fixed tailwheel undercarriage with its main gear fitted with streamlining trouser fairings. The pilot sat in an enclosed cockpit with a sliding canopy. It was powered by a single Wright R-1510 radial engine.

The XFT-1 first flew on January 16, 1934, being delivered to NAS Anacostia for evaluation by the Navy. While it was the fastest fighter yet tested by the U.S. Navy, its handling characteristics were poor. Although it was fitted with flaps to lower its landing speed, it was difficult to control at low speeds, and had poor forward visibility, major problems for an aircraft intended to operate off aircraft carriers. Its most serious problem, however, was its behavior when spinning, where the tail was subject to severe buffeting. In February 1934, test pilot Vance Breese landed the prototype XFT-1 without authorization at Glendale California at a Curtiss Wright Technical Institute location, and pictures of the XFT-1 were leaked to Janes AWA. It was fitted with a more powerful R-1510 engine in August 1934, but this did not improve performance, and it was returned to Northrop for more major modifications, being fitted with larger tail surfaces and a Pratt & Whitney R-1535 Twin Wasp Junior radial engine, being redesignated XFT-2.

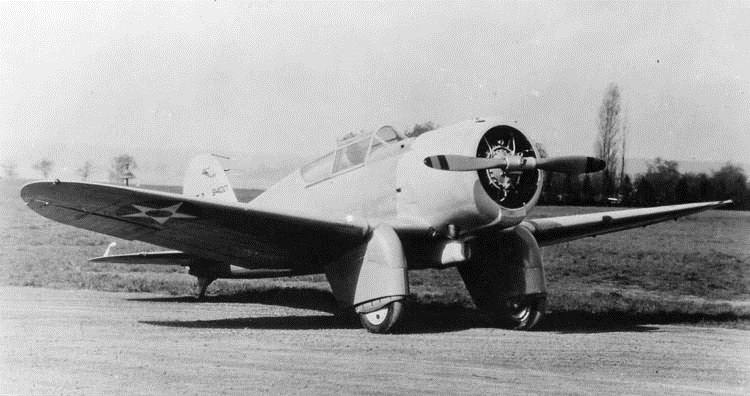
The XFT-2

The XFT-2 was redelivered to Anacostia in April 1936, where it was found that while its performance had only slightly improved, its handling was even poorer than before, and it was rejected by the U.S. Navy as unairworthy. It was ordered to be returned to Northrop, and ignoring instructions to ship the aircraft back to Northrop's El Segundo factory, a test pilot attempted to fly the XFT-2 back to California, the aircraft entering a spin and crashing when crossing the Allegheny Mountains on July 21, 1936.

The design formed the basis of the Northrop 3A, almost identical to the XFT except for a retractable undercarriage, which first flew in 1935. It was another failure, having a tendency for unintentional spins. After the 3A and its test pilot, Lieutenant Frank Scare, disappeared without trace on a flight over the Pacific Ocean off California on 30 July 1935, Northrop abandoned the 3A project and sold its blueprints to Chance Vought Aviation, where it became the Vought V-141.

== Variants ==
XFT-1
Initial prototype of this naval fighter powered by a Wright Whirlwind radial.
XFT-2
redesignated as the XFT-2 after some major modifications and fitting of a Pratt & Whitney R-1535 Twin Wasp Junior.
Northrop 3A
Further development of the FT as a land-based fighter, almost identical to the XFT except for retractable undercarriage.
Vought V-143
Development by Vought after the purchase of the Northrop 3A design.
Vought V-150
The V-143 fitted with a 525 hp (391 kW) R-1535.
Vought AXV
Imperial Japanese Navy Air Service designation of the V-143 evaluated in Japan.

== Specifications (XFT-1) ==
Data from McDonnell Douglas Aircraft since 1920

General characteristics

- Crew: one
- Length: 21 ft 11 in (6.68 m)
- Wingspan: 32 ft 0 in (9.75 m)
- Height: 9 ft 5 in (2.87 m)
- Wing area: 177 sq ft (16.4 m^{2})
- Empty weight: 2,489 lb (1,120 kg)
- Gross weight: 3,756 lb (1,704 kg)
- Max takeoff weight: 4,003 lb (1,816 kg)
- Powerplant: 1 × Wright R-1510-26 14-cylinder air cooled radial engine, 625 hp (466 kW)

Performance

- Maximum speed: 235 mph (378 km/h, 204 kn) at 6,000 ft (1,380 m)
- Range: 976 mi (1,570 km, 849 nmi)
- Service ceiling: 26,500 ft (8,075 m)
- Climb to 6,000 ft (1,830 m): 2.6 minutes

Armament

- Guns: 2 × .30 in (7.62 mm) M1919 Browning machine guns
- Bombs: 2 × 116 lb (53 kg) bombs

== See also ==
Related development

- Northrop Delta
- Vought V-141

Aircraft of comparable role, configuration, and era

- Boeing XF7B
