= Great Lakes BG =

US carrier-based dive bomber

BG
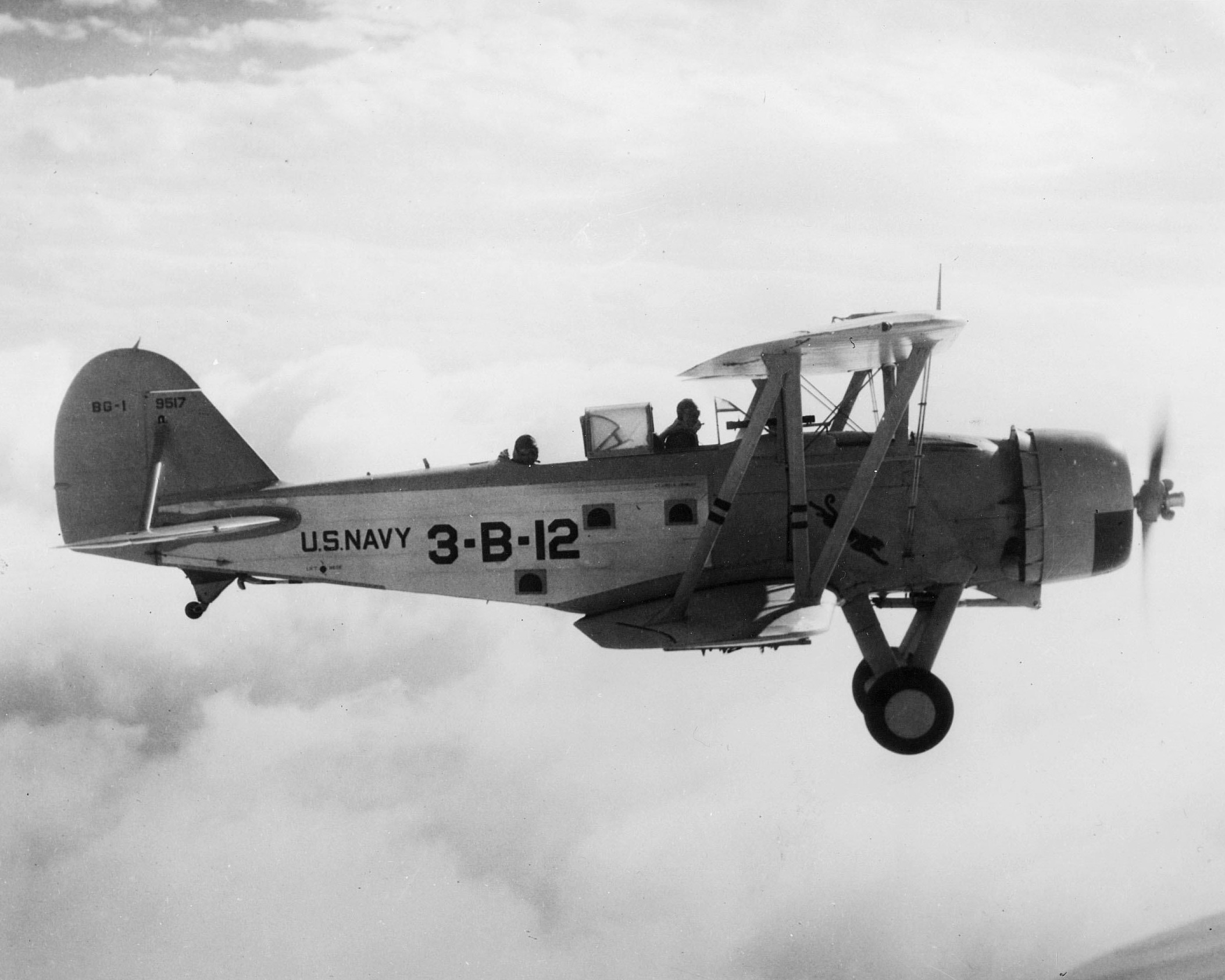
- Great Lakes BG-1 of bombing squadron VB-3B

General information
- Type: Dive-bomber
- Manufacturer: Great Lakes Aircraft Company
- Primary users: United States Navy United States Marine Corps
- Number built: 61

History
- Introduction date: 1934
- First flight: 1933
- Retired: 1941

The Great Lakes BG was an American carrier-based dive bomber of the 1930s. Designed and built by the Great Lakes Aircraft Company of Cleveland, Ohio, 61 were used by the United States Navy and United States Marine Corps from 1934 to 1940.

== Development and design ==
The Great Lakes Aircraft Company, who had previously built 18 TG-1 and 32 TG-2 variants of the Martin T4M, received an order from the U.S. Navy for a prototype two seat dive bomber capable of carrying a 1,000 lb (454 kg) bomb in 1933. (This compared with contemporary Scout Bombers such as the Vought SBU and the Curtiss SBC Helldiver, also capable of dive bombing, which had bombloads of 500 lb (227 kg)).

The resulting design was a single engined biplane with single bay, unequal span tapered wings and a fixed tailwheel undercarriage. The aircraft was powered by a 750 hp (560 kW) Pratt & Whitney Twin Wasp Junior radial engine.

The prototype XBG-1 was completed in mid-1933 and evaluated against the competing Consolidated XB2Y-1, proving superior. As a result, in November 1933, orders were placed for production of the aircraft as the BG-1, which was fitted with a canopy over the cockpits for the two crew, in place of the open cockpits of the prototype. A total of 61 of these aircraft were built, including the prototype.

== Operational history ==
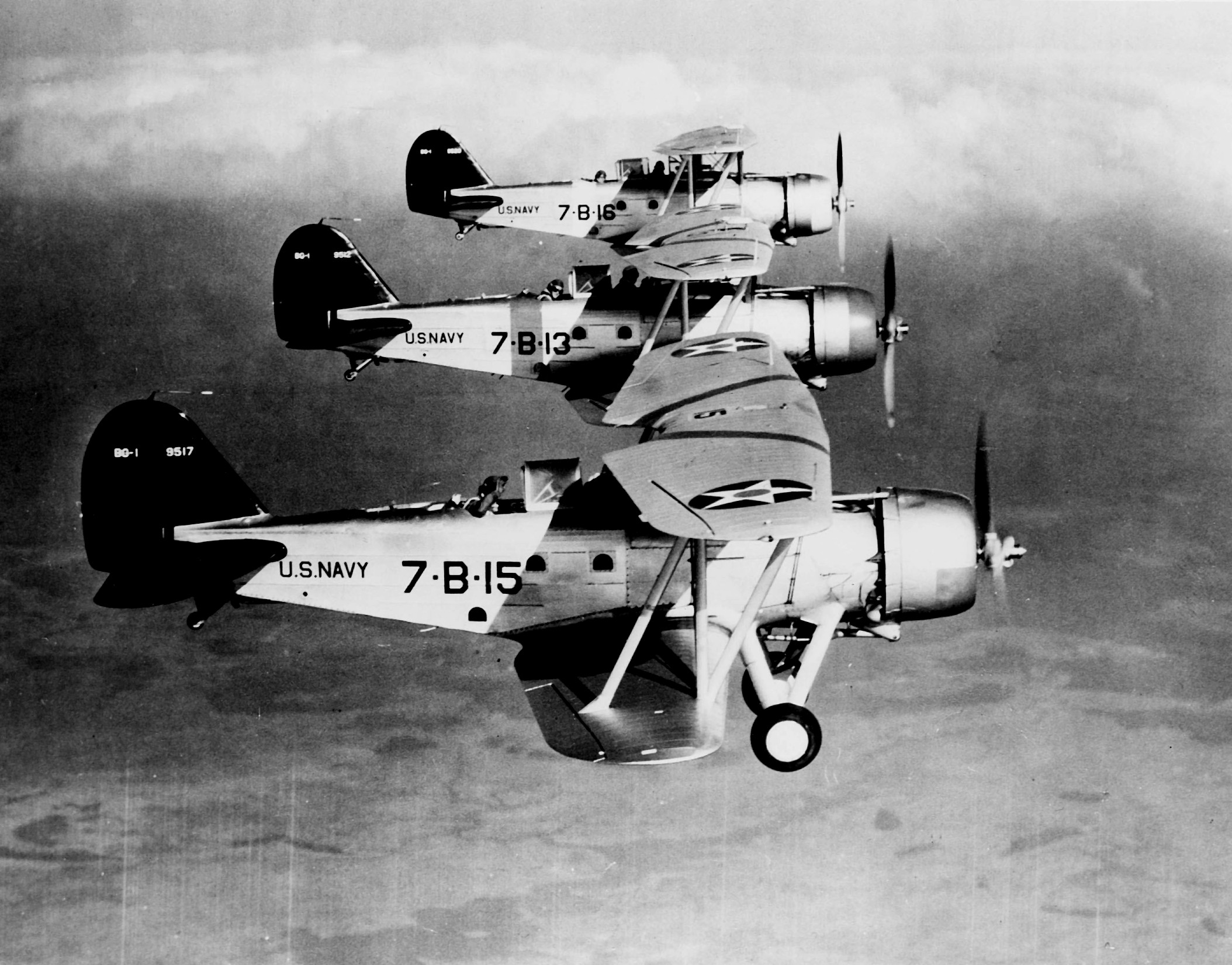
BG-1s of VB-7

The BG-1 entered service in October 1934, equipping VB-3B (later re-designated VB-4) aboard the carriers Ranger and Lexington. It was also operated by the Marine Corps, equipping two squadrons from 1935.

The BG-1 continued in front line use with the Navy until 1938, and with the Marines Corps until 1940. It was used for utility duties at shore bases until June 1941. About 22 were converted to target drones for naval anti-aircraft gunnery, with one being used to test TV-guidance for air-to surface missiles, and was successfully guided by signals from a Beechcraft JRB to hit a target raft on Chesapeake Bay on 19 April 1942.

== Variants ==
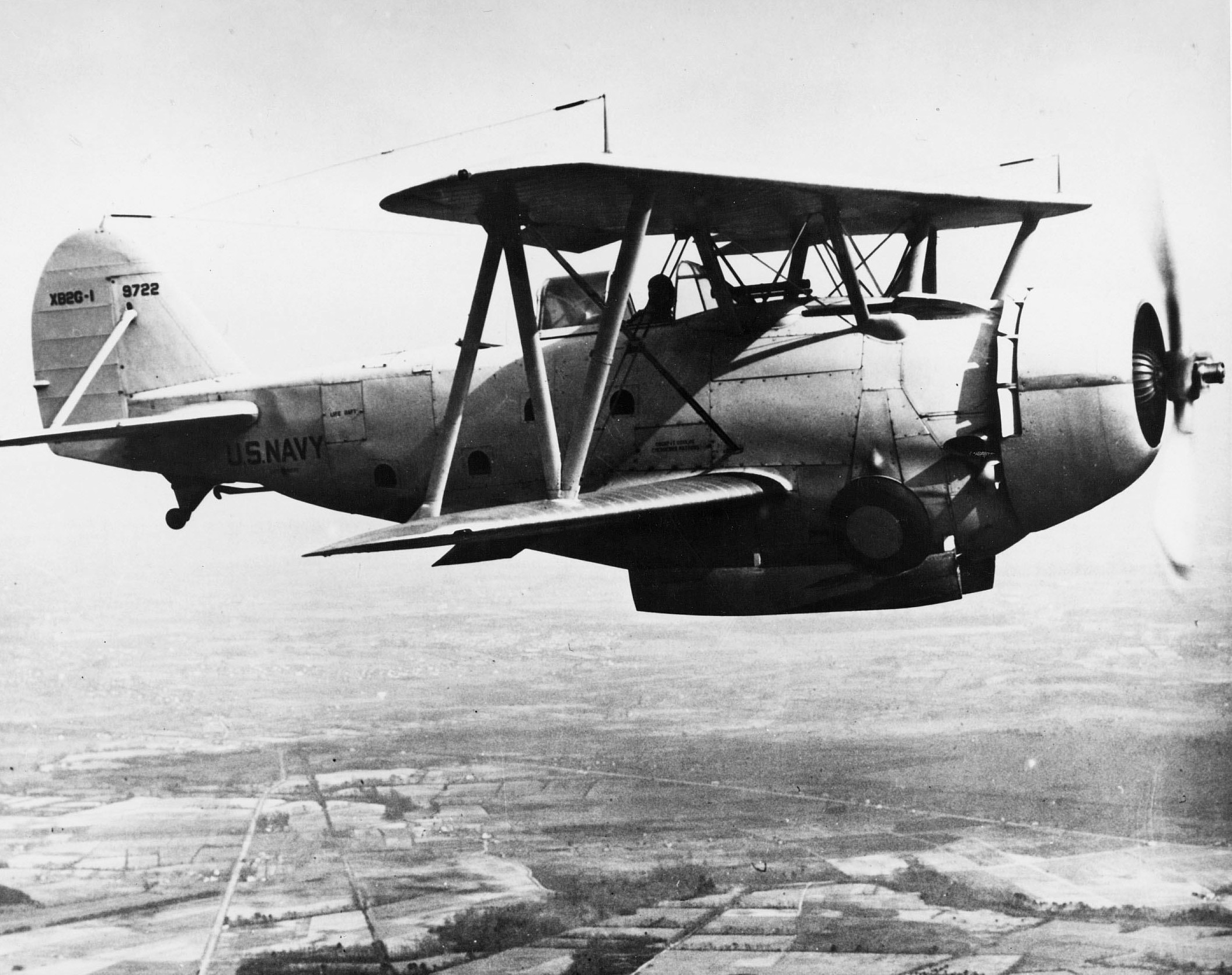
The XB2G-1 with a retractable landing gear, 1936.

XBG-1
Prototype. Open cockpit and powered by a Pratt & Whitney R-1535-64 radial engine, one built.
BG-1
Production version with enclosed cockpit and powered by a Pratt & Whitney R-1535-82 radial engine, 60 built.
XB2G-1
Developed version with retractable undercarriage and an enclosed bomb bay. One prototype only.

== Operators ==
United States

- United States Marine Corps
  - VB-4M / VMB-2 - March 1935 to December 1940
  - VB-6M / VMB-1 - October 1935 to October 1940
  - VMO-1 - September 1940 to May 1941
  - VMS-1 - December 1938 to June 1941
  - VMS-2 - December 1940 to April 1941
- United States Navy
  - VB-3B / VB-4 - November 1934 to June 1939
  - VB-7 - July 1939 to August 1940

== Specifications (BG-1) ==
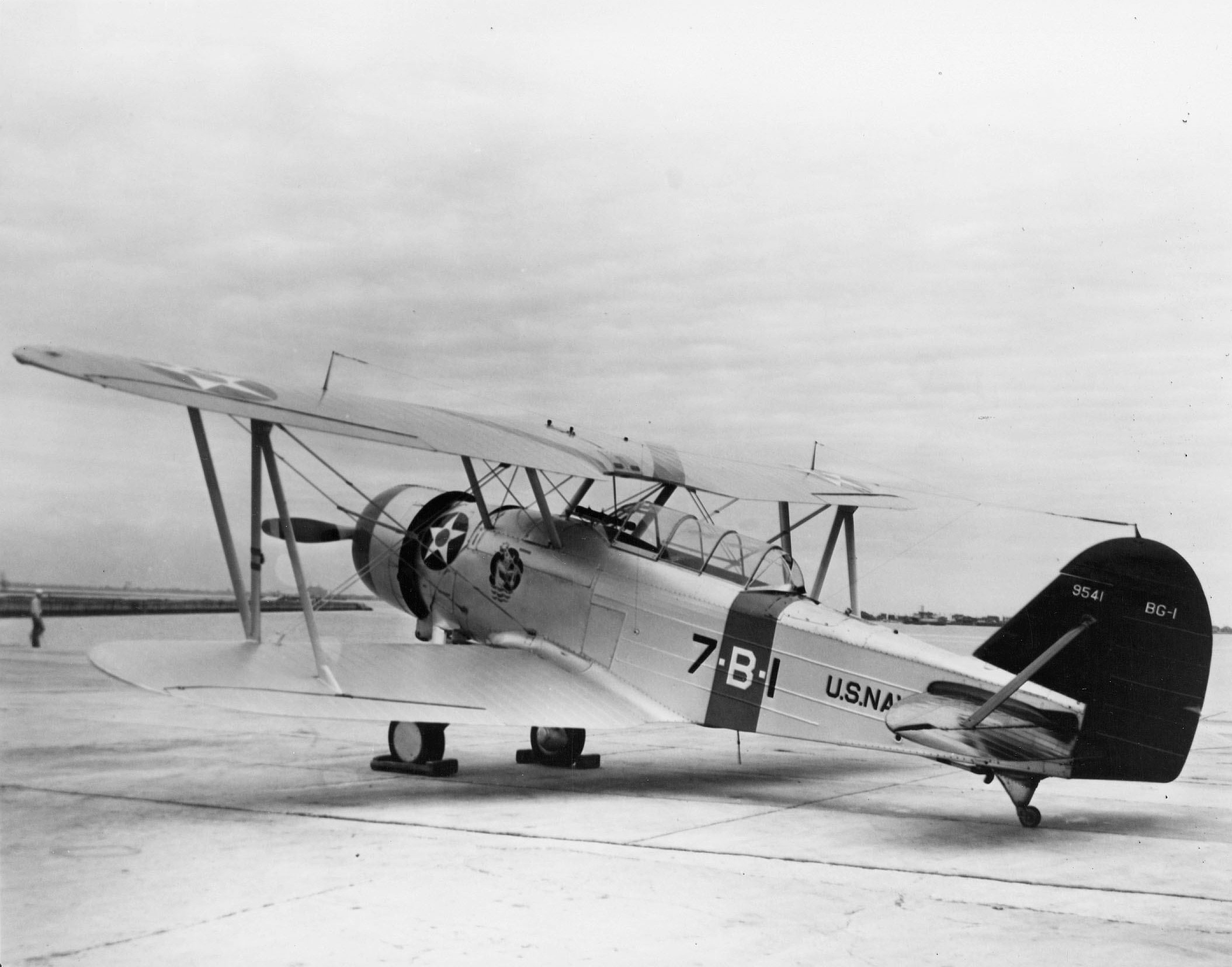
BG-1, showing the single bay wings

Data from United States Navy Aircraft since 1914

General characteristics

- Crew: Two
- Length: 28 ft 9 in (8.77 m)
- Wingspan: 36 ft 0 in (10.98 m)
- Height: 11 ft 0 in (3.35 m)
- Wing area: 384 sq ft (35.7 m^{2})
- Empty weight: 3,903 lb (1,774 kg)
- Gross weight: 6,347 lb (2,885 kg)
- Powerplant: 1 × Pratt & Whitney R-1535-82 Twin Wasp Junior 14-cylinder, two row air cooled radial engine, 750 hp (560 kW)

Performance

- Maximum speed: 188 mph (303 km/h, 163 kn)
- Range: 549 mi (884 km, 477 nmi)
- Service ceiling: 20,100 ft (6,100 m)
- Wing loading: 16.5 lb/sq ft (80.8 kg/m^{2})
- Power/mass: 0.12 hp/lb (190 W/kg)
- Climb to 5,000 ft (1,520 m): 5.5 min.

Armament

- Guns: 1 × fixed forward firing 0.30 in (7.62 mm) M1919 Browning machine gun and 1 × flexibly mounted rear gun
- Bombs: 1 × 1,000 lb (454 kg) bomb under fuselage

== See also ==
Aircraft of comparable role, configuration, and era

- Vought SBU
- Curtiss SBC
- Aichi D1A
- Fokker C.X Series II - IV

Related lists

- List of United States Navy aircraft designations (pre-1962)
