= Boeing XF6B =

1933 prototype fighter-bomber aircraft model by Boeing

XF6B
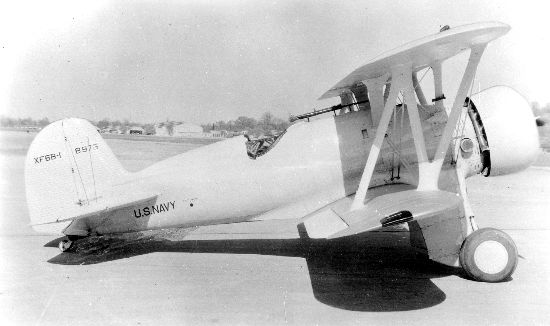
- The XF6B-1 in the early 1930s

General information
- Type: Carrier-based fighter-bomber
- National origin: United States
- Manufacturer: Boeing
- Status: Cancelled
- Number built: 1

History
- First flight: 1 February 1933
- Developed from: Boeing F4B

The Boeing XF6B-1 / XBFB-1 was Boeing's last biplane design for the United States Navy. Only the one prototype, Model 236, was ever built; although first flying in early 1933, it rammed into a crash barrier in 1936 and the design was not pursued further.

== Design and development ==
Ordered by the U.S. Navy on 30 June 1931, the fighter aircraft was a derivative of the Boeing F4B; it was almost entirely of metal construction, with only the wings still fabric-covered. The aircraft was powered by a 625 hp Pratt & Whitney R-1535-44 Twin Wasp engine.

The intended role of this design turned out to be uncertain. While its rugged construction was capable of withstanding high g-forces, it weighed in at 3,704 pounds (700 pounds more than the F4B), and did not have the maneuverability needed in a fighter aircraft. It was, however, suitable as a fighter-bomber, and in March 1934 the prototype was redesignated XBFB-1 in recognition of its qualities. Even so, various ideas were tried to improve its fighter qualifications, such as an improved engine cowling, streamlining around the landing gear, and even a three-bladed propeller (two-bladed props being standard).

== Operational history ==
Performance of the Boeing XF6B remained unsatisfactory with the U.S. Navy instead opting for the Curtiss F11C Goshawk.

== Operators ==
United States

- United States Navy

== Specifications ==
Data from Angelucci, 1987. pp. 85-86.

General characteristics

- Crew: one
- Length: 22 ft 1.5 in (6.73 m)
- Wingspan: 28 ft 6 in (8.68 m)
- Height: 10 ft 7 in (3.22 m)
- Wing area: 252 sq ft (23.41 m^{2})
- Empty weight: 2,823 lb (1,281 kg)
- Gross weight: 3,704 lb (1,680 kg)
- Powerplant: 1 × Pratt & Whitney R-1535-44 , 625 hp (466 kW)

Performance

- Maximum speed: 200 mph (322 km/h, 170 kn)
- Cruise speed: 170 mph (274 km/h, 150 kn)
- Range: 525 mi (845 km, 456 nmi)
- Rate of climb: 1,190 ft/min (6.04 m/s)

Armament

- 2x .30in machine guns
- 500lb (227kg) bombs
