= Vought SB2U Vindicator =

US Navy dive bomber

SB2U Vindicator
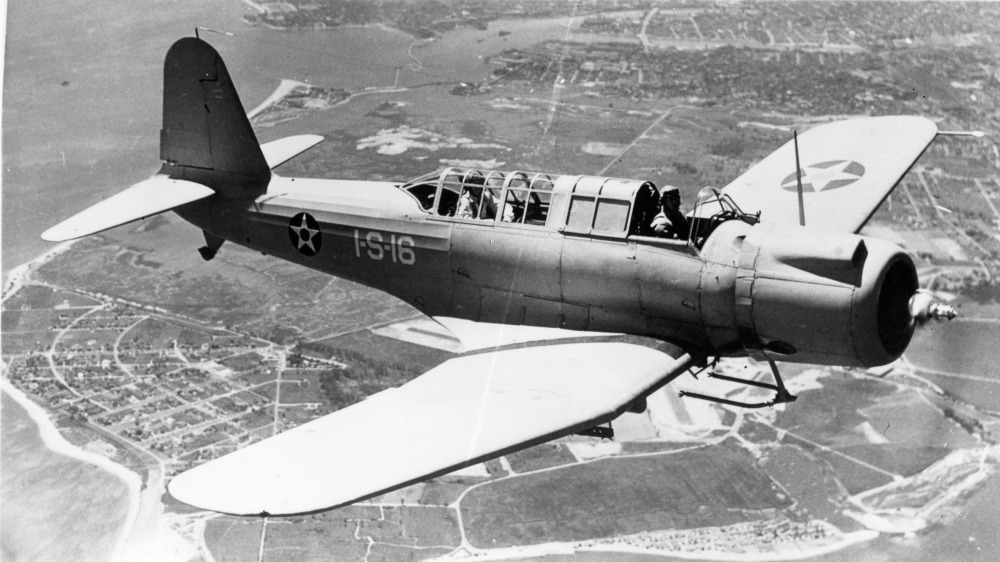

General information
- Type: Dive bomber
- National origin: United States
- Manufacturer: Vought
- Primary users: United States Navy United States Marine Corps; French Navy; Royal Navy
- Number built: 260

History
- Introduction date: 1937
- First flight: 4 January 1936
- Retired: 1945

The Vought SB2U Vindicator is an American carrier-based dive bomber developed for the United States Navy (USN) in the 1930s, the first monoplane in this role. Vindicators still remained in service at the time of the Battle of Midway, but by 1943, all had been withdrawn to training units. It was known as the Chesapeake in Royal Navy service.

== Design and development ==
In 1934, the United States Navy (USN) issued a requirement for a new Scout Bomber for carrier use, and received proposals from six manufacturers. The specification was issued in two parts, one for a monoplane, and one for a biplane. Vought submitted designs in both categories, which would become the XSB2U-1 and XSB3U-1 respectively. The biplane was considered alongside the monoplane design as a hedge against the U.S. Navy's reluctance to pursue the modern configuration.

The XSB2U-1 was of conventional low-wing monoplane configuration with a retractable conventional tailwheel landing gear, the pilot and tail gunner being seated in tandem under a long greenhouse-style canopy. The fuselage was of steel tube construction, covered with aluminum panels from the nose to the rear cockpit with a fabric-covered rear fuselage, while the folding cantilever wing was of all-metal construction. A Pratt & Whitney R-1535 Twin-Wasp Junior radial engine drove a two-blade constant-speed propeller, which was intended to act as a dive brake during a dive bombing attack. The use of propeller braking was not entirely successful, and in practice US Navy Vindicators lowered the aircraft's undercarriage to act as a speed brake and dived at shallower angles. A single 1,000 lb (450 kg) bomb could be carried on a swinging trapeze to allow it to clear the propeller in a steep dive, while further bombs could be carried under the wings to give a maximum bombload of 1,500 lb (680 kg).

The SB2U was evaluated against the Brewster XSBA-1, Curtiss XSBC-3, Great Lakes XB2G-1, Grumman XSBF-1 and Northrop XBT-1. All but the Great Lakes and Grumman submissions were ordered into production. Designated XSB2U-1, one prototype was ordered on 15 October 1934 and was delivered on 15 April 1936. Accepted for operational evaluation on 2 July 1936, the prototype XSB2U-1, BuNo 9725, crashed on 20 August 1936. Its successful completion of trials led to further orders, with 56 SB2U-1s ordered on 26 October 1936, and a further 58 of a slightly modified version, the SB2U-2, on 6 October 1938.

The SB2U-3 was a more heavily modified version, intended as a long-range scout bomber, capable of being fitted with a conventional wheeled undercarriage, for operations from aircraft carriers or land airbases, or with floats. To give the required increased range, the fuselage fuel tank fitted to the SB2U-1 and -2 was supplemented by integral wing tanks, while the aircraft's tail had an increased span. The prototype XSB2U-3, converted from the last SB2U-1, flew in February 1939, and after testing as both a landplane and floatplane, 57 SB2U-3s were ordered on 25 September 1939, mainly for the United States Marine Corps.

The SB2U is prominently featured in the 1941 film Dive Bomber.

There were 260 examples of all Vindicator variants produced, and a single surviving SB2U-2 is preserved at the National Naval Aviation Museum at NAS Pensacola, Florida.

== Operational history ==
=== U.S. Navy ===
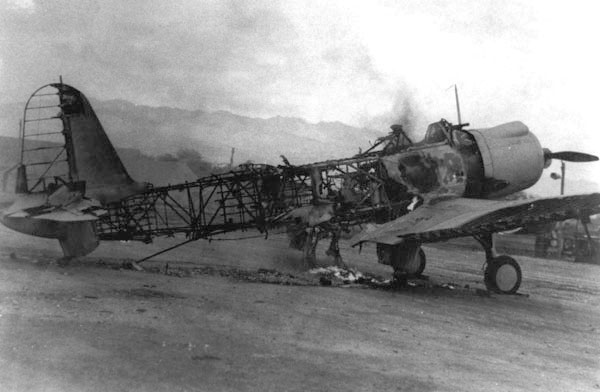
SB2U destroyed at Pearl Harbor

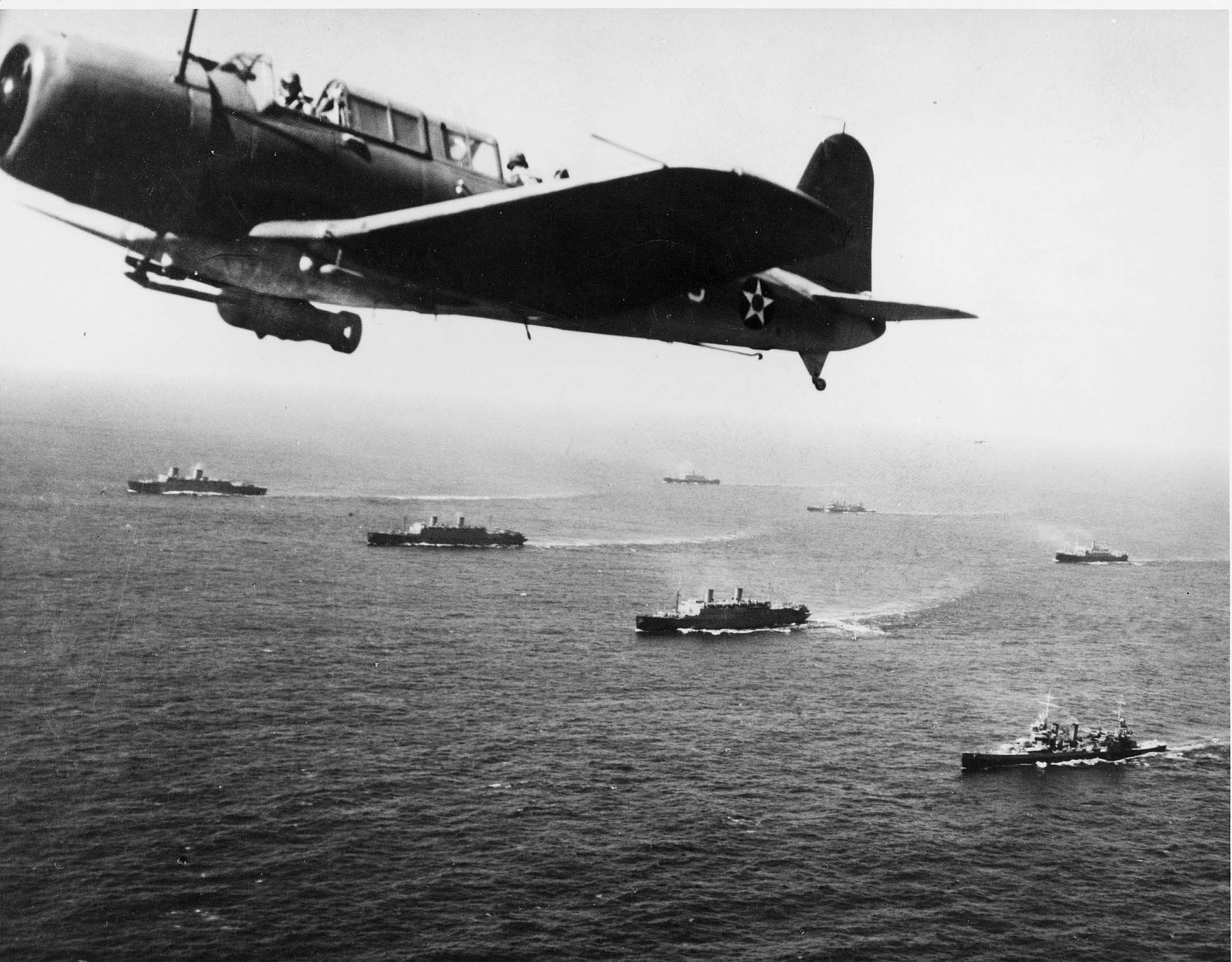
SB2U from Ranger in November 1941.

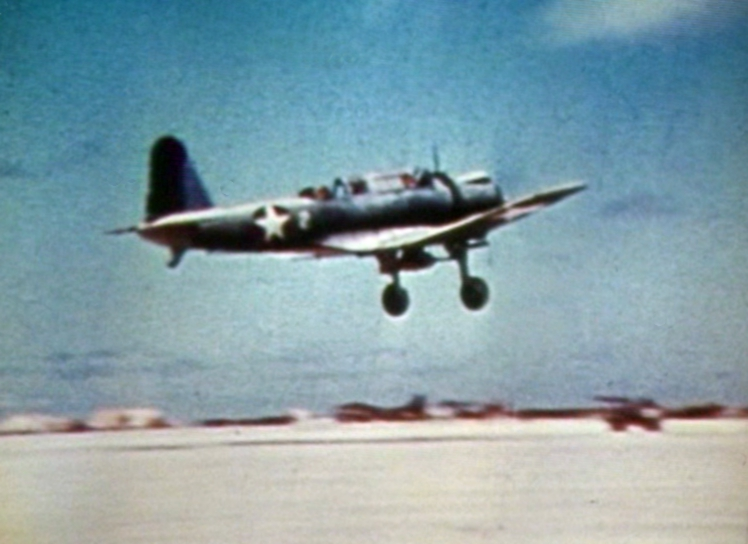
SB2U-3 of VMSB-241, MAG-21, takes off from Eastern Island shortly before the Battle of Midway.

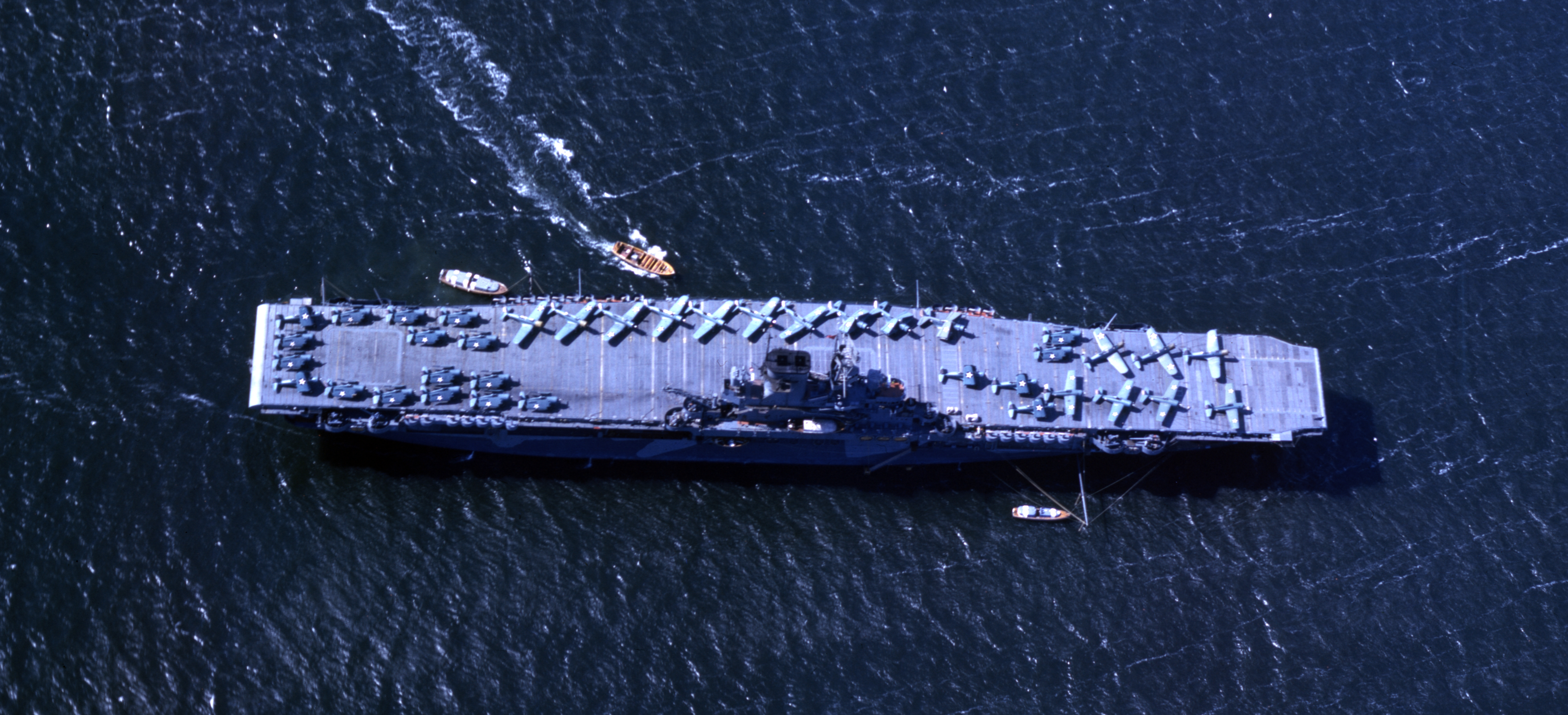
SB2U-3s on deck of Wasp in June 1942.

Deliveries to the U.S. Navy began in December 1937, when four aircraft joined VB-3 aboard the aircraft carrier Saratoga, replacing Curtiss BFC-2 biplanes. As well as Saratoga, Vindicators served on the carriers Lexington, Ranger, and Wasp. Air Group Nine, destined for Essex, trained in Vindicators aboard the escort carrier Charger, but they transitioned to the Douglas SBD Dauntless before Essex joined the war.

During the attack on Pearl Harbor, seven Vindicators from the U.S. squadron VMSB-231 were destroyed at Ewa Field.

=== U.S. Marine Corps ===
VMSB-231 and VMSB-241 were the only two USMC squadrons that fielded the Marine-specific SB2U-3 between March 1941 and September 1943. VMSB-241's Vindicators saw combat at the Battle of Midway in June 1942. Airmen with experience in more modern aircraft spoke disparagingly of SB2Us as "vibrators" or "wind indicators" in their later combat assignments. Captain Richard E. Fleming led a wing of dive bombers, including 6 SB2U-3 Vindicator in an attack on the Japanese cruiser Mikuma on 5 June 1942, but was shot down by anti-aircraft fire during the attack, for which he was posthumously awarded the Medal of Honor.

=== French Navy ===
On 22 February 1939, France placed an order for 20 V-156-Fs for the carrier-based squadrons of the Aéronautique Navale (French Naval Aviation), with an order for 20 more V-156-Fs following in May 1939. Based on the SB2U-2, the V-156-F incorporated specific French equipment, including 7.5 mm (0.30 in) Darne machine guns and French radios, while the aircraft were fitted with dive brakes, as tested and rejected by the US Navy. The aircraft were delivered to France in crates and reassembled at Orly, with the first example flying in France on 6 August 1939. On the outbreak of World War II in September 1939, the French Navy decided that its only aircraft carrier, Béarn, was too slow for operational service, and the ship's squadrons disembarked for land-based service. By mid-October 1939, the first escadrille, AB 1, had reequipped with the V-156-F, while a second escadrille, AB 3, was formed in November 1939. In March–April 1940, AB 1's pilots carried out successful deck-landing training aboard Béarn, and were declared carrier qualified.

On 10 May 1940, on the opening day of the German invasion of France, all 12 of AB 3's aircraft were destroyed in a German air raid on Boulogne airfield. AB 1 was ordered up to northern France from Hyères as a replacement. AB 1 sustained heavy losses while attacking bridges and German ground targets in northern France, including seven aircraft shot down by Messerschmitt Bf 109s during an attack on a bridge over the Sambre–Oise Canal on 20 May 1940. Later that month, AB 1 provided air cover for the Evacuation of Dunkirk. AB 3, which had had its losses replaced by V-156-Fs taken out of storage, was deployed against the Italians following the Italian invasion of France on 10 June and on 14 June, four V-156s attacked the Italian submarine Gondar, which was unharmed. By the time of the Armistice, there were only a handful of remaining Voughts in French hands, and the type was phased out of service.

=== Royal Navy ===
France had placed an order for a further 50 V-156-Fs in March 1940, with delivery planned from March 1941. Following the defeat of France, this order was taken over by the British government for use by the Royal Navy's Fleet Air Arm, who named the aircraft the Chesapeake. The British required several modifications to the Chesapeake, including the additional fuel tank fitted to the SB2U-3, additional armor and heavier forward firing armament, with four rifle caliber machine guns replacing the single forward-firing Darne machine gun of the French aircraft. Fourteen Chesapeakes were used to equip a reformed 811 Naval Air Squadron on 14 July 1941 at RNAS Lee-on-Solent. The squadron, whose crews referred to the aircraft as the "cheesecake", intended to use them for anti-submarine patrols, and they were earmarked for the escort carrier HMS Archer.

By the end of October that year, it had been decided that the Chesapeakes were underpowered for the planned duties and would not be able to lift a useful payload from the small escort carriers. Accordingly, they were withdrawn from 811 Squadron in November 1941 for use as training aircraft and the unit was re-equipped with the biplane Fairey Swordfish.

== Variants ==
XSB2U-1
Single prototype, powered by a 750 hp (560 kW) R-1535-78 engine.
SB2U-1
Initial production version powered by an 825 hp (615 kW) R-1535-96 engine, 54 built.
SB2U-2
Same as SB2U-1 but with minor equipment changed, 58 built.
XSB2U-3
Single prototype of the extended-range version with twin floats, converted from the SB2U-1.
SB2U-3
Similar to the SB2U-2 but fitted with an 825 hp (615 kW) R-1535-102 engine, crew armor and two 0.5 in (12.7 mm) guns, 57 built
V-156F-3
Export version for the French Navy with the company built "finger" dive breaks enabled and the centerline bomb displacing gear removed due to security restrictions(was to have been replaced by domestically produced Alkan bomb release equipment, the invasion prevented this), 40 built.
V-156B-1
Export version similar to the SB2U-3 and powered by a 750 hp (560 kW) R-1535-SB4-G engine for the British Royal Navy. Designated Chesapeake Mk.I; 50 built.
V-167
The V-156 company demonstrator was fitted with a more powerful Pratt & Whitney R-1830 engine and redesignated V-167. It remained a one-off.

== Operators ==
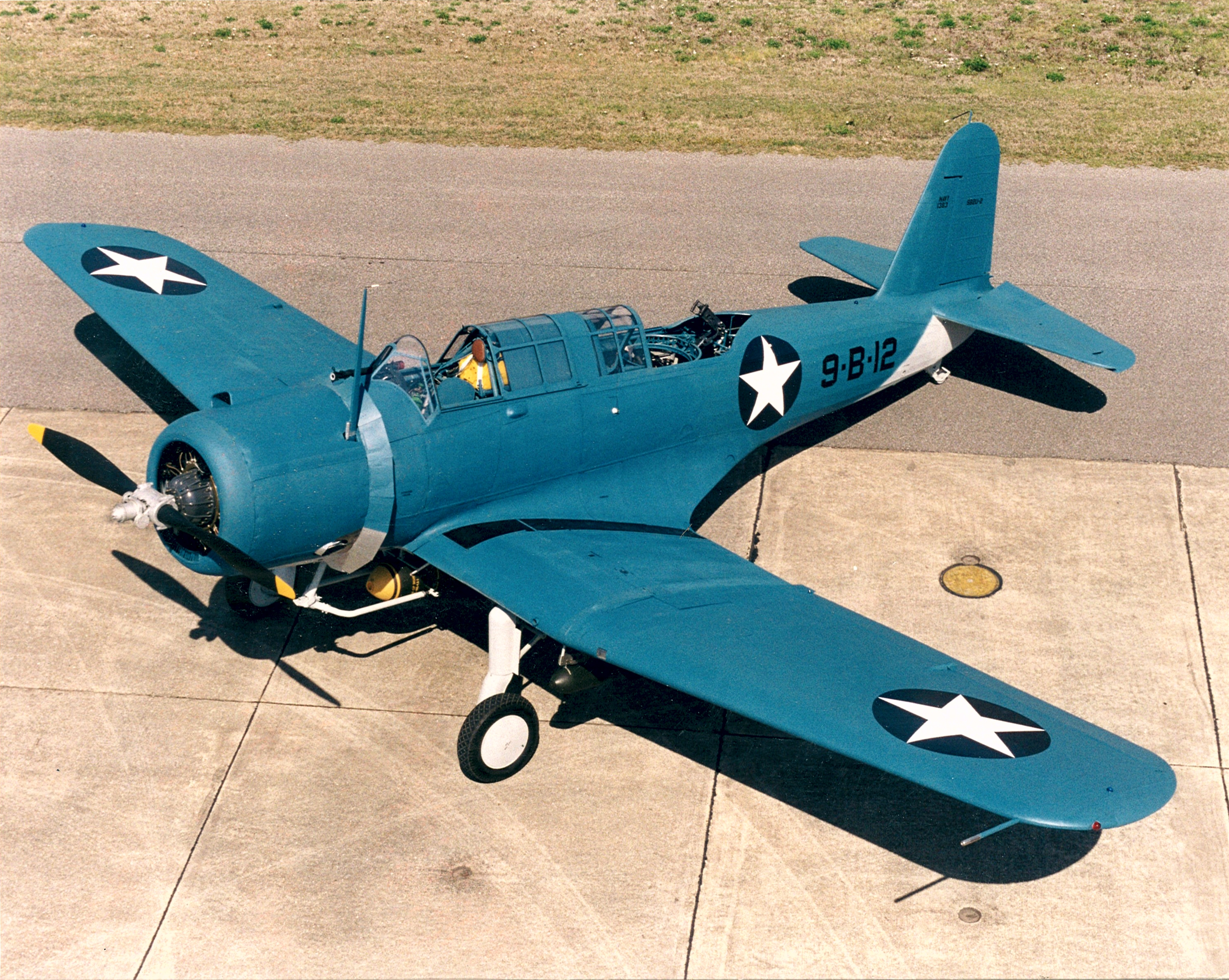
SB2U-2 of VB-9 from the National Museum of Naval Aviation

France

- French Navy - Aéronavale

United Kingdom

- Royal Navy Fleet Air Arm
  - 811 Naval Air Squadron

United States

- United States Navy
- United States Marine Corps

== Surviving aircraft ==
Only one known survivor exists today:

- SB2U-2 Vindicator, Bureau Number 1383, is on display at the National Naval Aviation Museum at NAS Pensacola, Florida.

== Specifications (SB2U-3) ==
Vought SB2U-1 Vindicator

Data from The Annals of Sugar Baker Two Uncle

General characteristics

- Crew: 2
- Length: 33 ft 11 3/4 in (10.36 m)
- Wingspan: 41 ft 10 7/8 in (12.77 m)
- Height: 14 ft 3 in (4.34 m) (tail down, propeller vertical)
- Wing area: 305.3 sq ft (28.36 m^{2})
- Empty weight: 5,634 lb (2,556 kg)
- Gross weight: 7,474 lb (3,390 kg)
- Max takeoff weight: 9,421 lb (4,273 kg)
- Fuel capacity: 370 US gal (310 imp gal; 1,400 L) internal fuel
- Powerplant: 1 × Pratt & Whitney R-1535-02 Twin Wasp Jr 14-cylinder two-row air-cooled radial engine, 825 hp (615 kW) (take-off power) : 750 hp (560 kW) (continuous power)
- Propellers: 2-bladed Hamilton Standard constant-speed propeller, 11 ft 0 in (3.35 m) diameter

Performance

- Maximum speed: 211 kn (243 mph, 391 km/h) at 9,500 ft (2,900 m)
- Cruise speed: 132 kn (152 mph, 245 km/h) (range cruise)
- Range: 970 nmi (1,120 mi, 1,800 km) (main and wing center-section tanks only), 1,000 lb (450 kg) bombload
- Ferry range: 2,130 nmi (2,450 mi, 3,940 km) (max internal and external fuel)
- Service ceiling: 23,600 ft (7,200 m)
- Rate of climb: 1,070 ft/min (5.4 m/s)
- Time to altitude: 17.5 min to 15,000 ft (4,600 m)

Armament

- Guns:
  - 1 × forward firing 0.50 in (12.7 mm) M2 Browning machine gun in starboard wing
  - 1 × 0.50 in (12.7 mm) machine gun in flexible mount in rear cockpit
- Bombs:
  - 1 × 1,000 lb (450 kg) or 500 lb (230 kg) bomb under fuselage
  - 2 × 100 lb (45 kg) and 8 × 30 lb (14 kg) bombs under wings

== See also ==
Aircraft of comparable role, configuration, and era

- Aichi D3A
- Blackburn Skua
- Breda Ba.65
- Brewster SBA
- Douglas SBD Dauntless
- Junkers Ju 87
- Loire-Nieuport LN.401
- Northrop BT

Related lists

- List of aircraft of World War II
- List of United States Navy aircraft designations (pre-1962)
