= Pratt & Whitney R-1535 Twin Wasp Junior =

1930s American aircraft engine

R-1535 Twin Wasp Junior
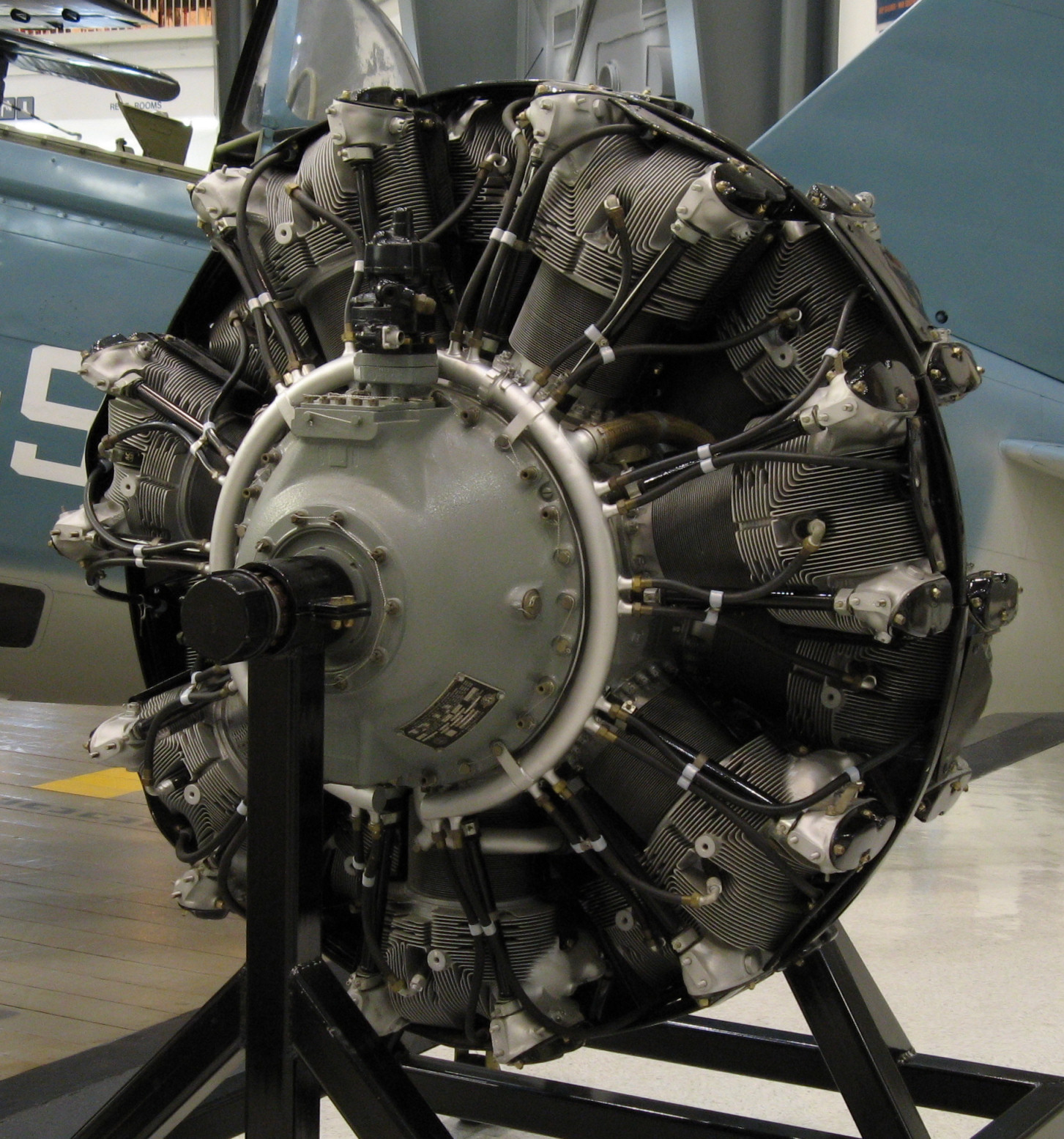
- Pratt & Whitney Twin Wasp Junior, at the National Museum of Naval Aviation, Pensacola, Florida
- Type: Radial engine
- National origin: United States
- Manufacturer: Pratt & Whitney
- First run: 17 October 1931
- Major applications: Bristol Bolingbroke Mk IVW; Curtiss SBC-3 Helldiver; Hughes H-1 Racer; Vought SB2U Vindicator
- Manufactured: 1932–1941
- Number built: 2,880
- Developed from: Pratt & Whitney R-985 Wasp Junior

The Pratt & Whitney R-1535 Twin Wasp Junior is an American aircraft engine developed in the 1930s. The engine was introduced in 1932 as a 14-cylinder version of the 9-cylinder R-985, and was a two-row, air-cooled radial design. Displacement was 1,535 cu in (25.2 L); bore and stroke were both 5 3/16 in (132 mm).

== Variants ==
The following is a representative list of R-1535 variants. Data from a Pratt & Whitney designated-engine index and the U.S. Navy Aeronautical Engine Laboratory report index, unless otherwise noted.

R-1535-11
750 hp (560 kW)
R-1535-13
750 hp (560 kW), 825 hp (615 kW)
R-1535-44
625 hp (466 kW)
R-1535-64
950 hp (710 kW)
R-1535-72
700 hp (520 kW) for takeoff; 650 hp (480 kW) normal at 7,500 ft (2,300 m)
R-1535-82
750 hp (560 kW)
XR-1535-86
825 hp (615 kW); experimental fuel-injection variant
XR-1535-88
825 hp (615 kW)
R-1535-94
825 hp (615 kW)
R-1535-96
825 hp (615 kW)
R-1535-98
700 hp (520 kW)
R-1535-SB4-G
825 hp (615 kW)

== Applications ==
Applications from the Aircraft Engine Historical Society, unless otherwise noted.

- Bellanca 28-70
- Boeing XF6B
- Breguet 695
- Bristol Fairchild Bolingbroke Mk IVW
- Canadian Car and Foundry FDB-1
- Consolidated XB2Y
- Curtiss SBC-3 Helldiver
- Douglas O-46
- Fokker G.I (G.I The Wasp)
- Fokker D.XXI (Finnish licence-built series 4 and 5)
- Great Lakes BG
- Grumman F2F
- Grumman F3F-1
- Grumman XJF-1 Duck (prototype only)
- Grumman XSBF
- Grumman XSF-2
- Hughes H-1 Racer
- Miles Master
- Northrop 3A
- Northrop A-17
- Northrop BT
- Northrop XFT-2
- Potez 63.12
- Vought SBU Corsair
- Vought SB2U Vindicator
- Vought V-141
- Vought XF3U
- Vought XO4U-2

== Engines on display ==
- There is a R-1535-96 on display at the New England Air Museum, Bradley International Airport, Windsor Locks, CT.
- There is an R-1535 on display at the San Diego Air and Space Museum. It is now being installed in the museum's Hughes H-1 Racer reproduction project.
- There is an R-1535 on display at Patria Group Linnavuori plant at Jyväskylä, Finland. It had belonged to Finnish Air Force Fokker D.XXI FR-137

== Specifications (R-1535-SB4-G) ==
Data from

=== General characteristics ===
- Type: Fourteen-cylinder two-row supercharged air-cooled radial engine
- Bore: 5 3/16 in (131.8 mm)
- Stroke: 5 3/16 in (131.8 mm)
- Displacement: 1,534.9 cu in (25.153 L)
- Length: 53.27 in (1,353 mm)
- Diameter: 44.13 in (1,121 mm)
- Dry weight: 1,087 lb (493 kg)

=== Components ===
- Valvetrain: Two overhead valves per cylinder
- Supercharger: Single-speed centrifugal type supercharger, 11:1 step-up
- Fuel system: Two-barrel Stromberg carburetor
- Fuel type: 87 octane rating gasoline
- Cooling system: Air-cooled
- Reduction gear: Epicyclic gearing, 0.75:1

=== Performance ===
- Power output: 825 hp (615 kW) at 2,625 rpm for takeoff
- Specific power: 0.54 hp/cu in (24.57 kW/L)
- Compression ratio: 6.75:1
- Specific fuel consumption: 0.49 lb/(hp•h) (295 g/(kW•h))
- Oil consumption: 0.39 oz/(hp•h) (15 g/(kW•h))
- Power-to-weight ratio: 0.76 hp/lb (1.25 kW/kg)

== See also ==
- Pratt & Whitney Wasp series

Related development

- Pratt & Whitney R-985 Wasp Junior
- Pratt & Whitney R-1340 Wasp
- Pratt & Whitney R-1830 Twin Wasp
- Pratt & Whitney R-2800 Double Wasp
- Pratt & Whitney R-4360 Wasp Major

Comparable engines

- Bristol Taurus

Related lists

- List of aircraft engines
