= List of accidents and incidents involving military aircraft (1935–1939) =

This is a list of accidents and incidents involving military aircraft grouped by the year in which the accident or incident occurred. Not all of the aircraft were in operation at the time. Combat losses are not included except for a very few cases denoted by singular circumstances.

== Aircraft terminology ==
Information on aircraft gives the type, and if available, the serial number of the operator in italics, the constructors number, also known as the manufacturer's serial number (c/n), exterior codes in apostrophes, nicknames (if any) in quotation marks, flight callsign in italics, and operating units.

== 1935 ==
19 January
Chief Warrant Gunner and Naval Aviation Pilot (CWO-GUN; NAP) Charles T. Thrun, USCG, Coast Guard Aviator Number 3, is killed when his Grumman JF-2 Duck, 162, c/n 189, crashes into the Delaware Bay at Cape May, New Jersey. CWO Thrun was the first Coast Guard aviator to die in the line of duty. Second crewman on board survives. Joe Baugher states that the airframe was reserialled as V136, even though it was no longer on inventory.

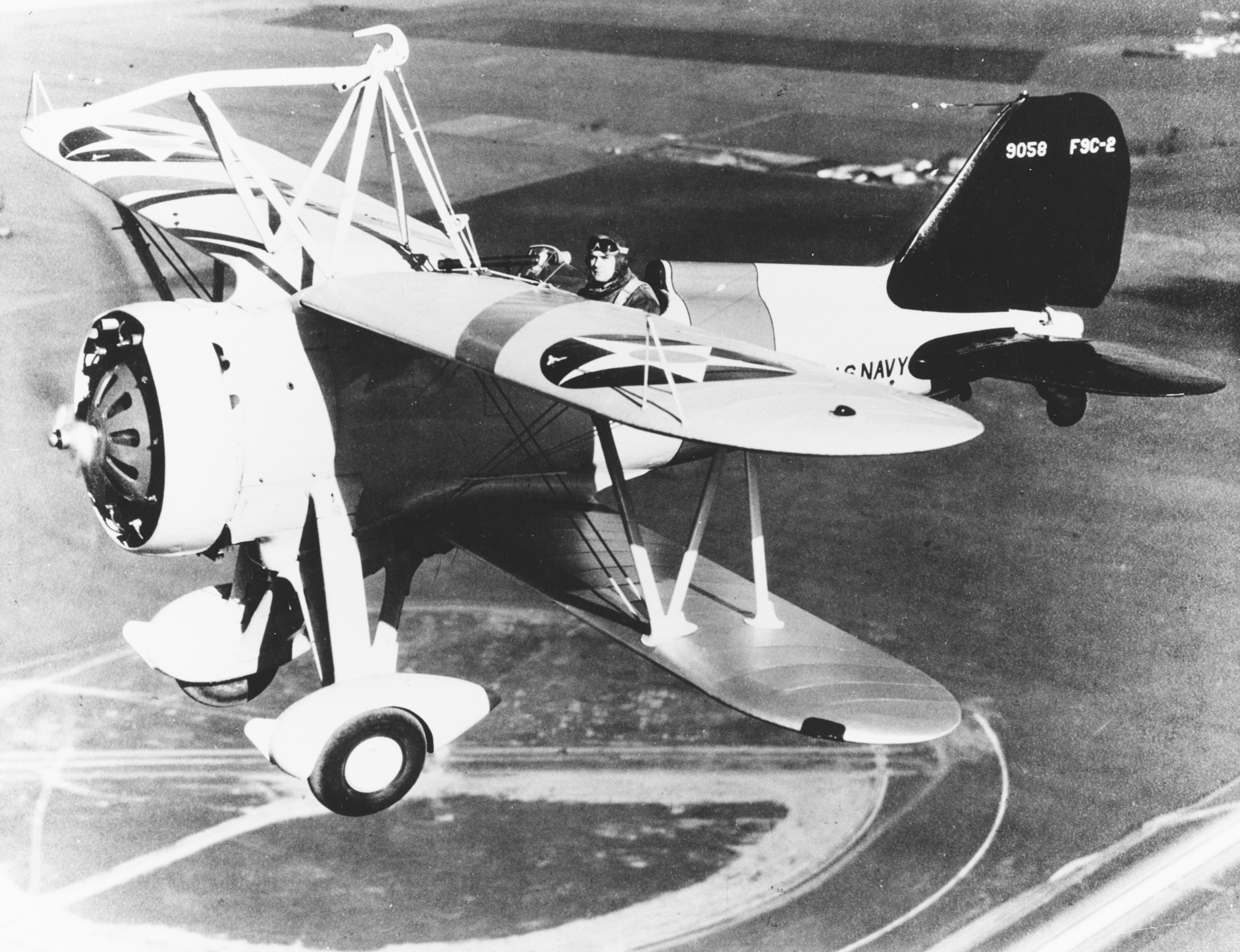
F9C Sparrowhawk BuNo 9058 in flight over Moffett Field, California in 1934. This aircraft was lost with the USS Macon. Pilot in this photo is Lt. Harold B. Miller, commander of the Heavier-Than-Air Unit.

12 February
The US Navy's last rigid airship, the USS Macon, loses its upper fin off Point Sur, California, sinks to the surface of the Pacific Ocean in a controlled crash, and is lost, although the inclusion of lifevests on board allows the saving of 81 of 83 crew. It takes with it the four Curtiss F9C-2 Sparrowhawks, BuNos. A-9058/9061 carried aboard for fleet scouting. The airship's remains lie unfound until 1990 when a fisherman brings up a girder. Wreck is subsequently found by crewed Navy submersible Sea Cliff.

15 February
Short Singapore flying boat K3595 crashes in the Peloritani mountain range near Messina, Sicily in poor visibility. All on board are killed - eight RAF personnel and a civilian Senior Technical Officer of the Royal Aircraft Establishment. The aircraft was one of four that departed from the United Kingdom four weeks earlier for delivery to No. 205 Squadron RAF, based in Singapore. One of the victims of the crash is Flight Lieutenant Henry Longfield Beatty, the half-brother of The First Sea Lord David Beatty, 1st Earl Beatty. They were buried at Capuccini Naval Cemetery, Malta.

25 February
A Curtiss Y1O-40B Raven, 32-416, of the 1st Observation Squadron, 9th Observation Group, Mitchel Field, Long Island, New York, piloted by Don W. Smith, suffers major damage when it force lands due to engine failure at Floyd Bennett Field, New York City, New York. Repaired.

22 March
Prototype Grumman XF3F-1, BuNo 9727 (1st), c/n 257, company model G-11, first flown 20 March 1935, disintegrates when pulled sharply out of a terminal velocity dive, the tenth and final such test in six flights, killing pilot Jimmy Collins. G-forces in this dive estimated at 12–13, wrenching wings off, engine torn from mount. The airframe impacted in Pinelawn Cemetery, Farmingdale, Long Island. 9727 serial applied to three Grumman prototypes, two of which crashed. The Navy immediately orders a replacement which will be completed in two months and fly on 9 May.

April
Yugoslavian Air Force Ikarus IK-1, high-wing monoplane fighter, first prototype crashes on third flight at Zemun airfield when it fails to recover from power dive, pilot Capt. Leonid Bajdak, parachuting to safety. Examination of wreck revealed that fabric covering of the port wing had failed due to negligence in sewing the seams. Second prototype ordered as Ikarus IK-2, wings metal-skinned.

16 April
Flying Officer Clive Newton Edgerton takes off from Laverton in RAAF Westland Wapiti, A5-31, but after entering a steep dive from 15,000 feet is unable to recover. "The structure of the aircraft failed during the test flight and the aircraft crashed at Werribee." Witnesses reported that the wings failed and folded back along the fuselage. The lower starboard wing landed in a paddock 1½ miles from the fuselage. The Aircraft Accident Investigation Committee (AAIC) reported that "The tailplane actuating gear was in full forward position...the aircraft had five ballast weights in the tail...when there should have been six, and in addition another four in the passenger's cockpit, so that the aircraft was obviously tail light and nose heavy. Apparently the pilot had his tail actuating gear into the full forward, giving maximum lift to the tail to enable him to go into a dive." The speed of Edgerton's dive was so great that the blades of the airscrew were pulled from the boss by the centrifugal force.

17 May
Second of three Grumman XF3F-1 prototypes, BuNo 9727 (2nd), first flown 9 May, crashes on the first day it arrives at NAS Anacostia. Pilot Lee Gelbach is unable to recover from a flat spin which develops during a ten-turn right-hand spin demonstration – bails out safely. "The pilot's report indicated that high speeds induced directional instability. This caused the XF3F-1 to enter a flat spin from which recovery was impossible." A third Grumman XF3F-1 prototype will be built, using some parts salvaged from second prototype, also with BuNo 9727 (3rd), but pilot Bill H. McAvoy will be luckier than his two fellow test pilots, and NOT have to evacuate the Flying Barrel during testing. The Navy accepts the (third) prototype on 1 August and orders 54 F3F-1s on 4 August.

18 May
The Tupolev ANT-20, Maxim Gorky, the largest aircraft ever built to that time, flown by pilots I. V. Mikheyev and I. S. Zhurov, and three more planes (Tupolev ANT-14, Polikarpov R-5 and Polikarpov I-5) take off for a demonstration flight over Moscow. As a result of a poorly executed loop maneuver (a third such stunt on this flight) around the plane performed by an accompanying I-5 fighter, flown by Nikolai Blagin, both planes collide and the Maxim Gorky crashes into a low-rise residential neighborhood west of present-day Sokol station. Forty-five people are killed in the crash, including crew members and 33 family members of some of those who had built the aircraft. (While authorities announced that the fatal maneuver was impromptu and reckless, it has been recently suggested that it might have been a planned part of the show.) Also killed was the fighter pilot, Blagin, who was made a scapegoat in the crash and subsequently had his name used eponymously (Blaginism) to mean, roughly, a "cocky disregard of authority." However, Blagin was given a state funeral at Novodevichy Cemetery together with ANT-20 victims.

21 May
A U.S. Navy Martin PM-1 is lost off Midway Island with six crew during a mass flight from Hawaii to that island.

18 June
The Seversky SEV-2XP is heavily damaged (perhaps intentionally) while en route to Wright Field, Ohio, for the 1935 U.S. Army Air Corps competition for a new single-seat fighter. The two-seat design is reworked into a single-seater with retractable undercarriage when the Air Corps delays the competition until April 1936.

20 June
Douglas Y1O-35, 32-319, c/n 1119, of the 88th Observation Squadron, suffers loss of power on right engine during takeoff from Griffith Park, Los Angeles, California for flight to Rockwell Field, San Diego, California, at ~1000 hrs. Pilot, Cadet Tracy R. Walsh, manages to hop over soldiers breaking camp alongside runway but does not have sufficient flying speed. Airplane crashes through a tent, a fence, and into an automobile, demolishing itself, the vehicle, and killing three civilians in the car. Three crew on plane unhurt. O-35 surveyed and dropped from records at March Field, 15 October 1935.

21 June
A Curtiss Y1O-40B Raven, 32-416, repaired after being wrecked at Floyd Bennett Field, New York City, on 25 February 1935, now flying out of Brooks Field, Texas, is written off in a take-off accident at Hatbox Field, Muskogee, Oklahoma this date. Pilot is Charles A. Pursley.

Circa July
Within three weeks of arriving at the Erprobungstelle at Rechlin, Germany for testing, both the Henschel Hs 123V1 and V2 (D-ILUA) prototype dive bombers crash after failing to pull out of terminal velocity dives when wing centre-sections fail, both pilots killed.

30 July
The prototype Northrop 3A, (XP-948) c/n 44, intended for the 1935 U.S. Army Air Corps competition for a new single-seat fighter, is lost over Santa Monica Bay, California, out of Jack Northrop Field, Hawthorne, California, during spin stall trials. Pilot killed. No trace of the pilot, 1st Lt. Frank Scare, or wreckage was found. Design rights sold in 1936 to Vought, becoming the V-141. Pilot's name also reported as Arthur H. Skaer, Jr.

19 August
Martin B-12A, 33-167, of the 31st Bomb Squadron, 7th Bomb Group, Hamilton Field, California, piloted by William Ball, receives heavy damage when the landing gear collapses on landing at Medford Airport, Medford, Oregon.

12 September
Prototype Gloster Gladiator, KS200, suffers bad landing at Martlesham Heath, Suffolk, ending up on nose, starboard lower wingtip crushed. Repaired, it will survive until late 1942.

October
During training, Adolf Galland crashes in a Focke-Wulf Fw 44 biplane and is in a coma for three days, suffering serious skull fractures, a broken nose, and a partially blinded left eye from glass fragments. His commander, Major Rheitel, an aviator from the First World War, assists him during his recovery and getting back into flying.

5 October
A prototype Supermarine Walrus, K4797, carrying Admiral Roger Backhouse crashed while attempting a water landing in Portland Harbour, after attempting a water landing with the wheels still lowered. The crew and passenger were rescued with minor injuries and the aircraft was later recovered.

7 October
Lieutenant Colonel James Edward Davis, USMC, (born at Amherst County, Virginia, in 1894), commander of Marine Aircraft Group 2, and his mechanic, Sergeant I. M. Owen, on a flight to NAS San Diego, California, in a Vought SU-2, refuel at Lordsburg, New Mexico, but crash on takeoff, the aircraft bursting into flame. Davis is burned beyond recognition, but Owen is thrown clear of the wreckage and survives. After funeral rites at Coronado, California, on 10 October, Davis is buried at Arlington National Cemetery. His widow, the former Beatrice H. Howe, returns to her native Pensacola, Florida, where the couple met during Davis’ flight training.

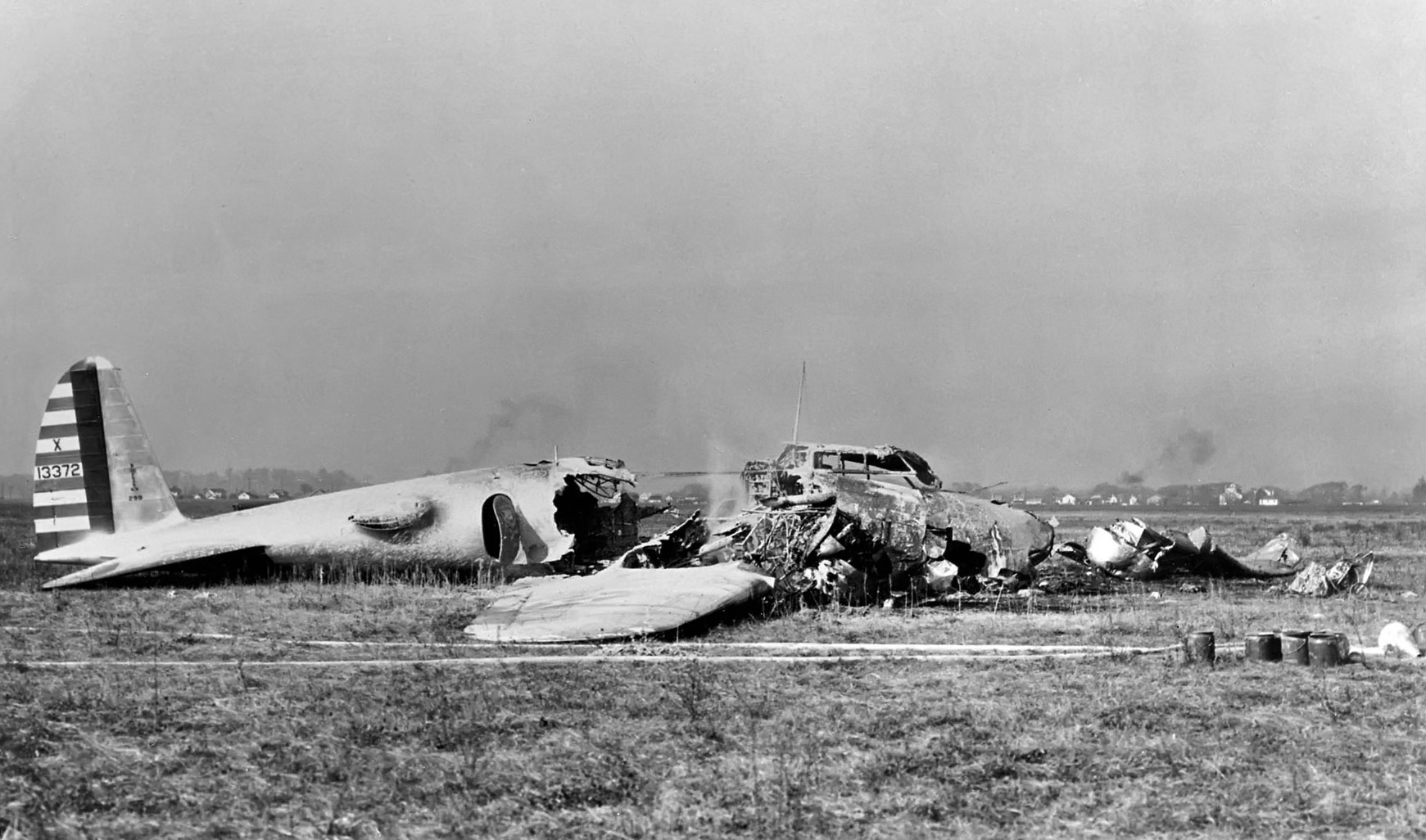
Crashed Model 299 at Wright Field, Ohio.

30 October
Prototype Boeing Model 299, NX13372, 'X13372', c/n 1963, the future Boeing B-17 Flying Fortress, crashes on take-off from Wright Field, Ohio, due to locked control surfaces, killing early military aviator and test pilot Maj. Ployer Peter Hill. Other engineers taken to hospital with injuries. Boeing test pilot and observer Les Tower died later. Ogden Air Depot, Utah, renamed Hill Field, (later Hill Air Force Base), on 1 December 1939. As the prototype was owned by Boeing, it had no USAAC serial.

13 December
A U.S. Army Air Corps officer, Major Arthur K. Ladd, is killed "instantly" in the ~1400 hrs. crash of a Boeing P-12F, 32–100, c.n. 1676, '60', the 24th of 25 of the model built, of the 36th Pursuit Squadron, into a swamp near the Wimbee River on Heyward Island, ~3 miles E of Dale, South Carolina, in Beaufort County, while en route from Langley Field, Virginia, to Miami, Florida, for the eighth annual All American air manoeuvers, an air race and exhibition held 13–15 December. "Major Ladd's body was badly mangled. Authorities from Parris Island removed the body about 5:30 o'clock this afternoon and carried it to Parris Island to await instructions. Major Ladd appeared to be between 40 and 55 years of age." (He was 45.) "Parris Island officers who visited the scene said they could not tell what caused the crash; neither did they know what Major Ladd's destination was, nor where he had come from. The orders he flew under were sealed, as is customary." Maj. Ladd was the assistant supply officer for the General Headquarters Air Force from its creation on 1 March 1935, working for Lt. Col. Joseph P. McNarney, supply officer of the GHQ force. Ladd had previously been assigned at Maxwell Field, Alabama, where he was an instructor in logistics movements of troops and supplies in the Air Corps Tactical School. Born in Texas on 1 November 1890, he was commissioned a second lieutenant of field artillery, Reserve Corps, on 27 November 1917. Investigation of the accident was halted pending the arrival of an investigating commission from Fort Bragg, it was announced on 14 December. "Colonel J. A. Rosell, of the marine station here, said Fort Bragg officers had been ordered here by the fourth corps commander at Atlanta. He added that, at their request, a guard was being maintained in the swamp over the demolished plane. He said that Langley field [sic] officials had ordered the body prepared for burial at Arlington national cemetery, [sic] but that it was being held here pending arrival of the investigating commission which might wish to view it." Fairbanks Air Base, Fairbanks, Alaska, is renamed Ladd Field on 1 December 1939.

16 December
"Miami, Dec. 16 – U.P.: Second Lieutenant Robert L. Carver, [service number O-18890,] twenty-eight, Barksdale field [sic], Shreveport, La., was instantly killed today when his 230-mile-an-hour P-26 army pursuit plane crashed in swamps twelve miles south of here. Carver was a former West Point football backfield star. He was attached to the fifty-fifth pursuit squadron that came here last week to participate in the general headquarters air force war games and the All-American air maneuvers." This airframe was P-26A, 33–87, and it came down ½ mi NE of Chapman Field, Florida. The Aviation Archeological Investigation & Research website lists the P-26 as being assigned to the 79th Pursuit Squadron, 20th Pursuit Group, at Barksdale Field, and that the aircraft stalled and spun in with fatal results. It also cites the accident date as 15 December 1935. Carver played for Army in 1929, 1930, and 1931, graduating from the United States Military Academy in 1932. The 20th PG will fly P-26s until January 1938.

== 1936 ==
11 January
Martin B-10, 33-151, c/n 519, of the 32d Bomb Squadron, 19th Bomb Group, is moderately damaged in a belly landing at Rockwell Field, Coronado, California, when the undercarriage fails to extend. The San Bernardino Daily Sun reported that "A big Martin bomber, its landing gear out of commission, was brought safely to earth with three occupants at San Diego yesterday, after one passenger had 'bailed out' over March field. [sic] Lieut. Paul B. Balfour, of Coronado, pilot of the ship, was credited with particularly skillful handling in landing it safely at Rockwell field [sic], San Diego. First indication that the craft was in trouble was wirelessed to March field shortly after Lieutenant Balfour, with three passengers, had taken off from the latter base. Circling over the field, the lieutenant gave the occupants their choice of taking to parachutes or staying with the ship in an attempt to land it. Private George L. Brown, of Golden Colo., elected to jump, 'bailing out' over the air field. He received a fractured ankle in landing. The other two, Sgt. Ray Riley, of Holton, La., and Private Robert Hart, of Oakland, decided to remain with the ship. Followed by another bomber, piloted by Capt. R. B. Williams, Lieutenant Balfour turned his plane toward Sanj Diego, where landing facilities at Rockwell field are better than at March field. Aided by a west wind and a high ceiling, he dropped the ship down at 65 miles an hour. It slid along the ground for about 150 feet, spraying sand, but remained upright. The bottom of the fuselage and the propeller tips were slightly damaged. A fire truck, crash truck, ambulances and emergency chews [sic] were waiting in readiness as Lieutenant Balfour essayed his hazardous landing. The three were brought back to March field in the other bomber, piloted by Captain Williams, which had followed Lieutenant Balfour's ship to the ground at Rockwell field. Lieutenant Balfour said a cable, connecting with the retractable landing gear, had been broken, making lowering of the gear impossible." With his jump, Private Brown became Caterpillar Club member number 761. Repaired, this B-10 will be surveyed at March Field on 8 September 1937.

22 January
Air Corps Flying Cadet Frederick G. Huish bails out of Consolidated Y1PT-11B, 32-367, of the 53d School Squadron, 10 miles SE of Randolph Field, San Antonio, Texas, after the plane enters a spin/stall, becoming Caterpillar Club member number 762 in the process.

24 January
Prototype Junkers Ju 87 V1, Werk Nr. 4921, D-UBYR, fitted with a pair of vertical fins, suffers tail section oscillation during medium-angle test dive, loses starboard fin during attempted recovery, goes into inverted spin, crashes at Dessau, Germany. All subsequent Ju 87s have single fin tail unit. Pilot Willy Neuenhofen and his engineer, Heinrich Kreft, are killed. Another source gives the crash location as Kleutsch, near Dresden.

24 January
Keystone B-4A, 32-118, of the 23d Bomb Squadron, flown by Charles E. Fisher, and B-4A, 32-132, of the 72d Bomb Squadron, piloted by William G. Beard, both assigned to the 19th Bomb Group, collide 1,200 feet over Luke Field, Ford Island, Oahu, H. I., killing six of eight crew aboard the two bombers, described at the time as "the worst air accident in Hawaiian aviation history." Private Thomas E. Lanigan, Air Corps, and 2d Lieutenant Charles E. Fisher, Air Corps Reserve, become Caterpillar Club members 763 and 764, respectively, when they take to their parachutes.

26 February
Capt. Karl G. E. Gimmler is killed when his Boeing P-26A Peashooter, 33–93, of the 27th Pursuit Squadron, 1st Pursuit Group, Selfridge Field, Michigan, stalls and spins into the ground at Barksdale Field, Louisiana. Airframe dropped from records at Selfridge in June 1936. Some sources also list this accident as occurring 20 February 1936.

2 March
During spin testing, the Heinkel He 112 V2 prototype, D-IHGE, unarmed, like the V1, and powered by a 640 hp Jumo 210 engine, crashes this date. It had achieved a maximum speed of 480 km/298.3 mph. Pilot Gerhard Nitschke, unable to recover from the spin, successfully bails out.

8 March
Lt. Robert K. Giovannoli is KWF when the starboard wing detaches from Boeing P-26 Peashooter, 32-414, c/n 1680, of the Materiel Division, Wright Field, Ohio, while "coming out of a glide 500 feet over Logan Field, Baltimore. Giovannoli was awarded a medal recently for his heroism last October in helping to rescue two men from a burning army bomber which had crashed at Dayton, O. His home was in Lexington, Ky." He had been key in pulling Leslie Tower and Ployer Peter Hill from the cockpit of the burning Boeing 299 prototype after it crashed on takeoff on 30 October 1935. Giovannoli received the Soldier's Medal posthumously as he died before the President could make the award.
23 March
Arado Ar 65, Werk Nr. 111, D-2912 / D-IVYZ, of III/JG, crashes during aerobatics at too low altitude – left wing failed. Pilot killed.

30 March
Sole Pitcairn YG-2 gyrocopter, (Pitcairn PA-33), 35–270, undergoing tests by NACA as NACA 88, crashes near the Back River, Virginia, two miles SE of Langley Field, and burns. Pilot William H. McAvoy and engineer John Wheatley bail out after rotor structural failure.

5 April
All five crew perish when Keystone B-6A, 32-173, of the 20th Bomb Squadron, Langley Field, Virginia, off-course at night in a storm, strikes the ridge of Blue Mountain seven miles NE of Fredericksburg, Pennsylvania. "The crash would have been avoided if the plane had been 250 feet higher. A state highway patrolman who saw it said it appeared to be in trouble as it approached the mountain ridge. It tore a wide path through the heavy timber as it struck, then dashed nose first into a steep cliff, where the mountain falls sharply away in a 75-foot drop. Near-by residents heard it, but before they could get to the scene the plane was afire, its front buried in the ground, its tail caught in a tree." Killed were Lt. Stetson Brown, St. Johnsbury, Vermont, pilot; Staff Sgt. Ernest Endy, Oley, Pennsylvania; Pvt. Arthur Metz, Chambersburg, Pennsylvania; Pvt. William Yost, McKees Rocks, Pennsylvania; and Cadet Paul Ampspaugh, Cleveland, Ohio.

19 May
"A March field [sic] flying cadet, Douglas W. Smith, 23, parachuted to safety yesterday (19 May) a few moments before his plane crashed and burned four miles south of Riverside. The ship, a Boeing P-12 pursuit, crashed near the entrance of shaft No. 4 of the Metropolitan water district's Val Verde tunnel. Smith, who had leaped from the cockpit of the speedy ship at 1,500 feet elevation, landed uninjured 75 feet from the wreckage. Smith, attached to the Thirty-fourth Army attack squadron at March field, was flying in close formation fighting maneuvers with another ship at 3,000 feet when his ship went into a power dive. He failed to bring it out, and instead it started to spin. He jumped when he saw it was certain to crash. The youth, son of Mr. and Mrs. Arthur W. Smith, of Mill Valley, graduated from Stanford university [sic] in 1933. He was transferred to March field from Langley field [sic], in Virginia, two weeks ago. Brig-Gen. Henry Black Clagett, commander at March field, ordered a three-man board of inquiry to investigate the mishap." He was flying P-12C, 31-147, of the 34th Attack Squadron. This was the first production P-12C of 96 built. With this jump, Smith became Caterpillar Club member number 797.

25 May
Maj. Hezekiah ("Hez") McClellan, (1894–1936), was killed while flight-testing Consolidated TPB-2A, 35-1, which crashed near Centerville, Ohio. Posthumously awarded the DFC, McClellan prepared early charts and records while pioneering Alaskan air routes. Sacramento Air Depot renamed McClellan Field on 1 December 1939.

3 June
In a crash that closely parallels the loss of the Boeing 299, General Walther Wever, Chief of Staff of the Luftwaffe, is killed at Dresden, Germany on take-off in a Heinkel He 70 when he fails to activate a lever in the cockpit that unlocks the control surfaces. Wever, a supporter of four-engine long-range bomber design, had been developing a strategic bombing capability for the Luftwaffe, but following his death, Hermann Göring cancels these projects and the German Air Force never fields a viable strategic bomber.

6 June
Martin B-10B, 34–89, c/n 620, of the 1st Bomb Squadron, 9th Bomb Group, based at Mitchel Field, Hempstead, Long Island, New York, piloted by Darlene E. Bailey, gets into an irrecoverable spin, crew bails out, plane comes down in a field at Syosset, L.I., New York. Written off.

9 June
Sole Kellett YG-1 gyrocopter, 35-278, of the Material Division, Wright Field, Dayton, Ohio, acquired by the U.S. Army Air Corps for evaluation, is moderately damaged in a takeoff accident at Pope Army Airfield, Fort Bragg, North Carolina. Pilot was Erickson Nichols. Repaired.

10 June
U.S. Navy Spartan NP-1, BuNo 3824, assigned at NAS Anacostia, Anacostia, D.C., ditches in the Back River, Virginia, after suffering engine failure following take-off from Langley Field, Virginia. Pilot J. Ware is KWF. Note: the date of this accident is under further review – 201 NP-1s were ordered in 1940 by the Navy, and a 1936 incident seems unlikely. Additional sources sought. A possibility exists that this is a misreporting of the loss of Vought SBU-1 Corsair, BuNo 9824 (note single digit variation), that is listed as crashing on this same date by Joseph Baugher, with the same airframe listed as crashing in Virginia on 9 June 1936 by another source.
22 June
A Blackburn Baffin, S5162 of A Flight, RAF Gosport, flown by Lt. Guy Kennedy Horsey on torpedo-dropping practice, buzzed S.S. Normandie a mile (2 km) off Ryde Pier and collided with a derrick which was transferring a motor car belonging to Arthur Evans, MP, onto a barge alongside the ship. The aircraft crashed onto Normandie's bow. The pilot was taken off by tender, but the wreckage of the aircraft remained on board Normandie as she had to sail due to the tide. It was carried to Le Havre, France. A salvage team from the Royal Air Force later removed the wreckage. The pilot was Court-martialled and found guilty on two charges. Evans' car was wrecked in the accident, which was brought up in Parliament.
17 July
French Bloch MB.150.01 fighter prototype suffers damage to tailwheel as it taxies from the hangar at Villacoublay to inaugurate its flight test program. Returned to the factory at Courbevoie for repairs which, inexplicably, take ten months to accomplish. Poor ground handling of design, as well as unsuitability for mass-production, forces total reworking of the type, the new version being designated the Bloch MB.151, and developmentally, the Bloch MB.152.

20 July
The Spanish Civil War begins on 17 July 1936, but the Nationalists are handicapped almost immediately by the death of Lieutenant General José Sanjurjo, the senior leader, at Estoril, on this date in a plane crash. A plot against him by Francisco Franco is suggested but nothing is ever proven. Pilot Juan Antonio Ansaldo survives the crash of the biplane, which was overloaded with Sanjurjo’s baggage.

21 July
Northrop XFT-2, BuNo 9400, c/n 43, (XFT-1 modified with engine change and smaller fuel capacity), to NAS Anacostia, Washington, D.C., in April 1936 for tests. Finding the design to be non-airworthy, the Navy orders that it be returned to Northrop. Ignoring instructions to ship it to Northrop's El Segundo factory, a test pilot attempts to fly the XFT-2 back to California, the aircraft entering a spin and crashing while crossing the Allegheny Mountains this date. "Northrop's test pilot arrived at Anacostia to retrieve the XFT-2 and was told of the grounding order. This applied also to any ferry flights – the plane was simply too unstable to be safely flown – and arrangements were to be made for other means of transport back to the factory. However, the pilot had been sent to fly the plane back and it was his intent to do so. Somehow he succeeded in gaining access to the fighter one July morning in 1936, and took off into the predawn darkness. The XFT project was terminated a couple of hours later when a combination of turbulence over the Alleghenies and the little fighter's propensity to spin planted the aircraft in a Pennsylvania farmyard. The daring test pilot recovered from his injuries, and Northrop squared with the Navy by reimbursing them for the entire expense of the XFT program." Contract closed out in November 1936. Joe Baugher cites crash date of July 1937.

30 July
Secrecy about Italy’s involvement in the nascent Spanish Civil War is lost when two Savoia-Marchetti SM.81s of the Regia Aeronautica crashland in French Moroccan territory in North Africa, adjacent to Spanish Morocco. On 6 August, French officials in Paris announce that they agree unanimously that their investigation has determined that the planes were units of the Italian Air Force and were piloted by regular officers and were part of a regular squadron. The Italian airmen had insisted that the planes were sent by a private Italian company.

6 August
”RENNES, France, Aug. 6. - Four army fliers were killed today near here when their plane broke in two during maneuvers. The pilot was catapulted from the crushed fuselage and three others were burned to death when the plane crashed at the Gael military air camp and burst into flames.”

13 August
Martin B-10B, 34-106, of the 96th Bomb Squadron, Langley Field, Virginia, crashes five miles W of West Point, Virginia, killing three of four crew. “WEST POINT, Va. (UP) - Three army flyers, trapped in a flaming bombing plane, were burned to death as the ship plummeted to earth early today. The radio operator parachuted to safety. The dead: Second Lieut. Willis S. Marvin, Riverside, Calif., pilot; Pvt. John J. Maher, McKeesport, Pa., and Pvt. James E. Crittenden, Richmond, Va. Norbert D. Flinn, McGuffey, O., radio operator, jumped in a parachute and landed in a tree, suffering only a cut lip. The bomber plunged a thousand feet to earth about midnight. ‘There was a fire and I was given the order to jump,’ Flinn told H. W. Williamson of the Virginia state police. The radio operator was caught in a tree with his parachute and his shouts brought aid. He rode in the front seat of an ambulance that took him to Langley field. The bodies of his three companions were in the back of the ambulance. Williamson said Flinn was unable to tell just what happened except ‘there was some sort of a fire.’ Several persons who saw the bomber as it made a training flight from Langley field, heard a muffled explosion. Light flared in the plane, the motor coughed and the bomber fell.”

14 August
”WASHINGTON, Aug. 14. - The navy department announced that Lieut. Lawrence W. Curtin of Greenwich, Conn., was killed today in the wreckage of his navy plane which crashed into the Panama canal one mile northeast of the Pedro Miguel lock, the department was informed.”

20 August
Prototype Vought XSB2U-1 Vindicator, BuNo 9725, first flown at Rentschler Field, East Hartford, Connecticut, on 5 January 1936, accepted by the U.S. Navy on 2 July 1936, crashes near Norfolk, Virginia, this date. During stall tests at low altitude (1,000 feet), the aircraft spun into shallow water of Willoughby Bay, killing the two aboard, pilot Lt. Cmdr. Samuel Hyer Arthur, and Chance Vought observer Robert Witbeck. Testing had sufficiently advanced, however, that a contract was signed on 26 October 1936 for 54 aircraft. The aircraft made its first flight on 21 May 1937 and deliveries to operational units began in December 1937.

11 September
Sole Kellett YG-1 gyrocopter, 35-278, now assigned to the 16th Observation Squadron, is moderately damaged in a takeoff accident at Pope Army Airfield, Fort Bragg, North Carolina, its second at this field this year. Pilot was Hollingsworth F. Gregory.

October
Adolf Galland is seriously injured in his second crash in a year, this time in an Arado Ar 68, ultimately losing all vision in his left eye, but returns to flying after memorizing the eye chart.

25 October
Major Charles H. Howard, winner of the 1932 Mackay Trophy, and Sgt. Edward Gibson are killed in the crash of their Martin B-10B, 34–83, just outside Bryans Mill, Texas.

26 October
RAF Vickers Virginia Mk X J8326 of 214 Squadron is damaged beyond repair in a gale at RAF Scampton, Lincolnshire.

7 November
Polish Lotnictwo Wojskowe PZL.30 Żubr ("Bison") prototype, a twin-engine bomber design modified from a transport rejected in favour of Douglas DC-2s by LOT Polish Airlines, disintegrates in mid-air when wing structure fails. First flown in March 1936, the uninspired composite design of metal, wood and fabric was the first twin-engined bomber of home design to leave the ground, powered by 680 hp (510 kW) P.Z.L. (Bristol) Pegasus radials, but only 16 Żubrs were completed, most relegated to training, none seeing combat. The Romanian Air Force had shown an interest in the Żubr prototype in 1936, and wanted to buy 24 planes. However, after the prototype crash over Michałowice with two Romanian officers on board, they ordered the PZL.37 Łoś instead. (the factory published a cover-up story, that the crash was caused by one of Romanians opening the door during flight).

10 November
U.S. Navy Aviation Cadet William H. Jones, on approach to USS Ranger, operating in the Pacific, in a Grumman F3F-1, BuNo 221, accidentally flies into the foremast of plane guard destroyer. Plane and body sink in 4,600 feet of water.

7 December
First Boeing Y1B-17, 36–149, c/n 1973, first flown 2 December, makes rough landing at Boeing Field, Seattle, Washington, on third flight, when Army pilot Major Stanley Umstead touches down with locked brakes, airframe ends up on nose after short skid. Pilot had used heavy brake applications before take-off, then immediately retracted the overheated undercarriage instead of letting air stream cool it, whereupon the bi-metal brakes fused. Repaired, Flying Fortress departs for Wright Field on 11 January 1937.

18 December
The sole Kreider-Reisner XC-31, 34-26, assigned at Wright Field, Ohio, receives moderate damage in a landing accident resulting in a ground loop, at Pittsburgh-Allegheny County Airport, Pennsylvania. Pilot was Joseph B. Zimmerman.

Post-21 December
Prototype Junkers Ju 88 V1, D-AQEN, first flown at Dessau, Germany on 21 December 1936, crashes after only a few test flights, but is ordered into production.

== 1937 ==
1 January
Lt. Col. Fredrick Irving Eglin (1891–1937), first rated as a military aviator in 1917 and helped train other flyers during World War I, is killed while assigned to General Headquarters, Air Force, Langley Field, Virginia, in the crash of his Northrop A-17 pursuit aircraft, 35–97, at Cheaha Mountain, Alabama in bad weather during flight from Langley to Maxwell Field, Alabama. The Valparaiso Bombing and Gunnery Base renamed Eglin Field 4 August 1937, later Eglin Air Force Base on 24 June 1948.

28 January
Fairchild C-24, 32-289, c/n 6709, of the 1st Air Base Squadron, Langley Field, Virginia, one of four Pilgrim Model 100-Bs acquired by the USAAC and used as an air ambulance into the late 1930s, crashes 5 miles SE of Front Royal, Virginia, killing pilot Joseph B. Zimmerman.

27 February
Two Air Corps Reserve officers are killed in crash of North American BT-9A, 36–118, '3', of the Air Detachment, 6th Corps Area, near the SE corner of Chicago Municipal Airport, during a blind-flying flight. Pilot under the hood was 2d Lt. John P. Spake, 29, of Berwyn, Illinois, with 2d Lt. Clyde H. Wood, Jr., 26, of Chicago, in the rear cockpit. The plane came down in a field at Marquette Road and the Belt Railway of Chicago after 40 minutes in the air. Circling at 500 feet, the plane was seen to waver, then dive into the ground. "Both were co-pilots for the United Airlines, and had been flying since 1931 and were graduates of the army training service."

Late April
The Heinkel He 112 V5, specially adapted to carry liquid propellant rocket motors, and with the enclosed canopy modification of the V3, flies for the first time at Kummersdorf, near Berlin. Piloted by Flugkapitan Erich Warsitz, the aircraft is supposed to carry a motor developed by Wernher von Braun and powered by liquid oxygen-methyl alcohol, but for this flight retains its Junkers Jumo piston engine as the primary means of propulsion. The rocket motor provides a thrust of 2,200 lbs. and operates for 30 seconds. "In a few seconds his speed climbed from 300 km/h to 400 km/h. However, troubles started almost immediately when the temperature in the cockpit became almost unbearable and Warsitz was nearly overcome by fumes. He fully expected the flight to cumulate [sic] in a violent explosion at any second so he jettisoned the canopy and prepared to bail out. But to his surprise, he discovered that he was too low, estimating his altitude to be about 900 ft. He abandoned the bailout and started setting up a landing pattern to the airfield. Here he discovered that the gear uplock/unlocking mechanism was jammed so he came on in gear-up for a clean belly landing. As soon as Warsitz got clear of the plane it caught fire around the tail section." Ground crew respond with equipment immediately and the flames are extinguished. Rebuilt, it will fly again in June 1937 on rocket power alone. Note that different sources describe what sounds like the same flight on different dates, April and June of 1937.

19 May
Prototype Sud-Est LeO H-47 flying boat sustains fatigue failure damage to hull bottom on take-off and, upon landing at Antibes at 19,000 kg (42,000 lb), took in water that displaced the centre of gravity, sinking the aircraft.

3 June
Heinkel He 112, outfitted with a Kummersdorf weapons range-designed 4B rocket motor, piloted by Captain Erich Warsitz, on flight from out-of-way Markwalde airfield at Neuhardenberg, ~70 km E of Berlin, after normal takeoff, pilot engages rocket at half power to avoid overheating. Shutting down after ten seconds of mild acceleration, and gliding "the pilot noticed a strong acrid odor of burning rubber and paint clearly perceptible hot gases flowed under the pilot's seat. The pilot looked to the rear and noticed a strong flickering in the tail area. The airplane at this time was still at an altitude of about a hundred meters. Because the pilot had to fear that the mobility of the control surfaces would be compromised by the fire in the tail section, and because the nitrogen for fire extinguishing was completely exhausted, he decided on an immediate landing. Sufficient altitude to extend the landing gear was no longer available. The aircraft landed with fully extended flaps on its belly and skidded about 45m along the ground. Damage was significant. An unanticipated region of low aerodynamic pressure around the tail had caused alcohol fumes to be sucked back into the fuselage, where they were ignited by heating or the ignition flame." Repaired, the aircraft flies a few more times over the summer but as the safety of the system is doubtful, a redesign is ordered. Note that different sources describe what sounds like the same flight on different dates, April and June of 1937.

3 June
Nationalist leader General Emilio Mola is killed when the Airspeed Envoy in which he is travelling flies into the side of a mountain in bad weather while returning to Vitoria, Spain. The deaths of Sanjurjo, Mola and Goded leave Francisco Franco as the pre-eminent leader of the Nationalist cause. Although there have always been accusations that Franco arranged the deaths of his two rivals, so far no evidence has been produced.

Early July
Hamburger Flugzeugbau Ha 137 V6 dive bomber, D-IDTE, destroyed in crash. No production contract awarded for the type.

23 July – 1 August
During the International Flying Meet at Zürich, German ace Ernst Udet crash lands Messerschmitt Bf 109 V10, D-ISLU, a Bf 109B equipped with early production 950 hp (710 kW) Daimler Benz Db.600 engine, when it suffers power loss during Alps circuit race. Udet attempts to land, walks away from wrecked airframe.

18 August
Col. William Caldwell McChord, (1881–1937), rated a junior military aviator in 1918, was killed while trying to force-land his Northrop A-17, 35–105, near Maidens, Virginia. At the time of his death, he was Chief of the Training and Operations Division in HQ Army Air Corps. Tacoma Field, Washington, was renamed McChord Field, 17 December 1937.

19 September
Junkers EF 61 V1, first prototype of pressurized bomber, suffered control surface flutter, crashed at Dessau, Germany, killing both crew.
October
Sole Junkers Ju 49, D-2688, later D-UBAZ, c/n 3701, a high altitude research aircraft, first flown September 1933, crashes while operated by the Deutsche Versuchsanstalt fur Luftfahrt (German Research Centre for Air Travel).

24 October
During engine start at an airfield on Saishuto Island (now Jeju Province) off of the southern coast of South Korea, a Hirosho G2H1 (Hiro Navy Type 95 Twin-engined Land-based Attacker) catches fire and soon explodes. Fire spreads to other G2Hs, armed with bombs, destroying four and damaging a fifth. Only eight G2H1s were built, six by Hirosho and two by Mitsubishi, the Imperial Japanese Navy deciding to standardize on the slightly smaller Mitsubishi G3M Navy Type 96 twin-engined land-based bomber, Allied codename "Nell".

December
Having set a speed record of 504.988 km/h (313.785 mph) on 22 November 1937, only to have it eclipsed one week later by the Italian Breda Ba 88 at 525.1 km/h (326.3 mph), the Heinkel He 119 V4, D-AUTE, attempts a second run from Hamburg for an out-and-back trip to Stolp (now known as Słupsk). After reaching Stolp at an average speed of just under 595 km/h (370 mph), with a new record apparently in reach, the engine begins to misfire just after course reversal and the fuel gauges fall to zero. Crew feathers propeller and glides to forced landing at Travemünde airfield, but belatedly sees ditches dug across landing area for routine maintenance. Having committed to their approach, they can do nothing, and shear off the undercarriage on the ditches, airframe coming to rest alongside a pumping station with starboard wing torn off by the structure, pilot Gerhard Nitschke seriously injured, co-pilot Hans Dieterle less so. Cause was faulty fuel transfer switch. Following the first record run, Germany described aircraft as an "He 111U" bomber for propaganda purposes, and as the "He 606" to the FAI, an obfuscation that only becomes clear to the Allies after World War II.

December
Junkers EF 61 V2, second prototype of pressurized bomber, crashes at Dessau, Germany, before high-altitude trials can be conducted. Program is abandoned.

9 December
PO3/c Kanichi Kashimura, of the 13th Air Group, Imperial Japanese Navy, downs a Curtiss Hawk Model 75 over Nanchang, China during combat in a Mitsubishi A5M, '4–115', then collides with another aircraft (an unknown type that could have been either Chinese or Japanese), tearing off the outer third of his port wing. Through skillful piloting, he brings damaged aircraft back to base at Shanghai, China, and makes four landing attempts. On final approach, the fighter violently somersaults onto its back upon ground contact, tearing off its tail, but pilot walks away unscathed. Local news reporters dispatch the story back to Japan where Kashimura gains instant fame as "the pilot who returned on one wing."

11 December
Consolidated PB-2A, 35–50, of Headquarters Squadron, 8th Pursuit Group, crashes at Langley Field, Virginia, during low formation pass, killing Army Air Corps Major Alfred J. Waller, a distinguished World War I combat pilot. Waller Army Airfield, activated in Trinidad on 1 September 1941, (later Waller Air Force Base), is named in his honor. Observer, Sergeant John Johnston, is seriously injured. Mass flight operations celebrated Langley Field's 20th anniversary.

== 1938 ==
6 January
U.S. Navy Consolidated PBY-1 Catalina patrol plane, BuNo 0159, of VP-7, crashes during routine flight off Point Loma, California, 2 officers and 5 enlisted men KWF.

2 February
Two U.S. Navy Consolidated PBY-2 Catalinas, BuNo 0462 of VP-13 and BuNo 0463 of VP-11 collide in midair off San Clemente, California, killing 3 officers and 8 enlisted men, 11 of the 14 on board.: An Associated Press account states that the aircraft collided at 2037 hrs., 70 miles SW of Point Loma, and that the survivors were picked up by USS Tennessee.

6 February
Junkers Ju 90 V1, D-AALU, "Der Grosse Dessauer", combination of wings, engines, undercarriage and tail assembly of Junkers Ju 89 V3, Werknummer 4913, mated to a new transport fuselage, broke up in flight while undergoing flutter tests out of Dessau, Germany.

30 March
Two U. S. Navy Consolidated patrol bombers crash off Oahu, H. I., in separate accidents. Five are killed in the first crash, six in the second. PBY-1 Catalina, BuNo 0142, of VP-4, crashes and sinks ~200 yards offshore at Kaena Point at ~0405 hrs., while en route to scouting station, operating with Fleet Problem #19. Crash believed to be due to low visibility and darkness. Killed are Lt. (jg) Leo O. Crane, USN, pilot; Aviation Cadet William Howard Lear, USNR; Vernon August Luciana, R.M. 2c, USN; Garland Harold O'Neal, A.C.M.M., USN; and Bluitt Iven Windham, A.O.M. 1c, USN. Injured are Herbert Fred Bartz, A.M.M. 1c, USN; and George Joseph Nilles, R.M. 3c, USN. On 31 March, small seaplane tender USS Avocet salvages the wreckage and recovers the body of a radioman.

April
Prototype of the Belgian Renard R.35, one of the first pressurized transports in the world, designed by Albert Renard, crashes on its first take-off, killing Renard chief test pilot George Van Damme.

4 April
Les Ateliers de Constructions Aéronautiques Belges LACAB GR.8, dubbed unofficially the Doryphore by its pilots, "a singularly ugly multi-rôle combat aircraft intended for long-range bombing, and reconnaissance missions, and also as a heavy fighter", crashes during landing, writing off the undercarriage, both starboard wings, and suffering damage to the aft fuselage. The two-bay unequal-span staggered biplane of mixed construction, powered by two Gnôme-Rhône 14Kdrs radial engines, had first flown 14 May 1936, and was taken over by Belgium's Aéronautique Militaire on 2 June 1936 for testing and evaluation. Surprisingly, SABCA was contracted to repair the airframe, although no further testing appears to have been done. The airframe was found in a hangar at Evere in May 1940 by German troops who subsequently scrapped it.

4 April
Bellanca C-27C Airbus, 32-399, c/n 705, ex-NC18797, of the 2d Transport Squadron, 10th Transport Group, out of Middletown Air Depot, Pennsylvania, suffers forced landing at Kylertown, Pennsylvania, after engine failure, suffering moderate damage. Pilot was Isaac W. Ott. Dropped from records at Middletown in February 1939.

11 April
The sole Grumman XF4F-2, Model G-18, BuNo 0383, first flown 2 September 1937, and delivered to NAS Anacostia, Washington, D.C., on 23 December for testing, was plagued by engine overheating and crankshaft failures. Deck handling and catapult trials began at the Naval Aircraft Factory, Philadelphia, on 6 April. An engine stoppage during a simulated deck landing on 11 April led to a rough deadstick forced landing in a Campbell's farm field, across the Delaware River from Mustin Field, that flipped the aircraft over onto its back. The test pilot, Navy Lieutenant Gurney, was not seriously hurt, but the machine was badly damaged and had to be sent back to the factory for repairs. Grumman built a revised airframe using the damaged prototype as a basis, with improvements, designated the XF4F-3.

14 May
First prototype Focke-Wulf Fw 187 V1 Falke, D-AANA, crashes at Bremen, Germany, when test pilot Paul Bauer, having completed test series, makes high-speed run across airfield, pulls up too sharply, stalls, spins in next to the control tower.

28 May
The Bristol 146 was built by Bristol to an Air Ministry order for a prototype single-seat eight-gun fighter meeting F.5/34 issued in 1934. The specification further called for an air-cooled engine for overseas use. The Type 146, K5119, incorporated the experience of metal-skinned monoplanes that Bristol had gained with the earlier Type 133, but was quite different in detail. Delivered to Martlesham in April 1938, it came close to meeting the specified requirements, but was not ordered into production. On this date, following an Empire Air Day display at Filton Aerodrome, the sole Type 146, while taxiing, struck a "set-piece" display and was damaged beyond economic repair. It was the last single-engined fighter to be built by Bristol.

2 July
Curtiss YC-30 Condor, 33-321, c/n 27, of Headquarters Squadron, Maxwell Field, Alabama, collides with another aircraft at Maxwell Field, and is SOC on 20 September 1938. Pilot was Fred C. Nelson.

24 July
At Campo de Marte, Santa Ana, Usaquén, Colombia, a pilot performing an aerobatic display crashes a Curtiss F11C Goshawk into a crowd attending a military review. Sources differ on the number killed and injured; up to 75 died and 100 or more were injured. According to TIME magazine, the pilot, Flt. Lt. Cesar Abadia of the Colombian Air Force, disregarded standing orders not to fly below 500 feet and attempted to dive through a narrow gap between two grandstands. The pilot misjudged his approach and a wingtip hit the Diplomatic stand; the plane then smashed against the Presidential stand and exploded, raining flaming debris down on spectators located between the two grandstands.

September
The Heinkel He 100 V3, D-ISVR, with clipped racing wings and a smaller rounded canopy, moves to Warnemünde for the attempt on 100 km (62 mi) closed circuit speed record this month. On one of the pre-record test flights by the Heinkel chief pilot, Gerhard Nitschke, the main gear fails to extend and ends up stuck half open. Since the aircraft cannot be safely landed it is decided to have Nitschke bail out and let the aircraft crash in a safe spot on the airfield. Gerhard is injured when he hits the tail on the way out, and makes no further record attempts.

21 September
Following the conclusion of its test program, the Hall XPTBH-2, BuNo 9721, was used for experimental duties at the Naval Torpedo Station in Newport, Rhode Island, participating in trials of aerial torpedoes. Its service at Newport came to an end on this date, when the XPTBH-2 was destroyed during the Great New England Hurricane. This was the last design by Hall Aluminum, which was bought out by Consolidated Aircraft in 1940.

21 September
USAAC Chief Maj. Gen. Oscar Westover is killed while on an inspection tour, on a return hop from Vultee Field at Downey, in the crash of Northrop A-17AS, 36-349, c/n 289, '1', assigned at Bolling Field, Washington, D.C., in a crosswind short of the runway at Lockheed Air Terminal in Burbank, California, now known as Bob Hope Airport. The single-engined attack design used as a high-speed staff transport, crashed into a house at 1007 Scott Road in Burbank. Also KWF is his mechanic T/Sgt Samuel Hymes, promoted just five days before. Another source identifies him as Sgt. Samuel Hyne. "The Lockheed field, though long, was narrow, set behind the aircraft factory. A crosswind was blowing and he flew over the field to check its direction. Then, with flaps down, he began his final approach. He had done it thousands of times before; the procedure was routine, and so was his pattern until he began his turn onto final. There was turbulence, tricky winds from off the nearby mountains, thermal currents rising from the sunbaked earth. Oscar Westover, at fifty-five, was not all that sharp a pilot. He stalled the plane in the turn and it whipped into a spin. When he saw he couldn't pull out, his last act was to shut off the power to prevent fire on impact." Northeast Air Base, Massachusetts, renamed Westover Field on 1 December 1939, later Westover AFB on 13 January 1948.

22 September
RAF de Havilland DH. 93 Don, L2391, of the A&AEE, crashes while landing at RAF Martlesham Heath. An overheating engine cuts out on approach and aircraft undershoots, demolishing airframe. L2391, which had first flown on 13 June 1938, suffers a collapsed undercarriage and detached engine, but no crew aboard is seriously injured. This is the only write off of the 50 built. The Don will not last long in service, being replaced by the versatile Avro Anson.

5 October
Blohm & Voss BV 141 V3 asymmetric reconnaissance design, WNr 141-00-0359, D-OLGA, plagued with hydraulic problems, makes forced landing in ploughed field with mainwheel undercarriage legs only partly extended, suffers extensive damage to starboard wing.

11 October
Dornier Do 217 V1, first prototype, first flown 4 October 1938, crashes one week into test programme during a single-engine test, killing both crew members, pilot Rolf Koeppe, a flight commander at Rechlin, and Dornier mechanic, Eugen Bausenhart.

22 October
The Heinkel He 100B V4 flies a number of times before its landing gear collapses while standing on the pad on this date. The aircraft will be rebuilt and returns to flying by March 1939.

Late October
The Heinkel He 100A V2 is damaged on landing at Rechlin when the tail wheel won't extend. It is unclear if the damage was repaired.

8 November
Col. Leslie MacDill, commissioned in the Coast Artillery in 1912, became a military pilot in 1914, and commanded an aerial gunnery school in St. Jean de Monte, France in World War I, is killed this date in the crash of his North American BC-1, 37–670, of the 1st Staff Squadron, at 1807 13th Street, SE, Anacostia, D.C. after take-off from Bolling Field. Southeast Air Base, Tampa, Florida, is renamed MacDill Field on 1 December 1939. Also killed is Private Joseph G. Gloxner. Two other sources gives date of 9 November for accident.

14 November
Private Ben Fliegelman, U.S. Army Air Corps mechanic, of Brooklyn, New York, "borrows" an Air Corps Douglas B-18 Bolo bomber at Honolulu, and takes it on an unauthorized five mile flight before it makes a forced landing in a cane field. Fliegelman is slightly injured. On 31 January 1939, he will be found guilty at court martial of "misappropriating and causing to be damaged a B-18 airplane", and receives a dishonorable discharge and a five year sentence at hard labor at Governor's Island, New York.

18 November
Douglas B-18A Bolo, 37-468, of the 99th Bomb Squadron, on a flight from Mitchel Field, Hempstead, Long Island, New York, to Maxwell Field, Alabama, crashes 7 miles NE of Lagrange, Georgia, in a night accident in rainy weather that blanketed most of the Southeast. Five of six crew, and two military passengers, were killed when the plane struck trees, possibly due to a downdraft. A dying member of the crew provided details of the crash before he expired. Pvt. Joseph Nanartowich said "We were flying low to get under the ceiling. It was raining. Suddenly we hit a rough spot and bounced. Next thing I knew we were plowing through the trees. There were no mechanical defects so far as I could tell." When rescuers reached the burning wreckage, they found Nanartowich and Lt. John D. Madre alive. Madre was still clinging to life, but unconscious the following day. Killed were pilot Robert K. Black, of Meridian, Georgia, Lt. Robert R. McKechnie, of Cleveland, Ohio, Lt. Allen M. Howery, of Russellville, Tennessee, and Sgt. Harry T. Jones, of Hempstead, New York. The passengers were Lt. James W. Stewart, of East Orange, New Jersey, who was returning to his station at Randolph Field, Texas, and Corp. J. E. Galloway, of Sulphur Springs, Texas, who was returning to his station in Dallas. The bomber had been heard circling Lagrange about 2300 hrs. and it was thought that the pilot was seeking an emergency landing field. "Nearly two hours later a colored share cropper made his way through the mud into town and told of the crash near his home.

Post-November
First prototype Dewoitine D.520 fighter, tested from November 1938, is written off when pilot neglects to lower undercarriage.

8 December
The Arado Ar 196 V4, D-OVMB, the second Ar 196B, with a single main float and two outrigger floats, suffers failure of engine mounts during taxi testing at Travemünde for seaworthiness trials. Engine drops down towards centreline float, fire breaks out, crew of two with Helmut Schuster at the controls goes over the starboard side to avoid flames. This test sealed the fate of the center float Ar 196.

== 1939 ==
1939

Dornier Do 215 V1, D-AFFY, wrk. nr. 0001, first flown 29 October 1938, is lost in a crash during trials.
Messerschmitt Bf 109 V17, D-IWKU, prototype of the Bf 109E-3, crashes during test flight.

17 January
Prototype Belgian Renard R-36 fighter, OO-ARW, crashes near Nivelles, killing pilot Lt. Visconte Eric de Spoelberg. Official investigation is inconclusive, no evidence of material failure being discovered. Most probable causes are concluded to be either that radio equipment came loose during a high-G manoeuver, jamming the controls, or that the pilot became incapacitated. Development programme suspended after this accident. Airframe had accumulated 75:30 hours flight time.

19 January
Yugoslav Rogožarski IK-3 prototype, piloted by Capt. Milan Pokorni, fails to recover from terminal velocity dive out of Zemun airfield, destroying airframe. Subsequent investigation exonerates the design and production order for twelve placed.

23 January
Sole prototype Douglas 7B twin-engine attack bomber, designed and built as a company project, suffers loss of vertical fin and rudder during demonstration flight over Mines Field (now Los Angeles International Airport, California), flat spins into parking lot of North American Aviation, burns. Another source states that the test pilot, in an attempt to impress the Gallic passenger, attempted a snap roll at low altitude with one engine feathered, resulting in the fatal spin. Douglas test pilot Johnny Cable bails out at 300 feet, chute unfurls but does not have time to deploy, killed on impact, flight engineer John Parks rides airframe in and dies, but 33-year-old French Air Force Capt. Paul Chemidlin, riding in aft fuselage near top turret, survives with broken leg, severe back injuries, slight concussion. Ten injuries on the ground from flying debris. "The Frenchman was rushed to a nearby hospital. In an effort to maintain the secrecy veiling the flight, Douglas officials said he was a mechanic named Schmidt. The ruse didn't work. The press quickly penetrated Chemidlin's alias and Douglas was faced with admitting that he was a pilot and technical adviser with the French mission." His presence, as a representative of a foreign purchasing mission, causes furor in Congress by isolationists over neutrality and export laws. Type will be developed as Douglas DB-7.

11 February
After cross-country speed flight, Lockheed XP-38 Lightning prototype, 37-457, c/n 022-2201, crashlands on Cold Stream Golf Course on approach to Mitchel Field, Long Island, New York when engines fail due to icing. Pilot Ben Kelsey survives. Attempts by authorities to shield "secret" design from local photographers fail miserably.

20 February
A squadron of twelve U.S. Navy aircraft, types not identified, but described as "fast combat ships", returning to NAS Pensacola, Florida, from a routine training trip on a Monday night, find the Gulf Coast socked in by a fog described as one of the heaviest ever witnessed in the region, and eight planes are lost with two pilots killed. Three aircraft, North American NJ-1s, piloted by instructors, and one other plane, are diverted by radio and outrun the fogbank to land safely at Atmore and Greenville, Alabama. "Six of the Navy's flying students bailed out in the darkness and reached ground safely in their first parachute jumps. Their planes were wrecked beyond repair. Lt. G. F. Presser, Brazilian Navy flyer, in training at the Naval Air Station, crashed and was killed at Corry Field. His plane burned. The fog was so dense that the intense glow of the burning plane could not be seen by attendants on the field. Lt. N. M. Ostergren, U. S. Navy, was found dead at his crashed plane near McDavid the next morning. Both men were married. Officers said the wreckage of the eight planes – they declined to estimate their worth, but aviation circles here said the fast combat ships would cost from $18,000 to $20,000 each – was the air station's second heaviest loss. In 1926 a hurricane wrecked planes on the ground, hangars and other equipment for a total damage of about $1,000,000." All airframes were Boeing F4B-4s. These included BuNos. A9014 (c/n 1631), A9040 (c/n 1649), 9242 (c/n 1758), 9243 (c/n 1759), 9258 (c/n 1774), and 9719 (no c/n – assembled from spares by the U.S. Marine Corps at Marine Corps Base Quantico.)

24 February
A Junkers Ju 52/3mge, D-ALUS, c/n 5210, operated by the Reichsluftfahrtministerium, ferrying Condor Legion pilots back from Spain, crashes into the French Alps during a snowstorm, killing all ten passengers and three crew. Wreckage found 4 March 1939.

22 March
The sole Seversky AP-4, NX2597, c/n 144, a company-funded development of the Seversky P-35 with a turbocharged R-1830 engine, catches fire in flight while being evaluated at Wright Field, Ohio, forcing Seversky chief test pilot Frank Sinclair to bail out. He was burned and bruised, but survived. Seversky spokesmen said that the ship was valued at $250,000. Impressed with the design's climbing ability, the USAAF had placed an order on 12 March 1939 for 13 service test models of the design as Republic YP-43s. Outcome of the evaluation is that the Curtiss P-40 is ordered in quantity.

1 April
During a promotional sales tour of Europe, the Seversky 2PA-202, NX2586, c/n 146, is wrecked after a demonstration in England.

3 April (some sources cite 4 April)
Joaquín García Morato, the leading Spanish Nationalist ace of the Spanish Civil War (credited with over 40 victories over Republican aircraft), is killed in the crash of his Fiat CR.32, 3–51, this date while performing aerobatics for newsreel cameras. While flying inverted at low-level over Griñón airfield, his engine fails. He is posthumously awarded the Individual Medal and promoted to substantive major for meritorious war service.

11 April
The North American NA-40B, NX14221, 'X14221', is destroyed in a crash during USAAC testing at Wright Field, Ohio, when it loses one engine and spins into the ground, according to some accounts. Editors of Aeroplane state that "By early April, the NA-40B's flight programme was almost complete, when on [this date], the bomber was crash landed whilst being flown on a single engine. Instructions had been issued not to fly the NA-40B until the Hamilton Standard propellers had been fitted [to replace a pair of Curtiss electric propellers] but the Army test pilot at the controls failed to adhere to this. The crew managed to escape the aircraft just before it burst into flames and was completely destroyed. With no contract forthcoming and the competition abandoned followed [sic] the loss of the Douglas DB-7 as well, the NAA engineers went back to the drawing board." The type is the most direct predecessor of the Model NA-62 which is ordered into production as the B-25 Mitchell.

29 April
An attempted Great Circle Route long-distance flight by Red Air Force crew V. K. Kokkinaki, pilot, and Mikhail Gordienko, navigator/radio operator, from Tchelkovo Airport (Chkalovsky Airport, a military airport base near Shchyolkovo, Moscow Oblast, located 31 km NE of Moscow), to New York City, in Ilyushin TsKB-30 prototype twin-engined bomber, "Moskva", ends in crash-landing on Miscou Island off New Brunswick, Canada, after battling head winds and bad weather, as well as bitter cold, having achieved 4,970 miles in 22 hours, 56 minutes. Crew is uninjured in wheels-up landing, and receives hero's welcome in New York City.

14 May
Following first flight of the prototype Short S.29 Stirling four-engine bomber, L7600, out of Rochester, Kent, one of the brakes locks, causing it to slew off the runway and collapse the undercarriage, airframe damaged beyond repair.

25 May
Sole Grumman XSBF-1, BuNo. 9996, (the XSF-2 airframe modified with a triangular frame beneath the engine mounting to carry one 500 pounds (230 kg) or two 100 pounds (45 kg) bombs, flown 18 February 1936), crash lands near Leonardtown, Maryland, killing one crew.

9 June
The Heinkel He 100C V6, first flown in February 1939, after some test flights at the factory is flown to Rechlin on 25 April, where it spends most of its time as an engine testbed. On this date, the gear fails in flight, but the pilot manages to land the aircraft with little damage, and it is returned to flying condition in six days.

11 August
Nine Army Air Corps crew are killed in the takeoff crash of Douglas B-18A Bolo, 37-488, of the 21st Reconnaissance Squadron, at Langley Field, Virginia. An engine fails on liftoff and though the pilot tries to glide for the Back River, he stalls, falls short, crashes and burns,

11 August
Two U.S. Navy aviators are killed in the crash of their bomber during gunnery practice at Miramar Field, north of San Diego. Killed when the plane crashes and burns are Ens. T. R. Wood, USNR, 28, of Tacoma, Washington, and Radioman (1-C) V. P. Armstrong, 33, of Bristol, Pennsylvania. Wood's widow lives in Coronado, California, and his father, J. W. Wood Sr., in Tacoma. "The navy plane was attached to bombing squadron 3 of the navy aircraft carrier Saratoga." Curtiss SBC-3 Helldiver, BuNo 0541, crashed this date; SOC on 30 September 1939.

15 August
Neuhammer Stuka disaster (de): Thirteen Junkers Ju 87 B-1s of 1 Gruppe, 76 Sturmkampfgeschwader, commanded by Captain Walter Sigel, crash during an early morning demonstration over the training area at Neuhammer (now Świętoszów, Poland). All 26 crew members were killed. The planes dived through cloud, expecting to release their practice bombs and pull out of the dive once below the cloud ceiling, unaware that on that particular day the ceiling was too low and unexpected ground mist formed, leaving them no time to pull out of the dive.

1 September
Second prototype Saro S.36 Lerwick twin-engine flying boat, L7249, sinks at pierside mooring at Felixstowe, Suffolk, when, after flight test at the Marine Aircraft Experimental Establishment (MAEE), a hatch is left improperly secured; attempt by crew to save it fails as it had already shipped too much water – salvaged for static tests only.

4 September
Supermarine Type 300, the prototype Spitfire to F.37/34, K5054, is wrecked when Flt. Lt. "Spinner" White misjudges his landing approach at Farnborough, bouncing several times before fighter noses over onto its back. Pilot dies in hospital four days later. Spitfire is not repaired.

12 September
Polish LWS-3 Mewa, (reported in some sources as evacuated to Bulgaria at outbreak of war), crashed this date during evening landing near Przemyśl.

16 September (some sources cite 17 September)
Soviet ace (18 victories) of the Spanish Civil War, Sergey Gritsevets, assigned to act as an adviser in a fighter brigade at Orsha for the invasion of Poland on 17 September, is killed this date in a landing accident. At 1907 hrs., three Polikarpov I-16s took off for Bolbasovo. When they landed at 1950 hrs., Gritsevets was killed when Major Petr I. Khara’s (also a veteran from Spain) aircraft stalled whilst landing and crashing into Gritsevets, who was taxiing on the airfield at Bolbasovo. Khara survived the crash.

17 September
Polish LWS-3 Mewa destroyed near Stanisławów in SE Poland (now in Ukraine) due to fuel shortage.

25 September
Blackburn B-24 Skua crewed by Lt. Bruce Straton McEwan, RN, and Petty Officer B. M. Seymour of No. 803 Squadron, launched from HMS Ark Royal, becomes the first British fighter to down a German aircraft in World War II when they attack a Dornier Do 18 flying boat over the North Sea.

Post 31 October
Focke-Wulf Fw 190 V2, first armed prototype, first flown 31 October, suffers crankshaft failure of BMW-139 engine after only 50 hours of test flying, crashes at Rechlin, Germany.

Circa 30 November
On second test flight of first Bell YFM-1 Airacuda, 38-486, disaster narrowly avoided when supercharger turbine buckets on starboard engine disintegrate, throwing shrapnel through fuselage, resulting in considerable damage. Pilot shuts down engine and lands safely at Bell plant, Buffalo, New York, using only port powerplant.

10 December
Second production Sud-Est LeO H-470, E11-2, c/n 2, flying boat written off when pilot alighted in error in shallow water on Lake Urbino, Corsica, airframe too badly damaged to permit repairs.

== See also ==
- List of accidents and incidents involving military aircraft
