= Kashimura =

Kashimura (written: 樫村 or 橿村, lit. "oak village") is a Japanese surname. Notable people with the surname include:

- Kanichi Kashimura (樫村 寛一, 1913–1943), Imperial Japanese Navy officer
- Katsufusa Kashimura (樫村 勝房, born 1942), Japanese sprint canoeist
