= Curtiss O-40 Raven =

American Observation Aircraft

O-40 Raven
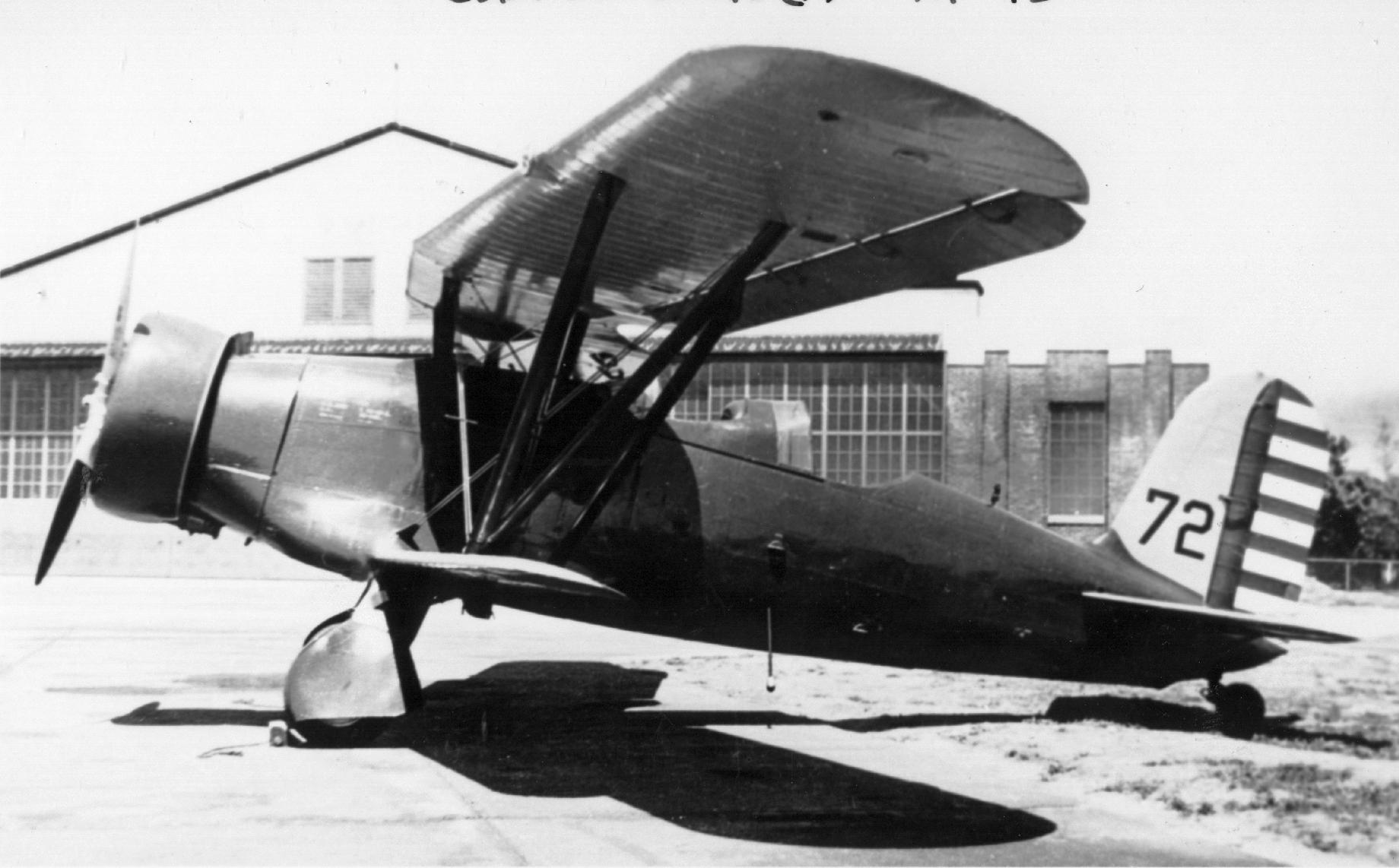
- The original prototype YO-40

General information
- Type: Observation aircraft
- National origin: United States of America
- Manufacturer: Curtiss-Wright
- Primary user: United States Army Air Corps
- Number built: 5

History
- Introduction date: 1933
- First flight: 1932
- Retired: 1939

The Curtiss O-40 Raven was an American observation aircraft of the 1930s which was built and used in small numbers. A single example of the YO-40, a single-engined Sesquiplane with a retractable undercarriage was built, followed by four examples of a modified monoplane version, the O-40B, which remained in use until 1939.

== Development and design ==
In 1931, in response to a United States Army Air Corps requirement for a new observation aircraft, Curtiss designed the Model 62, a single-engined biplane with the lower wing much smaller than the upper, known as a sesquiplane (i.e. "one-and-a-half wings"), while the outer panels of the upper wings were swept back to avoid centre-of-gravity problems. It was of all-metal construction, with a monocoque fuselage and had a retractable tailwheel undercarriage with inwards retracting mainwheels, and was powered by a Wright Cyclone radial engine. The crew of two sat in tandem in open cockpits.

A prototype, designated YO-40, flew in February 1932. Although it crashed in May that year, it was rebuilt with stronger wings and an enclosed cockpit as the YO-40A. A further four YO-40As were ordered, but they were redesigned as monoplanes by removing the lower wing, the resultant aircraft being designated Y1O-40B.

== Operational history ==
The four Y1O-40Bs were delivered in June 1933, and after service tests, were redesignated O-40B, being operated by the 1st Observation Squadron of the USAAC. While the aircraft's performance and manoeuvrability were good, the Air Corps was disappointed with the cockpit arrangements and the low fuel capacity, and no more orders followed. The last O-40B was withdrawn from use in 1939.

== Variants ==
YO-40
Prototype powered by 653 hp (487 kW) Wright R-1820E Cyclone engine.
YO-40A
YO-40 rebuilt with stronger wings and enclosed cockpit. Scrapped 1938.
Y1O-40B
Monoplane derivative with lower wing removed. Powered by 670 hp (500 kW) R-1820-27. Four built.
O-40B
Redesignation of Y1O-40B.

== Operators ==
United States

- United States Army Air Corps
  - 1st Observation Squadron

== Specifications (O-40B) ==
Data from Curtiss Aircraft 1907–1947

General characteristics

- Crew: two
- Length: 28 ft 10 in (8.79 m)
- Wingspan: 41 ft 8 in (12.70 m)
- Height: 10 ft 8 in (3.25 m)
- Wing area: 266 sq ft (24.7 m^{2})
- Empty weight: 3,754 lb (1,703 kg)
- Gross weight: 5,180 lb (2,350 kg)
- Powerplant: 1 × Wright R-1820-27 Cyclone 9-cylinder air-cooled radial engine, 670 hp (500 kW)

Performance

- Maximum speed: 187.7 mph (302.1 km/h, 163.1 kn)
- Cruise speed: 160.5 mph (258.3 km/h, 139.5 kn)
- Stall speed: 62 mph (100 km/h, 54 kn)
- Range: 324 mi (521 km, 282 nmi)
- Service ceiling: 23,100 ft (7,000 m)
- Rate of climb: 1,660 ft/min (8.4 m/s)

Armament

- Guns: 1× fixed forward firing .30 in machine gun and 1× .30 in machine gun in observers cockpit
