= Junkers EF 61 =

EF 61
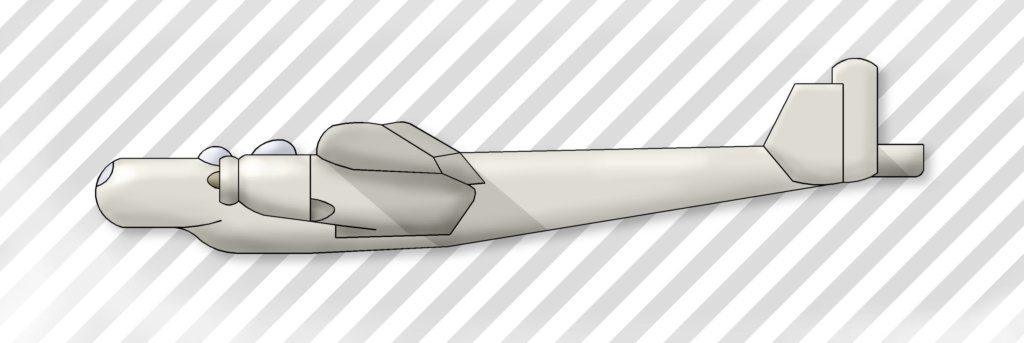

General information
- Type: Bomber
- Manufacturer: Junkers
- Status: Prototype
- Primary user: Luftwaffe
- Number built: 2

History
- First flight: 4 March 1937
- Developed from: Junkers Ju 49

The Junkers EF 61 was a German prototype twin-engined high-altitude bomber aircraft of the 1930s. Only two examples were built, but it provided valuable information on pressure cabins which aided the design of later pressurised aircraft.

== Design and development ==
The pressurised cabin of the Junkers EF 61 was based on that of the Junkers Ju 49. The EF 61 was one of the few German high-altitude bomber and reconnaissance projects before World War II. The project started in September 1935 and the maiden flight took place on 4 March 1937, but on 19 September of that year the EF 61 V1 was destroyed in a crash. The second prototype EF 61 V2 was ready in late 1937 but also crashed in December 1937, even before high-altitude testing had started. After that the project was abandoned. The project eventually led to the high-altitude reconnaissance aircraft of the Junkers Ju 86 type in World War II.

== Specifications ==
Data from

General characteristics

- Crew: 2
- Length: 14.34 m (47 ft 1 in)
- Wingspan: 27 m (88 ft 7 in)
- Wing area: 65 m^{2} (700 sq ft)
- Powerplant: 2 × Daimler-Benz DB 600A V-12 inverted liquid-cooled direct fuel injection piston engines, 670 kW (900 hp) each

Performance

- Maximum speed: 350 km/h (220 mph, 190 kn) at 12,400 m (40,682 ft)
- Range: 6,000 km (3,700 mi, 3,200 nmi) planned
- Service ceiling: 15,000 m (49,000 ft) minimum

Armament

- Guns: provision for a single MG15 machine gun
- Bombs: internal bomb bay for 4 x 250 kg (551 lb) bombs

== Book ==
- Hitler's Luftwaffe: A Pictorial History and Technical Encyclopedia of Hitler's Air Power in World War II (Hardcover)
