= Kanichi Kashimura =

- 樫村 寛一
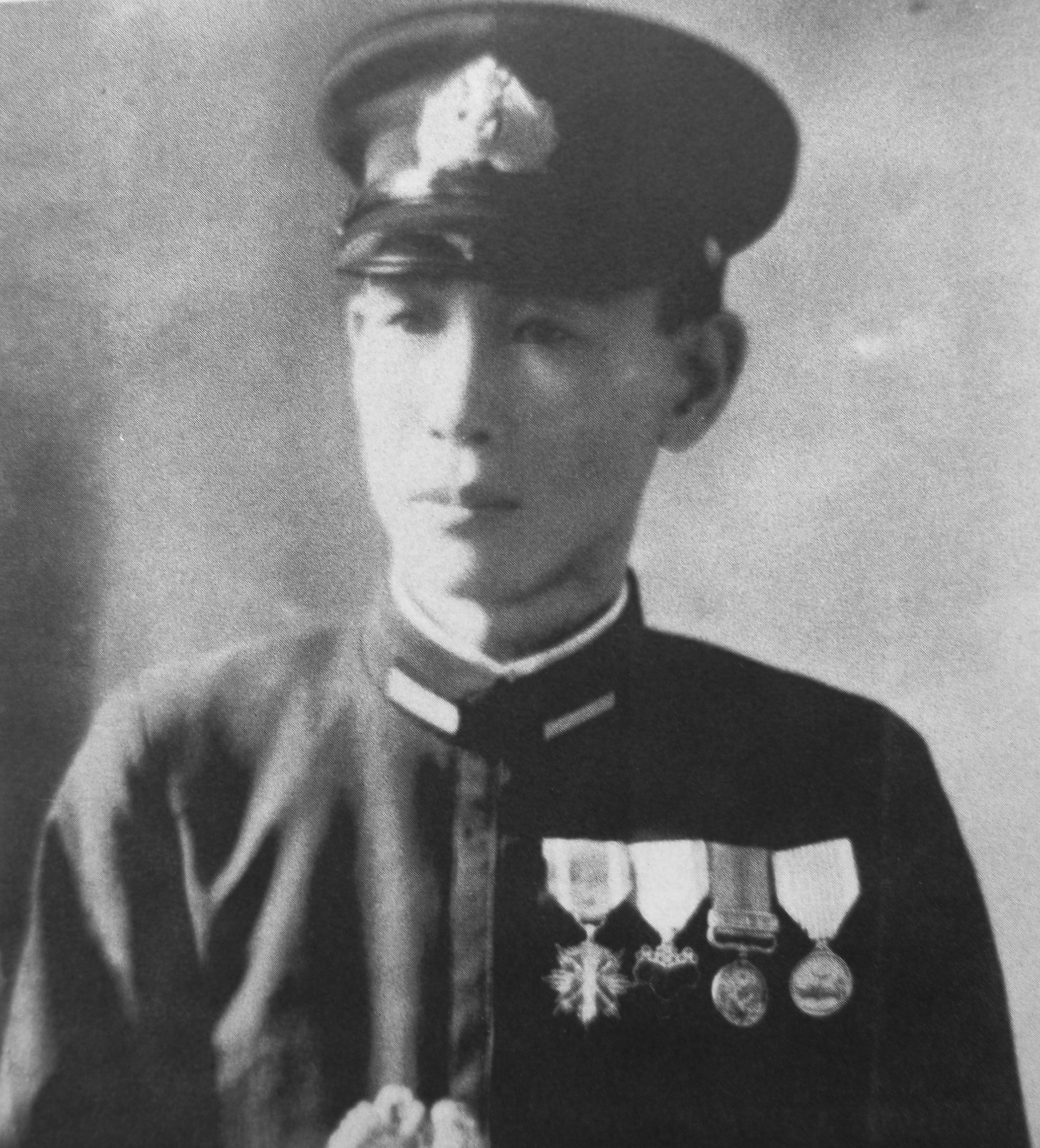
- Born: July 5, 1913; Zentsūji, Kagawa, Japan
- Died: March 6, 1943 (aged 29); Pacific Ocean
- Military career
- Service years: 1933–1943
- Rank: Sub-lieutenant (posthumous)
- Nickname: One Wing
- Units: 13th Air Group; 582nd Air Group
- Conflicts: Second Sino-Japanese War; World War II
- Awards: Order of the Golden Kite 5th Class

Kanichi Kashimura (樫村 寛一, Kashimura Kan'ichi; July 5, 1913 – March 6, 1943) was an Imperial Japanese Navy Naval Ace of the Second Sino-Japanese and Second World War.

On December 9, 1937, Kashimura fought Hawk III over Nan- chang, destroying one and then colliding with another aircraft (an unknown type that could have been either Japanese or Chinese), tearing off a third of his left wing. Through superb piloting, the calm aviator brought his crippled Claude' back to base, and after four landing attempts, the aircraft somersaulted on touching the ground on its fourth approach and lost its tail in the subsequent crash. Astoundingly, the pilot walked away from the wreckage unharmed. Local news reporters quickly sent the story back to Japan, where Kashimura gained instant fame.

On March 6, 1943 he was shot down and killed by a US aircraft near the Russell Islands.

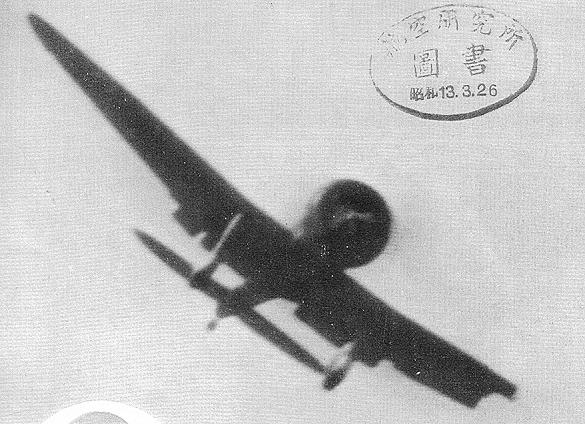
Kashimura's Mitsubishi A5M December 9, 1937

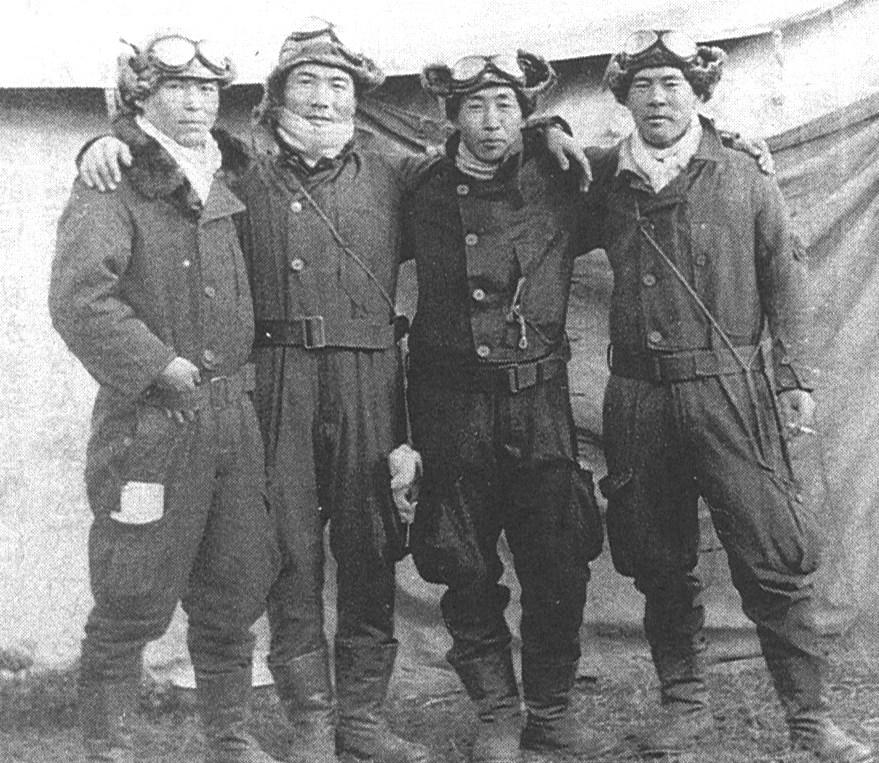
Kashimura (second from right)
