= VA174 =

VA-174 or VA 174 may refer to:

- VA-174 (U.S. Navy), an aviation unit of the United States Navy
- VA-174 (U.S. Navy, 1966-1988), a second unrelated squadron
- Virginia State Route 174, a road in the Commonwealth of Virginia, USA
