= VA-85 =

VA-85 may refer to:

- VA-85 (U.S. Navy), a U.S. Navy attack squadron 1948-1949
- Second VA-85 (U.S. Navy), a U.S. Navy attack squadron 1953-1994
- Virginia State Route 85 (disambiguation)
