= Model 33 =

Model 33 may refer to:

- the Teletype Model 33, a teleprinter

== Aircraft ==
- the Beech Model 33, an airplane
- the Consolidated Model 33, an airplane
- the Rutan Model 33 VariEze, an airplane
- the Temco Model 33 Plebe, an airplane
- the Fleetwings 33, an airplane

== Arms ==
- the Vz. 33, a firearm
- the Tokarev TT33, a firearm
- the Tančík vz. 33, an armoured vehicle
