= Curtiss XBT2C =

1945 torpedo bomber aircraft prototype series by Curtiss

XBT2C
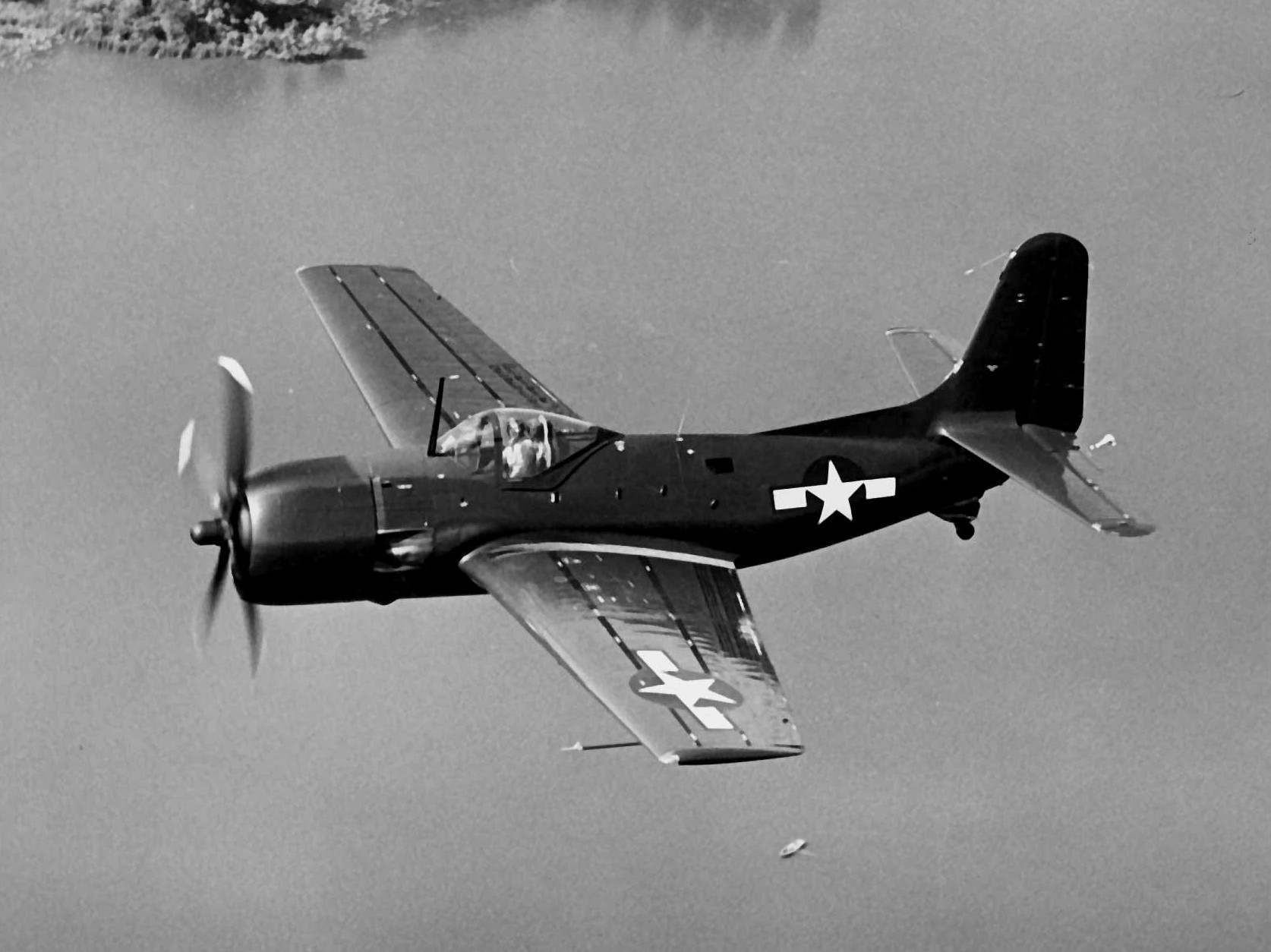
- A XBT2C-1 aircraft in flight over a river

General information
- Type: Torpedo/dive bomber
- National origin: United States
- Manufacturer: Curtiss Aeroplane and Motor Company
- Number built: 9

History
- First flight: 7 August 1945
- Developed from: Curtiss SB2C Helldiver

The Curtiss XBT2C was a prototype two-seat, single-engined dive/torpedo bomber developed during World War II for the United States Navy. Derived from the Curtiss SB2C Helldiver dive bomber, it was an unsuccessful competitor to meet a 1945 Navy specification for an aircraft to combine the roles that previously required separate types. Unlike the other competitors, the XBT2C was designed to accommodate a radar operator.

== Design and development ==
In the 1930s and early 1940s, the Navy divided carrier-borne bombers into two types: the torpedo bomber and the dive bomber, each with crews of two or three men. Wartime experience showed that pilots could aim bombs and torpedoes without assistance from other crewmembers as well as navigate with the aid of radio beacons and the development of more powerful engines meant that faster aircraft no longer needed a rear gunner for self-defense. Furthermore, the consolidation of the two types of bombers greatly increased the flexibility of a carrier's air group and allowed the number of fighters in an air group to be increased.

Curtiss had been proposing changes to improve the Curtiss SB2C Helldiver two-seat dive bomber almost since the aircraft had entered production in 1942, but the Navy rejected those that might adversely impact production. The company submitted a proposal in August 1944 for a redesigned single-seat dive/torpedo bomber version of the Helldiver with the more powerful Wright R-3350 Duplex-Cyclone radial engine to meet a competition for this class of aircraft, but this was rejected because it was not deemed a significant enough improvement to warrant interrupting production. Six months later Curtiss submitted a reworked proposal that included a bubble canopy, a streamlined fuselage and empennage, and carried a second crew member in the rear fuselage to operate the radar, which was mounted in a pod under the starboard wing. To speed development and ease production, the XBT2C retained much of the Helldiver's wing and fuselage structure.

The Navy issued Detail Specification SD-394A on 29 January 1945 for the XBT2C-1 that matching Curtiss' proposal and followed it up with a contract for ten prototypes the following month. Only nine aircraft were ultimately completed as the engine cowling, wings and empennage of the tenth aircraft was fitted to one of the Curtiss XSB2C-6 prototypes instead. Sharing about half of its parts with the Helldiver, construction of the first aircraft was relatively quick and it made its first flight on 7 August.

== Description ==
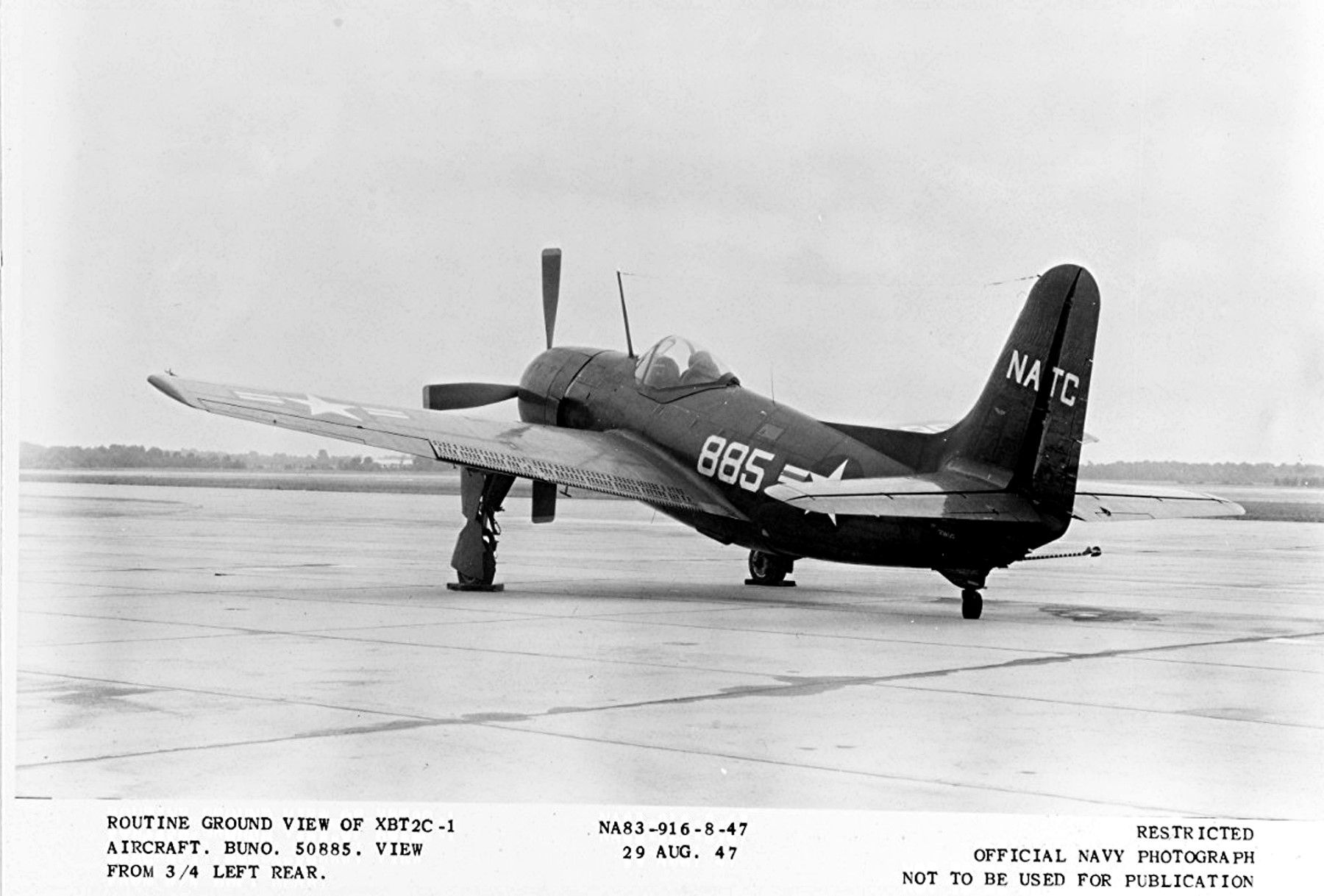
Rear three-quarters view of a XBT2C-1 on the ground

Like the Helldiver, the XBT2C was a low-wing monoplane with retractable conventional landing gear, although its more powerful R-3350 engine required a larger 13-foot-8-inch (4.17 m) propeller. Unable to alter the wheel wells that the aircraft inherited from the Helldiver, Curtiss used a telescoping oleo strut mechanism to provide the necessary additional length of the landing gear. The extra height of the landing gear would have increased the height of the aircraft so that it could no longer fit inside the hangars of the Essex-class aircraft carriers with its wings folded until most of the wing tip outside the aileron was removed to reduce the height to 16 ft 8 in (5.1 m). For comparison purposes, the Navy demanded an engine cooling fan, much like those used by various Japanese aircraft, be installed. Trials showed that the fan eliminated the need for the cowl flaps traditionally needed to cool the engine and its accessories.

The XBTC used the same fuel tanks as the Helldiver with the addition of 45-US-gallon (170 L; 37 imp gal) tanks. This increased the aircraft's total internal fuel supply to 410 US gallons (1,600 L; 340 imp gal) divided between a 110-US-gallon (420 L; 92 imp gal) fuselage tank and interconnected wing tanks of 105-US-gallon (400 L; 87 imp gal) and 45-US-gallon capacity. All of the tanks were self-sealing. The XBTC could carry an additional 300 US gallons (1,100 L; 250 imp gal) of fuel in three drop tanks. One could be fitted to the center shackle in the bomb bay and the others positioned on the main wing hardpoints.

The armament of the XBT2C consisted of two 20 mm (0.8 in) autocannon in the inner wing panel, each with 200 rounds. The bomb bay contained seven shackles of which the center shackle could handle ordnance up to 2,000 lb (910 kg) in weight; when this was fully loaded, no other ordnance would be carried. It was designed to accommodate 1,600 lb (730 kg) semi-armor-piercing bombs, 2000-lb high-explosive bombs, a torpedo (such as the Mark 13) or the 11.75-inch (298 mm) Tiny Tim rocket. To avoid blast damage from the rocket exhaust, the Tiny Tims were dropped like a bomb; their motors only ignited when they fell far enough away to pull a lanyard attached to the aircraft. The shackle was flanked by two others that were rated for 1,000-pound (450 kg) bombs. All three of these shackles were provided with trapezes to swing the bombs clear of the propeller in a dive. The other four shackles could not be used in diving attacks and were limited to 260 lb (120 kg) apiece. The primary wing hardpoints between the landing gear and the wing-folding mechanism were stressed to carry weapons weighing up to 2,000 pounds. The outer wing panels were each provided with four smaller hardpoints rated at 260 pounds and could be used with rockets up to 5-inch (127 mm) in size or bombs. The XBT2C was limited to a total weight of external stores, including the wing pylons, to 4,890 lb (2,220 kg).

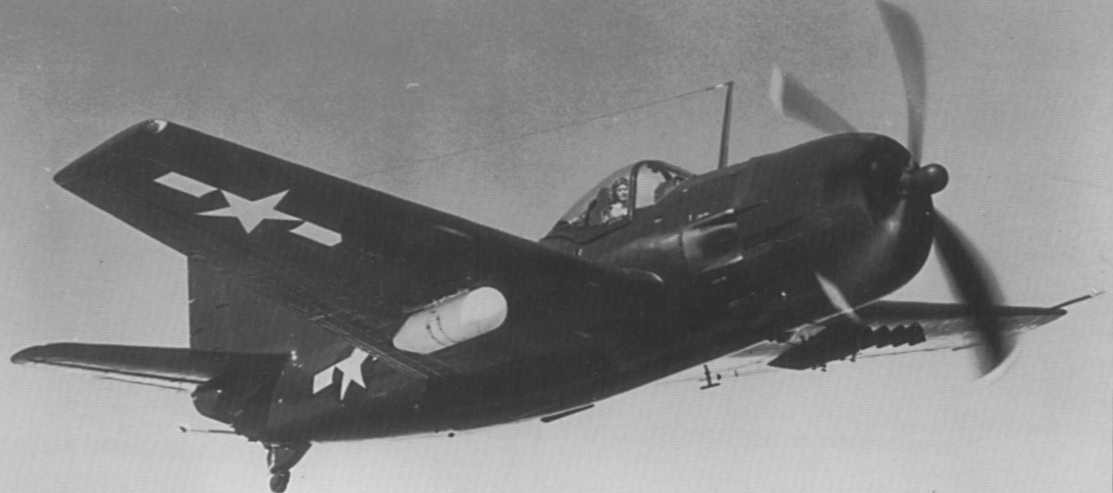
Close-range underside view of a XBT2C-1, showing the AN/APS-4 radar pod

The compartment in the rear fuselage for the radar operator was fitted with a rear-facing seat, two small windows and a hatch in the side of the fuselage. He operated an AN/APS-4 search radar that had its transceiver and antenna housed in a streamlined pod on the starboard wing's primary hardpoint. It was designed as a surface-search radar, capable of detecting a ship at a range of 30 mi (48 km), but had a limited capability to detect aircraft (5 mi (8.0 km)). To balance aerodynamic drag on the aircraft, the port wing primary hardpoint usually carried a 100-US-gallon drop tank.

== Evaluation and fates ==
The nine completed aircraft were delivered to the Navy over the course of 1946 where they were evaluated through 1947. The surviving documentation of the testing is incomplete, but the XBT2C-1 was judged inferior to the Douglas XBT2D during comparative torpedo dropping trials and less easy to maintain than the Grumman TBF Avenger torpedo bomber. While the conclusion of the carrier-suitability report has not survived, one of its sections stated that landing trials revealed that performance with external stores "was critical from a power reserve standpoint" and that "the plane does not accelerate fast enough to climb more than a few feet and is unable to make the customary left turn to clear the flight deck" when given a late wave off by the landing signal officer. While their activities after the conclusion of testing are unknown, all were scrapped in the late 1940s.

== Operators ==
United States

- United States Navy

== Specifications (XBT2C-1) ==
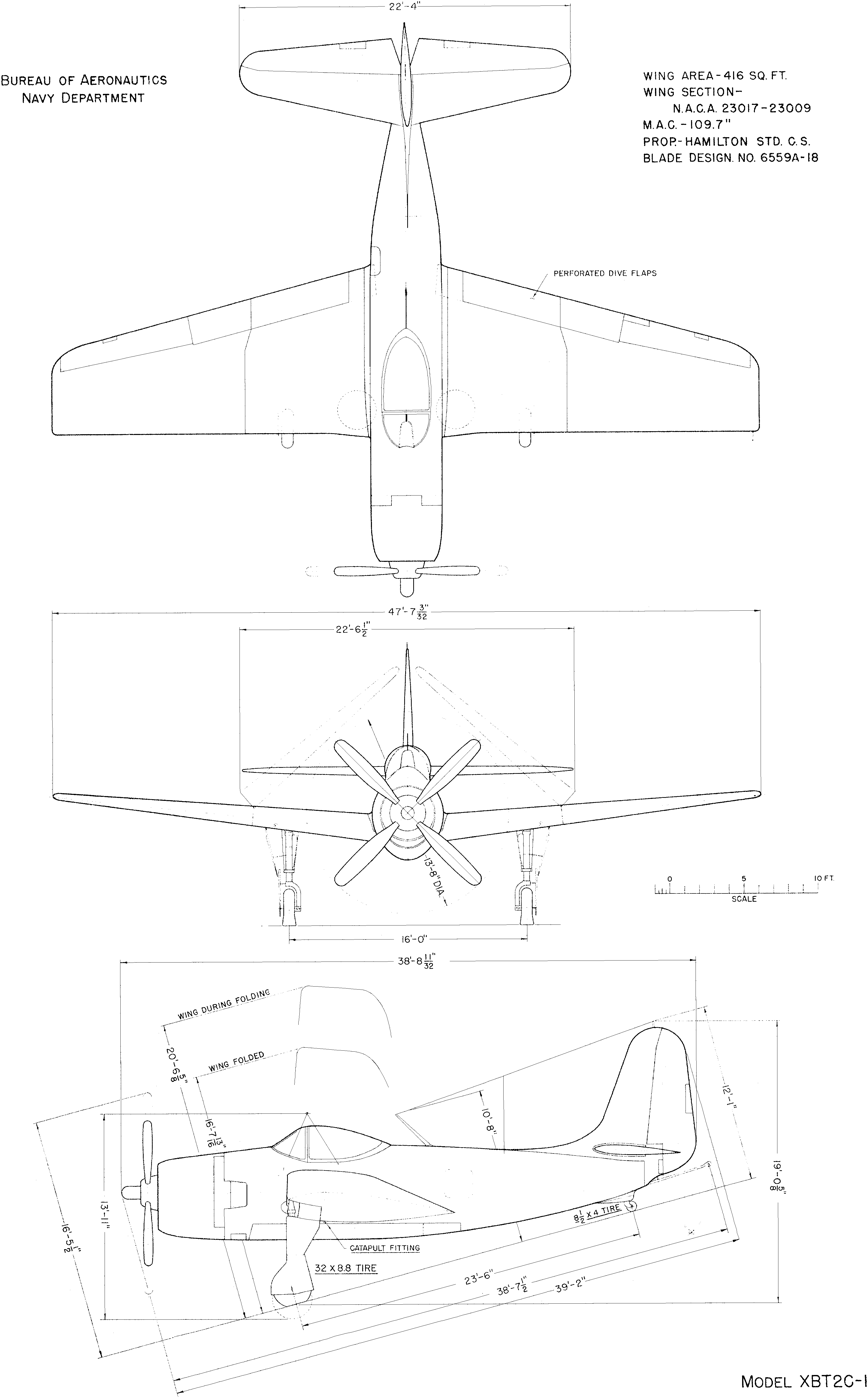
3-view line drawing of the Curtiss XBT2C-1

Data from Curtiss Aircraft 1907–1947; Curtiss XBT2C-1 Bomber / Torpedo Aircraft Prototype

General characteristics

- Crew: 2
- Length: 39 ft 2 in (11.94 m)
- Wingspan: 47 ft 7 in (14.50 m)
- Width: 22 ft 6.5 in (6.871 m) wings folded
- Height: 12 ft 1 in (3.68 m)
- Height wings folded: 16 ft 8 in (5.08 m)
- Maximum height during folding: 20 ft 7 in (6.27 m)
- Wing area: 416 sq ft (38.6 m^{2})
- Airfoil: root: NACA 23017 mod.; tip : NACA 23009
- Empty weight: 12,268 lb (5,565 kg)
- Gross weight: 19,022 lb (8,628 kg)
- Fuel capacity: 410 US gallons (1,600 L; 340 imp gal), plus up to 300 US gallons (1,100 L; 250 imp gal) in drop tanks
- Powerplant: 1 × Wright R-3350-24 Duplex-Cyclone 18-cylinder air-cooled radial piston engine, 2,500 hp (1,900 kW)
- Propellers: 4-bladed Hamilton Standard, 13 ft 8 in (4.17 m) diameter constant-speed propeller

Performance

- Maximum speed: 297 mph (478 km/h, 258 kn) at sea level

349 mph (303 kn; 562 km/h) at 17,000 ft (5,200 m)

- Cruise speed: 175 mph (282 km/h, 152 kn)
- Range: 1,435 mi (2,309 km, 1,247 nmi) (with torpedo)
- Service ceiling: 28,100 ft (8,600 m)
- Rate of climb: 2,590 ft/min (13.2 m/s)

Armament

- Guns: 2 × 20 mm (0.8 in) AN/M2 cannon with 200 rounds per gun
- Rockets: 8 × 5 in (127 mm) rockets under wing
- Bombs: 1 × 2,000 lb (910 kg) and 2 × 1,000 lb (450 kg) or 2 × torpedoes

Avionics
Search radar under starboard wing

== See also ==
Related development

- Curtiss SB2C Helldiver

Aircraft of comparable role, configuration, and era

- Douglas AD Skyraider
- Martin AM Mauler
- Kaiser-Fleetwings XBTK

Related lists

- List of attack aircraft
- List of United States Navy aircraft designations (pre-1962)
