= Fleetwings =

Defunct American aircraft company

Kaiser-Fleetwings
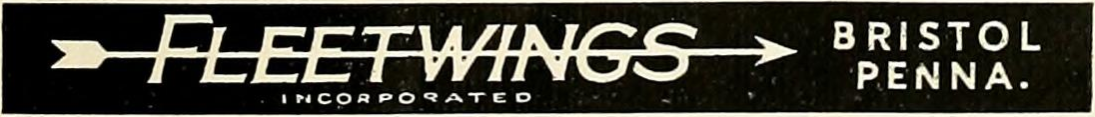
- Formerly: Fleetwings
- Industry: Aerospace
- Founded: 1929
- Defunct: 1940s (?)
- Fate: Defunct
- Successor: Kaiser Metal Products
- Headquarters: Bristol, Pennsylvania, United States
- Key people: Henry J. Kaiser
- Parent: Kaiser Industries

Fleetwings, later Kaiser-Fleetwings, was an American aircraft company of the 1930s and 1940s.

== History ==
Fleetwings started in 1926 (under a different name) as a business based on a patented mechanical timing device, which proved particularly suited to controlling automated welding equipment. After developing the additional capacity to offer welding services, it pursued research and technology specifically related to the welding of stainless steel. In 1929, the company reorganized as Fleetwings, Inc., in Garden City, New York, to develop stainless-steel aircraft structures.

The company progressed to manufacturing components for other aircraft manufacturers, including ribs and control surfaces for the Ireland "Privateer" amphibian, and ribs, flaps and tail surfaces for Grover Loening Aircraft Company, and moved to a larger location in a hangar on lower Roosevelt Field, Long Island. In 1934, it purchased the former Keystone Aircraft facility on the Delaware River in Bristol, Pennsylvania, and moved its operations there. The corporate structure of Fleetwings, Inc., was dominated by the de Ganahl family. In the mid-1930s, its board of directors included Carl de Ganahl, Charles F. de Ganahl, Chloe de Ganahl, Joe de Ganahl and Frank de Ganahl. During the company's history, Carl, Cecil and Frank de Ganahl each served as President at various times.

The company became Kaiser-Fleetwings in when it was purchased in March, 1943, by Henry J. Kaiser's Kaiser Industries. Kaiser-Fleetwings' entered its XBTK-1 in a United States Navy attack aircraft competition, with five aircraft being flown. The contract went to the Douglas AD-1 Skyraider and the Martin AM Mauler.

By 1951, it was being suggested that aviation operations at the company had ceased. The Kaiser-Fleetwings Co. still existed as late as 1960, when it manufactured the launch canister for the Echo 1 balloon satellite at its Bristol factory. The plant was closed in 1962 and demolished, to make way for housing development.

== Aircraft ==
Model name	First flight	Number built	Type
Fleetwings 33	1940	1	Single engine monoplane trainer
Fleetwings Sea Bird	1936	6	Single engine monoplane flying boat utility airplane
Fleetwings BT-12 Sophomore	1939	25	Single engine monoplane trainer
Fleetwings PQ-12		9	Single engine monoplane aerial target
Fleetwings BQ-1	1944	1	Flying bomb
Fleetwings BQ-2	1943	1	Flying bomb
Kaiser-Fleetwings A-39	N/A	0	Unbuilt single engine monoplane attack airplane
Kaiser-Fleetwings BTK	1945	5	Single engine monoplane torpedo bomber

== See also ==
- Budd Company
- Columbia Aircraft Corporation
