= VA-84 (U.S. Navy) =

Attack Squadron 84
- Active: 15 September 1948 – 29 November 1949
- Country: United States
- Branch: United States Navy
- Type: Attack

Aircraft flown
- Attack: TBM Avenger; AM-1 Mauler

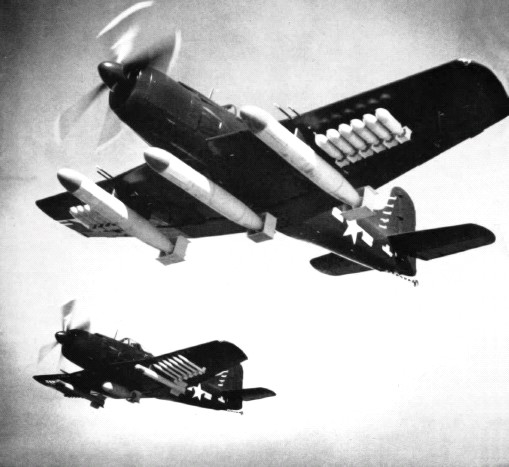
Two AM-1 Maulers similar to those flown by VA-84. The plane in the foreground is armed with bombs and three torpedoes, the plane in the background is carrying twelve 5" HVAR rockets under the wings, two Tiny Tim rockets, and a bomb on the centerline station.

VA-84 was a short-lived Attack Squadron of the United States Navy. It was established on 15 September 1948 and disestablished on 29 November 1949. The squadron's nickname is the Maulers.

== Home port assignments ==
The squadron was assigned to these home ports, effective on the dates shown:

- NAS Oceana – 15 Sep 1948
- NAS Jacksonville – 5 November 1948

== Aircraft assignment ==
The squadron first received the following aircraft on the dates shown:

- TBM-3E Avenger – Nov 1948
- AM-1 Mauler – 20 Nov 1948

== See also ==
- Attack aircraft
- List of inactive United States Navy aircraft squadrons
- History of the United States Navy
