= Fleetwings Sea Bird =

Sea Bird
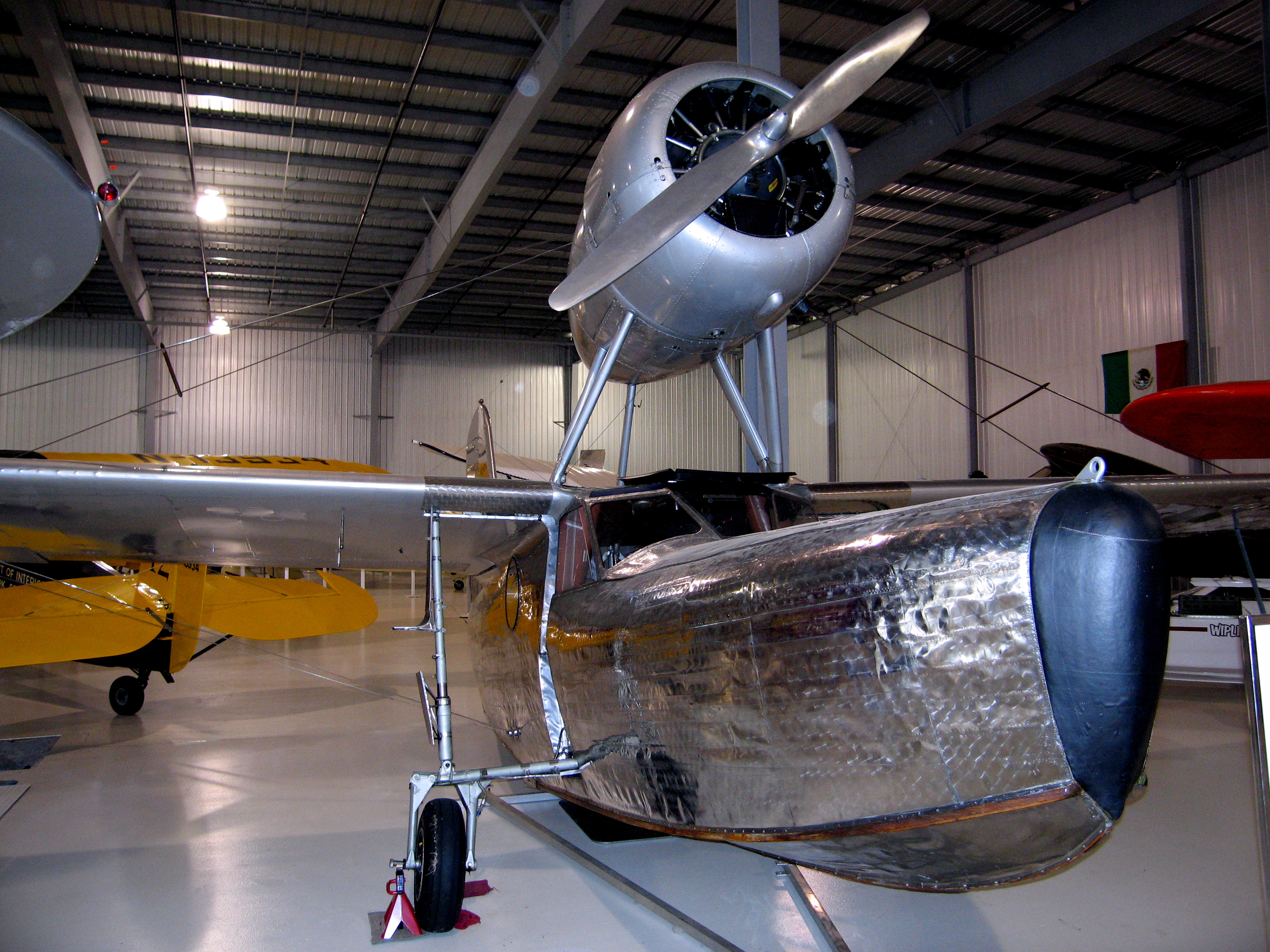
- F-401 prototype, Golden Wings Museum, Blaine, Minnesota

General information
- Type: Amphibious utility aircraft
- National origin: United States
- Manufacturer: Fleetwings
- Designer: James C. Reddig
- Number built: 1 prototype; 5 production

History
- First flight: 1936

The Fleetwings Sea Bird (or Seabird) was an American-built amphibious aircraft of the 1930s.

== Design and production ==
The Sea Bird was an amphibious utility aircraft designed under contract in 1934–1935 by James C. Reddig for Fleetwings, Inc., of Bristol, Pennsylvania. While the aircraft's basic configuration had a precedent in the design of the Loening "Monoduck" developed by the Grover Loening Aircraft Company as a personal aircraft for Mr. Loening (for whom Reddig worked from 1925 to 1933), the Sea Bird was unusual because of its construction from spot-welded stainless steel. It was a high-wing, wire-braced monoplane with its engine housed in a nacelle mounted above the wings on struts. The pilot and passengers sat in a fully enclosed cabin. Fleetwings initially planned to manufacture 50 production units, but at a price approaching $25,000 during the Depression, there proved to be no sustainable market.

== Operational history ==
The Sea Bird found use with private pilot owners and saw service with the oil support industry in Louisiana, including operation by J. Ray McDermott & Co.

== Variants ==
- F-4 Sea Bird - 4-seat prototype (1 built)
- F-5 Sea Bird - 5-seat production aircraft (5 built)

== Specifications ==
Data from Specifications of American Airplanes

General characteristics

- Crew: 1
- Capacity: 3 passengers
- Length: 31 ft 5 in (9.58 m)
- Wingspan: 40 ft 6 in (12.34 m)
- Height: 12 ft 6 in (3.81 m)
- Wing area: 235 sq ft (21.8 m^{2})
- Empty weight: 2,320 lb (1,052 kg)
- Gross weight: 3,450 lb (1,565 kg)
- Fuel capacity: 52 US gal (43 imp gal; 200 L)
- Powerplant: 1 × Jacobs L-5 7-cylinder air-cooled radial engine, 285 hp (213 kW)

Performance

- Maximum speed: 150 mph (240 km/h, 130 kn) at sea level
- Cruise speed: 133 mph (214 km/h, 116 kn)
- Range: 400 mi (640 km, 350 nmi)
- Service ceiling: 15,000 ft (4,600 m)
- Rate of climb: 900 ft/min (4.6 m/s)
