= Kaiser-Fleetwings A-39 =

1940s American attack aircraft project

XA-39
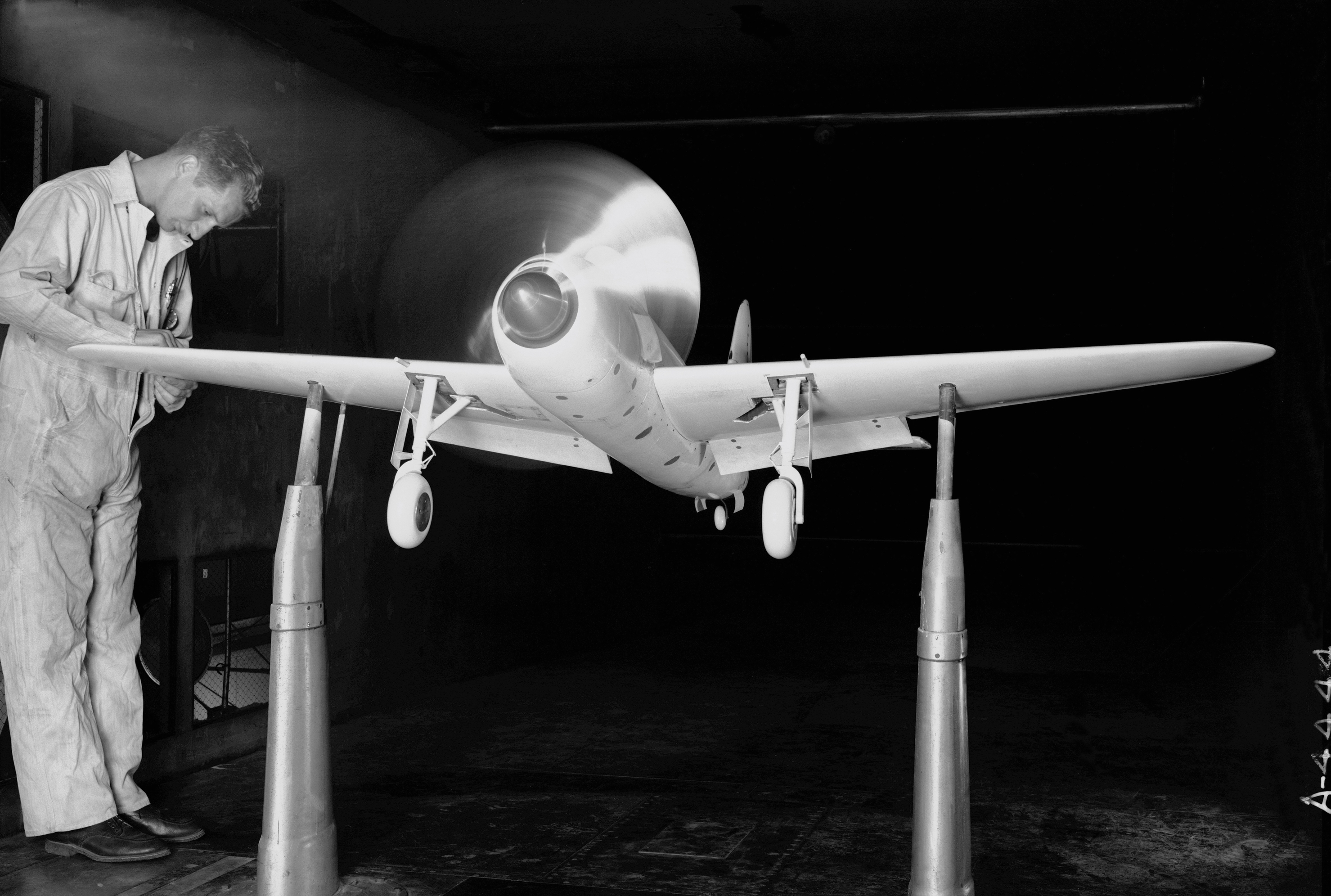
- XA-39 model mounted for testing in the wind tunnel at the Ames Research Center

General information
- Type: Ground-attack aircraft
- National origin: United States
- Manufacturer: Kaiser-Fleetwings
- Primary user: United States Army Air Forces
- Number built: 0

The Kaiser-Fleetwings A-39 was a project by Kaiser-Fleetwings in the 1942–1943 period for an attack aircraft powered by a single Pratt & Whitney R-2800 radial engine. It was to be armed with four .50 caliber machine guns and two 37 mm cannons, along with up to 3,000 pounds (1,400 kg) of bombs. The A-39 was canceled before any prototypes were built.

== Specifications ==
Data from Johnson 2012

General characteristics

- Crew: one
- Length: 42 ft 9 in (13.03 m)
- Wingspan: 55 ft 9 in (16.99 m)
- Max takeoff weight: 20,500 lb (9,299 kg)
- Powerplant: 1 × Pratt & Whitney R-2800 radial engine, 2,100 hp (1,600 kW)

Armament

== See also ==
Aircraft of comparable role, configuration, and era

- Vultee A-35 Vengeance

Related lists

- List of attack aircraft
- List of military aircraft of the United States
