= Fleetwings BT-12 Sophomore =

1940s American military trainer aircraft

BT-12 Sophomore
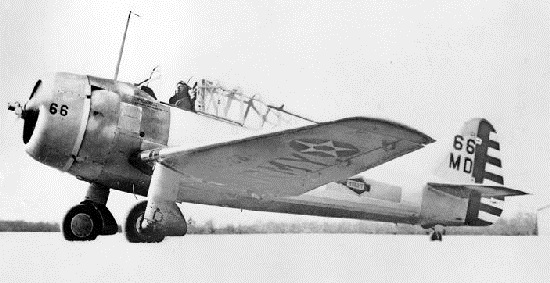
- The XBT-12

General information
- Type: Basic trainer
- National origin: United States
- Manufacturer: Fleetwings
- Primary user: United States Army Air Forces
- Number built: 25

History
- Manufactured: 1942-1943
- First flight: 1939

The Fleetwings BT-12 Sophomore, also known by the company designation Model 23, was a 1940s all-metal basic training monoplane built by Fleetwings for the United States Army Air Forces. Only 24 production examples of the type were built before the contract was cancelled.

== Design and development ==
With the outbreak of the Second World War, the United States Army Air Corps (later U.S. Army Air Forces) was ill-prepared for a major war. In an effort to obtain as many aircraft as possible the USAAF contracted Fleetwings, a specialist fabricator of sheet stainless steel, to produce a basic training monoplane. A prototype Model 23 was ordered as the XBT-12 during 1939.

The XBT-12 was an all-metal low-wing cantilever monoplane with a fixed tailwheel landing gear and powered by a Pratt & Whitney R-985 engine. The aircraft had two identical tandem cockpits for instructor and pupil covered by a continuous canopy. It was the first military aircraft to be constructed primarily from welded stainless steel.

== Operational history ==
After evaluation of the XBT-12 starting in late 1939, and delivery of the first aircraft to Wright Field in 1941, an order for 176 production aircraft, designated BT-12, was placed. Only 24 aircraft were delivered, one in 1942 and 23 in 1943, before the contract was cancelled, the Vultee BT-13 being preferred.

== Variants ==
XBT-12
Army designation for the prototype Model 23, one built.
BT-12
Army designation for the production Model 23, 24 built, 152 cancelled.

== Operators ==
United States
United States Army Air Forces

== Surviving aircraft ==
The sole surviving aircraft, XBT-12, 39-0719, was acquired by Walter Soplata and stored in his Newbury, Ohio backyard until September 2023, when it was sold. In August 2025, the aircraft was acquired from an owner in Tennessee by the Western Antique Aeroplane & Automobile Museum in Hood River, Oregon.

== Specifications (BT-12) ==
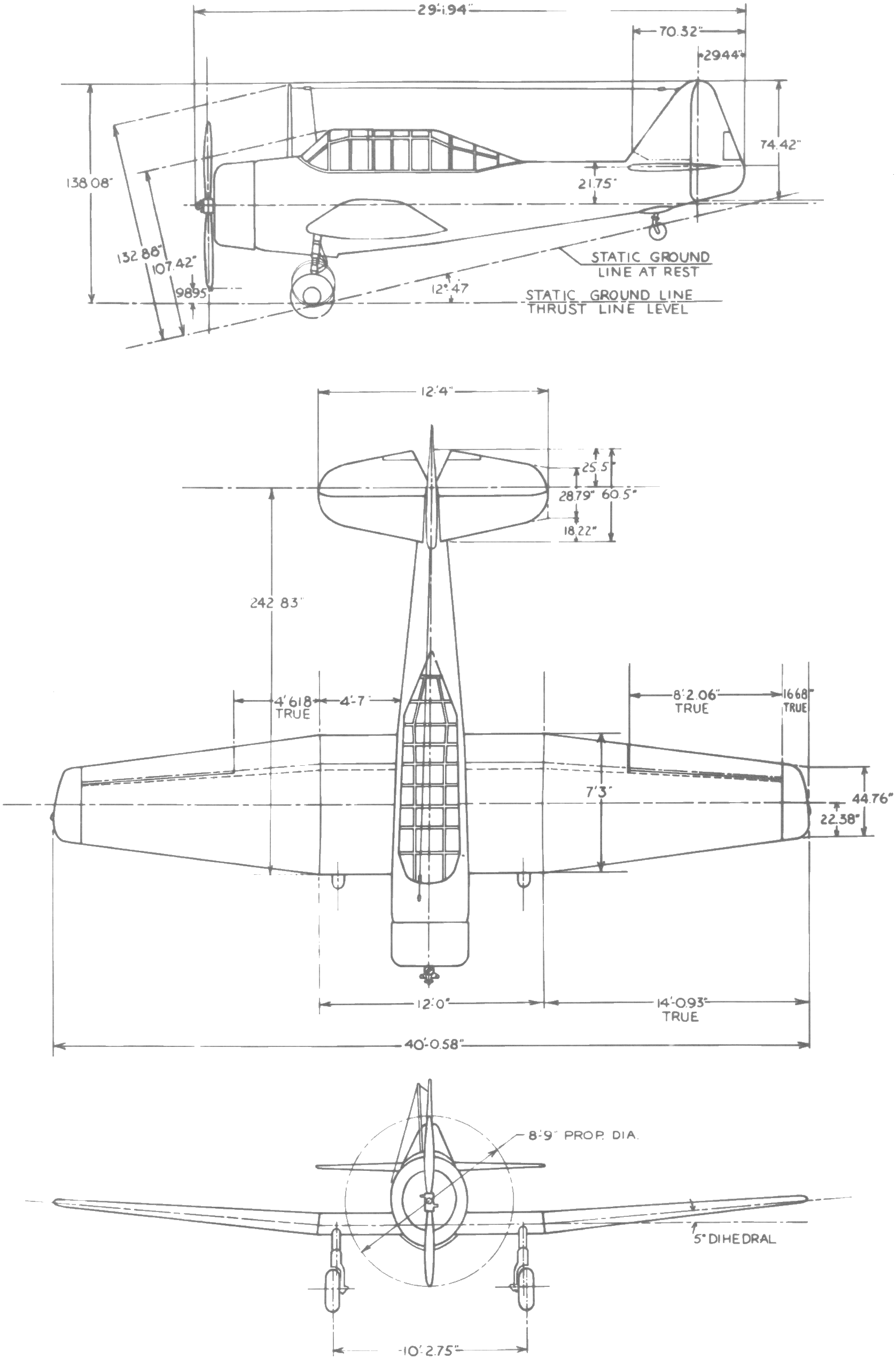
3-view line drawing of the Fleetwings BT-12 Sophomore

Data from The Illustrated Encyclopedia of Aircraft (Part Work 1982-1985), 1985, Orbis Publishing; also

General characteristics

- Crew: Two (pilot and instructor)
- Length: 29 ft 2 in (8.89 m)
- Wingspan: 40 ft (12 m)
- Height: 11 ft 4 in (3.45 m)
- Wing area: 240.4 sq ft (22.33 m^{2})
- Empty weight: 3,173 lb (1,439 kg)
- Gross weight: 4,497 lb (2,040 kg)
- Powerplant: 1 × Pratt & Whitney R-985-AN-1 Wasp Junior radial engine, 450 hp (340 kW)

Performance

- Maximum speed: 195 mph (314 km/h, 169 kn)
- Cruise speed: 150 mph (240 km/h, 130 kn)
- Range: 675 mi (1,086 km, 587 nmi)
- Service ceiling: 23,800 ft (7,300 m)
- Time to altitude: 10 minutes to 10,000 feet

== See also ==
Aircraft of comparable role, configuration, and era

- North American BT-9
- Vultee BT-13 Valiant

Related lists

- List of military aircraft of the United States
