= Curtiss XBTC =

1945 torpedo bomber aircraft prototype series by Curtiss

XBTC
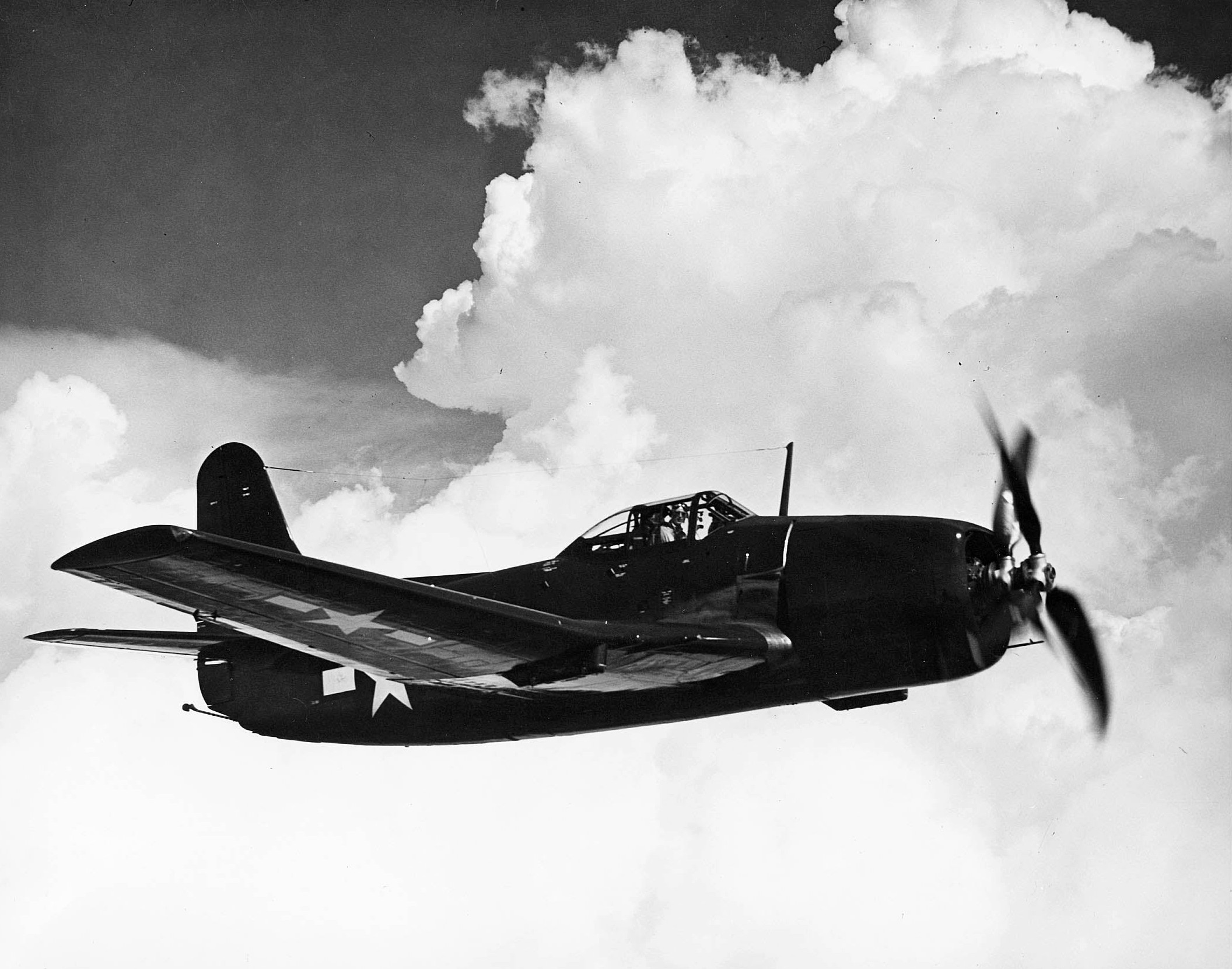
- A Curtiss XBTC-2 with the "Model B" wing in 1946

General information
- Type: Torpedo/dive bomber
- National origin: United States
- Manufacturer: Curtiss Aeroplane and Motor Company
- Number built: 2

History
- First flight: 20 January 1945

The Curtiss XBTC was a prototype single-seat, single-engined torpedo/dive bomber developed during World War II for the United States Navy. Four aircraft were ordered, powered by two different engines, but the two aircraft to be fitted with the Wright R-3350 radial engine were cancelled in late 1942, leaving only the pair using the Pratt & Whitney R-4360 radial. By this time, Curtiss Aircraft was overwhelmed with work and the Navy gave the XBTC-2 prototypes a low priority which delayed progress so the first flight did not take place until the beginning of 1945. One aircraft crashed in early 1947 and the other was disposed of later that year.

== Design and development ==
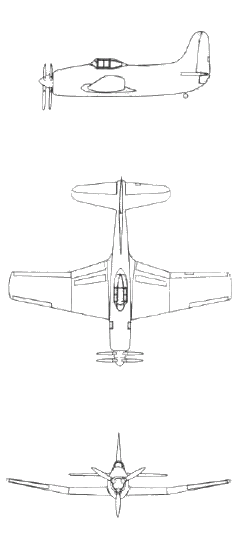
3-view drawing of the C-2 with the "Model B" wing

In the 1930s and early 1940s, the Navy divided carrier-borne bombers into two types: the torpedo bomber and the dive bomber, each with crews of two or three men. Wartime experience showed that pilots could aim bombs and torpedoes without assistance from other crewmembers as well as navigate with the aid of radio beacons and the development of more powerful engines meant that faster aircraft no longer needed a rear gunner for self-defense. Furthermore, the consolidation of the two types of bombers greatly increased the flexibility of a carrier's air group and allowed the number of fighters in an air group to be increased.

In January 1942 the Navy issued a specification to replace the prewar two-seat, carrier-capable VSB (Scout Bomber) aircraft with a single-seat aircraft that used the 2,200 hp (1,641 kW) Wright R-3350 radial engine. The aircraft was required to be armed with four 20-millimeter (0.8 in) autocannon and be capable of dive-bombing and torpedo attacks. It was to be provided with an internal bomb bay with space for two 1,000-or-1,600-pound (454 or 726 kg) bombs or a Mark 13 torpedo hung below the fuselage. The range requirement was for 1,000 nautical miles (1,852 km; 1,151 mi) with a 1,000-pound bomb or 1,500 nmi (2,778 km; 1,726 mi) with drop tanks. Curtiss responded with their Model 96 which was a low-wing monoplane with retractable conventional landing gear with the R-3350 and proposed an alternate powered by the heavier 3,000 hp (2,200 kW) Pratt & Whitney R-4360 radial that would use contra-rotating propellers to handle the extra horsepower. The Navy agreed to both and issued a letter of intent in late June for two aircraft equipped with the R-3350, the XBTC-1 (BT reflecting its new role), and another pair fitted with the R-4360, the XBTC-2. Due to development and production difficulties with the high-priority SB2C Helldiver dive bomber, along with the SO3C Seamew and SC Seahawk scout and observation floatplanes, the Navy only awarded a contract for the two XBTC-2 prototypes on 31 December and gave them a low priority.

Little documentation about the early development of the XBTC-2 has survived, but photographs of the mockup dated December are available. They show the larger engine installation of the XR-4360-8A and the contra-rotating propellers, but the mockup may have been reworked from the C-1 as it lacks the larger empennage that would be necessary to handle the more powerful engine. The prototypes had a fuel capacity of 540 US gallons (2,000 L; 450 imp gal) housed in two interconnected 90-US-gallon (340 L; 75 imp gal) fuselage tanks and a pair of interconnected 180-US-gallon (680 L; 150 imp gal) combination wing and fuselage tanks. The two wing hardpoints were plumbed to handle 100-or-150-US-gallon (380 or 570 L; 83 or 125 imp gal). An additional 300-US-gallon (1,100 L; 250 imp gal) fuel tank could be fitted in the bomb bay. All control surfaces were skinned with metal and the aircraft was fitted with a set of dive brakes on the upper and lower surfaces of the inner wing panel as well as slotted flaps along its trailing edge. The outer wing panels were equipped with leading-edge slats and had 10° dihedral.

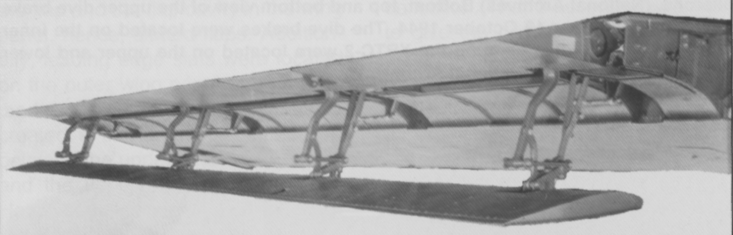
The "duplex" flaps of the XBTC-2 "Model B" wing

To improve landing performance the aircraft intended to be fitted with "duplex" (slotted) flaps, but wind-tunnel tests revealed problems with the flaps so two different outer wing panels were developed, both. The so-called "Model A" panel lacked the flaps and was lengthened by 2 ft (0.6 m). Its leading edge was perpendicular to the fuselage centerline and its trailing edge followed the taper of the inner wing panel. It was fitted with an aileron that started at the tip and extended inwards for about 3/4s of the panel's span; the remaining space was used by ordinary slotted flaps. It was also equipped with another pair of dive brakes. The "Model B" panel reversed the relationship of the leading and trailing edges. Its aileron occupied the entire trailing edge and the "duplex" flaps were positioned on the underside of the wing, just ahead of the aileron. In use, they were lowered to create space for air to reach the underside of the ailerons.

The armament of the XBTC-2s consisted of four 20 mm autocannon, each with 200 rounds. The bomb bay contained a single shackle that could handle ordnance up 1,600 pounds in weight. In a dive, the bomb was swung clear of the propeller on a H-shaped trapeze prior to release. A 2,000-pound (907 kg) torpedo (such as the Mark 13) could be mounted on the bomb bay doors, although nothing could be dropped from the bomb bay in that case. The wing hardpoints were stressed to carry weapons weighing up to 1,000 pounds.

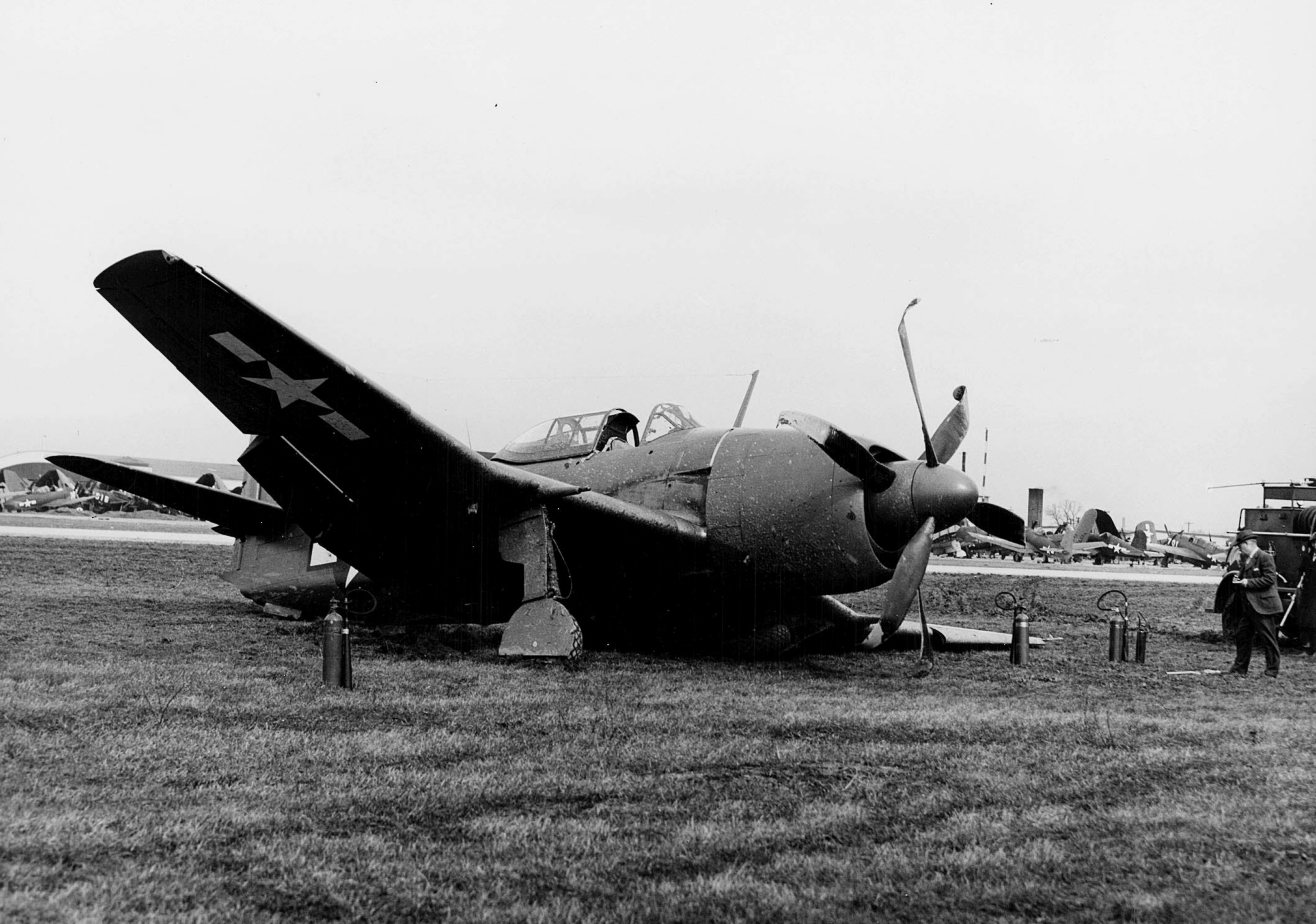
The first prototype XBTC-2 with a "Model A" wing after its landing accident, 3 March 1945

Development and construction of the two prototypes was delayed by the low priority given to the program by the Navy, so the aircraft did not make its first flight until 20 January 1945. It was fitted with a pre-production XR-4360-8A engine and the "Model A" wing. Although the second aircraft equipped with a production R-4360-14 engine and the "Model B" wing, both prototypes were initially fitted with 14-foot-2-inch (4.3 m) Curtiss Electric propellers, but they were replaced by 13.5-foot-6-inch (4.3 m) Aeroproducts AD7562 propellers sometime after a landing accident with the first prototype on 3 March. The aircraft was repaired and was later fitted with a "Model B" wing. They were delivered to the Naval Air Test Center at Naval Air Station Patuxent River, Maryland, on 30 July 1946. The second prototype crashed during stall testing when its engine failed on 17 March 1947. The surviving prototype was transferred to the Naval Air Material Unit in August for disposal.

The United States Army Air Forces assigned the designation A-40 to a proposed 'de-navalized' version of the XBTC; however, it later decided not to acquire any further single-engine attack aircraft and the project was cancelled.

== Variants ==
- XBTC-1: Wright R-3350 Duplex-Cyclone engine
- XBTC-2: Pratt & Whitney R-4360 Wasp Major engine
- A-40: Proposed version for U.S. Army Air Forces, none built.

== Operators ==
United States

- United States Navy

== Specifications (XBTC-2) ==
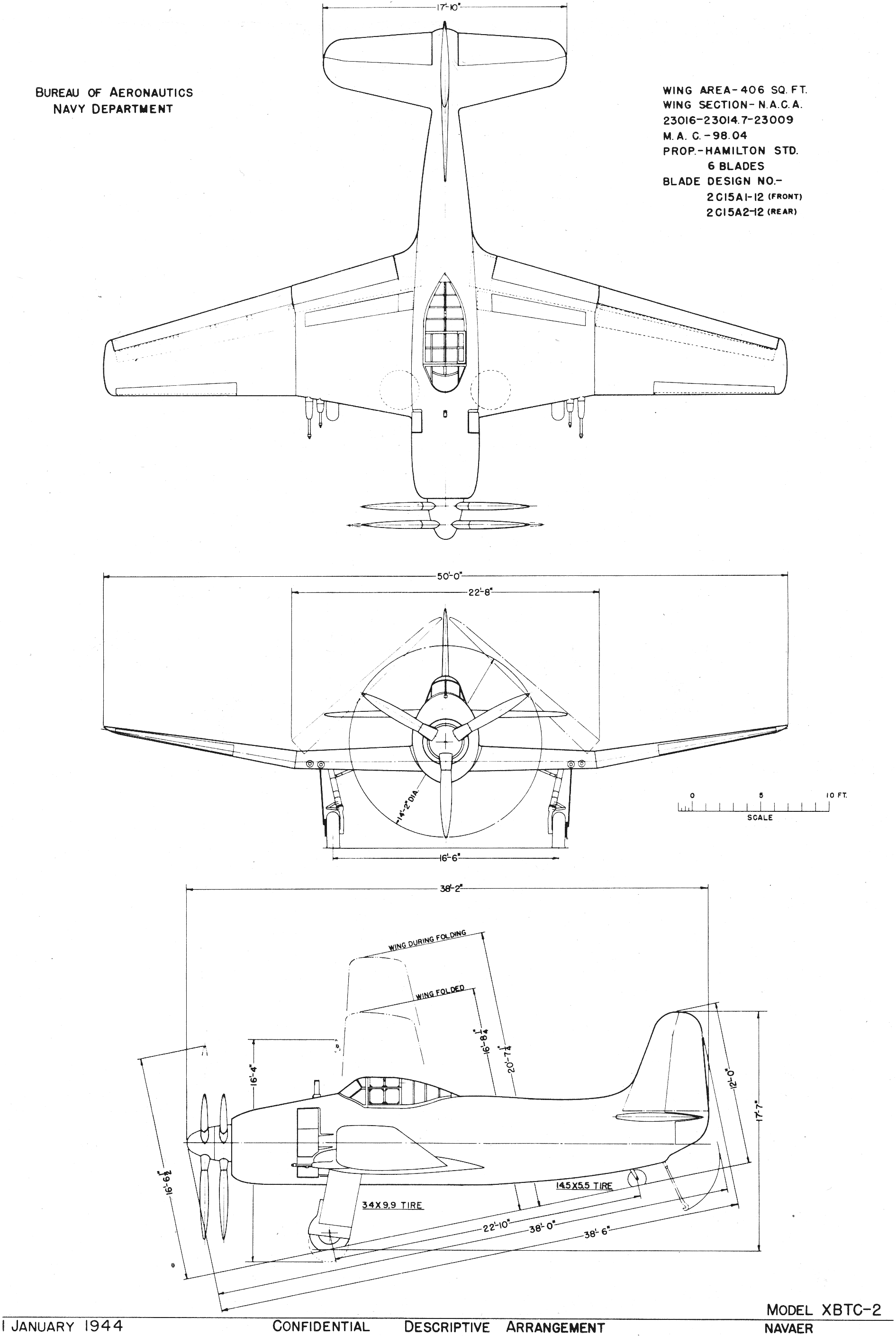
3-side view of the XBTC-2 with the "Model A" wing

Data from Curtiss Aircraft 1907–1947; Curtiss XBTC-2 "Eggbeater"

General characteristics

- Crew: one
- Length: 39 ft 0 in (11.89 m)
- Wingspan: 50 ft 0 in (15.24 m)
- Height: 12 ft 11 in (3.94 m)
- Wing area: 425 sq ft (39.5 m^{2})
- Empty weight: 13,410 lb (6,083 kg)
- Gross weight: 21,660 lb (9,825 kg) with one Mk 13 torpedo
- Fuel capacity: 540 US gallons (2,000 L; 450 imp gal), plus 2 × 150 US gal (570 L; 120 imp gal) drop tanks
- Powerplant: 1 × Pratt & Whitney R-4360 Wasp Major radial engine, 3,000 hp (2,200 kW)
- Propellers: 6-bladed contra-rotating propeller

Performance

- Maximum speed: 374 mph (602 km/h, 325 kn) at 16,000 ft (4,900 m)
- Cruise speed: 188 mph (303 km/h, 163 kn)
- Range: 1,835 mi (2,953 km, 1,595 nmi) at 188 mph (303 km/h)
- Service ceiling: 26,200 ft (8,000 m)
- Rate of climb: 2,250 ft/min (11.4 m/s)

Armament

- Guns: 4 × 20 mm cannon
- Missiles: One torpedo
- Bombs: Up to 2,000 pounds (910 kg)

== See also ==
Aircraft of comparable role, configuration, and era

- Douglas AD Skyraider
- Kaiser-Fleetwings XBTK
- Martin AM Mauler

Related lists

- List of attack aircraft
- List of United States Navy aircraft designations (pre-1962)
