= Fleetwings PQ-12 =

1940s American target drone

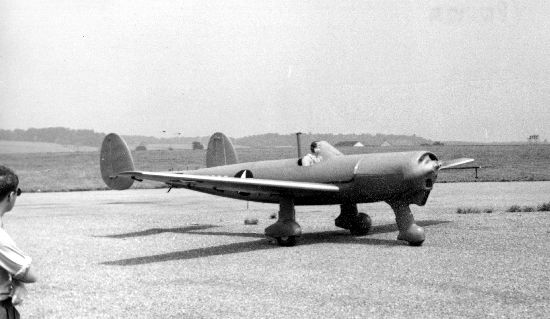
- A YPQ-12A

General information
- Type: Manned aerial-target
- National origin: United States
- Manufacturer: Fleetwings
- Primary user: United States Army Air Corps
- Number built: 9

The Fleetwings PQ-12 , company designation Fleetwings Model 36, was a 1940s American manned aerial-target designed and built by Fleetwings for the United States Army Air Corps.

== Design and development ==
The PQ-12 was a single-engined monoplane with a 225 hp (168 kW) Lycoming O-435 piston engine. It had a fixed nose-wheel landing gear, twin vertical tails and an open-cockpit was provided for manned flight. Instead of the optional pilot a 500 lb (225 kg) bomb could be carried in the cockpit. The original prototype was cancelled but a modified variant was built followed by eight test aircraft, although an order for 40 production aircraft was placed it was subsequently cancelled.

== Variants ==
XPQ-12
Prototype, not built.
XPQ-12A
Modified prototype, one-built.
YPQ-12A
Test and evaluation aircraft, eight-built.
PQ-12A
Production variant, 40 ordered but none were built.

== Specifications (YPQ-12A) ==
Data from Jane's all the World's Aircraft 1947

General characteristics

- Crew: 0 / 1
- Length: 20 ft 0 in (6.1 m)
- Wingspan: 30 ft 2 in (9.2 m)
- Height: 7 ft 0 in (2.13 m)
- Gross weight: 2,196 lb (996 kg) with pilot; 2,688 lb (1,219 kg) pilotless with 500 lb (230 kg) bomb
- Powerplant: 1 × Lycoming O-435-5 6-cyl. air-cooled horizontally-opposed piston engine, 225 hp (168 kW)
- Propellers: 2-bladed fixed pitch wooden propeller

Performance

- Maximum speed: 185 mph (298 km/h, 161 kn) as pilotless target
