= VA-174 (U.S. Navy) =

Attack Squadron 174
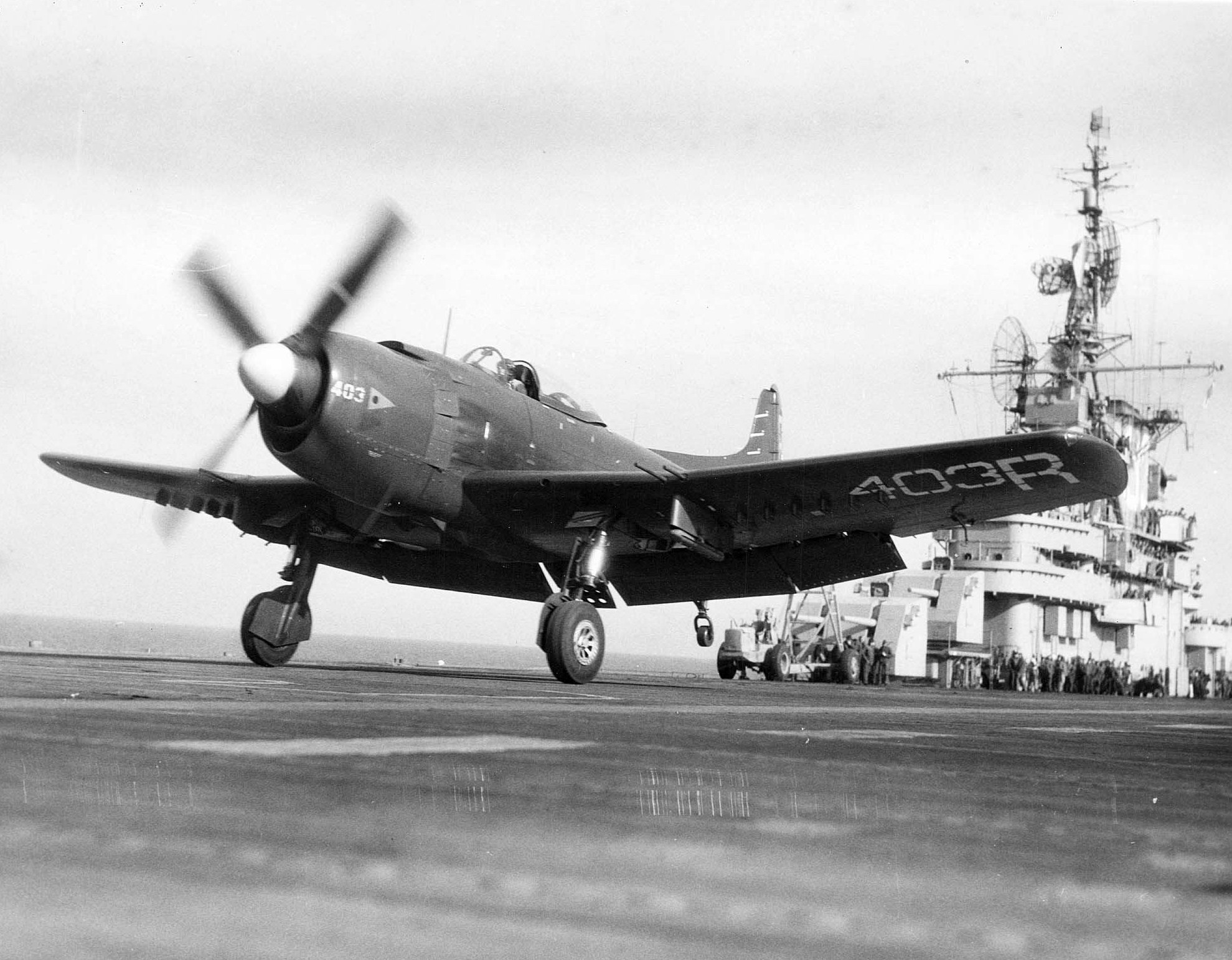
- Martin AM-1 Mauler of VA-174 launching from USS Kearsarge in 1949
- Active: 1 April 1944 - 25 January 1950
- Country: United States
- Branch: United States Navy
- Type: Attack
- Nickname: Battering Rams
- Engagements: World War II

Aircraft flown
- Attack: Curtiss SB2 Helldiver; Martin AM-1 Mauler; Douglas AD-3 Skyraider

VA-174 was an Attack Squadron of the U.S. Navy. It was established as Bomber Squadron VB-82 on 1 April 1944, redesignated as VA-17A on 15 November 1946, and finally as VA-174 on 11 August 1948. The squadron was disestablished on 25 January 1950. Its nickname throughout its life was the "Battering Rams".

A second squadron was assigned the VA-174 designation in 1966.

== Operational history ==
VB-82 embarked on USS Bennington, along with other units of Carrier Air Group 82 (CVG-8200, on 15 December 1944 and departed for Pearl Harbor, arriving there on 7 January 1945, following a stopover at NAS San Diego.

On 16 February 1945, VB-82 participated in the first carrier-based air strikes on Tokyo, flying sorties against installations at Mitsune and Mikatagahara Airfields on the island of Hachijō-jima, Nanpo Shoto. From 20–22 February 1945 squadron aircraft provided air support for the invasion of Iwo Jima. On 19 March 1945 Japanese naval vessels in the Inland Sea were attacked by VB-82 aircraft and other aircraft assigned to Task Group 58.1.

From March to May 1945 the squadron participated in pre-invasion strikes on Okinawa and provided air support during the invasion of the island. During this, on 7 April 1945 squadron aircraft participated in Task Force 58’s attacks on the Japanese battleship Yamato and her escorts in the East China Sea as they made an attempt to intercede in the battle of Okinawa. The attacks resulted in the sinking of the Yamato, one cruiser and four destroyers.

On 17 June the squadron was embarked on USS White Plains for transit back to the US, arriving –9 July 1945.

== Home port assignments ==
The squadron was assigned to these home ports, effective on the dates shown:

- NAS Wildwood – 1 April 1944*
- NAAS Oceana – 15 June 1944*
- NAS Norfolk, East Field – 17 September 1944*
- NAS Quonset Point – 13 November 1944*
- NAS Kahului – 8 January 1945*
- NAS Alameda – 9 July 1945
- NAS Quonset Point – 1 February 1946
- NAAS Cecil Field – 1 February 1949

* Temporary shore assignment while the squadron conducted training in preparation for combat deployment.

== Aircraft assignment ==
The squadron first received the following aircraft on the dates shown:

- SB2C-1C Helldiver – 01 Apr 1944
- SB2C-3 Helldiver – 22 May 1944
- SB2C-4E Helldiver – 17 Nov 1944
- SBW-4E Helldiver – Feb 1946
- SB2C-5 Helldiver – 01 Jul 1946
- SBW-5 Helldiver – Jul 1946
- Martin AM-1 Mauler – 01 Mar 1948
- AD-3 Skyraider – Apr 1949

== See also ==
- List of squadrons in the Dictionary of American Naval Aviation Squadrons
- List of inactive United States Navy aircraft squadrons
- History of the United States Navy
