= VA-85 (U.S. Navy) =

Attack Squadron 85
- Active: 15 September 1948 – 29 November 1949
- Country: United States
- Branch: United States Navy
- Type: Attack

Aircraft flown
- Attack: TBM Avenger; AM-1 Mauler

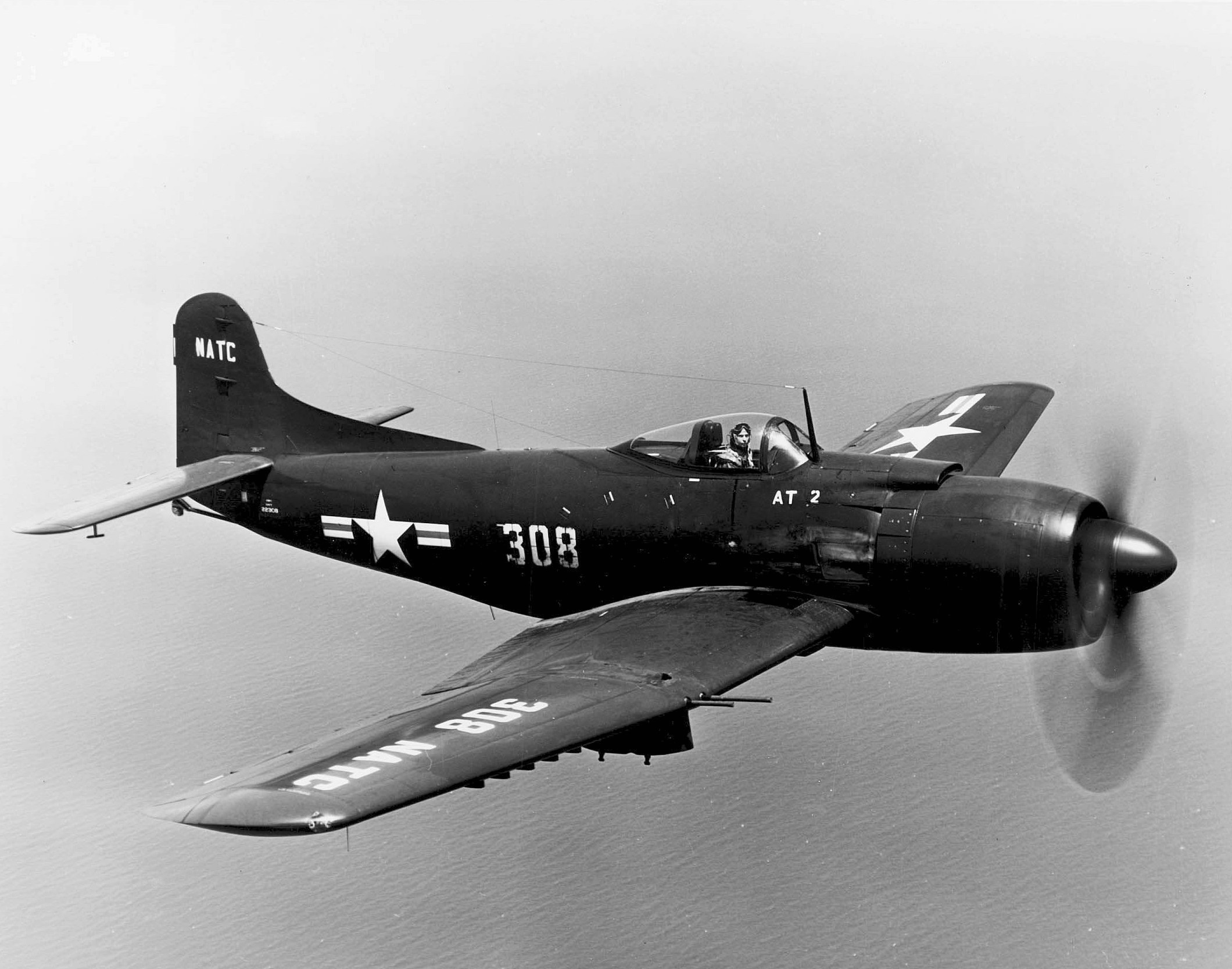
An AM-1 Mauler similar to those of VA-85

VA-85 was a short-lived Attack Squadron of the United States Navy. It was established on 15 September 1948 and disestablished on 29 November 1949. The squadron's nickname is unknown. It was the first squadron to be designated VA-85, a second VA-85 was established as VA-859 on 1 February 1951, redesignated VA-85 on 4 February 1953 and disestablished on 30 September 1994.

== Home port assignments ==
The squadron was assigned to these home ports, effective on the dates shown:

- NAS Oceana – 15 Sep 1948
- NAS Jacksonville – 5 November 1948

== Aircraft assignment ==
The squadron first received the following aircraft on the dates shown:

- TBM-3E Avenger – Nov 1948
- AM-1 Mauler – 20 Nov 1948

== See also ==
- Attack aircraft
- List of inactive United States Navy aircraft squadrons
- History of the United States Navy
