= VA-174 (U.S. Navy, 1966-1988) =

Attack Squadron 174
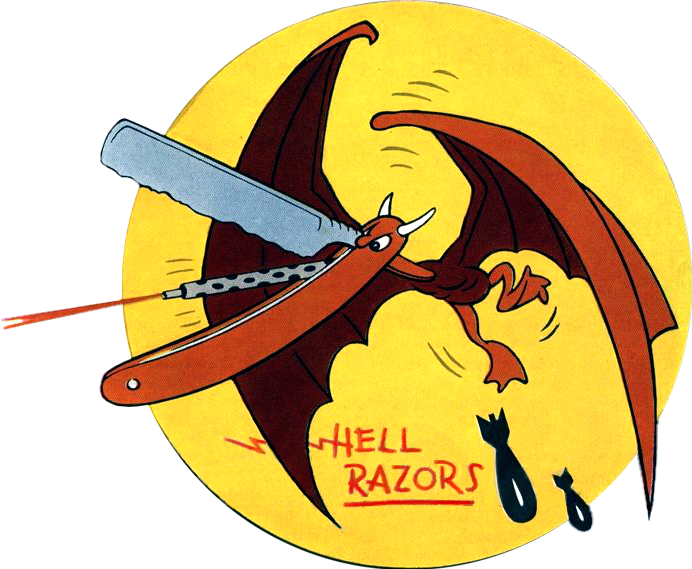
- VA-174 Insignia
- Active: 1 March 1944 – 30 June 1988
- Country: United States of America
- Branch: United States Navy
- Type: Attack Squadron
- Part of: Light Attack Wing One
- Garrison/HQ: NAS Cecil Field
- Nickname: "Hellrazors"
- Equipment: A-7 Corsair II
- Decorations: Navy Unit Commendation; Navy Meritorious Unit Commendation; Asiatic–Pacific Campaign Medal

Commanders
- Notable commanders: Commander John S. McCain III; 1 July 1976 – 28 July 1977

Attack Squadron 174 (VA-174) also known as the "Hellrazors" was a United States Navy attack squadron based at Naval Air Station Cecil Field, Florida, and were attached to Light Attack Wing One. It was commissioned from 1944 to 1988.

== History ==
The unit has evolved several times throughout its history that dates back to 1944. When it was established in March 1944 the unit was designated VB-81 flying the SB2C Helldiver. It was redesignated VA-13A on 15 November 1946. The unit was redesignated VA-134 on 2 August 1948 flying F-4U Corsairs, and redesignated VF-174 on 15 February 1950. The Hellrazors received their final designation VA-174 on 1 July 1966 after becoming the first US Navy squadron to receive the A-7A Corsair II. It was the second squadron to bear the VA-174 designation, the first VA-174 was disestablished on 25 January 1950. The squadron was disestablished on 30 June 1988.

The nickname "Hell Razors" was conceived by Walt Disney Studios, which also created the squadron's insignia, a caricature of an imaginary bat-like, razor-beaked creature from Hell, embodying the qualities of ferocity, determination, and a razor sharp skill in the use of aircraft and airborne weapons.

=== World War II ===
VB-81 was established on 1 March 1944 and was deployed to the Pacific War aboard the aircraft carrier USS Wasp (CV-18) from November 1944 to February 1945.

=== Cold War (1946-1958) ===
VB-81 was redesignated VA-13A in November 1946 while the squadron was embarked on USS Princeton (CV-37). In 1949 the squadron transferred to the East Coast. Arriving in Naval Air Station Jacksonville the squadron was redesignated to VA-134 and later VF-174. Operating aboard the USS Coral Sea (CVA-43) with Carrier Air Group Seventeen, VF-174 participated in operations "Protex" and "Caribox" from September 1950 to January 1951. It returned to Jacksonville to transition to the F9F-6 Cougar and then made a short cruise to Guantanamo Bay in May and June 1951 aboard the USS Midway (CVA-41). The Hellrazors were selected as the best fighter squadron in the Atlantic Fleet shortly before they embarked for a six-month Mediterranean Sea cruise in September 1951 aboard the USS Franklin D. Roosevelt (CVA-42).

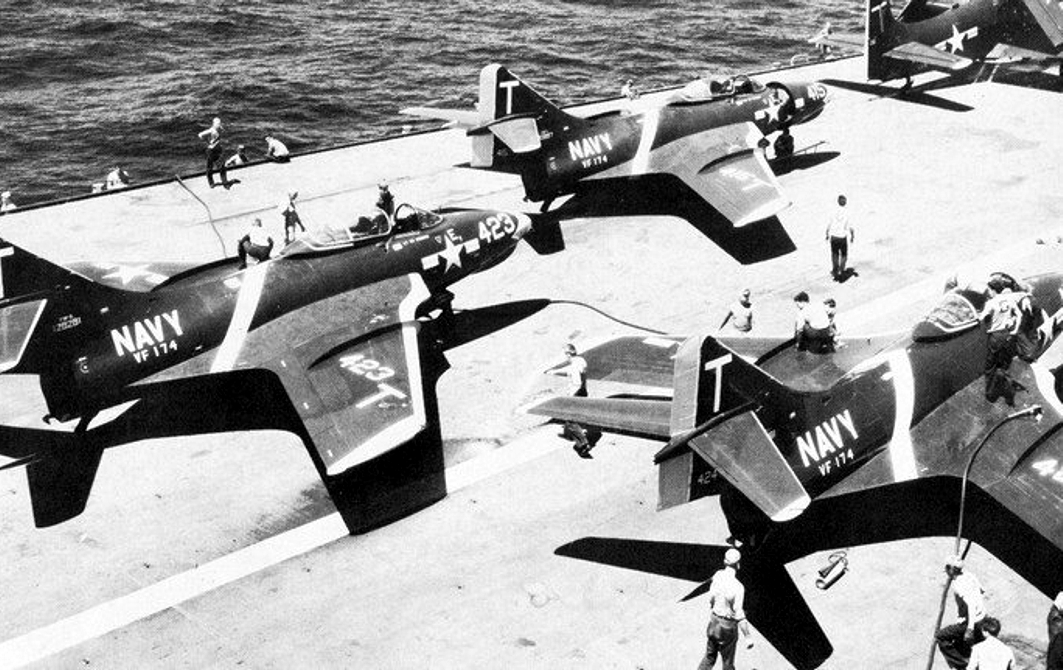
F9F-6 Cougars of VF-174 on USS Midway, in 1955.

The squadron returned from the Mediterranean in February 1952 and participated in operations "Mainbase" and "Long Step" in July 1952. In preparation for a globe-circling cruise, VF-174 deployed twice to Guantanamo Bay, Cuba for intensive gunnery training. Both time the squadron was cited for "Outstanding Performance". After returning from their second "Gitmo" trip in early 1954, the squadron moved to its present home at Naval Air Station Cecil Field and joined Carrier Air Group One. In late 1954 the USS Midway (CVA-41) became the first American carrier to visit the British port of Cape Town, South Africa. While in the Pacific the carrier operated with the Seventh Fleet near Formosa and VF-174 participated in the evacuation of the Tachen Island in December 1954.

Immediately after their return to Cecil Field in August 1955, VF-174 transitioned to the FJ-3 Fury. The squadron operated with the new Furies for only a few months and then transitioned to the F9F-8 Cougar in early 1956. With the new "Cougars" an attack syllabus was added to the normal fighter operations. Acting as both and attack and fighter squadron, the Hellrazors deployed to the Far East in October 1956 aboard the USS Bennington (CVA-20) as a special weapons squadron with Air Task Group One Eighty One. The squadron returned to Cecil Field in May 1957. In January 1958, VF-174 transitioned to the F8U-1 Crusader and in March 1958 began training pilots in F8U's for Atlantic Fleet squadrons.

=== Fleet Replacement Squadron (1958-1988) ===
On 1 May 1958 the squadron relinquished its seagoing role and was officially designated the Atlantic Fleet F8U replacement pilot training squadron. During the next eight years until 1 July 1966, VF-174 excelled in all areas. The squadron evaluated the Mark IV Full Pressure Suit, the Delmar Missile and Gunnery Target System, and the two-seater TF-8A Crusader. The squadron assumed an all weather fighter capability with the arrival of the F8U-2N in November 1960, and later trained French Navy Pilots in the plane. The squadron received the Aviation Safety Award in 1960 and again in 1962, and the Delmar Target System Award for top efficiency in gunnery exercises in 1963. VF-174 continued in this role until 1 July 1966, when the squadron was redesignated Attack Squadron One Seven Four in preparation for its assignment to conduct the Fleet Introduction Program for the Navy's newest light attack replacement pilots.

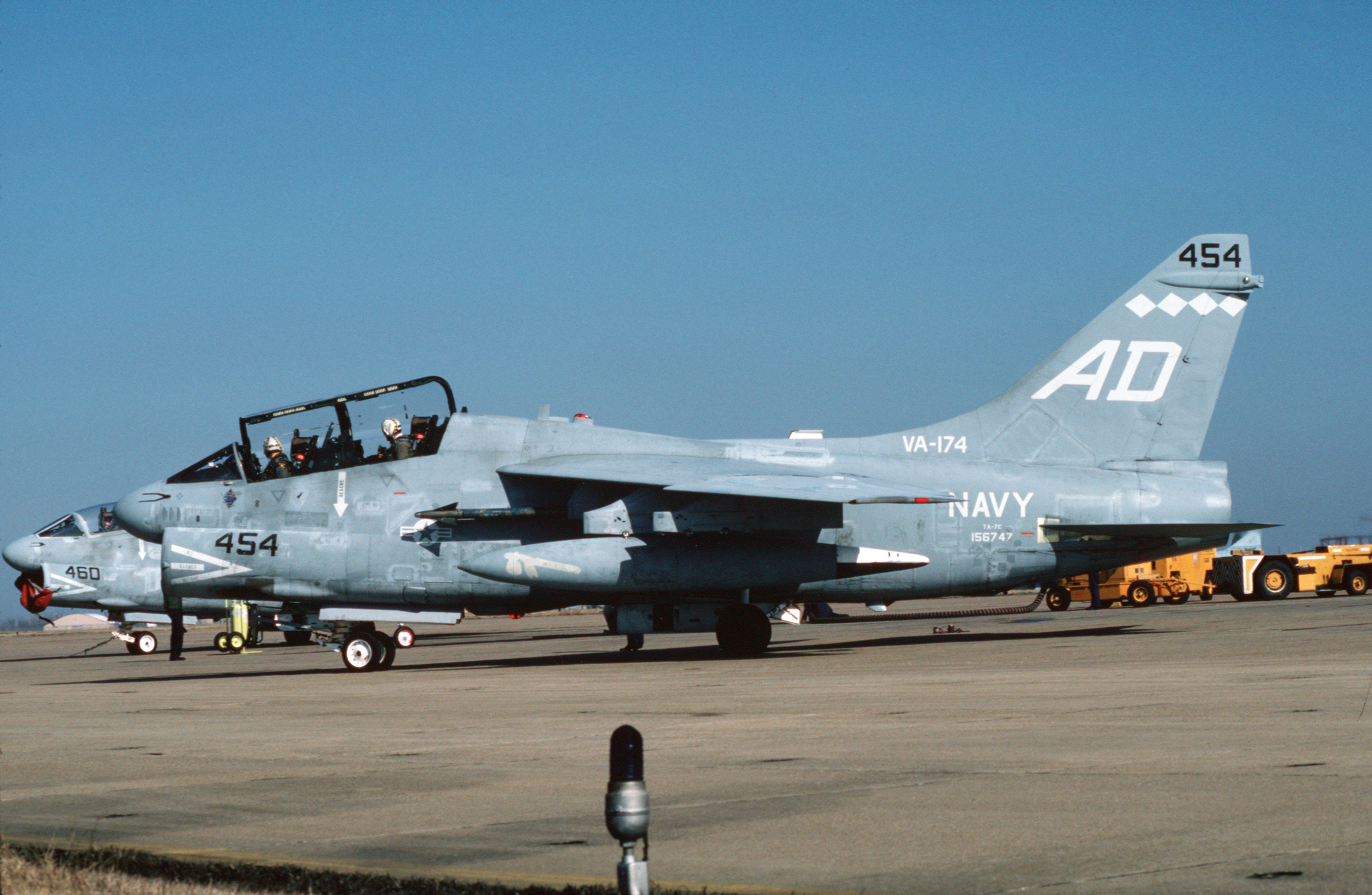
An VA-174 TA-7C at NAS Dallas in 1988.

The squadron's first A-7 Corsair II arrived on 13 October 1966, flown by Cdr. D.S. Ross, the squadrons Commanding Officer. Vice Admiral C.T. Booth, Commander Naval Air Force, U.S. Atlantic Fleet, received the aircraft from Mr. W. Paul Thayer, president of Ling-Temco-Vought Aerospace, Inc. In January 1967, the squadron assumed its new role of training light attack replacement pilots and completed training of the first Atlantic Fleet A-7A squadron VA-86 on 1 June 1967. In September 1967, VA-83 completed training and by 1 December 1967, a third squadron, VA-37, completed its transitioning.

The squadron received its first A-7E in December 1969, and transitioned the Atlantic Fleet's first squadron VA-81 on 1 June 1970. In addition to conducting squadron transition training, VA-174 continued to train all the replacement pilots and enlisted maintenance personnel who served in the Atlantic Fleet Light Attack Squadrons. As of 1 August 1971, VA-174 had trained 535 pilots, 48 maintenance officers and 4815 enlisted maintenance personnel. VA-174 was the largest aviation squadron in the U.S. Navy. Commander John McCain was the Executive Officer and Commanding Officer of VA-174 in the mid-1970s.

The squadron also had a permanent West Coast detachment(VA-174Det)which had their own squadron patch. First located at MCAS Yuma and later relocated to NAF El Centro. They would provide live fire training for the student pilots at the local bomb ranges. First with Mk 76 and later Mk 82 and Mk 84 bombs. This detachment was called the Desert Rats and consisted of about 100 maintenance personnel. The West Coast detachment of aircraft would last for about two weeks. When the squadron was decommissioned many of the El Centro personnel were sent to man a new A-6 detachment that was sent to El Centro.

The squadron was disestablished on 30 June 1988.

There is currently a static display A-7A at NAF El Centro that bears the squadrons markings.

== See also ==
- History of the United States Navy
- List of inactive United States Navy aircraft squadrons
- List of United States Navy aircraft squadrons
