= Virginia State Route 85 =

The following highways in Virginia have been known as State Route 85:

- State Route 85 (Virginia 1933-1958), now State Route 102
- Interstate 85 in Virginia, 1957–present
