= Fleetwings 33 =

1940s American trainer aircraft prototype

Model 33
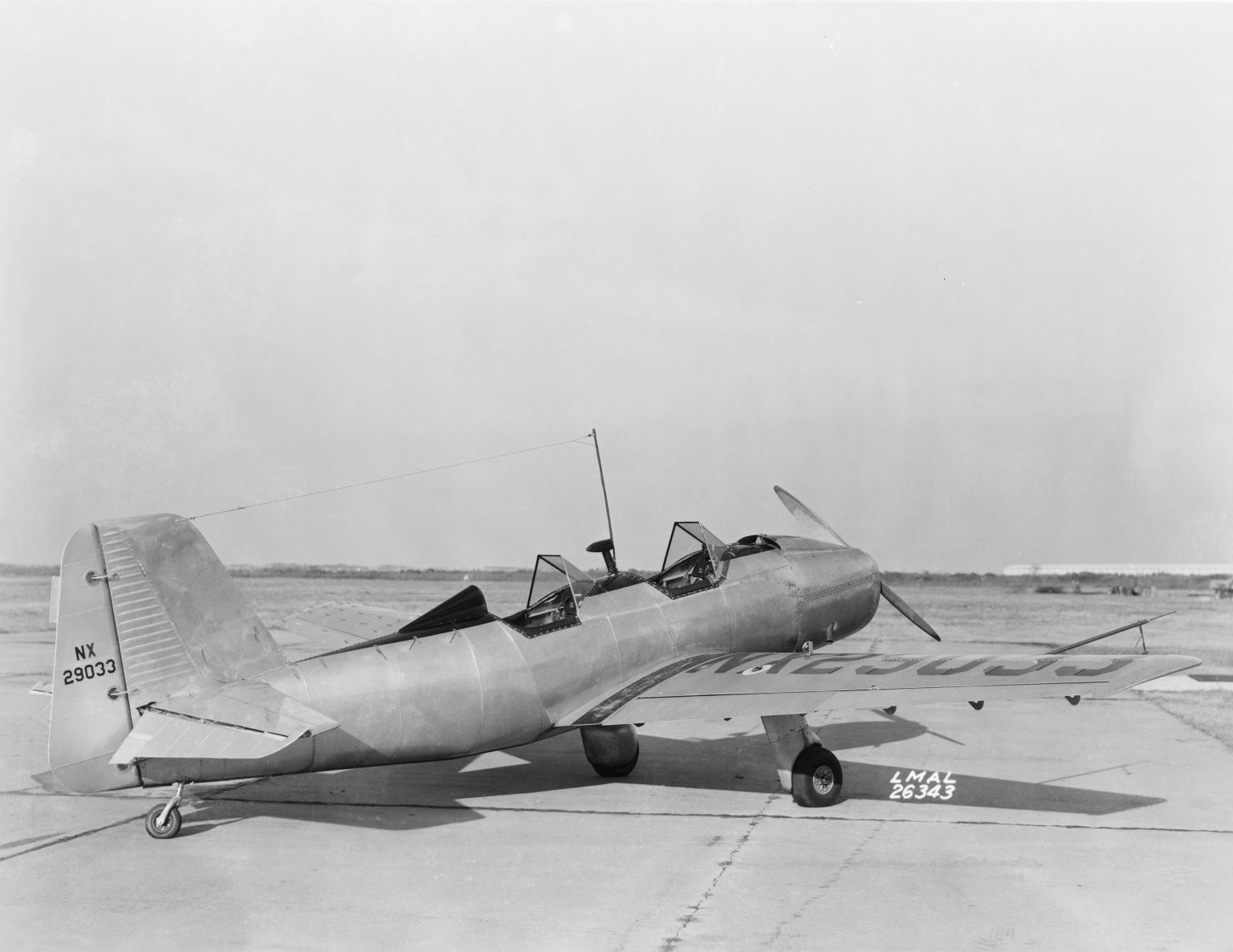
- Fleetwings 33 at Langley

General information
- Type: Primary trainer
- Manufacturer: Fleetwings
- Number built: 1

History
- First flight: 1940

The Fleetwings Model 33 was a 1940s American primary trainer prototype airplane built by Fleetwings.

== Development ==
During 1940, the Fleetwings company designed and built a two-seat primary trainer, the Model 33. Although the company were experts with stainless-steel construction the aircraft was built from light-alloy. It was a cantilever low-wing monoplane with a conventional tail unit and fixed tailwheel landing gear, powered by Franklin 6AC piston engine. The instructor and pupil were accommodated in two tandem open cockpits. Only the prototype was built.

== Specifications (Model 33) ==
Data from The Illustrated Encyclopedia of Aircraft (Part Work 1982-1985), 1985, Orbis Publishing

General characteristics

- Crew: Two
- Length: 22 ft 2.5 in (6.77 m)
- Wingspan: 28 ft 6 in (8.69 m)
- Height: 6 ft 0 in (1.83 m)
- Wing area: 121.5 sq ft (11.29 m^{2})
- Empty weight: 1,082 lb (491 kg)
- Gross weight: 1,650 lb (748 kg)
- Powerplant: 1 × Franklin 6AC-298 flat-six piston engine , 130 hp (97 kW)

Performance

- Maximum speed: 150 mph (241 km/h, 130 kn)
- Range: 520 mi (837 km, 450 nmi)
- Service ceiling: 22,600 ft (6,890 m)
