= Martin AM Mauler =

1944 attack aircraft family by the Glenn L. Martin Company

AM Mauler
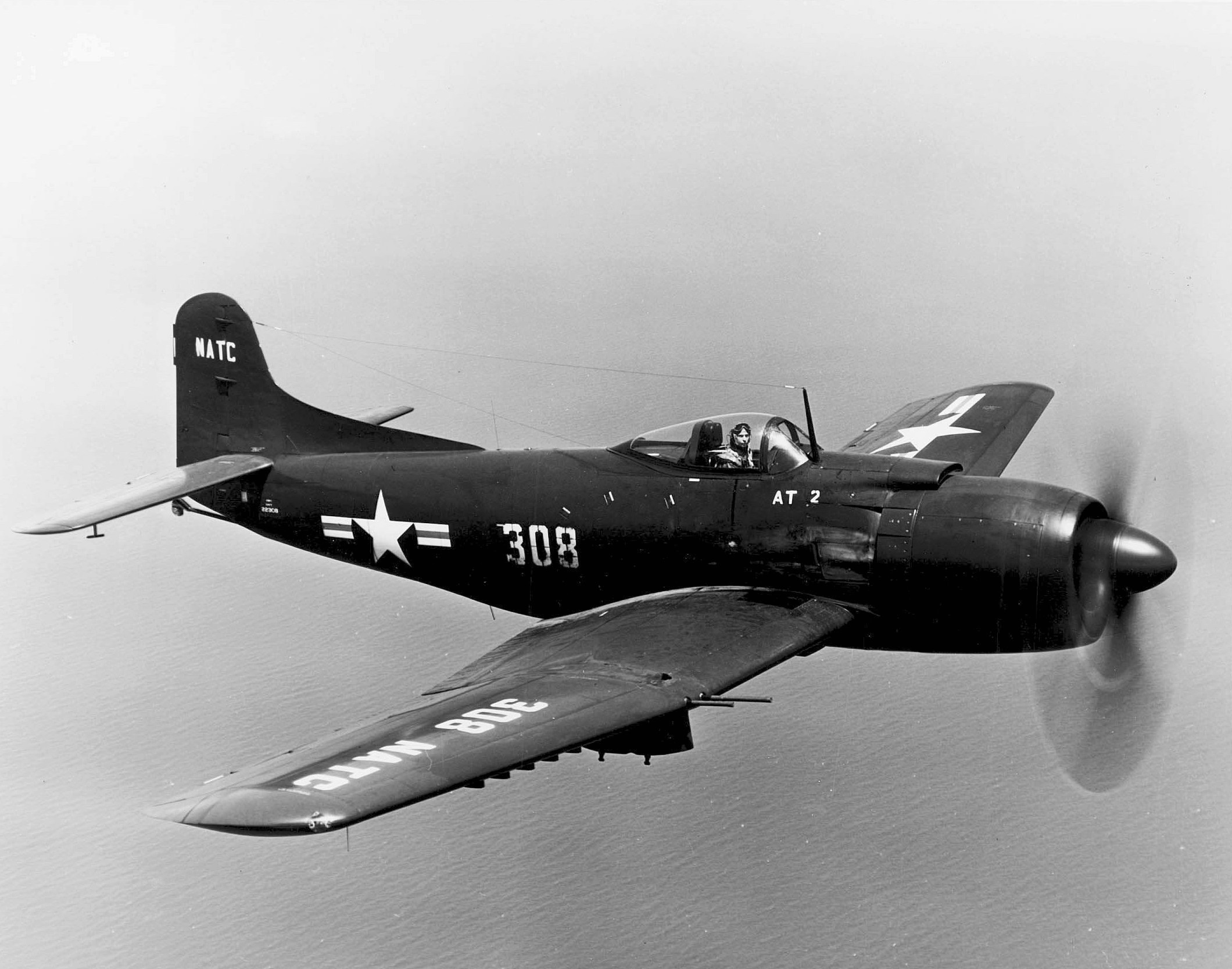
- An AM-1 of the U.S. Naval Test Center

General information
- Type: Attack aircraft
- National origin: United States
- Manufacturer: Glenn L. Martin Company
- Primary user: United States Navy
- Number built: 151

History
- Introduction date: March 1948
- First flight: 26 August 1944
- Retired: 1953

The Martin AM Mauler (originally XBTM) is a single-seat carrier-based attack aircraft built for the United States Navy. Designed during World War II, the Mauler encountered development delays and did not enter service until 1948 in small numbers. The aircraft proved troublesome and remained in frontline service only until 1950, when the Navy switched to the smaller and simpler Douglas AD Skyraider. Maulers remained in reserve squadrons until 1953. A few were built as AM-1Q electronic-warfare aircraft with an additional crewman in the fuselage.

== Design and development ==
In the 1930s and early 1940s, the Navy divided carrier-borne bombers into two types: the torpedo bomber and the dive bomber, each with crews of two or three men. Wartime experience showed that pilots could aim bombs and torpedoes without assistance from other crewmembers as well as navigate with the aid of radio beacons, and the development of more powerful engines meant that faster aircraft no longer needed a rear gunner for self-defense. Furthermore, the consolidation of the two types of bombers greatly increased the flexibility of a carrier's air group and allowed the number of fighters in an air group to be increased.

In 1943, the US Navy invited proposals for a new multi-purpose bomber and selected four designs in September: the Curtiss XBTC, Douglas XBT2D Skyraider, Kaiser-Fleetwings BTK and the Martin XBTM. Martin was tasked to provide a backup to the Curtiss design which had been selected as a replacement to the Curtiss SB2C Helldiver. Due to the US Navy's concern that the Curtiss design was overly complex and that the company's record was particularly poor during the Helldiver's development, Martin was instructed to create an "unexperimental" design that would be a reliable platform for the Pratt & Whitney R-4360 Wasp Major radial engine that powered both aircraft. Two prototypes were ordered from Martin on 31 May 1944 with the internal designation of Model 210.

The XBTM-1 was a low-wing, all-metal monoplane with folding wings to allow more compact storage in carrier hangar decks, and conventional landing gear. Its fuselage was an oval-shaped stressed-skin semi-monocoque with the single-seat cockpit and its teardrop-shaped canopy positioned just aft of the air-cooled engine. Just behind the cockpit was a 150-US-gallon (570 L; 120 imp gal) fuel tank. The large wing consisted of a two-spar center section with hydraulically folded three-spar outer panels. A large dive brake was positioned on the trailing edge of the wing. When closed it could be lowered for use as a landing flap or it could be split into alternating upper and lower sections, with intermeshing "fingers" for use in its intended role. It was very effective in this role, mainly due to its great surface area, but this was at the cost of the width of the ailerons, which significantly reduced their efficiency. A pair of 180-US-gallon (680 L; 150 imp gal) fuel tanks were positioned in the roots of the center section. All fuel tanks were self sealing and the pilot and oil cooler were protected by 297 pounds (135 kg) of armor.

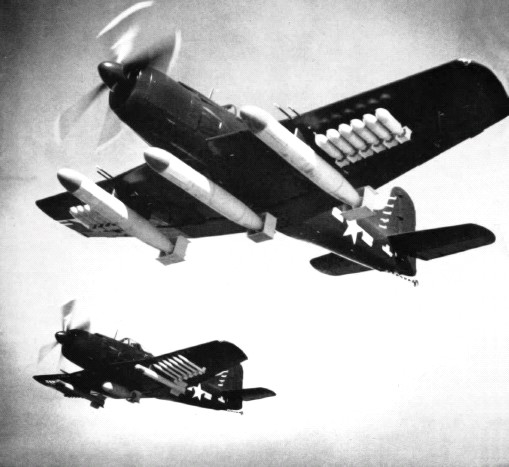
Two AM-1s during armament tests 30 March 1949; the aircraft closest to the camera is the one that set the unofficial payload record and is today preserved in the National Naval Aviation Museum

The fixed armament of four 20 mm (0.79 in) T-31 autocannon was fitted in the center section, adjacent to the outer wing panels with 200 rounds per gun. A centerline hardpoint and a pair of outer hardpoints were installed on the center section and rated to take bombs, fuel tanks or torpedoes up to 2,300 pounds (1,043 kg) in weight. The outer hardpoints could also carry an AN/APS-4 search radar in a pod. A dozen hardpoints could be installed on the outer wing panels to carry 250-pound (113 kg) bombs or 5-inch (127 mm) High Velocity Aircraft Rockets. In service, the Mauler earned the nickname "Able Mabel" because its AM designation and the fact that in the phonetic alphabet of the era the letter A was pronounced as "Able", the name Mabel being a rhyme and representing the M, and perhaps of its remarkable load-carrying ability, once lifting 10,648 pounds (4,830 kg) of ordnance (three 2,200-pound (998 kg) torpedoes, a dozen 250-pound bombs plus its 20 mm guns and their ammunition) on 30 March 1949, perhaps the heaviest load ever carried by a single-engine, piston-powered aircraft.

The first XBTM-1 made its maiden flight on 26 August 1944 and began flight testing after it reached the Naval Air Test Center on 11 December. The Navy ordered 750 more aircraft on 15 January 1945, although this was reduced to 99 aircraft after the surrender of Japan in August. The second prototype made its first flight on 20 May. Initial flight tests conducted with the first two prototypes revealed significant problems with the engine, its cowling, the vertical stabilizer and rudder. In response, the cowling was lengthened 6 inches (152 mm) and the engine mount was canted two degrees to the right to offset the engine's tremendous torque. The length of the carburetor airscoop was extended and the propeller spinner, rudder, and the vertical stabilizer were redesigned. In April 1946 the aircraft designation was changed to AM-1 when the Navy replaced its Bomber-Torpedo classification with Attack, well before the redesign was completed in early 1947.

First deliveries began in March 1947 and a flight test program began that month that lasted three years before the major deficiencies identified were fully corrected. Carrier landing trials revealed a structural weakness of the rear fuselage when one aircraft was broken in half during a heavy landing. Severe vibrations in the tail upon engaging the arresting wire were cured by adding a roller bearing to the tailhook to counter the sideways forces placed on the tailhook. Other necessary changes were the addition of spoiler ailerons and an elevator control boost to improve the aircraft's poor controllability at low speeds. In addition, the cockpit layout was unsatisfactory and had to be redesigned. The NATC finally deemed the Mauler acceptable for carrier landings in August 1948 even though aircraft had been issued to one squadron earlier in the year and a new batch of 50 aircraft had been ordered in May. Despite all the modifications to the aircraft over its short life, it remained a maintenance nightmare, especially the leaky hydraulic systems.

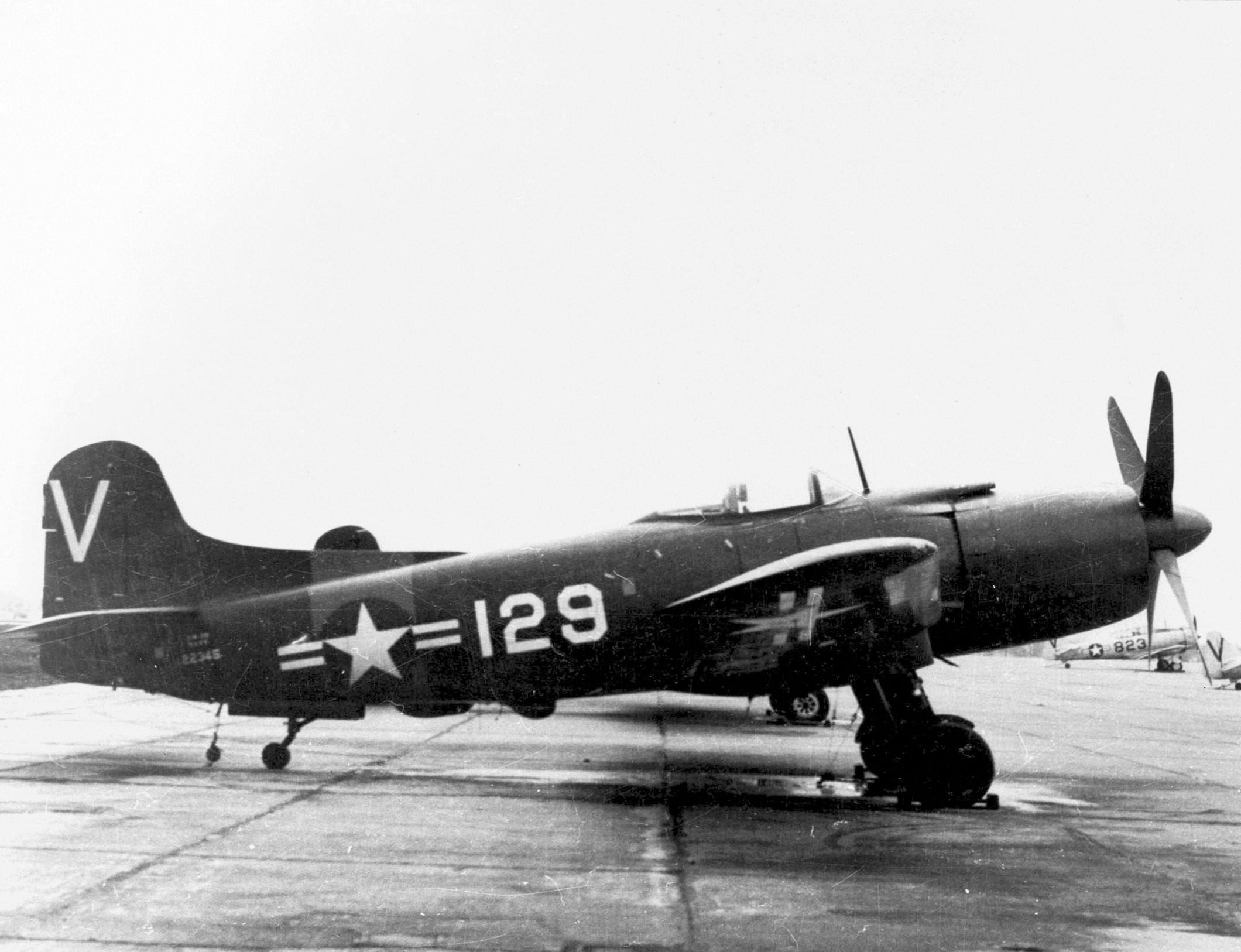
A Naval Air Reserve AM-1Q

The AM-1Q was developed for electronic countermeasures duties. The fuselage fuel tank was removed to make room for the electronics operator and his equipment in a windowless compartment. The aircraft carried several radio and radar receivers, transmitters and a signal analyzer. The operator could also drop bundles of chaff through a chute to block radar signals.

Pilots found the Mauler a heavy-handling aircraft which was difficult to fly in formation and hard to land aboard a carrier because a less-than-perfect landing often caused the aircraft to bounce over the arresting wires and into the safety barrier. It was a very stable dive bomber, more so than the Skyraider, and could carry more ordnance. Maintenance problems and the difficulty of landing aboard a carrier caused some pilots to give it the nickname of "Awful Monster".

== Operational history ==
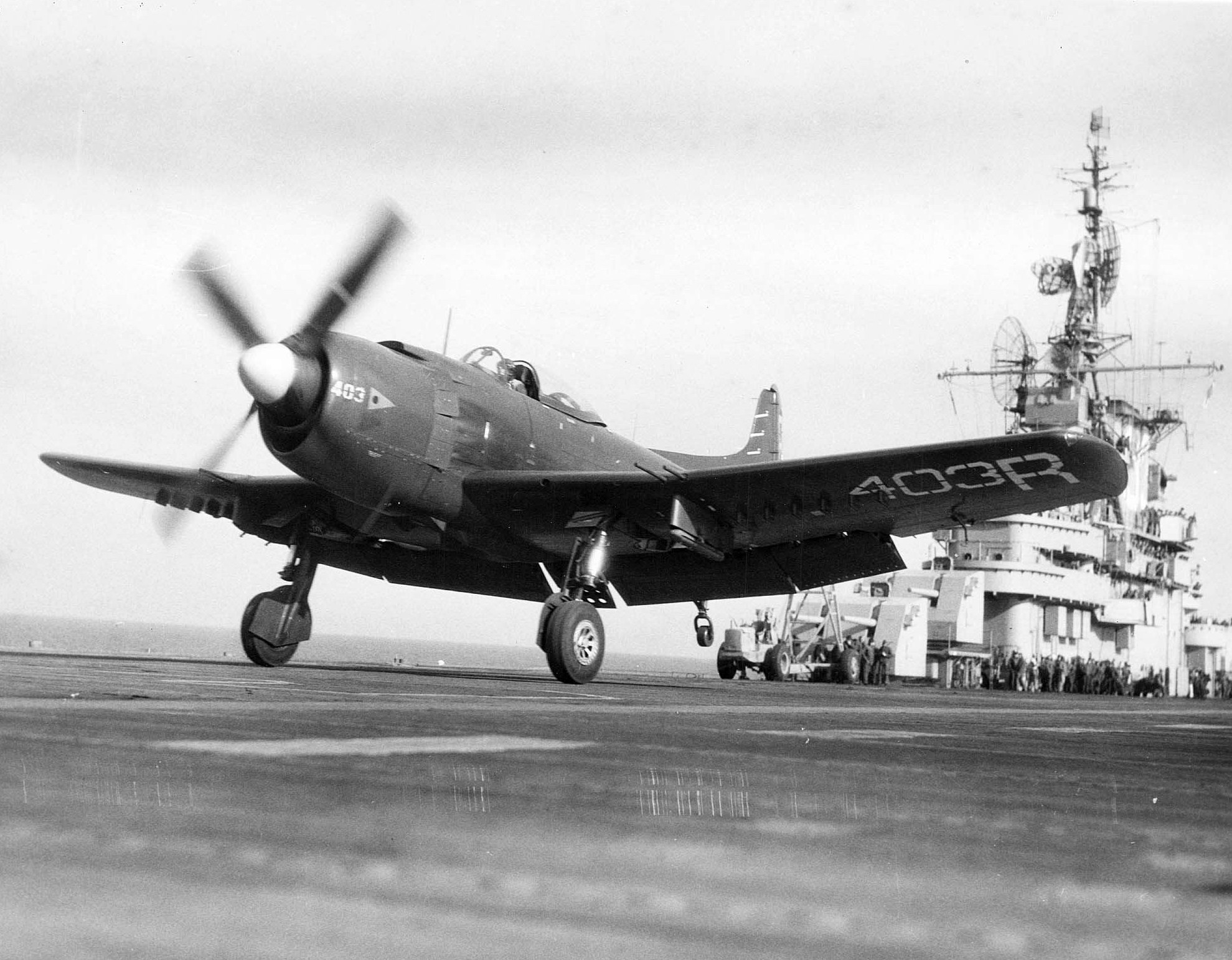
A VA-174 AM-1 taking off from USS Kearsarge on 27 December 1948

With the prospect of flying the AD-1 Skyraider and AM-1 in carrier operations, the US Navy assigned the Maulers to Atlantic Fleet squadrons. Attack Squadron 17A (VA-17A) was the first unit to get the AM-1 and received its 18 aircraft in March and April 1948. It was redesignated VA-174 on 11 August and began carrier qualification trials aboard USS Kearsarge on 27–28 December and completed them aboard USS Leyte in January 1949 with all assigned pilots completing their day qualifications. During this latter deployment, the squadron participated in the unsuccessful search for the British South American Airways Avro Tudor airliner 'Star Ariel' missing in the Caribbean. The squadron made a brief deployment aboard USS Midway, one of the largest carriers in the US Navy, in early 1949. The longer flight deck of the Midway-class carriers made landings easier for the AM-1 pilots and the squadron did not have a single landing accident during its deployment. Upon its return, the unit transferred its aircraft to VA-44 and VA-45, both newly assigned to Midway, and converted to the Skyraider before being disbanded in January 1950.

The two squadrons began receiving their aircraft in March 1949 and conducted their carrier qualifications from 2 to 7 May. VA-45 became the only Mauler squadron to complete qualifications without any accidents. They made a short deployment aboard the carrier from 1 to 9 September and began converting back to Skyraiders the following month.

Carrier Air Group 8 (CVG-8) was established on 15 September 1948 in response to the Berlin Blockade with newly qualified pilots and reservists who volunteered for active duty. VA-84 and VA-85, the air group's attack squadrons, began receiving Maulers in November and the last aircraft was delivered in January 1949. Later that month the air group made a flyover of President Harry Truman's inauguration ceremony. The squadron conducted their qualifications aboard Midway from 3 to 6 May with ten Maulers crashing into the safety barrier between them. CVG-8 made a two-week cruise aboard Midway beginning on 27 June along the East Coast of the United States, before it was disbanded in November after the peaceful resolution of the Berlin Blockade.

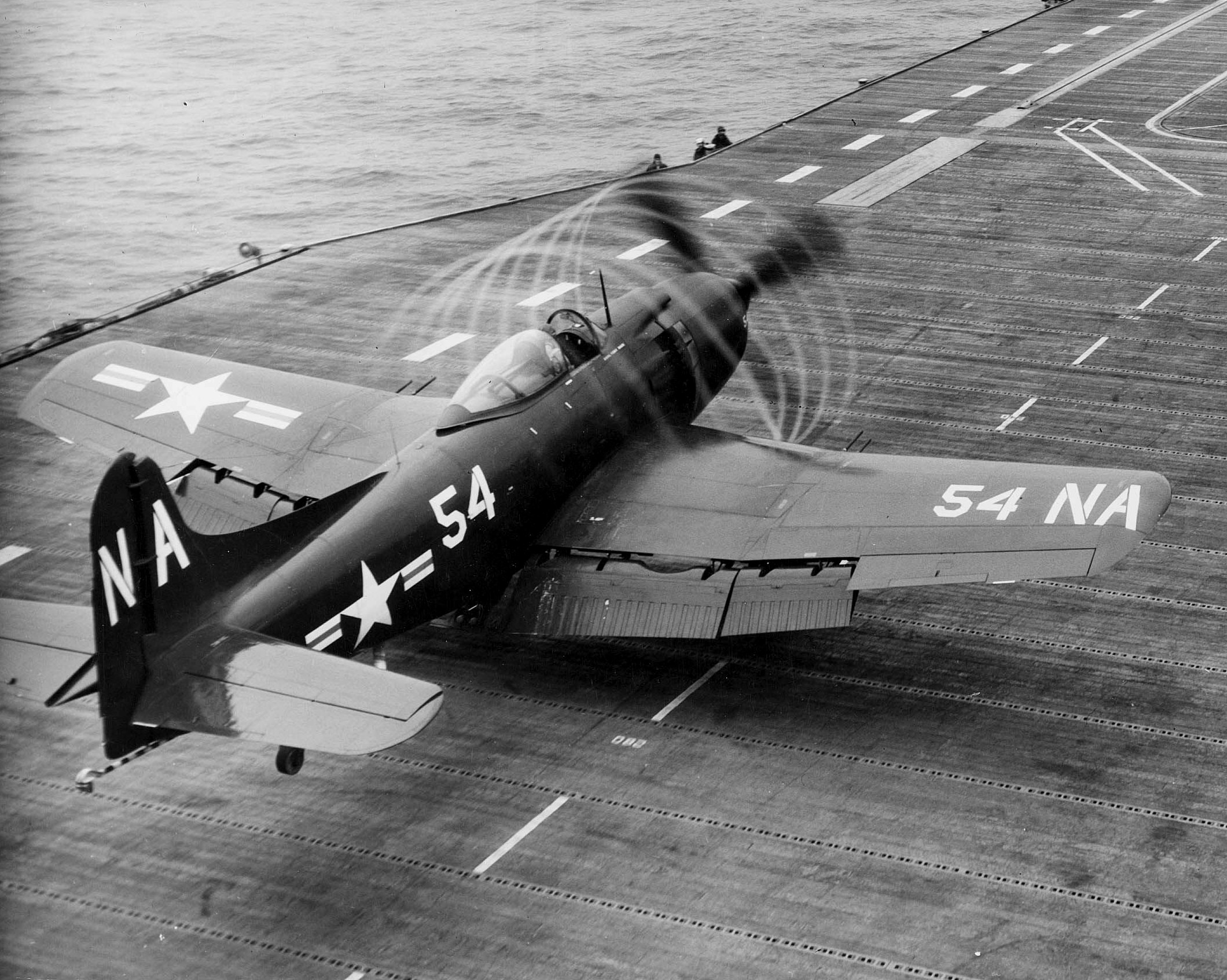
An AM-1Q of VC-4 prepares to take off from Kearsarge in 1949. The spirals are formed by wingtip vortices from the propeller blades.

Many of the AM-1Q electronic-warfare variants were assigned to Composite Squadron 4 (VC-4), based at NAS Atlantic City, and were detached in small groups for each Atlantic Fleet carrier deployment. Little is known about their service and the squadron is last known to have had Maulers assigned on 1 October 1950.

Although the Skyraider was a third smaller and carried a third less bombload, it proved more reliable in service and easier to fly and land, and Navy pilots preferred it. In 1950 the decision was made to use the Mauler only from shore-based units and later that year all but Naval Reserve units abandoned the type. The aircraft operated with reserve squadrons until 1953.

== Variants ==
XBTM-1
Two prototypes built.
BTM-1/AM-1
A total of 131 production aircraft, another 651 aircraft were cancelled.
AM-1Q
An electronic warfare variant, 18 aircraft built or converted. (Note: Sources differ on the number of AM-1Qs built. This may be a product of aircraft converted to the configuration rather than built that way.)
JR2M-1
Proposed carrier onboard delivery variant of the AM, named Mercury; not built.

== Operators ==
United States

- United States Navy
  - VA-44, VA-45, VA-84, VA-85, VA-174, VC-4.
  - Reserve attack squadrons at NAS Grosse Ile, NAS St. Louis, NAS Glenview, NAS Dallas, NAS Columbus, and NAS Atlanta.

== Surviving aircraft ==
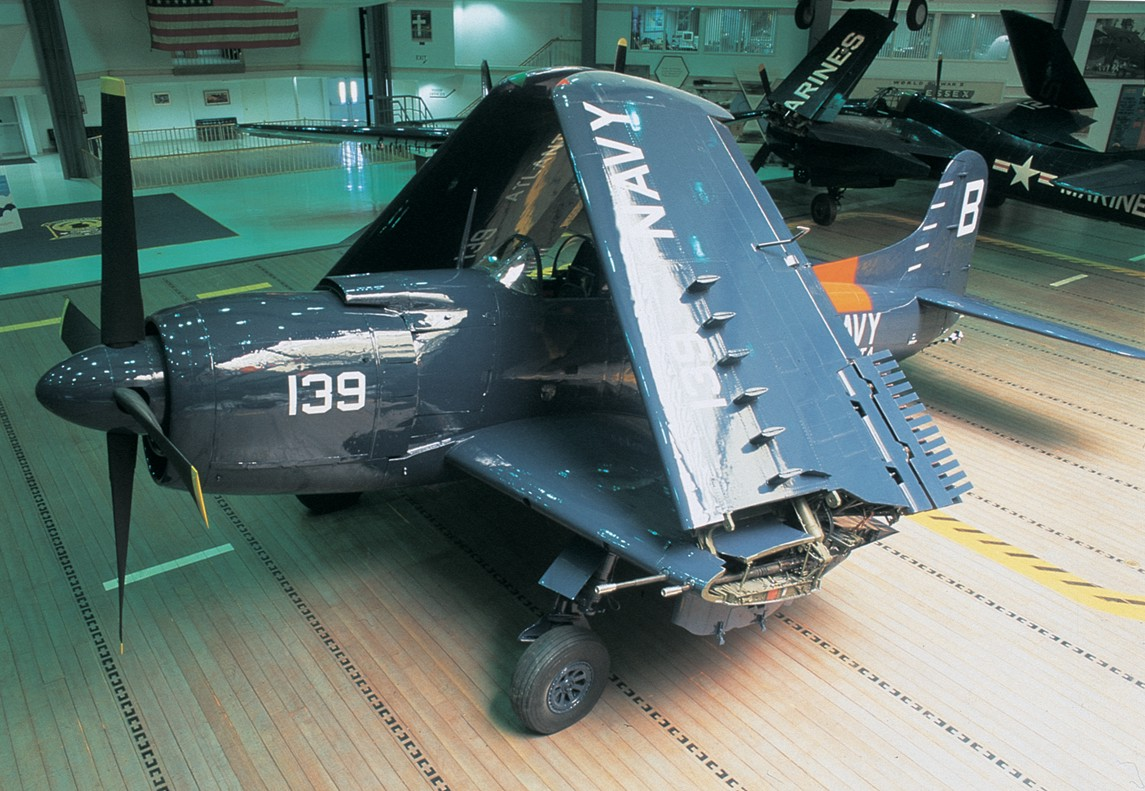
AM-1 at the National Museum of Naval Aviation.

Out of 151 Maulers built, only four complete airframes are known to still exist, with a fifth partial airframe in storage:

On display

AM-1

- 22275 – Erickson Aircraft Collection, Madras, Oregon.
- 122397 – National Naval Aviation Museum in Pensacola, Florida.

In storage or under restoration

AM-1

- 22260 – under restoration at the Glenn L. Martin Maryland Aviation Museum in Middle River, Maryland.
- 122403 – in storage at the Planes of Fame in Chino, California.

== Specifications (AM-1 Mauler) ==
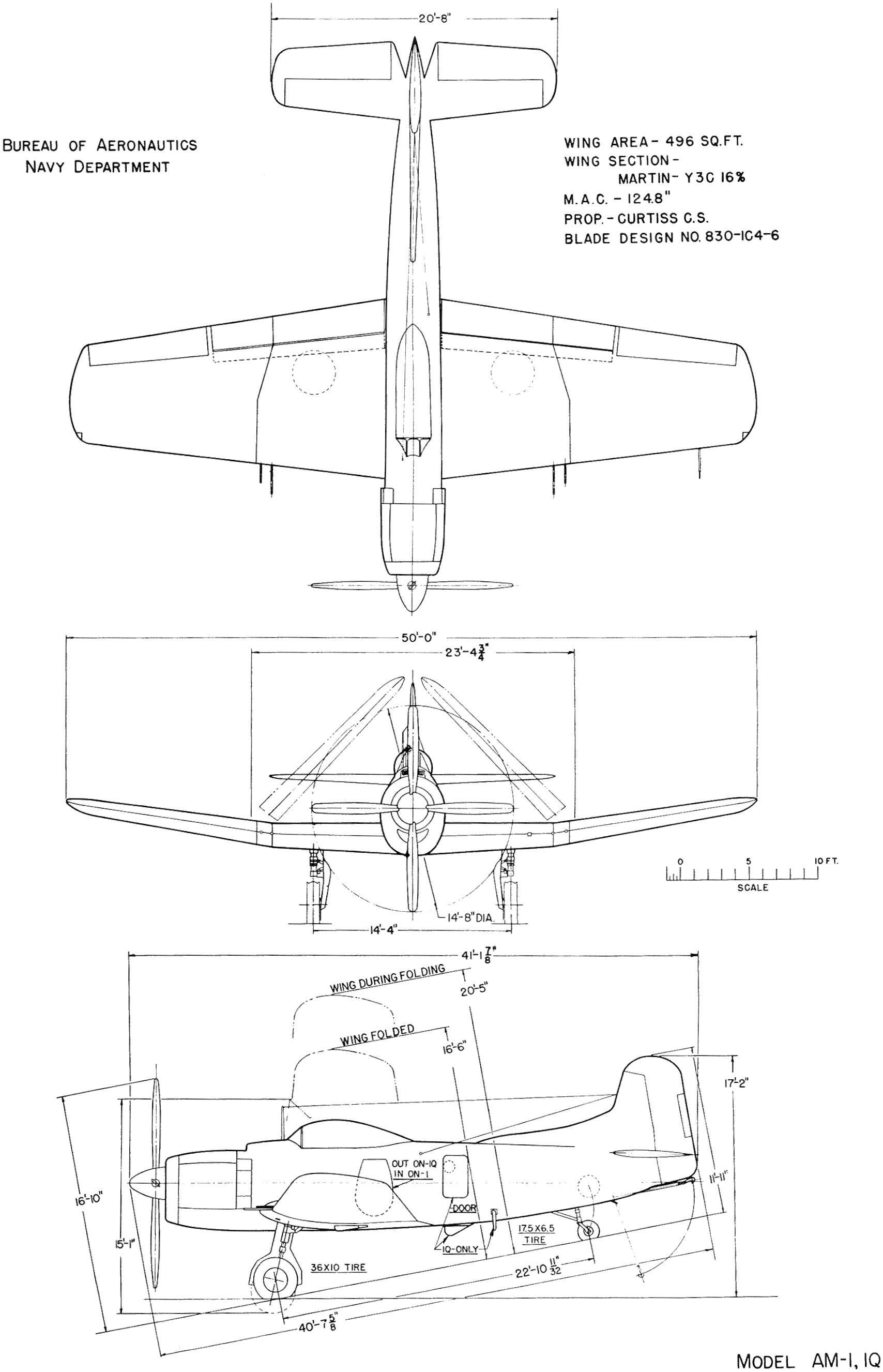
3-view line drawing of the Martin AM-1 Mauler

Data from American Combat Aircraft of the 20th Century

General characteristics

- Crew: one (two for AM-1Q)
- Length: 41 ft 3 in (12.57 m)
- Wingspan: 50 ft 0 in (15.24 m)
- Height: 16 ft 10 in (5.13 m)
- Wing area: 496 sq ft (46.1 m^{2})
- Empty weight: 15,257 lb (6,920 kg)
- Gross weight: 25,737 lb (11,674 kg)
- Fuel capacity: 510 US gallons (1,900 L; 420 imp gal)
- Powerplant: 1 × Pratt & Whitney R-4360-4 Wasp Major Radial, 3,000 hp (2,200 kW)
- Propellers: 4-bladed, 14 ft 8 in (4.47 m) diameter

Performance

- Maximum speed: 334 mph (538 km/h, 290 kn)
- Cruise speed: 189 mph (304 km/h, 164 kn)
- Combat range: 1,524 mi (2,452 km, 1,324 nmi)
- Service ceiling: 27,000 ft (8,200 m)
- Time to altitude: 5.9 minutes to 10,000 feet (3,048 m)
- Wing loading: 48.7 lb/sq ft (238 kg/m^{2})

Armament

- Guns: 4 20 mm (0.79 in) T-31 cannon with 200 rounds per gun
- Hardpoints: 15
- Rockets: 12 5-inch (130 mm) HVAR
- Missiles: 3 Mark 13 torpedoes

== See also ==
Aircraft of comparable role, configuration, and era

- Blackburn Firebrand
- Blackburn Firecrest
- Curtiss XBT2C
- Douglas A-1 Skyraider
- Douglas XTB2D Skypirate
- Kaiser-Fleetwings XBTK
- Westland Wyvern

Related lists

- List of attack aircraft
- List of United States Navy aircraft designations (pre-1962)

== Bibliography ==
- Andrade, John. U.S. Military Aircraft Designations and Serials Since 1909. Midland Counties Publications, 1979. ISBN 0-904597-22-9
- Andrews, Hal & Walter Boyne. The Fable of Able Mable: Flying Fifteen Tons of Midnight Blue Beastie. Airpower, Vol. 4, Issue 4, July 1974.
- Breihan, John R., Stan Piet & Roger S. Mason. Martin Aircraft, 1909–1960. Santa Ana, California: Narkiewicz/Thompson, 1995. ISBN 0-913322-03-2
- Kowalski, Bob. Martin AM-1/1-Q Mauler. Simi Valley, California: Ginter Books, 1995. ISBN 0-942612-24-8.
- Swanborough, Gordon & Peter M. Bowers. United States Navy Aircraft Since 1911. London: Putnam Aeronautical Books, 1990. Third edition. ISBN 0-85177-838-0.
- Wagner, Ray. American Combat Planes of the 20th Century. Reno, Nevada: Jack Bacon, 2004. ISBN 0-930083-17-2
