= Kaiser-Fleetwings XBTK =

American dive and torpedo bomber

XBTK
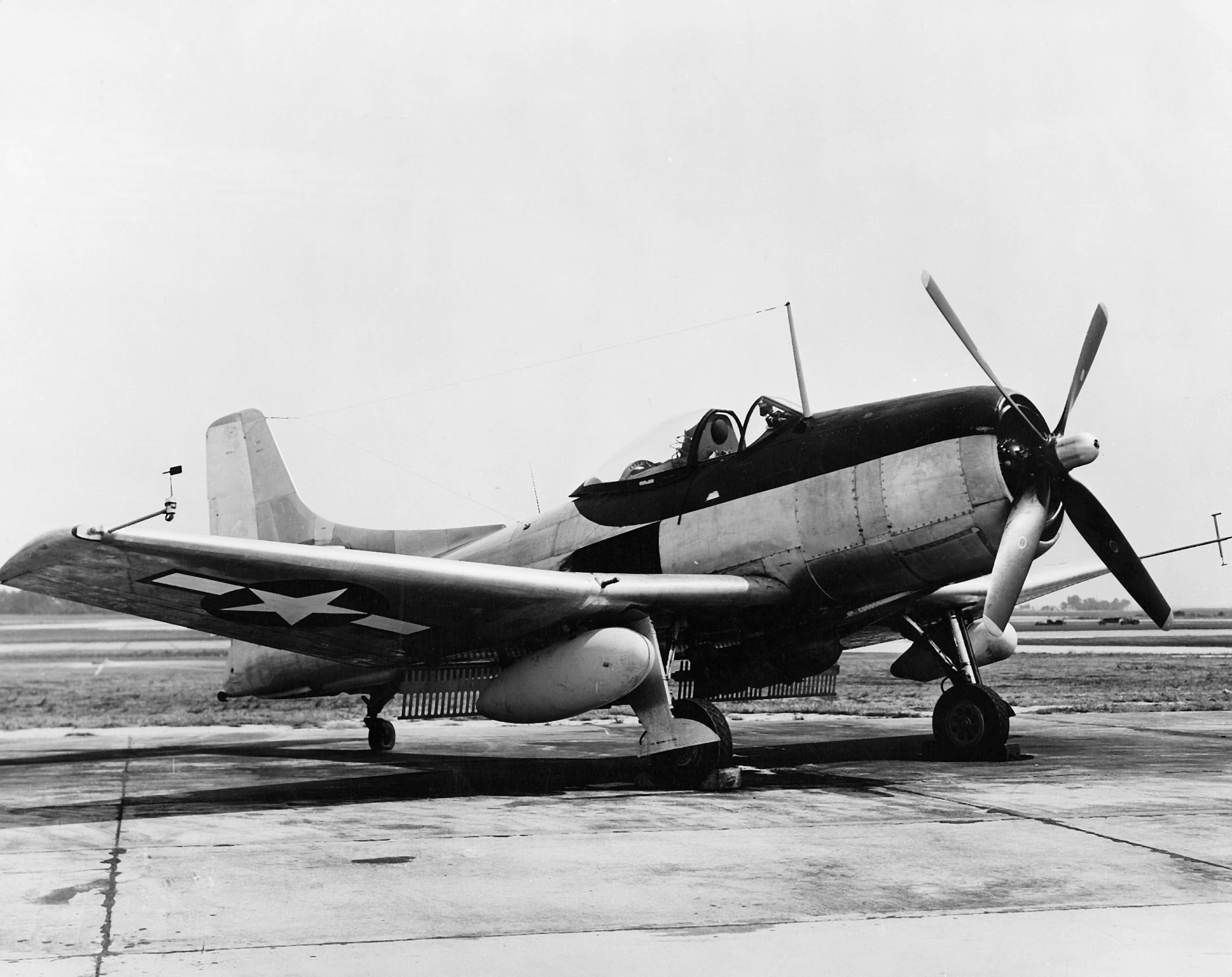
- Kaiser-Fleetwings XBTK-1

General information
- Type: Dive bomber and torpedo bomber
- National origin: United States
- Manufacturer: Kaiser-Fleetwings
- Primary user: United States Navy
- Number built: 5

History
- First flight: 12 April 1945

The Kaiser-Fleetwings XBTK was an American dive and torpedo bomber developed by Kaiser-Fleetwings for the United States Navy starting in 1944. After only five examples had been built, with the first two being flying prototypes; the contract was terminated in September 1946.

== Development ==
In early 1942, the U.S. Navy's Bureau of Aeronautics (BuAer) was planning the replacements for the Curtiss SB2C Helldiver dive bomber and the Grumman TBF Avenger torpedo bomber. The aircraft was to carry the torpedo in an internal bomb bay. By late 1943 it became obvious that the proposed VBT design like the Douglas SB2D had drastically increased in size and weight. Consequently, the U.S. Navy initiated a smaller dive bomber design, intended for escort carrier operation. The BuAer recognized the engineering workload for the major wartime programs and therefore assigned the design to companies without a major wartime production contract. BuAer selected Fleetwings at Bristol, Pennsylvania (USA), which was acquired by Henry J. Kaiser in 1943.

The XBK dive bomber program was initiated in February 1944 with a contract for two prototypes. To keep the aircraft size down, it was decided that all stores would be carried externally. A radar could be carried underneath the left wing. The dive brakes were of the lower and upper picket fence type at the inboard wing trailing edge. The horizontal tail was mounted on the tailfin above the fuselage. This feature avoided empennage buffet when the dive brakes were open. The placement of the engine exhausts was unusual, being almost aft of the cockpit. It was hoped that this feature would significantly decrease drag.

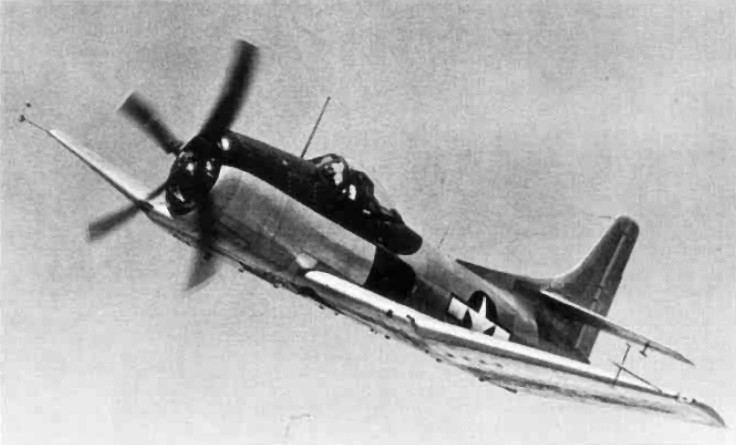
The XBTK-1 in flight, 1945.

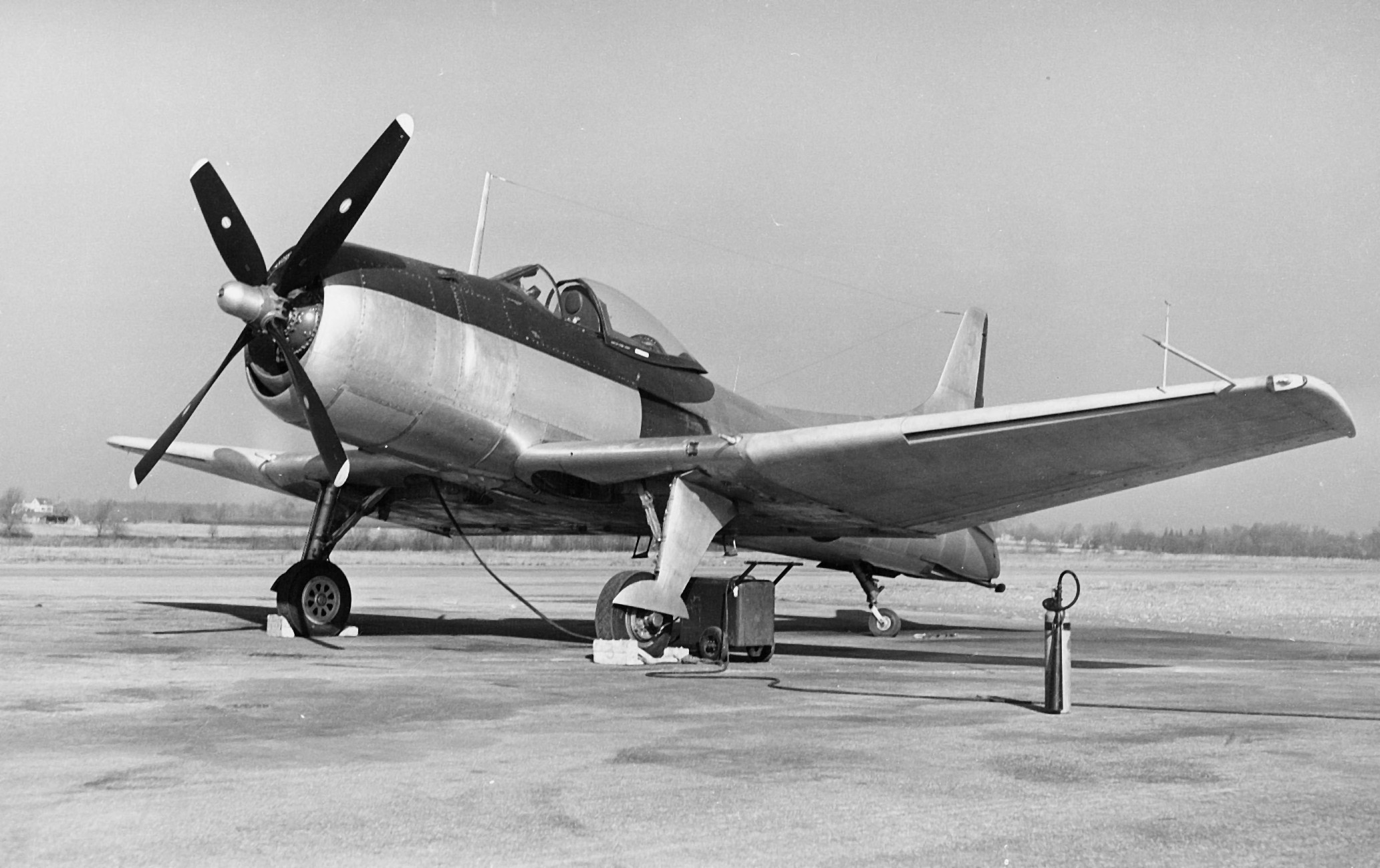
Second XBTK-1 with leading edge slats.

A mockup inspection without engine was carried out in April 1944 while the engine was installed in May 1944, with completion of the first prototype scheduled for November 1944. To speed up later production, the U.S. Navy even constructed a new airfield at the Fleetwing plant. In early 1945, BuAer requested that the aircraft would be able to carry a torpedo. The weapon was fitted to a new centreline station and the designation was changed to XBTK. The first XBTK-1 was finally completed in March 1945, making its first flight on 12 April 1945.

== Operational history ==
The flight testing revealed inadequate engine cooling and severe fuselage vibration. Resolution of these problems and the replacement of the R-2800-22W engine, which was already out of production, by the -34 delayed restart of flight trials until July 1945. The aircraft was delivered to the U.S. Navy Naval Air Test Center at Naval Air Station Patuxent River, Maryland, in August 1945 for evaluation. After the end of World War II, the U.S. Navy cut orders from 20 to 10 aircraft. Test results recommended replacement of the novel exhaust system with a conventional system, as the cockpit temperature was very high and cockpit entry and exit after an engine shutdown was extremely difficult. It also noted that stall performance was poor, particularly with power off. It was noted, however, that diving characteristics were superior to any dive bomber in service or under development.

The aircraft was transported back to Fleetwings where redesign began. The second production aircraft first flew in March 1946 and featured built-in leading edge slots which greatly improved the stall performance of the aircraft. However, by early 1946 procurement of new aircraft was drastically cut down and the BTK found its role already filled by the Douglas AD Skyraider and Martin AM Mauler. In May 1946 it was decided to complete five airframes already in production. Continued testing revealed problems when the aircraft was put in a spin, and the U.S. Navy finally terminated the contract on 3 September 1946, as there was no need for the aircraft anymore. The five prototypes were scrapped, with the two "flying" examples broken up by April 1946.

== Variants ==
XBTK-1
five prototypes built (BuNos 44313-14, 90484-86)

== Operators ==
United States
United States Navy

== Specifications (XBTK-1) ==
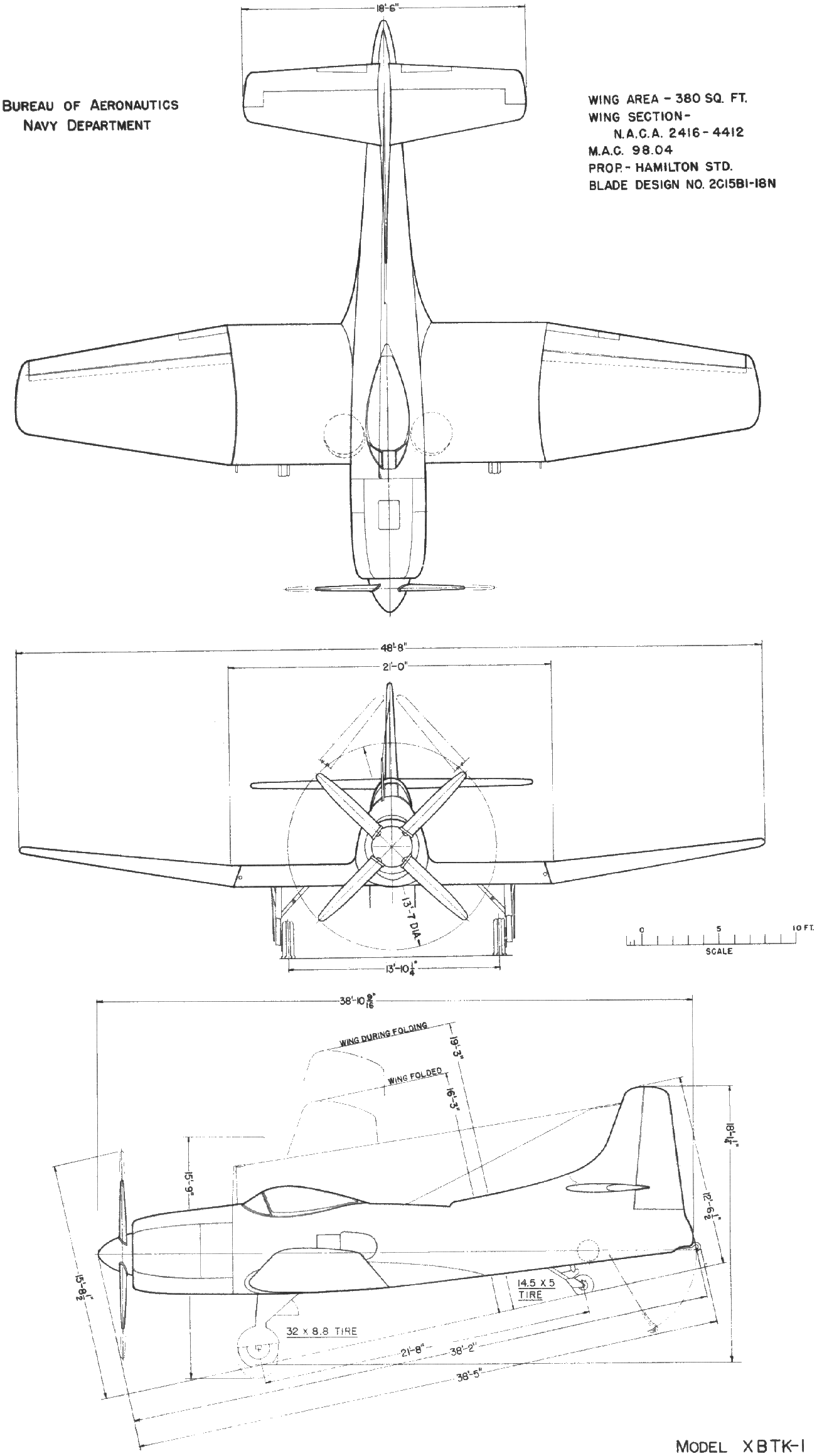
3-view line drawing of the Kaiser-Fleetwings XBTK-1

Data from From Torpedo and Scout Bombers to Attack Aircraft

General characteristics

- Crew: one (pilot)
- Length: 38 ft 11 in (11.86 m)
- Wingspan: 48 ft 8 in (14.83 m)
- Height: 15 ft 8 in (4.78 m)
- Wing area: 380 sq ft (35 m^{2})
- Empty weight: 9,959 lb (4,517 kg)
- Gross weight: 15,782 lb (7,159 kg)
- Powerplant: 1 × Pratt & Whitney R-2800-34W 18-cylinder radial piston engine, 2,100 hp (1,600 kW)

Performance

- Maximum speed: 373 mph (600 km/h, 324 kn)
- Range: 1,400 mi (2,300 km, 1,200 nmi)
- Service ceiling: 33,400 ft (10,200 m)
- Rate of climb: 3,550 ft/min (18.0 m/s)

Armament

- Guns: 2 × 20 mm cannon
- Hardpoints: one centreline station, 2,000 lb (910 kg) capacity; two wing stations, 1,000 lb (450 kg) capacity each; eight wing launchers for 5 in (127 mm) High Velocity Aircraft Rockets.

== See also ==
Aircraft of comparable role, configuration, and era

- Curtiss XBTC
- Douglas AD Skyraider
- Martin AM Mauler

Related lists

- List of attack aircraft
- List of United States Navy aircraft designations (pre-1962)
