= List of aircraft of the United States during World War II =

A list of USAAF, USN, USCG, and USMC aircraft from World War II.

== United States Coast Guard ==
Aircraft	Manufacturer	Type	Role	Entered service	Number in Service
Consolidated PBY-5A Catalina	Consolidated Aircraft	Amphibious flying boat	Various	1941	114
Curtiss SOC-4 Seagull	Curtiss-Wright	Seaplane	Scout	1938	4
Douglas RD Dolphin	Douglas Aircraft Company	Amphibious flying boat	Transport and search and rescue	1931	13
Fairchild J2K	Fairchild Aviation Corporation	Single-engine monoplane	Liaison, trainer, light cargo	1936	4
Grumman JF-2 Duck	Grumman	Amphibious single-engine biplane	Transport and search and rescue	October 1934	14
Grumman JRF Goose	Grumman	Amphibious flying boat	Various	1939	34
Grumman J4F-1 Widgeon	Grumman	Amphibious flying boat	Coastal anti-submarine patrol	July 1941	25
NAF Hall PH	Naval Aircraft Factory	Flying boat	Patrol and search and rescue	April 1938	14
Lockheed Lodestar	Lockheed	Passenger aircraft	Executive transport	May 1940	8
NAF N3N-3	Naval Aircraft Factory	Tandem Biplane	Trainer	December 1940	4
Vultee BT-13 Valiant	Vultee Aircraft	Tandem Monoplane	Trainer	1942	11

== United States Navy ==
- Aeronca LNR - Observation/liaison/trainer
- Beechcraft SNB Navigator - Trainer
- Beechcraft JRB - Transport
- Beechcraft GB Traveler - Transport
- Bell XF2L Airacomet - Jet fighter
- Boeing PB Flying Fortress - Heavy bomber
- Boeing 314 Clipper - Impressed flying boat transport
- Boeing XF8B - Prototype carrier-based fighter-bomber
- Boeing XPBB Sea Ranger - Flying boat/patrol bomber
- Brewster F2A Buffalo - Carrier-based fighter
- Brewster SBA/Naval Aircraft Factory SBN - Carrier-based scout bomber/trainer
- Brewster SB2A Buccaneer - Carrier-based scout bomber
- Budd RB-1 Conestoga - Transport
- Cessna JRC - Transport
- Consolidated PB4Y-1 Liberator - Patrol bomber
- Consolidated PB4Y-2 Privateer - Patrol bomber
- Consolidated PBY/PBN Catalina - Seaplane patrol bomber
- Consolidated PB2Y Coronado - Flying boat/patrol bomber
- Consolidated XP4Y Corregidor - Flying boat/patrol bomber
- Culver TDC - Radio-controlled drone
- Culver TD2C - Radio-controlled drone
- Curtiss F11C Goshawk - Biplane fighter
- Curtiss R5C Commando - Transport
- Curtiss XF14C - Prototype carrier-based fighter
- Curtiss SBC Helldiver - Carrier-based scout bomber
- Curtiss SB2C Helldiver - Carrier-based dive bomber
- Curtiss SOC Seagull - Observation aircraft
- Curtiss SO3C Seamew - Observation aircraft
- Curtiss SC Seahawk - ASW aircraft
- Curtiss SNC Falcon - Trainer
- Douglas BD Havoc - Attack bomber
- Douglas BTD Destroyer - Carrier-based torpedo bomber
- Douglas A-26 Invader - Attack bomber
- Douglas RD Dolphin - Amphibian flying boat transport
- Douglas R2D - Transport
- Douglas R3D - Transport
- Douglas R4D - Transport
- Douglas R5D - Transport
- Douglas SBD Dauntless - Carrier-based dive bomber
- Douglas TBD Devastator - Carrier-based torpedo bomber
- Fairchild JK - Liaison
- Fairchild J2K/GK - Liaison/trainer
- Goodyear FG Corsair - Carrier-based fighter/bomber
- General Motors FM Wildcat - Carrier-based fighter
- Great Lakes BG - Target drone (withdrawn as carrier bomber)
- Grumman F3F - Carrier-based fighter
- Grumman F4F Wildcat - Carrier-based fighter
- Grumman XF5F Skyrocket - Carrier-based prototype fighter
- Grumman F6F Hellcat - Carrier-based fighter
- Grumman F7F Tigercat - Carrier-based fighter
- Grumman F8F Bearcat - Carrier-based fighter
- Grumman JRF Goose - Flying boat
- Grumman J4F Widgeon - Flying boat
- Grumman JF Duck - Amphibian shipboard spotter
- Grumman J2F Duck - Amphibian shipboard spotter
- Grumman TBF/TBM Avenger - Carrier-based torpedo-bomber
- Howard GH/NH Nightingale - Liaison/ambulance aircraft
- Interstate TDR - Assault drone
- Lockheed JO - Transport/gunnery trainer
- Lockheed R2O Electra - Transport
- Lockheed R5O Lodestar - Transport
- Lockheed PBO - Patrol bomber
- Lockheed PV-1 Ventura - Patrol bomber
- Lockheed PV-2 Harpoon - Patrol bomber
- Lockheed FO-1 - Fighter
- Martin JM Marauder - Medium bomber
- Martin JRM Mars - Transport flying boat
- Martin M-130 - Impressed flying boat
- Martin PBM Mariner - Flying boat
- Martin PB2M Mars - Prototype patrol flying boat
- Naval Aircraft Factory N3N - Trainer
- Naval Aircraft Factory TDN - Assault drone
- North American NJ-1 - Trainer
- North American PBJ Mitchell - Medium/anti-ship bomber
- North American SNJ - Trainer
- North American ETF-51D - Fighter
- Northrop BT-1 - Dive bomber (withdrawn 1944)
- Piper LNP - Training glider
- Piper NE - Observation/liaison aircraft
- Pratt-Read LNE - Training glider
- Ryan FR Fireball - Carrier-based mixed-propulsion fighter
- Ryan NR Recruit - Trainer
- Schweizer LNS - Training glider
- Sikorsky HNS - Helicopter
- Sikorsky HO2S - Helicopter
- Sikorsky HO3S - Helicopter
- Sikorsky JRS - Transport amphibian
- Sikorsky JR2S - Impressed transport flying boat
- Sikorsky XPBS-1 - Patrol flying boat
- Stearman N2S - Trainer
- Stinson OY Sentinel - Observation/liaison aircraft
- Stinson R3Q - Trainer/utility aircraft
- Spartan NP - Trainer
- Taylorcraft LNT - Observation/liaison aircraft
- Timm N2T Tutor - Trainer
- Vought F4U Corsair - Carrier-based fighter
- Vought O3U Corsair - Scout
- Vought OS2U Kingfisher - Observation aircraft
- Vought SBU - Carrier-based dive bomber (withdrawn 1943)
- Vought SB2U Vindicator - Carrier-based dive bomber
- Vought TBU Sea Wolf/Consolidated TBY Sea Wolf - Carrier-based torpedo-bomber
- Vought V-173 - Experimental aircraft
- Vultee SNV - Trainer
- Waco LRW - Troop glider
- Waco YKS-7 - Transport/liaison

== United States Marine Corps ==
- Allied Aviation XLRA - Transport flying-boat glider
- Brewster F2A Buffalo - Fighter
- Consolidated PBY Catalina - Patrol bomber
- Consolidated PB4Y-2 Privateer - Patrol bomber
- Curtiss R5C Commando - Transport
- Curtiss SBC Helldiver - Dive bomber
- Curtiss SB2C Helldiver - Dive bomber
- Douglas BD Havoc - Attack/medium bomber/target tug
- Douglas RD Dolphin - Amphibian transport
- Douglas R3D - Transport
- Douglas R4D Skytrain - Transport
- Douglas R5D Skymaster - Transport
- Douglas SBD Dauntless - Dive bomber
- Grumman F4F Wildcat - Fighter
- Grumman F6F Hellcat - Fighter/night fighter
- Grumman JRF Goose - Amphibian transport
- Grumman TBF Avenger - Torpedo bomber
- Lockheed JO-2 - Transport
- Lockheed R5O Lodestar - Transport
- Lockheed PV-1 Ventura - Patrol bomber
- Martin JM Marauder - Attack/medium bomber/target tug
- North American PBJ Mitchell - Attack/medium bomber
- North American SNJ - Trainer
- Northrop F2T Black Widow - Night fighter
- Pratt-Read LNE - Training glider
- Schweizer LNS - Training glider
- Stinson OY Sentinel - Observation/liaison aircraft
- Vought F4U Corsair - Fighter bomber/night fighter
- Vought SB2U Vindicator - Dive bomber

== United States Army Air Forces/Corps ==
- Aeronca L-3 - Observation/liaison aircraft
- Airspeed Oxford - Trainer
- Avro AT-20 Anson - Trainer
- Beechcraft XA-38 Grizzly - Prototype attack bomber
- Beechcraft C-45 Expeditor - Transport/trainer
- Beechcraft AT-10 Wichita - Advanced trainer
- Bell YFM-1 Airacuda - Interceptor
- Bell P-39 Airacobra - Fighter
- Bell P-59 Airacomet - Jet fighter
- Bell P-63 Kingcobra - Fighter
- Bell XP-77 - Prototype lightweight fighter
- Boeing P-26 Peashooter - Fighter
- Boeing XB-15/XC-105 - Long-range bomber/transport
- Boeing B-17 Flying Fortress - Heavy bomber
- Boeing B-29 Superfortress - Heavy bomber
- Boeing-Stearman PT-17 Kaydet - Primary trainer
- Boulton Paul Defiant - Trainer/target tug
- Brewster 339C/D Buffalo - ex-Dutch KNIL-ML fighter
- Bristol Beaufighter - Fighter
- Budd C-93 Conestoga - Transport
- Cessna AT-8/AT-17/UC-78 - Advanced trainer/light transport
- Consolidated B-24 Liberator - Heavy bomber
- Consolidated B-32 Dominator - Heavy bomber
- Consolidated OA-10 Catalina - Army PBY flying boat/patrol bomber
- Consolidated Vultee XP-81 - Fighter
- Vultee XA-41 - Prototype ground attack aircraft
- Culver PQ-8/A-8 - Radio-controlled target aircraft
- Culver PQ-14 Cadet - Radio-controlled target aircraft
- Curtiss A-12 Shrike - Attack bomber
- Curtiss XA-14/Curtiss A-18 Shrike - Attack bomber
- Curtiss-Wright AT-9 Jeep - Advanced twin-engine pilot trainer
- Curtiss-Wright C-46 Commando - Transport
- Curtiss-Wright C-76 Caravan - Transport
- Curtiss O-52 Owl - Observation aircraft
- Curtiss P-36 Hawk - Fighter
- Curtiss XP-37 - Prototype fighter
- Curtiss P-40 Warhawk/Kittyhawk/Tomahawk - Fighter
- Curtiss XP-46 - Prototype fighter
- Curtiss-Wright XP-55 Ascender - Prototype fighter
- Curtiss YP-60 - Fighter
- Curtiss XP-62 - Prototype fighter
- Curtiss A-25 Shrike Army SB2C - Dive bomber
- de Havilland F-8 Mosquito - Reconnaissance aircraft
- Douglas A-20 Havoc - Attack bomber
- Douglas A-26 Invader - Attack bomber
- Douglas XA/XB-42 Mixmaster - Prototype bomber
- Douglas B-18 Bolo - ASW/medium bomber
- Douglas XBLR-2/XB-19 - Prototype heavy bomber
- Douglas B-23 Dragon - Medium bomber
- Douglas C-32 - Transport
- Douglas C-47 Skytrain - Transport
- Douglas C-54 Skymaster - Transport
- Douglas C-110 - ex-Dutch Douglas DC-5 transport
- Douglas O-31 - Observation aircraft
- Douglas O-43 - Observation aircraft
- Douglas O-46 - Observation aircraft
- Douglas A-24 Dauntless - Army SBD dive bomber
- Grumman OA-9 Goose - Army JRF flying boat
- Grumman OA-14 Widgeon - Army J4F patrol aircraft
- Fairchild UC-61/86 Argus - Liaison aircraft/trainer
- Fairchild AT-21 Gunner - Advanced/gunnery trainer
- Fairchild PT-19/23/23 - Primary trainer
- Federal AT-20 - Ansons purchased for Lend-Lease as bomber trainer
- Fisher XP-75 Eagle - Prototype fighter
- Fleetwings BT-12 - Basic trainer
- Howard UC-70 Nightingale - Liaison aircraft
- Interstate L-6 Grasshopper - Observation/liaison aircraft
- Lockheed UC-101 Vega - Executive transport
- Lockheed UC-85 Orion - Executive transport
- Lockheed C-36/Model 10 Electra - Transport
- Lockheed C-40/Model 12 Electra Junior - Transport/gunnery trainer
- Lockheed C-56/C-57/C-59/C-60/C-66/C-104 Lodestar - Transport
- Lockheed A-29 Hudson - Patrol bomber
- Lockheed C-69 Constellation - Transport
- Lockheed B-34/B-37 Lexington - Medium bomber
- Lockheed P-38 Lightning - Fighter
- Lockheed P-80 Shooting Star - Jet fighter
- Martin A-30 Baltimore - Lend-lease attack bomber
- Martin B-10/Martin B-12 - Medium bombers
- Martin B-26 Marauder - Medium bomber
- McDonnell XP-67 - Prototype fighter
- Noorduyn C-64 Norseman - Transport
- North American A-36 Invader/Apache - Dive bomber/attack aircraft
- North American B-25 Mitchell - Medium bomber
- North American XB-28 - Prototype medium bomber
- North American BT-9 - Basic trainer
- North American BT-14 - Basic trainer
- North American BC-1 - Basic combat trainer
- North American AT-6 Texan - Advanced trainer
- North American O-47 - Observation aircraft
- North American P-51 Mustang - Fighter
- North American P-64 - Fighter/advanced trainer
- North American F-82 Twin Mustang - Fighter
- Northrop A-13/A-16/A-17/A-33 - Attack aircraft
- Northrop XP-56 Black Bullet - Prototype fighter
- Northrop P-61 Black Widow - Night fighter
- Northrop XP-79 - Prototype interceptor
- Piper L-4 Grasshopper - Observation/liaison aircraft
- Republic P-43 Lancer - Fighter
- Republic P-47 Thunderbolt - Fighter
- Republic XP-72 - Prototype fighter
- Ryan PT-16/PT-22 Recruit - Primary trainer
- St. Louis YPT-15 - Primary trainer
- Seversky AT-12 Guardsman - Advanced trainer
- Seversky BT-8 - Basic trainer
- Seversky P-35 - Fighter
- Sikorsky R-4 & R-6 - Hoverfly helicopters
- Sikorsky R-5 - Helicopter
- Stinson UC-81/AT-19 Reliant - Trainer
- Stinson O-49/L-1 Vigilant - Observation/liaison aircraft
- Stinson O-62/L-5 Sentinel - Liaison aircraft
- Supermarine Spitfire - Fighter/reconnaissance
- Taylorcraft O-57/L-2 Grasshopper - Observation/liaison aircraft
- Vultee A-31/A-35 Vengeance - Dive bomber
- Vultee BT-13/BT-15 Valiant - Basic trainer
- Vultee XP-54 - Prototype fighter
- Vultee P-66 Vanguard - Fighter
- Waco CG-3 - Troop glider
- Waco CG-4 - Troop glider
- Waco PT-14 - Primary trainer
- Westland Lysander - Pater

== Captured ==
- Mitsubishi A6M Zero - Test aircraft for weak spots
- Mitsubishi J2M - Tested for its max speeds
- Nakajima Ki-43
- Nakajima Ki-44
- Kawasaki Ki-45
- Kawasaki Ki-61
- Focke-Wulf Fw 190
- Messerschmitt Bf 109
- Heinkel He 162
- Arado Ar 234
- KG 200
- Me-262

== See also ==
- List of aircraft of World War II
- Military aircraft of the United States
