= Curtiss P-36 Hawk =

American fighter aircraft

P-36 Hawk/Hawk 75/Mohawk
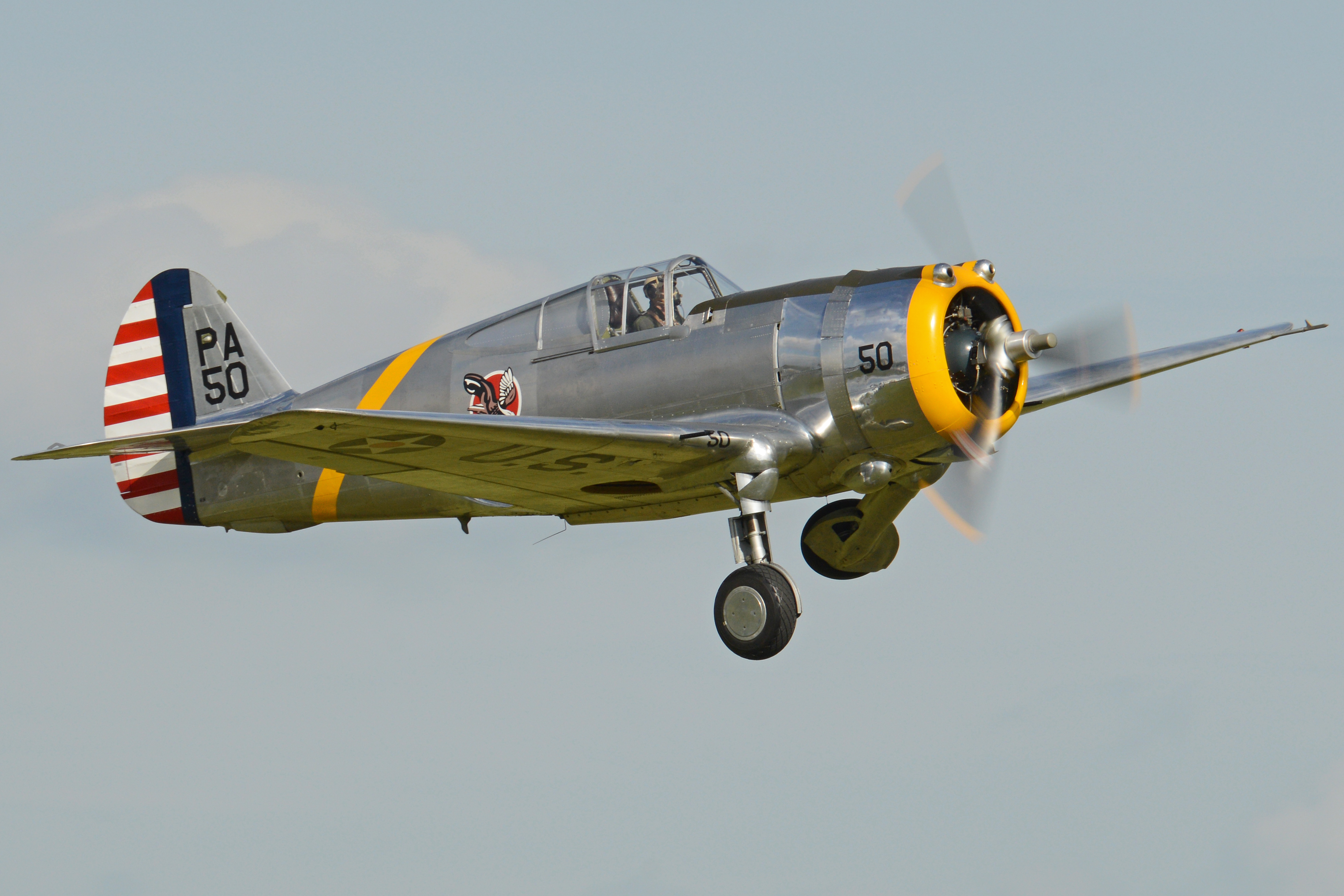
- A P-36C at the Flying Legends Airshow in 2016

General information
- Type: Fighter
- National origin: United States
- Manufacturer: Curtiss-Wright Corporation
- Primary users: United States Army Air Corps Finnish Air Force; French Air Force; Royal Air Force
- Number built: 215 (P-36) plus 900 export Hawk 75 variants

History
- Introduction date: 1938
- First flight: 6 May 1935
- Retired: 1954, Argentina
- Developed into: Curtiss YP-37; Curtiss P-40 Warhawk; Curtiss XP-42

The Curtiss P-36 Hawk, also known as the Curtiss Hawk Model 75, is an American-designed and built fighter aircraft of the 1930s and 40s. A contemporary of the Hawker Hurricane and Messerschmitt Bf 109, it was one of the first of a new generation of combat aircraft—a sleek monoplane design with a retractable undercarriage making extensive use of metal in its construction.

Perhaps best known as the predecessor of the Curtiss P-40 Warhawk, the P-36 saw little combat with the United States Army Air Forces during World War II. It was used most extensively and successfully by the French Air Force during the Battle of France. The P-36 was also ordered by the governments of the Netherlands and Norway but did not arrive in time to see action before both were occupied by Nazi Germany. The type was also manufactured under license in China, for the Republic of China Air Force, as well as in British India, for the Royal Air Force (RAF) and Royal Indian Air Force (RIAF).

Axis and co-belligerent air forces also made significant use of captured P-36s. Following the fall of France and Norway in 1940, several dozen P-36s were seized by Germany and transferred to Finland; these aircraft saw extensive action with the Finnish Air Force against the Soviet Air Forces. The P-36 was also used by Vichy French air forces in several minor conflicts; in one of these, the Franco-Thai War of 1940–41, P-36s were used by both sides.

From mid-1940, some P-36s en route for France and the Netherlands were diverted to Allied air forces in other parts of the world. The Hawks ordered by the Netherlands were diverted to the Dutch East Indies and later saw action against Japanese forces. French orders were taken up by British Commonwealth air forces, and saw combat with the South African Air Force (SAAF) against Italian forces in East Africa, and with the RAF over Burma. Within the Commonwealth, the type was usually referred to as the Curtiss Mohawk.

With around 1,000 aircraft built by Curtiss, the P-36 was a commercial success for the company. It also became the basis of the P-40 and two unsuccessful prototypes: the P-37 and the XP-42.

== Design and development ==
The Curtiss Model 75 was a private venture by the company, designed by former Northrop Aircraft Company engineer Don R. Berlin. The first prototype, constructed in 1934, featured all-metal construction with fabric-covered control surfaces, a Wright XR-1670-5 radial engine developing 900 hp (670 kW), and typical United States Army Air Corps (USAAC) armament of one .30 in (7.62 mm) and one .50 in (12.7 mm) machine gun firing through the propeller arc. Also typical of the time was the total absence of cockpit armor or self-sealing fuel tanks. The distinctive landing gear, which rotated 90° to fold the main wheels flat into the thin trailing portion of the wing, resting atop the lower ends of the maingear struts when retracted, was a Boeing-patented design for which Curtiss had to pay royalties.

The prototype first flew on 6 May 1935, reaching 281 mph (452 km/h) at 10,000 ft (3,000 m) during early test flights. On 27 May 1935, the prototype was flown to Wright Field, Ohio, to compete in the USAAC fly-off for a new single-seat fighter, but the contest was delayed because the Seversky entry crashed on its way there. Curtiss took advantage of the delay to replace the unreliable engine with a Wright XR-1820-39 Cyclone producing 950 hp (710 kW) and to rework the fuselage, adding the distinctive scalloped rear windows to improve visibility. The new prototype was designated Model 75B with the R-1670 version retroactively designated Model 75D. The fly-off finally took place in April 1936. Unfortunately, the new engine failed to deliver its rated power and the aircraft only reached 285 mph (459 km/h).

Although the competing Seversky P-35 also underperformed and was more expensive, it was still declared the winner and awarded a contract for 77 aircraft. However, on 16 June 1936, Curtiss received an order from USAAC for three prototypes designated Y1P-36. The USAAC was concerned about political turmoil in Europe, and about Seversky's ability to deliver P-35s in a timely manner, and therefore wanted a backup fighter. The Y1P-36 (Model 75E) was powered by a 900 hp Pratt & Whitney R-1830-13 Twin Wasp engine, and the scalloped rear canopy was further enlarged. The new aircraft performed so well that it won the 1937 USAAC competition with an order for 210 P-36A fighters.

The aircraft's extremely low wing loading of just 23.9 lb/ft^{2} gave it outstanding turning performance, (Note: According to Czech ace František Peřina, the P-36 was "terrific. It was not as fast as the Messerschmitt, but it could outmaneuver any German aircraft. If one got on your tail, in one 360-degree turn, you were behind him." Compared to the Hawker Hurricane, Peřina said the Hurricane was "a good aircraft, but heavier than the P-36 and, with a higher wing loading, not as easy to handle as a P-36.") and its high power-to-weight ratio of 0.186 hp/lb gave superb climbing performance for the time. The single speed supercharger was a serious handicap at high altitudes. Compared to the later Allison-engined P-40, the P-36 shared the P-40's traits of excellent high-speed handling, roll rate that improved at high speed, and relatively light controls at high speed. However, it was underpowered, affecting its acceleration and top speed, and it did not accelerate in a dive as well as the P-40.

== Operational history ==
=== Argentina ===
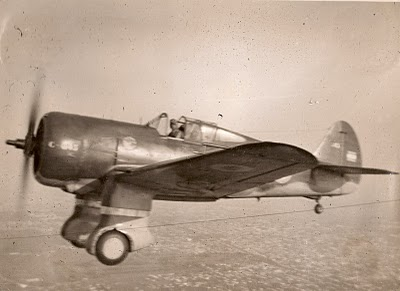
FMA Curtiss Hawk 75O

Argentina bought a number of the simplified, fixed landing gear Hawk 75Os, (intended for rough-field operations and ease of maintenance) and purchased a manufacturing license for the type; 30 were built and delivered by Curtiss, and 20 produced locally. These aircraft used the same engine, Wright Cyclone R-1820-G5 as the Martin 139WAA's and Northrop 8A-2s used by the Argentine Army Aviation at the time. Usually armed with one 11.35 mm (0.45 in) Madsen machine gun heavily modified for aircraft use and three 7.65 mm (0.30 in) Madsen light machine guns, there was provision for up to 10 30 lb (14 kg) bombs on underwing pylons. The last Argentinian Hawks remained in service until November 1954.

=== Brazil ===
In March 1942, 10 USAAC P-36As were transferred to Brazil.

=== British Commonwealth ===
RAF Mohawk IVs in India in January 1943

The Royal Air Force (RAF) also displayed interest in the aircraft. Comparison of a borrowed French Hawk 75A-2 with a Supermarine Spitfire Mk I revealed that the Hawk had several advantages over the early variant of the iconic British fighter. The Hawk was found to have lighter controls than the Spitfire at speeds over 300 mph (480 km/h), especially in diving attacks, and was easier to maneuver in a dogfight (thanks to the less sensitive elevator). The Hawk also had better all-around visibility and was easier to control on takeoff and landing. Not surprisingly, the Spitfire's superior acceleration and top speed ultimately gave it the advantage of being able to engage and leave combat at will.

Although the British decided not to purchase the aircraft, they soon came into possession of 229 Hawks by way of shipments diverted from occupied France and aircraft flown by escaping French pilots. The aircraft received the designations Mohawk I through IV, mirroring French Hawk 75A-1 through A-4, and were fitted with 0.303-cal. machine guns and conventional throttles (forward to increase power).

Although the Hawk was considered obsolete, a number saw service with the RAF and Royal Indian Air Force (RIAF) in India and Burma. In April 1941, the government of British India ordered 48 Cyclone-powered Mohawk IVz (Hawk 75A) for the RIAF, to be built by Hindustan Aircraft. The first such aircraft completed was test flown on 31 July 1942. Only four additional aircraft were completed before the project was abandoned. However, Chinese license production of the Hawk 75A-5 was moved to India, and these aircraft were also absorbed into the RAF/RIAF as Mohawk IVs. They were supplemented by 10 Hawk 75A-9s that were captured in Iran, during the Anglo-Soviet invasion of Iran of August 1941. A further 74 Mohawk IVs that had originally been ordered by France were shipped to India from the United Kingdom. The only RAF units to see combat in Mohawks were No. 5 Squadron RAF and No. 155 Squadron RAF, using the type mainly for bomber escort and ground attack. The type was retired by the RAF/RIAF in 1944.

The South African Air Force received 72 Mohawks. Its first Mohawks were delivered to East Africa in mid-1941, where they were used by 3 Squadron SAAF to support operations in the East African Campaign, taking part in the Battle of Gondar which ended the campaign, and helping to patrol the border with Vichy French held Djibouti. These Mohawks were then sent to South Africa, where, supplemented by fresh deliveries, they were used for training and for home defense.

=== China ===
The prototype of the Hawk 75H—a simplified version with fixed landing gear, like the 75O—was eventually sold to the Chinese Nationalist government who presented it to Claire L. Chennault for personal use. China also received two similar demonstrators, the Hawk 75Q. They also used a number of simplified Hawk 75Ms against the Japanese. On 11 January 1939, five Hawk 75Ms of the veteran CAF 25th Fighter Squadron led by commander Liu Yijun (劉依鈞) were flown to the new wartime capital of Chongqing in preparations for defense duties there; Liu Yijun and his four specially-trained Hawk 75 pilots all died in the crash of transport aircraft in the return flight. These Hawk 75Ms were intended for the newly established 16th and 18th Fighter Squadrons that were previously light attack-bomber squadrons, but did not supersede the increasingly obsolescent Polikarpov I-15 and I-16 that formed the backbone of most of China's fighter squadrons from 1938 to 1941. The Hawk 75A-5 was built under license in China, but production was later moved to India, and these aircraft were absorbed into the RAF as the Mohawk IV.

=== Finland ===
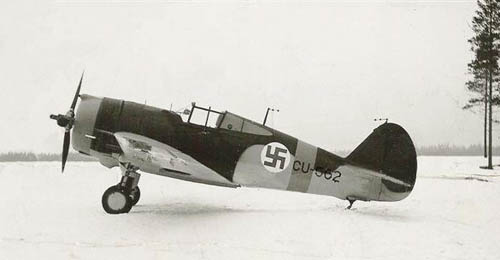
Curtiss Hawk 75A-3 in Finnish service

Hawk 75s captured by German forces in Norway and France were on-sold to Finland. Curtiss had sold 13 aircraft to Norway, and 31 more were captured around the time of the fall of France. These were sold to Finland in October 1940. In total, 44 captured aircraft of five subtypes were transferred to Finland, in three tranches, between 23 June 1941 and 5 January 1944. The aircraft were given serial codes CU-501 to CU-507 (A-4 submodel with Cyclone) and CU-551 to CU-587 (all other submodels with Twin Wasp).

In Finnish service, the Hawk was well-liked, affectionately called Sussu ("Sweetheart"). The Finnish Air Force enjoyed success with the type, credited with 190 1/3 kills by 58 pilots, between 16 July 1941 and 27 July 1944, for the loss of 15 of their own. Finnish Hawk pilots included the type's highest-scoring ace, Altto Kalevi "Kale" Tervo, with between 14 1/4 and 15 3/4 victories in the type; another ace, Kyösti "Kössi" Karhila, scored 12 1/4 or 13 1/4 of his 32 1/4 victories in the Hawk.

The Finnish Hawks were initially armed with either four or six 7.5mm machine guns. While sufficient during the early phase of the Continuation War, the increasing speeds and armor of Soviet aircraft soon showed this armament was not powerful enough. From 1942, the State Aircraft Factory replaced the fuselage machine guns with either one or two .50 in (12.7 mm) Colt or Browning FN machine guns and installed two or four .303 in (7.7 mm) Browning machine guns in each wing. The 12.7mm Berezin UB or LKk/42 heavy machine guns were also used. The installation of heavier armament did not change the very good flying characteristics of the fighter, and the armament was much more effective against Soviet aircraft. The Finnish Hawks were also equipped with Revi 3D or C/12D gunsight.

Surviving Finnish aircraft remained in service with the FAF aviation units HLeLv 13, HLeLv 11 and LeSK until 30 August 1948, when the last operational Finnish Hawks were put into storage. In 1953, the stored aircraft were scrapped.

=== France ===
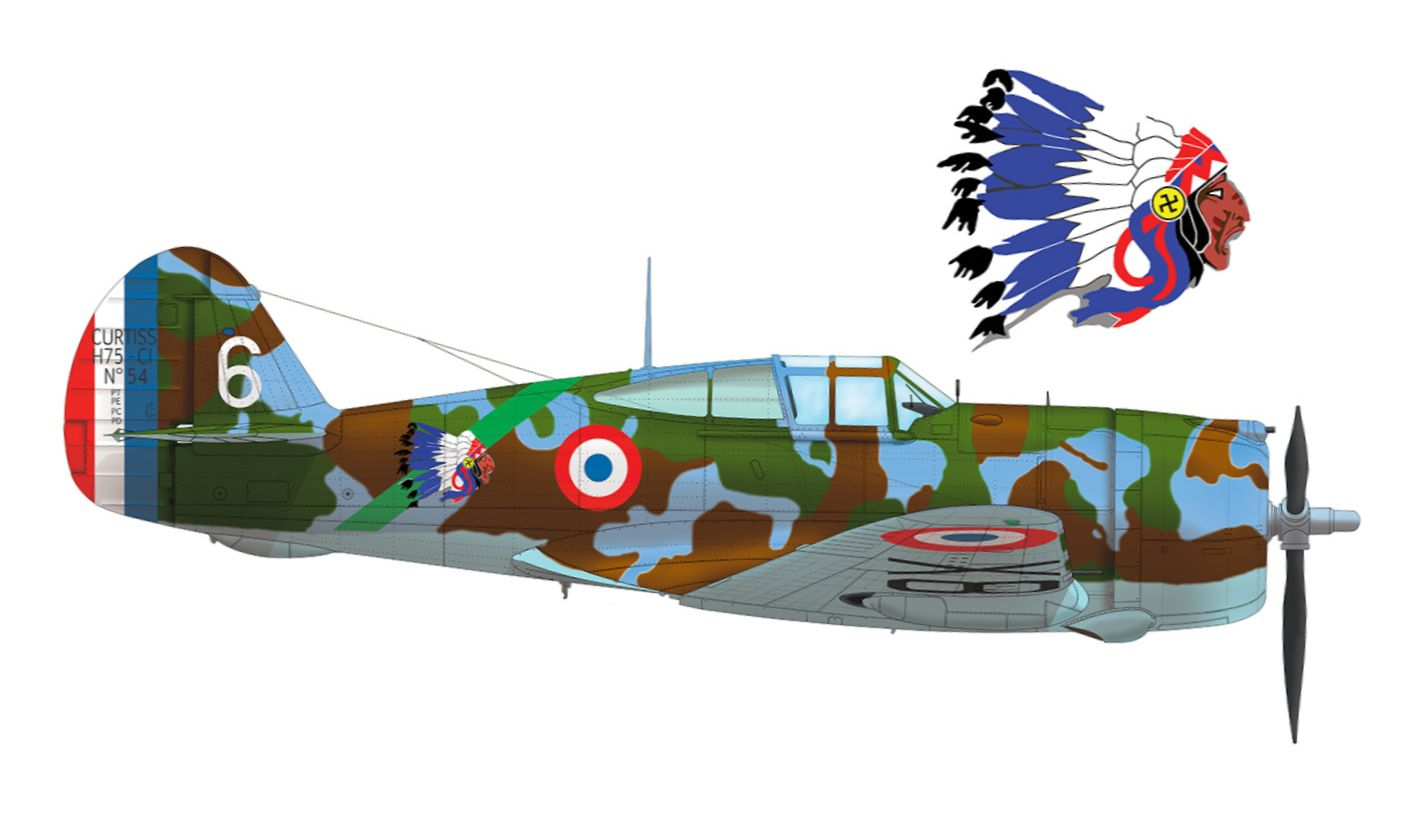
Curtiss H75A-1 of the 3rd flight of Groupe de Chasse II/5 French Air Force, June 1940

Even before the P-36A entered production, the French Air Force entered negotiations with Curtiss for delivery of 300 aircraft. The negotiating process ended up being very drawn-out because the cost of the Curtiss fighters was double that of the French Morane-Saulnier M.S.406 and Bloch MB.150, and the delivery schedule was deemed too slow. Since the USAAC was unhappy with the rate of domestic deliveries and believed that export aircraft would slow things down even more, it actively opposed the sale. Eventually, it took direct intervention from U.S. President Franklin Roosevelt to give the French test pilot Michel Detroyat a chance to fly the Y1P-36.

Detroyat's enthusiasm, problems with the MB.150, and the pressure of continuing German rearmament finally forced France to purchase 100 aircraft and 173 engines. The first Hawk 75A-1 (or H75A-1 n°1) arrived in France in December 1938 and began entering service in March 1939. A few months later, this aircraft was part of Groupe de Chasse II/5 "La Fayette" (heir of the Escadrille Lafayette that fought in France during World War I), wearing the famous Sioux Head on its fuselage side. After the first few examples, aircraft were delivered in pieces and assembled in France by the Société Nationale de Constructions Aéronautiques du Centre.

Officially designated as the Curtiss H75-C1 (the "Hawk" name was not used in France), the aircraft were powered by Pratt & Whitney R-1830-SC-G engines of 900 hp and had instruments calibrated for the metric system, a seat for French dorsal parachutes, a French-style throttle which operated in reverse from U.S. and British aircraft (full throttle was to the rear rather than to the front) and armament of four (later models had six with two firing through the prop and four in the wings) 7.5 mm FN-Browning machine guns, aimed with a French-supplied Baille-Lemaire gun sight. The aircraft evolved through several modifications, the most significant being the installation of the Wright R-1820 Cyclone engine. The H75-C1 variant saw little operational use due to its late delivery and reliability problems with the Wright radial engine. A total of 316 H75s were delivered to France before the German occupation.

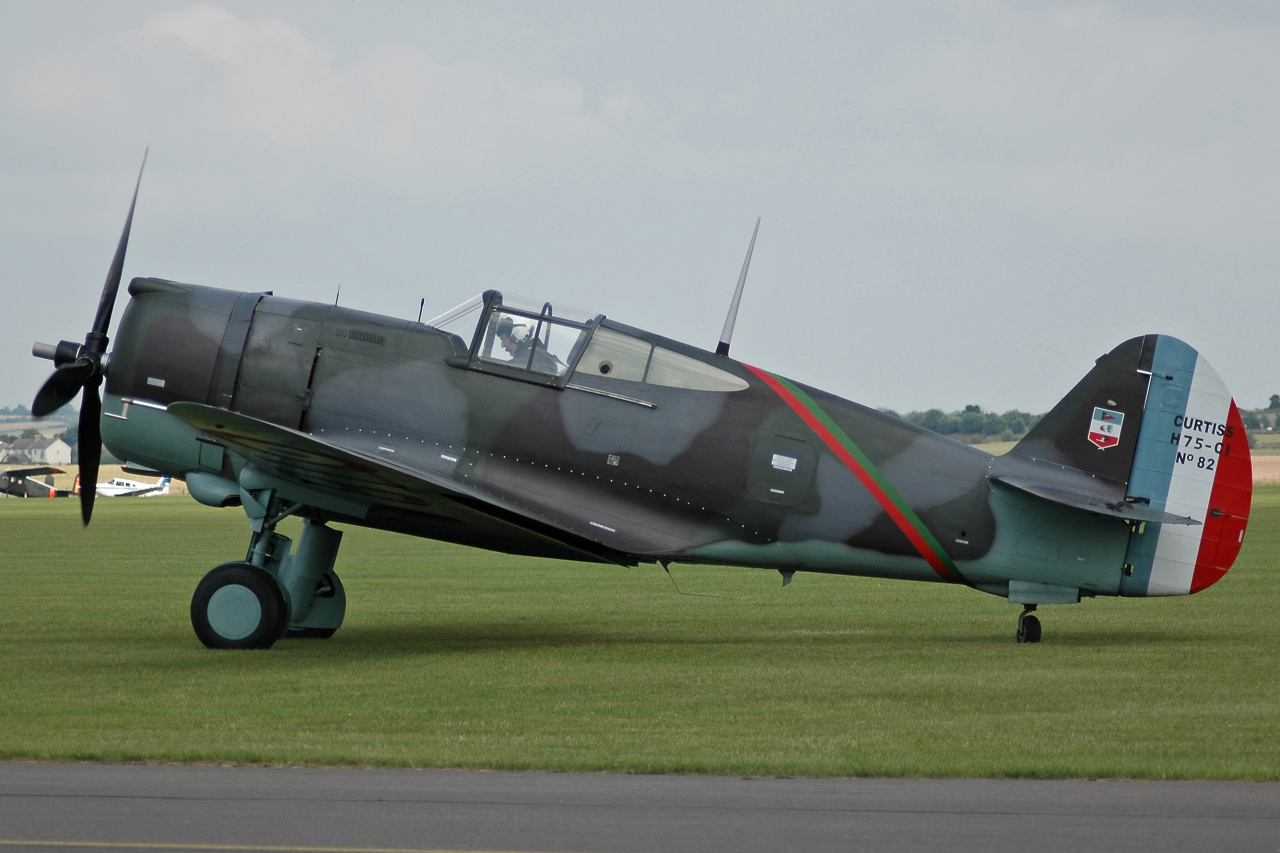
Curtiss H75C-1

On 20 September, Sergeant André-Armand Legrand, pilot of the H75A-1 n°1 in the Groupe de Chasse II/5 "La Fayette" was credited with the first Allied air victory of the Western Front of World War II, shooting down a Messerschmitt Bf 109E of the Luftwaffe 3/JG 53, over Überherrn. During 1939–1940, French H75 pilots claimed 230 air-to-air kills (of a total of 1,009 air-to-air kills by the French Air Force during 1939–1940) and 81 probable victories in H75s against only 29 aircraft lost in aerial combat. While making up only 12.6 per cent of the French Air Force single-seater fighter force, the H75 accounted for almost a third of the air-to-air kills during the 1940 Battle of France.

Of the 11 French aces of the early part of the war, seven flew H75s. The leading ace of the time was Lieutenant Edmond Marin la Meslée with 15 confirmed and five probable victories in the type. H75-equipped squadrons were evacuated to French North Africa before the Armistice to avoid capture by the Germans. While under the Vichy government, these units clashed with British aircraft during the Battle of Mers El-Kebir and the Battle of Dakar. During Operation Torch in North Africa, French H75s fought against U.S. Navy F4F Wildcats, losing 15 aircraft while shooting down seven American aircraft. From late 1942, the Allies started re-equipping the formerly Vichy-controlled French H75 units with P-40s and P-39s; despite this they still saw limited service with the Free French Air Forces.

=== Nazi Germany ===
In mid-1940, the Luftwaffe experienced a shortage of replacement Bf 109s, following losses in the French campaign and the early stages of the Battle of Britain. Curtiss H75s, captured from French stocks, were used as a stopgap; between August and October 1940, one staffel, 7/JG 77, stationed in Brittany, reportedly flew a total of 12 H75s. Some of these aircraft were apparently used subsequently as advanced fighter trainers, by Jagdfliegerschule 4, near Nuremberg.

=== Iran ===
The Hawk 75A-9 variant was also ordered by the Imperial State of Iran (previously Persia). In or before mid-1941, 10 of these aircraft arrived in Iran, partly-assembled and in crates. They had not been assembled by the time of the Allied invasion of Iran. Seized by Commonwealth forces, these Hawk 75s were shipped to India, where they were assembled and used by the RAF/RIAF, as the Mohawk Mk. IV.

=== Dutch East Indies ===
In October 1939, the Netherlands ordered 24 Hawk 75A-7s for their colonies of the Dutch East Indies (Oost Indië). These planes were powered by 1,200 hp Cyclones. Factory armament was one .50 inch and one .303 inch machine gun in the cowl with two .303 machine guns in the wings. After delivery, the .50 weapons were replaced to standardize parts and ammunition. The plane could carry six 23 kg (51 lb) bombs. The fighters were shipped in 1940 and almost rerouted to the Netherlands when Germany invaded. But as the mainland surrendered, the aircraft continued to the colonies where they were used extensively against the Japanese attack on the Far Eastern part of the kingdom. By that time, the aircraft had flown so many hours that the engines were showing serious wear and tear.

Most Dutch Hawks were assigned to the 1ste JachtVliegAfdeling - VliegtuigGroep IV (1ste JaVA - 1-VlG IV; "1st Fighter Squadron - Flying Group IV") of the Royal Netherlands East Indies Army Air Force (ML-KNIL), although some flew with 1-VlG V. These aircraft saw action over Malacca, Sumatra and Java, successfully bombing the railroad and intercepting bombers and participated in the extensive dogfights over Soerabaja, where USAAF, RAF and ML aircraft fought Japanese bombers and fighters together.

=== Norway ===
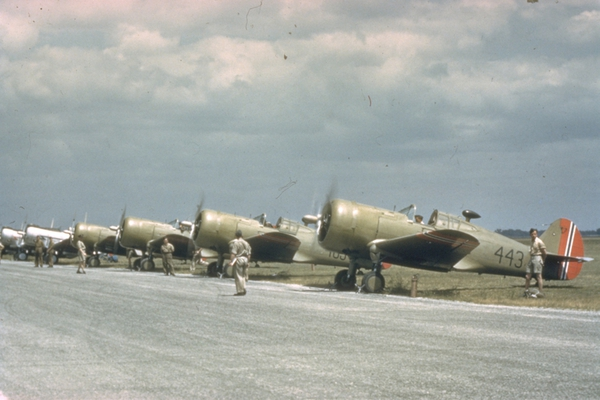
Hawk 75s at Little Norway in 1942

Norway ordered 24 Twin Wasp-powered Hawk 75A-6s, of which 19 were delivered and seven assembled at the time of the German invasion. None of the aircraft were combat-ready. The disassembled aircraft were disabled by a single customs employee who smashed the instruments and cut all the wires he could reach. Thirteen Norwegian Hawks captured by the Germans were part of the first batch of 29 P-36s sent to Finland. Norway also ordered 36 Cyclone-powered Hawk 75A-8s. Most of this batch (a total of 30) were delivered as advanced trainers to "Little Norway" near Toronto, Ontario, Canada, a Norwegian training base established by the London-based government-in-exile. Still later, they were resold to the U.S. and redesignated the P-36G model.

=== Peru ===
In 1943, the U.S. sent 28 Hawks to Peru under the Lend-Lease agreement. These were ex-Norwegian P-36Gs that had served in Canada.

=== Portugal ===
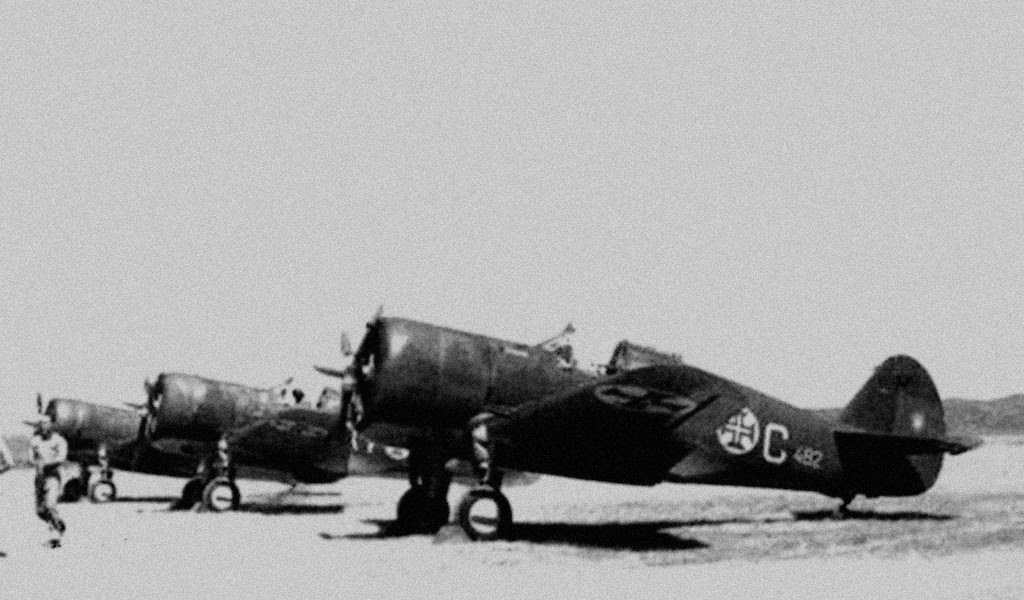
Curtiss Hawk 75A-4 in Azores

Portugal was officially neutral during World War II, although the Allies were allowed to use or establish ports and airfields on various Portuguese territories. One result of these friendly relations was the transfer by the British government of 12 Hawk 75A variants to the Portuguese Air Force, or Força Aérea Portuguesa (FAP), which assigned them to air defense duties in the Azores.

=== Thailand ===
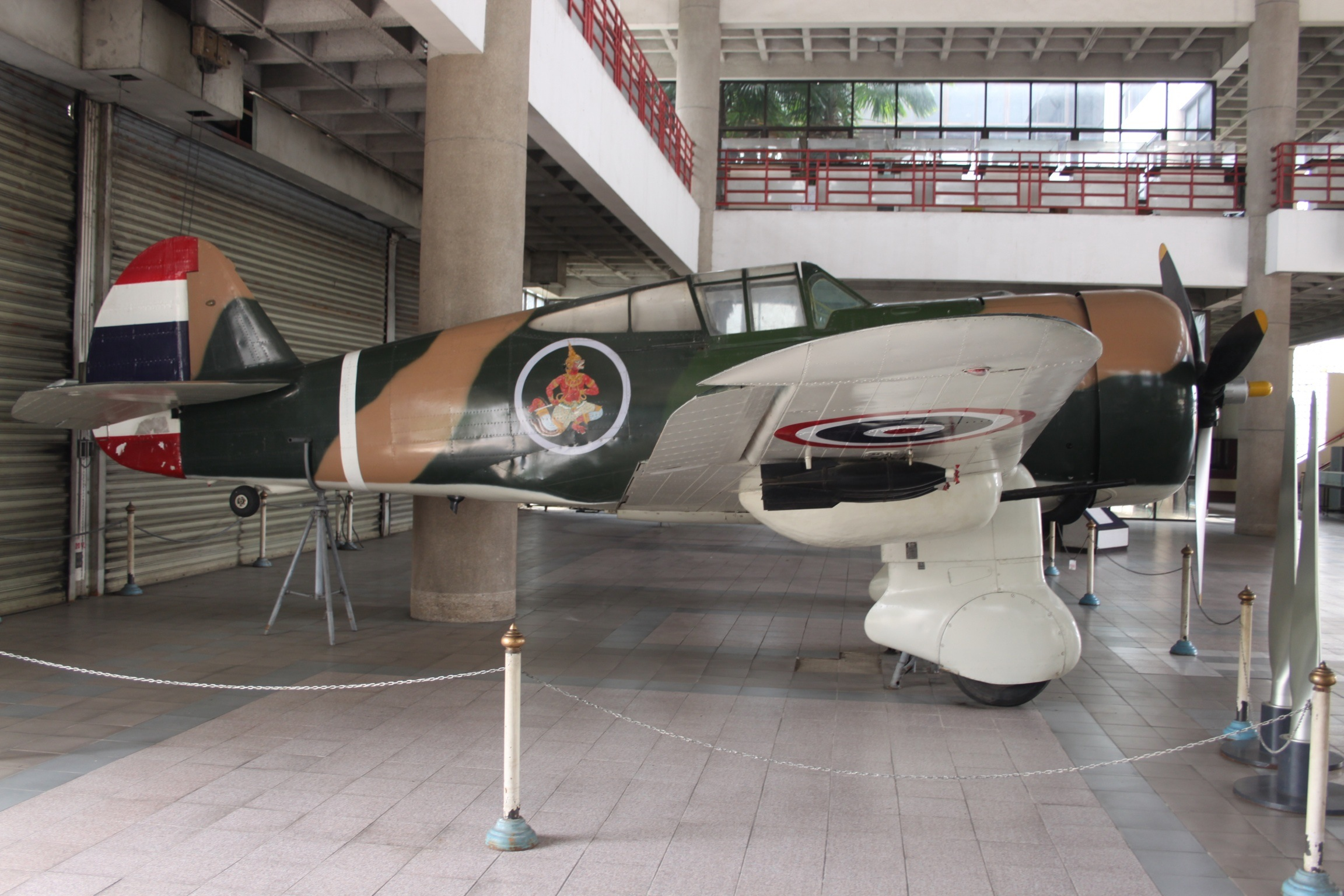
Curtiss Hawk 75N

A few Hawk 75Ns were used by Thailand during the French-Thai War. They also fought at the Battle of Prachuab Khirikhan against Japanese forces during the Japanese Invasion of Thailand. On 28 January 1941, the Royal Thai Air Force (RTAF) dispatched nine Ki-30 Nagoyas, escorted by three Hawk 75s, to bomb Pailin and Sisophon in French Indochina. Thailand was perhaps the only country operating both Japanese and American aircraft just before World War II.

=== United States ===
The first production P-36As were delivered to the 20th Pursuit Group at Barksdale Field in Louisiana in April 1938. The aircraft's service history was marred by numerous teething problems with the engine exhaust, skin buckling over landing gear, and weak points in the airframe, severely restricting the performance envelope. By the time these issues were resolved, the P-36 was considered obsolete and was relegated to training units and overseas detachments at Albrook Field in the Panama Canal Zone, Elmendorf Field in Alaska, and Wheeler Field in Hawaii.

The P-36s had been delivered to Hawaii in February 1941 by being loaded on the aircraft carrier USS Enterprise in California, then in a first for the USAAC, flown off the carrier's deck by Army Air Corps pilots when the Enterprise neared the coast of Hawaii. This saved considerable time over the traditional shipping method of having the fighters first disassembled, crated and then loaded by crane in the hold of a freighter, then unloaded and reassembled in Hawaii.

The only combat by U.S.-operated P-36s took place during the Japanese attack on Pearl Harbor. Five of the 39 P-36A Hawks at Pearl Harbor were able to take off during the attack and were credited with shooting down two Japanese Mitsubishi A6M2 Zeros for the loss of one P-36, thereby scoring U.S. aerial victories that were among the first of the Second World War.

== Variants ==
Model 75A
Company-owned demonstrator aircraft flown with several engine fits
Model 75B
Prototype with Wright R-1820 radial engine
Model 75D
First prototype, Wright Whirlwind R-1670 radial
Model 75H
Internal company designation for a simplified export version with fixed landing gear, two slightly differing aircraft built, first sold to China, second to Argentina
Model 75I
Company designation for the P-37.
Model 75J
Company-owned 75A temporarily fitted with an external supercharger
Model 75K
Unbuilt version, intended to use the Pratt & Whitney R-2180-A Twin Hornet radial.
Model 75P
Production P-36A (serial 38-010) fitted with Allison V-1710 liquid-cooled engine, prototype for Curtiss P-40
Model 75R
Company-owned 75A temporarily fitted with R-1830-SC2-G with turbo-supercharger, attained 330 mph (530 km/h) but proved complex and unreliable
Model 75S
Company designation for the P-42
Y1P-36 (Model 75E)
USAAC prototype, Pratt & Whitney R-1830
P-36A (Model 75L)
USAAC version
P-36B
Production P-36A fitted with an R-1830-25 producing 1,100 hp (820 kW), reached 313 mph (504 km/h), returned to original P-36A configuration
P-36C
An additional 0.30 in machine gun installed in each wing with external ammunition boxes under the wings, R-1830-17 of 1,200 hp (890 kW); last 30 production aircraft were completed as P-36Cs
XP-36D
Production P-36A modified with two .50 in (12.7 mm) machine guns in the nose and four 0.30 in machine guns in the wings
XP-36E
Production P-36A armed with four 0.30 in machine guns in the wings, retained standard fuselage guns
XP-36F
Production P-36A fitted with two 23 mm (0.91 in) Madsen autocannons under the wings, reverted to P-36A because guns imposed an unacceptable performance penalty with top speed of only 265 mph (426 km/h).
P-36G
Hawk 75A-8 used by Norway for training in Canada; later delivered to Peru. R-1820-G205A of 1,200 hp.
Hawk 75A-1
First production batch for France, four 7.5 mm (0.295 in) machine guns, R-1830-SC-G of 900 hp (670 kW) 100 built
Hawk 75A-2
Second production batch for France, either R-1830-SC-G or 1,050 hp (780 kW) R-1830-SC3-G, six 7.5 mm machine guns; 100 built
Hawk 75A-3
Third production batch for France, similar to Hawk 75A-2; 135 built (133 delivered).
Hawk 75A-4
Last production batch for France, Hawk 75A-2 with Wright R-1820-G205A Cyclone radial with 1,200 hp: 285 built, 81 delivered to France; others to Great Britain as Mohawk IV
Hawk 75A-5
Similar to Hawk 75A-4. Built under license in China (production was later moved to India), absorbed into RAF as Mohawk IV
Hawk 75A-6
Version for Norway; aircraft captured during the German invasion were eventually sold to Finland.
Hawk 75A-7
Version for Netherlands East Indies: 1,200 hp Cyclone, one .5 in (12.7 mm) and one .303 in (7.7 mm) in cowl and two .303 in (7.7 mm) in wings; later four .303 in (7.7 mm) (two in nose, one in each wing) and six 50 lb (23 kg) bombs.
Hawk 75A-8
Export version for Norway. Later renamed P-36G.
Hawk 75A-9
10 aircraft delivered to Persia, captured still in crates and used by RAF in India as Mohawk IVs
Hawk 75M
Simplified version with fixed landing gear and Wright R-1820 Cyclone for China, built by Curtiss and Central Aircraft Manufacturing Company in China
Hawk 75N
Simplified version for Siam (Thailand) with non-retractable landing gear and wheel pants. Locally designated B.Kh.11 (Thai: บ.ข.๑๑).
Hawk 75O
Simplified version for Argentina, 30 built and delivered by Curtiss with additional 200 to be built under license locally by Fabrica Militar de Aviones, only 20 were completed.
Hawk 75Q
Two more simplified demonstrators for China. At least one is reputed to have been given an armament similar to that of the XP-36F and to have engaged in combat over Shanghai during the Japanese attacks in September 1937, reportedly shooting down several bombers before being brought down with the loss of the American pilot.
XP-37
Allison V-1710 inline, cockpit moved to the rear of the fuselage
YP-37
Service test version of XP-37, 13 built
XP-40
Allison V-1710 inline, prototype of the Curtiss P-40 Warhawk, one converted from a P-36A
XP-42
Test bed for streamlining cowlings around air-cooled engines

== Operators ==
Argentina

- Argentine Air Force

Brazil

- Brazilian Air Force

China

- Republic of China Air Force

Finland

- Finnish Air Force

France

- Armée de l'air (AdlA)

Germany

- Luftwaffe (7/JG 77, August–October 1940; ex-AdlA)

(British Raj) Indian Empire

- Royal Indian Air Force

Netherlands

- Royal Netherlands East Indies Army Air Force

Portugal

- Portuguese Air Force

Thailand

- Royal Thai Air Force

United Kingdom

- Royal Air Force

South Africa

- South African Air Force

United States

- United States Army Air Corps
- United States Army Air Forces

== Surviving aircraft ==
New Zealand

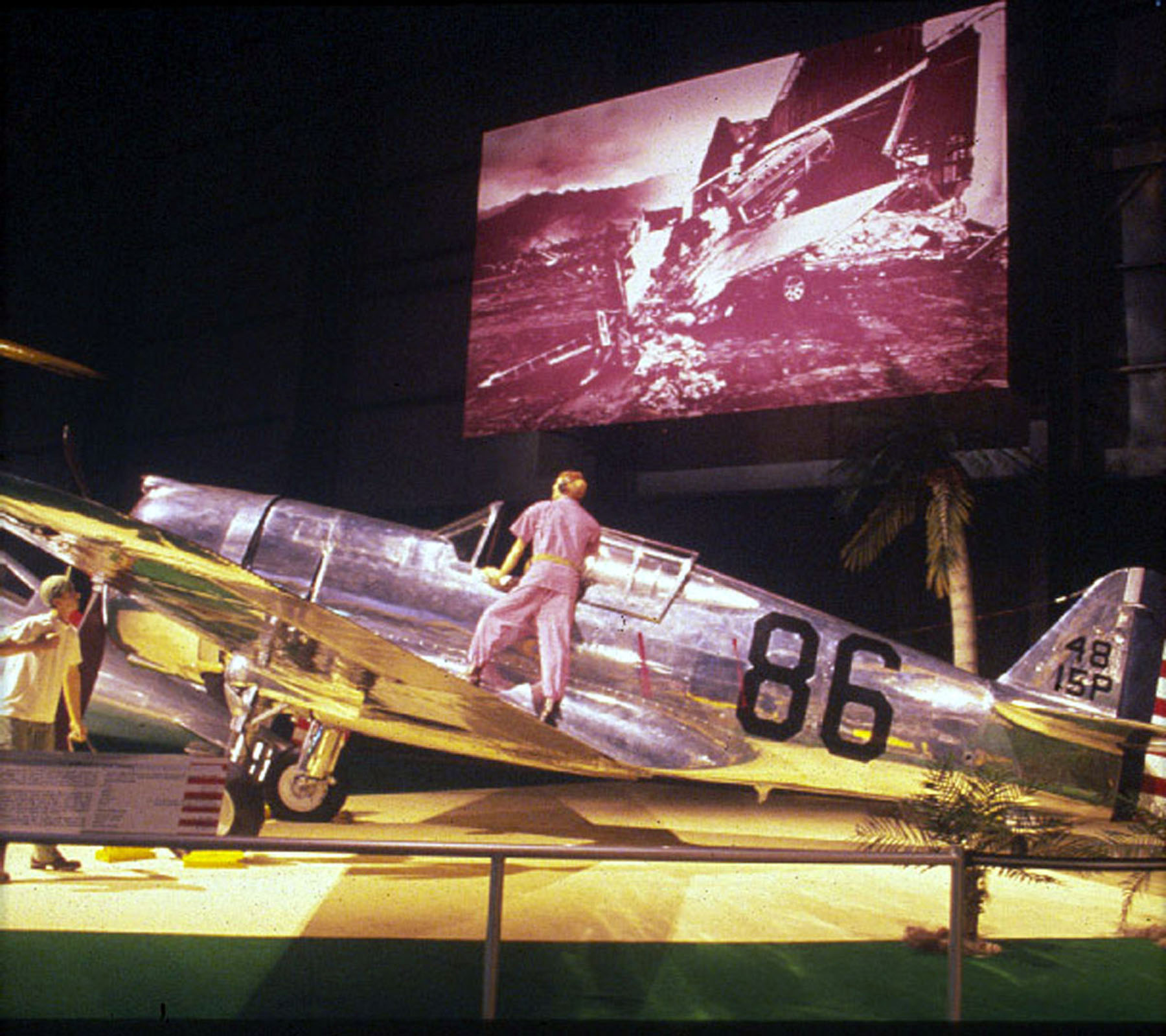
P-36A at National Museum of the United States Air Force, with a mannequin representing Phil Rasmussen

- CU-554 – Hawk 75A-6 under restoration to airworthy condition at Ardmore Airport, New Zealand for Jerry Yagen's Military Aviation Museum. Formerly located at Omaka Aerodrome in Blenheim, New Zealand.

Thailand

- Unknown ID – Hawk 75N on static display in the Royal Thai Air Force Museum in Bangkok.

United Kingdom

- N°82 – Hawk 75A-1 airworthy at The Fighter Collection in Duxford, Cambridgeshire. It was one of the first 100 delivered to the French in April 1939. It wears French camouflage and is painted in markings from two different periods during its service on either side of the fuselage.

United States

- 38-001 – P-36A on static display at the National Museum of the United States Air Force in Dayton, Ohio. It is the first P-36A to be delivered to the Air Corps and is displayed in the markings of the P-36A flown by Lt Phil Rasmussen during the Japanese attack on Pearl Harbor.
- 38-210 – P-36C airworthy with Walter Bowe, Sonoma, California. It was the last P-36C built and was restored in 2015 in Chino, California, before being shipped to England and operated by The Fighter Collection in Duxford, Cambridgeshire. It is painted in US Army Air Corps silver and yellow.

== Specifications (P-36A) ==
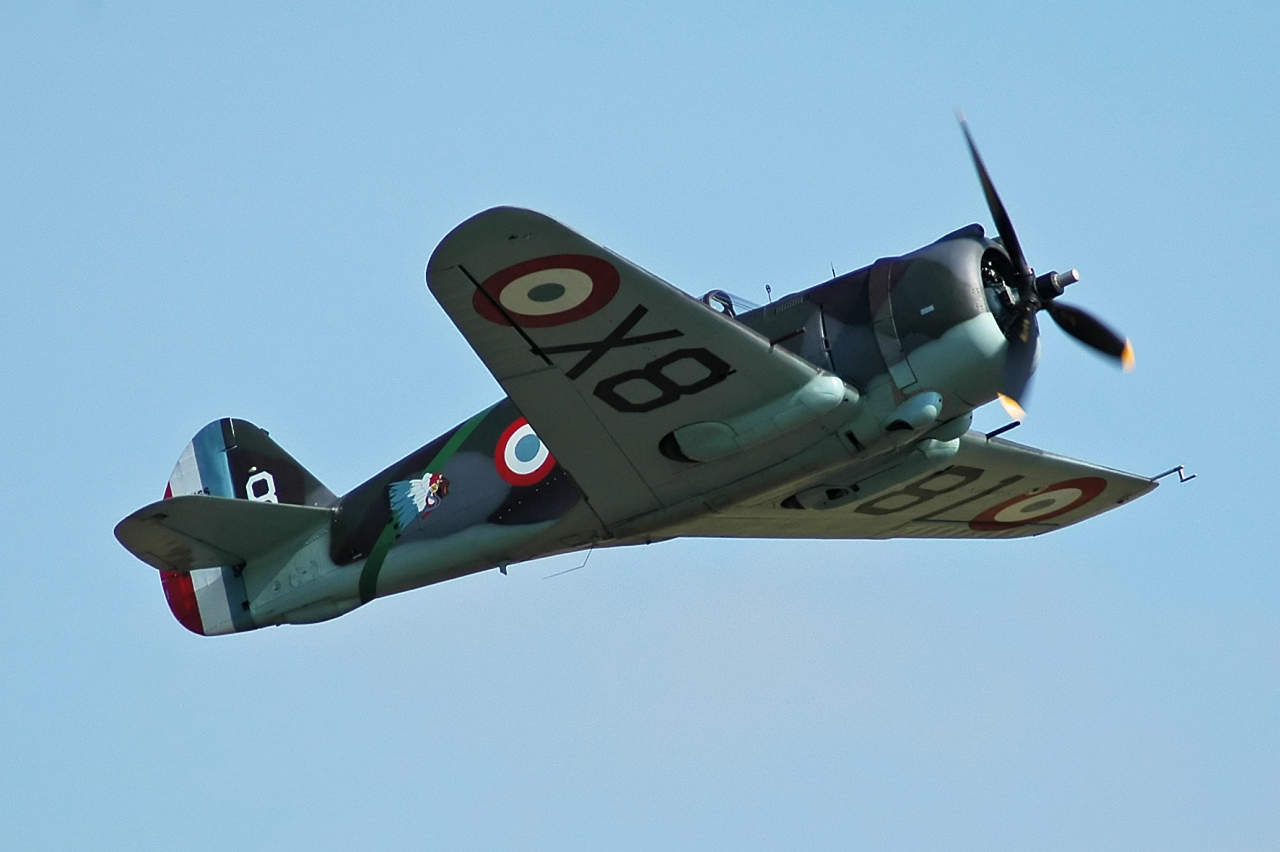
H75C-1 at Duxford, United Kingdom

Data from Curtiss Fighter Aircraft: A Photographic History 1917–1948

General characteristics

- Crew: One
- Length: 28 ft 6 in (8.69 m)
- Wingspan: 37 ft 4 in (11.38 m)
- Height: 8 ft 5 in (2.57 m)
- Wing area: 235.94 sq ft (21.920 m^{2})
- Airfoil: root: NACA 2215; tip: NACA 2209
- Empty weight: 4,567 lb (2,072 kg)
- Gross weight: 5,650 lb (2,563 kg)
- Max takeoff weight: 6,010 lb (2,726 kg)
- Powerplant: 1 × Pratt & Whitney R-1830-17 Twin Wasp 14-cylinder air-cooled radial piston engine, 1,050 hp (780 kW)
- Propellers: 3-bladed constant-speed propeller

Performance

- Maximum speed: 313 mph (504 km/h, 272 kn)
- Cruise speed: 270 mph (430 km/h, 230 kn)
- Range: 625 mi (1,006 km, 543 nmi) at 270 mph (230 kn; 430 km/h)

860 mi (750 nmi; 1,380 km) at 200 mph (170 kn; 320 km/h)

- Service ceiling: 32,700 ft (10,000 m)
- Rate of climb: 3,400 ft/min (17 m/s)
- Wing loading: 23.9 lb/sq ft (117 kg/m^{2})
- Power/mass: 0.186 hp/lb (0.306 kW/kg)

Armament

- Guns: 1 × 0.30 in (7.62 mm) M1919 Browning machine gun
  - 1 × 0.50 in (12.70 mm) M2 Browning machine gun (Note: later production variants had two .50 MGs synchronized with the propeller mounted in the engine cowl and two or four .30 MGs mounted in the wings just outside the propeller arc)
- Bombs: some later fitted with a hardpoint under each wing that could carry a bomb of up to 100 lb (45 kg) or a light bomb rack for three 50 lb (23 kg), five 20 lb (9.1 kg) or 30 lb (14 kg) bombs

== See also ==
Related development

- Curtiss YP-37
- Curtiss P-40 Warhawk
- Curtiss XP-42
- Curtiss XP-46
- Curtiss P-60

Aircraft of comparable role, configuration, and era

- CAC Boomerang
- Polikarpov I-180
- PZL.50 Jastrząb
- Bloch MB.150
- Fiat G.50
- Fokker D.XXI
- Hawker Hurricane
- IAR 80
- Macchi MC.200
- Mitsubishi A6M Zero
- Nakajima Ki-43
- Reggiane Re.2000
- Seversky P-35

Related lists

- List of aircraft of World War II
- List of aircraft of the United States during World War II
- List of aircraft of the French Air Force during World War II
- List of aircraft of the United Kingdom in World War II
