= Curtiss XP-42 =

American Experimental Fighter Aircraft

XP-42
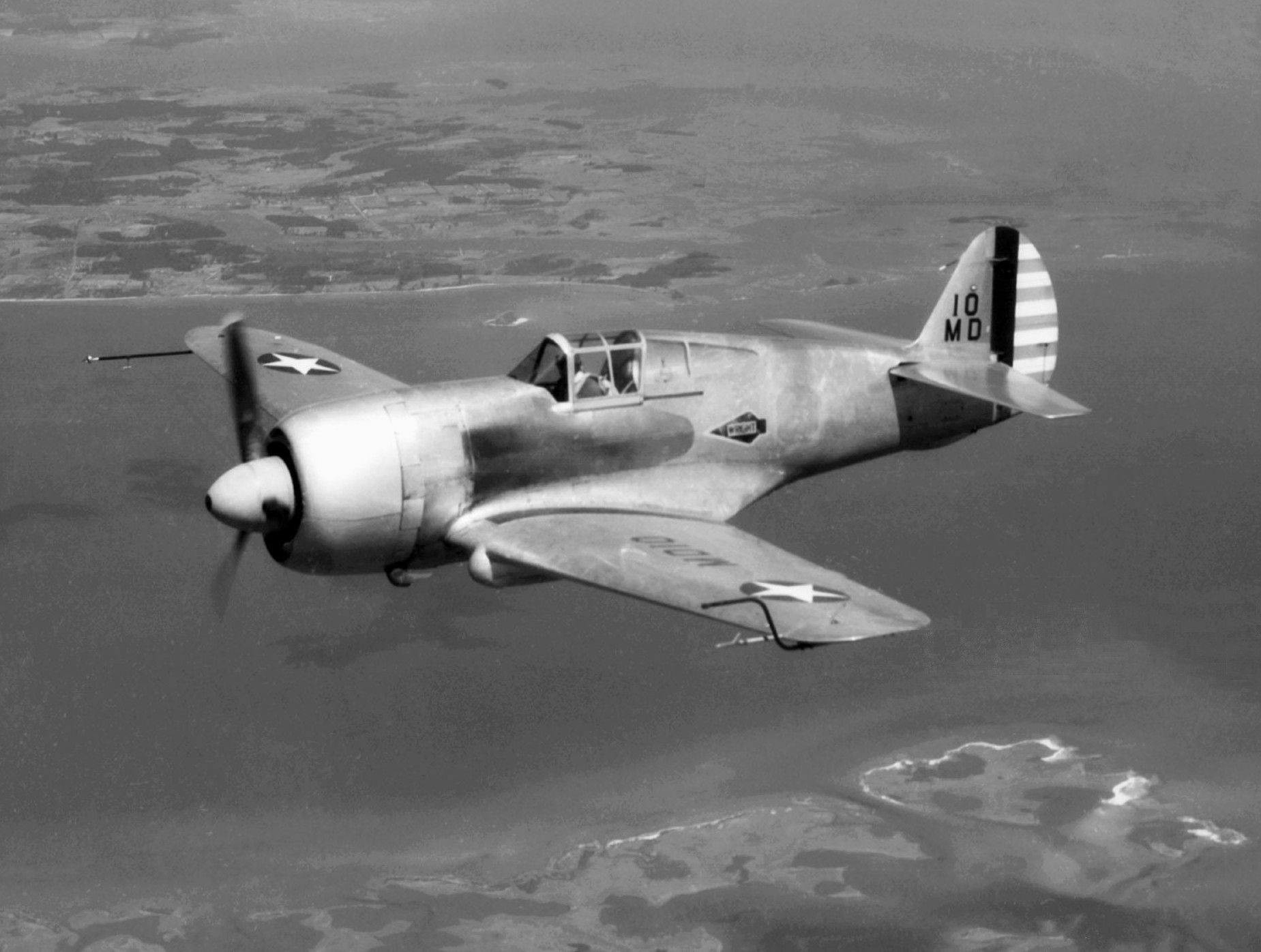
- Curtiss XP-42 in its final configuration, 1945

General information
- Type: Engine cooling research
- National origin: United States
- Manufacturer: Curtiss-Wright
- Number built: 1

History
- First flight: March 1939
- Developed from: Curtiss P-36

The Curtiss XP-42 was an experimental fighter built by Curtiss Aircraft in the late 1930s to research engine cooling and improving the performance of the Curtiss P-36 Hawk.

== Design and development ==
The fourth production P-36 (serial 38-004) became a development platform for a direct successor, designated XP-42 by the USAAC. The XP-42 was powered by a Pratt & Whitney R-1830 "Twin Wasp" engine fitted with a longer, streamlined cowling and a large propeller spinner. These features attempted to improve the aerodynamics of the air-cooled radial engine.

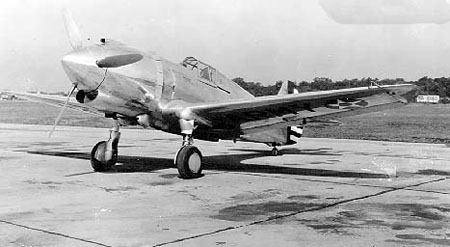
Curtiss XP-42 in its initial configuration, 1939

When the XP-42 first flew in March 1939, it proved to be faster than the P-36. However, the P-40 was faster still and the new nose cowling caused engine cooling problems that proved to be unresolvable, despite at least 12 sets of modifications, which ultimately resulted in a shorter and less streamlined cowling closely resembling the original P-36 Hawk. The XP-42 project was canceled. However, the XP-42 prototype was retained as a test-bed and was later fitted with an all-moving tail (stabilator), for research purposes. This aircraft was scrapped on July 15, 1947.

== Specifications (XP-42) ==
Data from Curtiss aircraft, 1907-1947

General characteristics

- Crew: 1
- Length: 28 ft 6 in (8.69 m)
- Wingspan: 37 ft 3.5 in (11.367 m)
- Height: 11 ft 1 in (3.38 m) top of propeller disc
- Wing area: 235.9 sq ft (21.92 m^{2})
- Airfoil: root: NACA 2215; tip: NACA 2209
- Empty weight: 4,818 lb (2,185 kg)
- Gross weight: 5,650 lb (2,563 kg)
- Max takeoff weight: 6,260 lb (2,839 kg)
- Powerplant: 1 × Pratt & Whitney R-1830-31 14-cylinder air-cooled radial piston engine, 1,050 hp (780 kW)
- Propellers: 3-bladed constant-speed propeller

Performance

- Maximum speed: 315 mph (507 km/h, 274 kn) at 15,000 ft (4,600 m)
- Cruise speed: 270 mph (430 km/h, 230 kn)
- Range: 730 mi (1,170 km, 630 nmi)

Armament

- Guns: provision for 1 × 0.30 in (7.6 mm) M1919 Browning machine gun and 1 × 0.50 in (13 mm) M2 Browning machine gun, but not fitted

== See also ==
Related development

- Curtiss P-36 Hawk
- Curtiss YP-37
- Curtiss P-40 Warhawk
- Curtiss XP-46
- Curtiss P-60
