= Curtiss YP-37 =

Experimental fighter aircraft

YP-37
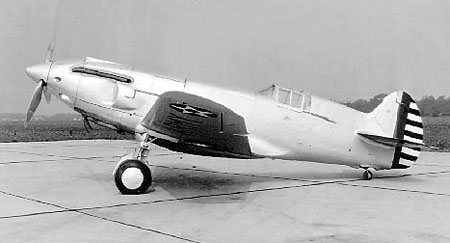
- Curtiss YP-37

General information
- Type: Fighter
- National origin: United States
- Manufacturer: Curtiss-Wright Corporation
- Status: Canceled
- Primary user: United States Army Air Corps
- Number built: 14

History
- Introduction date: 1939 (YP-37)
- First flight: April 1937 (XP-37)
- Developed from: Curtiss P-36 Hawk

The Curtiss YP-37 was an American fighter aircraft developed by Curtiss-Wright in the late 1930s for the United States Army Air Corps (USAAC). A derivative of the Curtiss P-36 Hawk, the YP-37 was designed to improve performance by replacing the P-36's radial engine with a turbo-supercharged, liquid-cooled Allison V-1710 inline engine, resulting in a lengthened fuselage and a rearward-shifted cockpit. Although it demonstrated promising speed, the aircraft suffered from unreliable turbo-superchargers and poor visibility, leading to its cancellation after 14 units were built. The project was abandoned in favor of the more practical Curtiss P-40 Warhawk.

== Design and development ==
In early 1937, recognizing the P-36 Hawk's inferiority to emerging European fighters like the Supermarine Spitfire and Messerschmitt Bf 109, the USAAC sought to enhance its fighter capabilities. Curtiss was tasked with adapting a P-36 airframe to use a turbo-supercharged Allison V-1710-11 engine, producing 1,150 hp (860 kW). The prototype Hawk was fitted with a turbo-supercharged 1,150 hp (860 kW) Allison V-1710-11 as the XP-37 (company designation Model 75I). The cockpit was moved back towards the tail to make room for the massive turbo-superchargers, and the engine was cooled by two radiators on either side of the nose. It was armed with one 0.30 in (7.62 mm) M1919 Browning machine gun and one 0.50 in (12.70 mm) M2 Browning machine gun in the nose. The XP-37 first flew in April 1937, achieving a top speed of 340 mph (547 km/h), but its turbo-supercharger was prone to failure, and visibility was severely limited.

Intrigued by the speed potential, the USAAC ordered 13 service-test YP-37 aircraft in 1938 for $531,305.12. These featured an improved V-1710-21 engine and a further extended nose to adjust balance. First flown in June 1939, the YP-37 retained the same armament but failed to resolve the reliability and visibility issues. By 1940, the USAAC canceled the project, shifting focus to the P-40 Warhawk, which used a simpler Allison engine configuration.

== Variants ==
XP-37
One prototype with a V-1710-11 engine.
YP-37
13 service-test aircraft with V-1710-21 engines and an extended fuselage.

== Specifications (YP-37) ==
Data from Curtiss aircraft 1907–1947, Baugher: Curtiss XP-37

General characteristics

- Crew: 1
- Length: 32 ft 11.5 in (10.046 m)
- Wingspan: 37 ft 3.5 in (11.367 m)
- Height: 11 ft 1 in (3.38 m)
- Wing area: 236 sq ft (21.9 m^{2})
- Airfoil: root: NACA 2215; tip: NACA 2209
- Empty weight: 5,592 lb (2,536 kg)
- Gross weight: 6,700 lb (3,039 kg)
- Powerplant: 1 × Allison V-1710-21 V-12 liquid-cooled piston engine, 1,000 hp (750 kW)
- Propellers: 3-bladed Curtiss electric constant-speed propeller

Performance

- Maximum speed: 340 mph (550 km/h, 300 kn) at 10,000 ft (3,000 m)

331 mph (288 kn; 533 km/h) at 20,000 ft (6,100 m)

- Cruise speed: 305 mph (491 km/h, 265 kn)
- Range: 570 mi (920 km, 500 nmi)
- Service ceiling: 34,000 ft (10,000 m)
- Rate of climb: 2,920 ft/min (14.8 m/s)
- Time to altitude: 20,000 ft (6,100 m) in 8 minutes 30 sec

Armament

- Guns: 1 × 0.30 in (7.62 mm) M1919 Browning machine gun and 1 × 0.50 in (12.7 mm) M2 Browning machine gun

== See also ==
Related development

- Curtiss P-36 Hawk
- Curtiss P-40 Warhawk
- Curtiss XP-42
- Curtiss XP-46
- Curtiss P-60
