= Philip Rasmussen =

Philip Rasmussen may refer to:

- Philip Rasmussen (footballer) (born 1989), Danish footballer
- Philip Rasmussen (pilot) (1918–2005), American pilot
