= Chrysler IV-2220 =

World War II–Era experimental aircraft engine

IV-2220
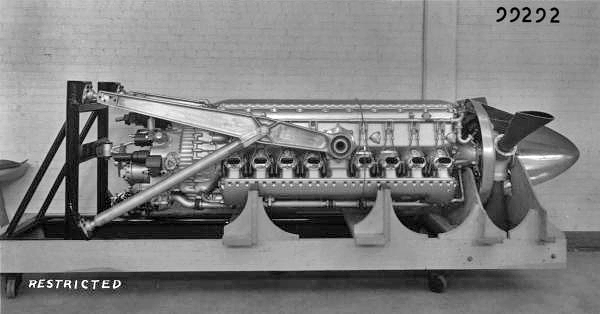
- IV-2220, perhaps a display model (note the cutaway prop). The length of the engine is evident, made even longer by the large accessories section bolted on the left of the block.
- Type: Liquid-cooled inverted V16 aircraft engine
- Manufacturer: Chrysler
- First run: 1945
- Major applications: Curtiss XP-60C; P-47H

The Chrysler XIV-2220 (XI-2220 from 1944) was an experimental 2,500 hp, 2,220 cubic inch (36.4 liter) liquid-cooled inverted-V16 World War II aircraft engine. Although several aircraft designs had considered using it, by the time it was ready for use in 1945 the war was already over. Only a few engines were built by Chrysler during a program that started in 1940, and it retained its 'X' designation the entire time as the XIV-2220, later XI-2220. The IV-2220 is historically important as it was Chrysler's first hemi, a design that would re-appear in 1950s Chrysler performance automobiles, make drag racing headlines in the 1960s, and continue into the 2000s.

== Design and development ==
=== Original design ===
Chrysler had apparently been carrying out paper studies of a very large engine for a brief period starting in May 1940, and decided to present their work to the United States Army Air Corps. They proposed a large engine to provide 2,500 hp initially, with room for upward growth. Instead of using advanced features such as sleeve valves for improved RPM, they opted for a larger number of normal sized cylinders in a V16 arrangement. The Army was interested, and sent them a development contract tender on June 22, 1940, to which Chrysler responded on July 2.

The extremely long profile of the new design meant that the crankshaft would be highly loaded if power was taken off at the propeller end. Chrysler's solution to this problem was unique; power was instead taken from the middle of the engine, placing the propeller reduction gear in a gap between two V8 cylinder banks and sending power to the front of the engine via an extension shaft running below the crankshaft. Additionally many of the accessories were driven off the drive shaft instead of the crank shaft. This approach also raised the weight of the engine by the amount of the shaft, a necessary design tradeoff.

A single overhead cam drove the two-per-cylinder poppet valves, arranged at an angle to the piston in a hemi-spherical cylinder head, with the spark plug arranged between the valves. This arrangement allowed for "cross-flow" scavenging of the charge, and had been used on various race and performance car engines for some time.

=== Pros and cons ===
One early problem for the design was the lack of high-strength aluminum alloys; the original supplier, Alcoa, was able to deliver only half the required strength. Chrysler was able to address this through much improved production-line quality control, but the engine was nevertheless built with considerably more distance between the cylinders than normal, making the engine relatively long. This was not helped by the "gap" holding the propeller gearing in the middle of the engine, or the large accessories section at the end. The IV-2220 was comparatively huge; the 2,000 hp (1,500 kW) Rolls-Royce Griffon of about the same displacement was 77 inches (6.4 ft; 2.0 m) long, while the IV-2220 was 122 in (10.2 ft; 3.1 m)

Weight was not greatly affected, however, and the power-to-weight ratio was certainly competitive at 1.03 hp/lb (1.69 kW/kg). Some of this was no doubt due to the use of a turbocharger in addition to a supercharger for more continuous boost and less power draw on the engine. Turbochargers are generally "free," powered not by the engine directly as in a supercharger, but by otherwise wasted exhaust energy. The IV-2220 also included a fairly advanced liquid-cooled intercooler between the turbocharger and supercharger, and an aftercooler behind the supercharger as well. This complex arrangement resulted in excellent altitude performance, keeping maximum rated power all the way to 25,000 ft.

The engine first flew on 26 July 1945, mounted on a converted P-47D-15-RE, which was intended to serve as the prototype for the new P-47H series using this engine. By the time a second example followed, the war was already over and the need for a new piston engine in the Jet Age was gone. The only other design to select the IV-2220 was the Curtiss XP-60C in 1942, but the engine was so delayed that the P-60 moved onto other alternatives.

== Specifications (XIV-2220-11) ==
Data from Aircraft Engines of the World 1946

=== General characteristics ===
- Type: 16-cylinder turbo-supercharged liquid-cooled 60° inverted V aircraft piston engine
- Bore: 5.8 in (147.3 mm)
- Stroke: 5.25 in (133.4 mm)
- Displacement: 2,219 cu in (36.36 L)
- Length: 122 in (3,098.8 mm)
- Width: 33.5 in (850.9 mm)
- Height: 33.5 in (850.9 mm)
- Dry weight: 2,430 lb (1,102.2 kg)

=== Components ===
- Valvetrain: Single overhead camshaft actuating two valves per cylinder
- Supercharger: With aftercooler
- Turbocharger: With water-to-air intercooler
- Fuel system: 1 x Bendix-Stromberg PD-16D1 2-barrel horizontal injection carburettor with automatic mixture control
- Fuel type: 100/130 grade gasoline
- Oil system: Pressure fed at 70 psi (482,633.0 Pa), dry sump, 120 S.U. (25.1 cs) grade oil.
- Cooling system: Liquid-cooled

=== Performance ===
- Power output:
- 2,500 hp (1,864.2 kW) at 3,400 rpm for takeoff
- 2,500 hp (1,864.2 kW) at 25,000 ft (7,620 m) METO
- 2,150 hp (1,603.3 kW) at 3,200 rpm normal rating
- 1,450 hp (1,081.3 kW) at 2,800 rpm cruise
- Specific power: 1.13 hp/cu in (51.2 kW/L)
- Compression ratio: 6.3:1
- Fuel consumption: 0.42 lb/hp/hr (0.2555 kg/kW/hr)
- Specific fuel consumption:
- 0.54 lb/(hp·h) (0.33 kg/kW/hr)) METO
- 0.43 lb/(hp·h) (0.26 kg/kW/hr)) normal rating
- Oil consumption: 0.005 lb/hp/h (0.003 kg/kW/hr)
- Power-to-weight ratio: 1.02 hp/lb (1.84 kW/kg)

Note: some sources claim the engine delivered 2,300 hp in testing, and that 2,500 was the design power. Chrysler documents specify 2,500 hp, the figure used here.
