= TDU-12/B Skydart =

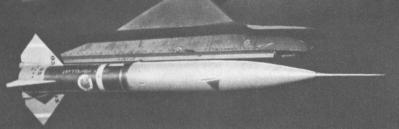
- Type: Target rocket
- Place of origin: United States

Service history
- Used by: United States Air Force

Production history
- Designed: c.1958
- Manufacturer: Curtiss-Wright

Specifications
- Mass: 103 lb (47 kg)
- Length: 6 ft 8 in (2.03 m)
- Diameter: 6.4 in (16 cm)
- Wingspan: 20.8 in (0.53 m)
- Engine: GCRC/Hercules dual-thrust 620 lbf (2.8 kN) for 2 sec 75 lbf (0.33 kN) for 45 sec
- Propellant: Solid
- Maximum speed: Mach 2
- Guidance system: Autopilot
- Launch platform: F-100, F-104
- References: Parsch

The TDU-12/B Skydart was an unguided target rocket built by Curtiss-Wright for use by the United States Air Force. It was used operationally from the late 1950s to the mid-1960s.

== Design and development ==
Skydart, designated TDU-12/B by the U.S. Air Force, was developed by the Santa Barbara Division of Curtiss-Wright. It was designed for use as a target for practice with infrared homing air-to-air missiles such as the AIM-9 Sidewinder and AIM-4 Falcon. It had a small cylindrical body fitted with four cruciform fins aft for control and fixed forwards canards to set the rocket's trajectory. Propulsion was by a dual-thrust boost-sustain solid-propellant rocket supplied by the Grand Central Rocket Company and the Hercules Powder Company. A gyroscopic-driven autopilot stabilized the rocket in flight. An infrared flare was installed to provide signature enhancement for training purposes, and the rocket could be equipped with a telemetry system. Skydart was designed to use a common launching rail and electronic connections to the launch aircraft as Sidewinder. Launch would be undertaken at speeds between Mach 0.8 and 2.0. Design endurance was nominally 90 seconds, but in service 110-second endurance was demonstrated.

== Operational history ==
A $470,000 contract was awarded to Curtiss-Wright by the USAF for production of Skydart. Launched from F-100 Super Sabre and F-104 Starfighter fighters, Skydart was used throughout the early-to-mid 1960s, but was out of service before the end of the decade. Proposals for improved versions of Skydart, including a ground-launched version and an enlarged target drone, do not appear to have been developed.
