= Curtiss-Wright =

American manufacturer

Curtiss-Wright Corporation
- Type: Public
- Traded as: NYSE: CW; S&P 400 component
- Industry: Aerospace; Defense; Nuclear Power Generation; General Industrial
- Predecessor: Curtiss Aeroplane and Motor Company; Wright Aeronautical
- Founded: July 5, 1929 in Buffalo, New York, U.S.
- Headquarters: Davidson, North Carolina, U.S.
- Key people: Lynn Bamford (Chair and CEO); Don R. Berlin; Frank Henry Russell
- Revenue: ▲US$3.50 billion (2025)
- Net income: ▲US$484 million (2025)
- Number of employees: 9,200 (2026)
- Website: curtisswright.com

The Curtiss-Wright Corporation is an American manufacturer and services provider headquartered in Davidson, North Carolina, with factories and operations in and outside the United States. Created in 1929 from the consolidation of Curtiss, Wright, and various supplier companies, the company was immediately the country's largest aviation firm and built more than 142,000 aircraft engines for the U.S. military during World War II.

Curtiss-Wright no longer makes aircraft but still makes many related components, particularly actuators, aircraft controls, valves, and it provides surface-treatment services. It supplies equipment to the commercial, industrial, defense, and energy markets. It makes parts for commercial and naval nuclear power systems, industrial vehicles, and oil- and gas-related machinery.

== History ==
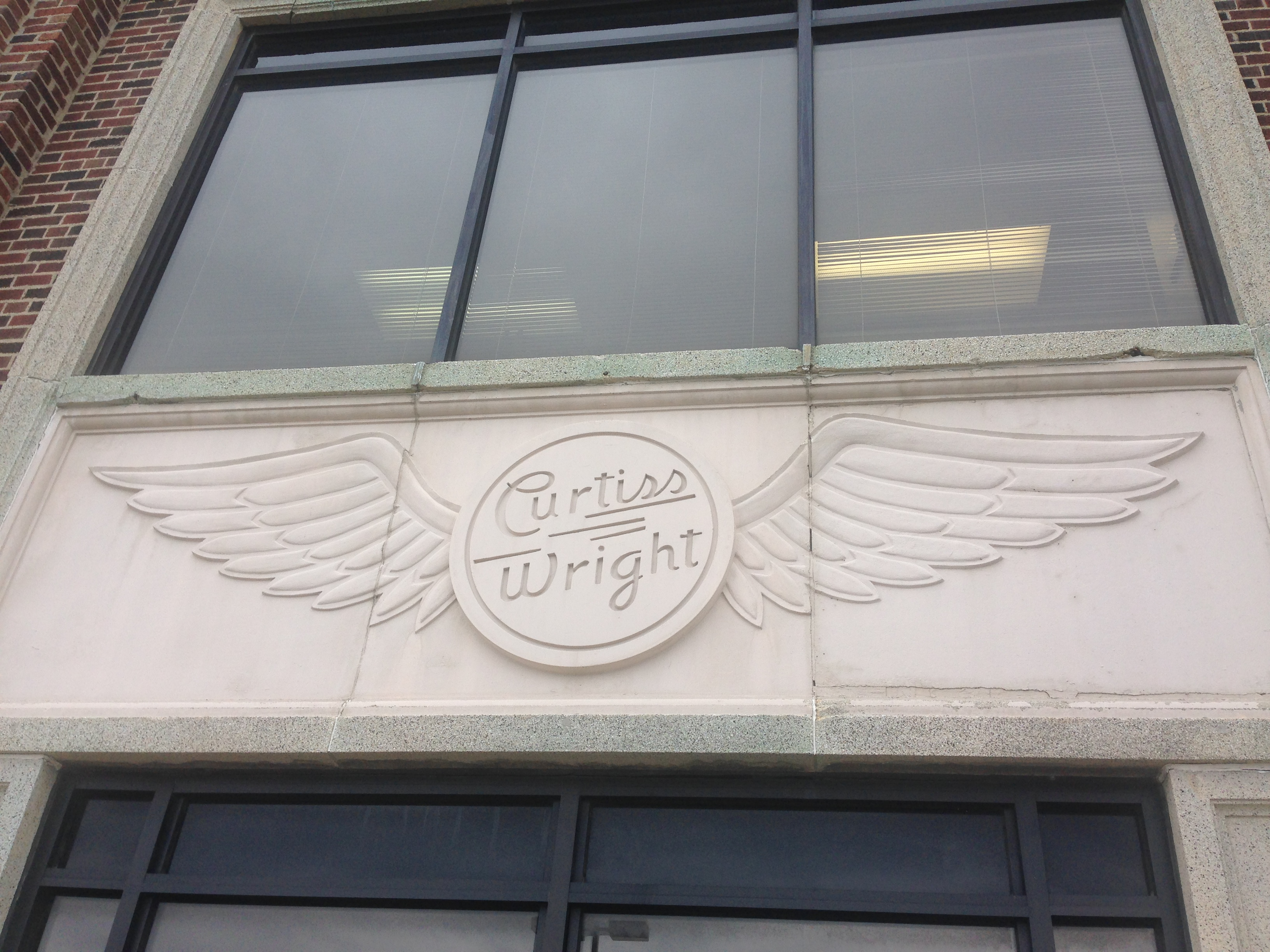

=== Forming the Company ===
Curtiss-Wright formed on July 5, 1929, the result of combining 12 companies associated with Curtiss Aeroplane and Motor Company of Buffalo, New York, and Wright Aeronautical of Dayton, Ohio. It was headquartered in Buffalo, New York. With $75 million in capital (equivalent to $1.41 billion in 2025), it became the largest aviation company in the United States.

Companies Merged	Owner
Wright Aeronautical Corp	Hoyt
Curtiss Aeroplane & Motor Co	Keys
Curtiss Airports Corp.	Keys
Curtiss Flying Service	Keys
Curtiss Aeroplane Export Co.	Keys
Curtiss-Caproni Corp.	Keys
Curtiss-Robertson Airplane Mfg. Co.	Keys
New York Air Terminals	Hoyt
N.Y. & Suburban Airlines	Hoyt
Keystone Aircraft Corp	Hoyt

By September 1929, Curtiss-Wright had acquired the Moth Aircraft Corporation (which primarily built de Havilland Moth aircraft under licence) and the Travel Air Manufacturing Company.

==== Divisions ====
There were three main divisions: the Curtiss-Wright Airplane Division, which manufactured airframes; the Wright Aeronautical Corporation, which produced aircraft engines; and the Curtiss-Wright Propeller Division, which manufactured propellers. After 1929, most engines produced by the new company were known as Wrights. Existing aircraft continued to use the Curtiss name, while new designs used either the Curtiss or Curtiss-Wright name, depending on the location where they were designed, with a few exceptions.

==== Pre-World War II ====
Throughout the 1930s, Curtiss-Wright designed and built aircraft for military, commercial, and private markets, but it was the Wright engine division and the longstanding relationship with the U.S. military that helped the company through the difficult years of the Great Depression. Guy Vaughan was appointed president in 1935. In 1937, the company developed the P-36 fighter aircraft, resulting in the largest peacetime aircraft order ever given by the Army Air Corps. Curtiss-Wright also sold the P-36 abroad, where they were used in the early days of World War II.

==== War production ====
During World War II, Curtiss-Wright produced 142,840 aircraft engines, 146,468 electric propellers, and 29,269 airplanes. Curtiss-Wright employed 180,000 workers, and ranked second among United States corporations in the value of wartime production contracts, behind only General Motors.

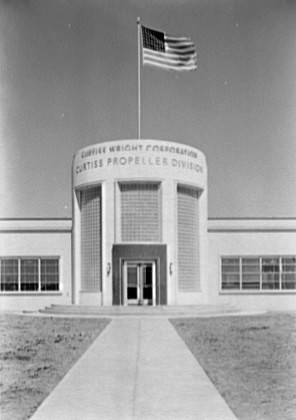
The main building of the Curtiss-Wright company at Caldwell, New Jersey, 1941.

Curtiss-Wright: Biggest Aviation Company Expands Its Empire. This provides an overall perspective on how Curtiss-Wright's business operations in the USA span from St. Louis to Buffalo, and how its newly manufactured products flow from the various factories serving the U.S. aircraft industry at that time. The map gets several things wrong, particularly the location of production of the C-46 aircraft, which was actually built in Buffalo, not St. Louis. This is from an article in Life Magazine on the 15th of September in 1941.

Aircraft production included almost 14,000 P-40 fighters, made famous by their use by Claire Chennault's Flying Tigers in China, over 3,000 C-46 Commando transport aircraft, and later in the war, over 7,000 SB2C Helldivers. Its most visible success came with the P-40, variously known as the Tomahawk, Kittyhawk, and Warhawk, which were built between 1940 and 1944 at the main production facilities in Buffalo, New York. During the war, a second large plant was added at Buffalo, followed by new plants at Columbus, Ohio; St. Louis, Missouri; and Louisville, Kentucky. Engine and propeller production was at plants in New Jersey, Pennsylvania, and Ohio.

In May 1942, the U.S. government assigned Curtiss-Wright a defense production factory for wartime aircraft construction at Louisville, Kentucky, to produce C-76 Caravan cargo aircraft, which was constructed mostly of wood, a non-priority war material. After difficulties with the C-76, including a crash of a production model in mid-1943, as well as the realization that sufficient quantities of aluminum aircraft alloys would be available for war production, plans for large-scale C-76 production were rejected.

The Louisville plant was converted to C-46 Commando production, delivering 438 Commandos to supplement the roughly 2,500 C-46s produced at Buffalo. The C-46 cargo aircraft was fitted with two powerful radial engines and could fly at higher altitudes than most other Allied aircraft. Consequently, it was used extensively in the China-Burma-India Theater.

==== Defective engines sold to the U.S. military in World War II ====
From 1941 to 1943, the Curtiss Aeronautical plant in Lockland, Ohio, produced aircraft engines under wartime contract, destined for installation in U.S. Army Air Forces aircraft. Wright officials at Lockland insisted on high engine production levels, resulting in a significant percentage of engines that did not meet Army Air Forces (AAF) inspection standards. Inspectors nevertheless approved these defective engines for shipment and installation in U.S. military aircraft. After investigation, it was later revealed that Wright company officials at Lockland had conspired with civilian technical advisers and Army inspection officers to approve substandard or defective aircraft engines for military use.

=== Post–World War II ===
==== Demise of aircraft production ====
Curtiss-Wright failed to make the transition to design and production of jet aircraft, despite several attempts. During the war, the company expended only small amounts on aircraft research and development, instead concentrating on incremental improvements in conventional aircraft already in wartime production. This was especially true in the first two years of the war. Curtiss' failure to research and develop more advanced wing and airframe designs provided an opening for North American, Bell, Lockheed, Northrop, and other U.S. aircraft manufacturers to win contracts from the Army and Navy for more advanced aircraft designs.

The P-60, the firm's last prop-driven fighter design, was merely an extrapolation of its 1930s P-36 Hawk, offering no advantage over other designs already in service. With the rapid development of jet engine technology and the advent of near-supersonic flight, this technological lag resulted in Curtiss losing several critical postwar military aircraft orders. The final nail in the coffin was the choice of the Northrop F-89 Scorpion over the XF-87 Blackhawk. After the F-87 was cancelled in October 1948, Curtiss-Wright shut down its entire Aeroplane Division and sold the assets to North American Aviation. Curtiss-Wright occasionally ventured back into the realm of aircraft design, as seen in the TDU-12/B Skydart target drone and the X-19 tiltrotor. Still, none of these efforts amounted to anything, and by the early 1960s, Curtiss-Wright was no longer a major aircraft manufacturer.

==== Flight research ====
While this marked Curtiss-Wright's departure from preeminence in the aviation industry, one notable spin-off involved Curtiss-Wright's flight research laboratory, which was founded in 1943 near the main plant at Buffalo Airport. During the divestiture of the airframe division, the lab was transferred to Cornell University along with a cash gift to complete the construction of a transonic wind tunnel. Cornell Aeronautical Labs, or CAL as it was known, was eventually spun off from the university as a private company, Calspan Corporation, which has been responsible for numerous innovations in flight and safety research.

==== Engine development ====
After the government gave the development of the Whittle jet engine to GE, the company concentrated on reciprocating engines and propeller production for military transport and civilian airliners. With the twilight of the big piston aircraft engine, Curtiss-Wright needed a new design direction. In 1950, Curtiss-Wright licensed the Sapphire jet engine from Armstrong Siddeley in the U.K. and manufactured it as the Wright J65. It powered models of the Martin B-57, and several U.S. fighter aircraft. Subsequent derivative engines were late and did not find substantial markets.

Curtiss-Wright briefly licensed rights to the Wankel rotary engine from NSU in 1958 as a possible aircraft power plant. For this project, Curtiss-Wright relied on the design leadership of NSU-Wankel engineer Max Bentele.

==== Flight simulators ====
In 1954, United Airlines bought four Curtiss-Wright flight simulators for $3 million. These simulators were unlike earlier ones produced in the late 1940s for airliners but now included visuals, sound, and movement. They were the first of today's modern flight simulators for commercial aircraft.

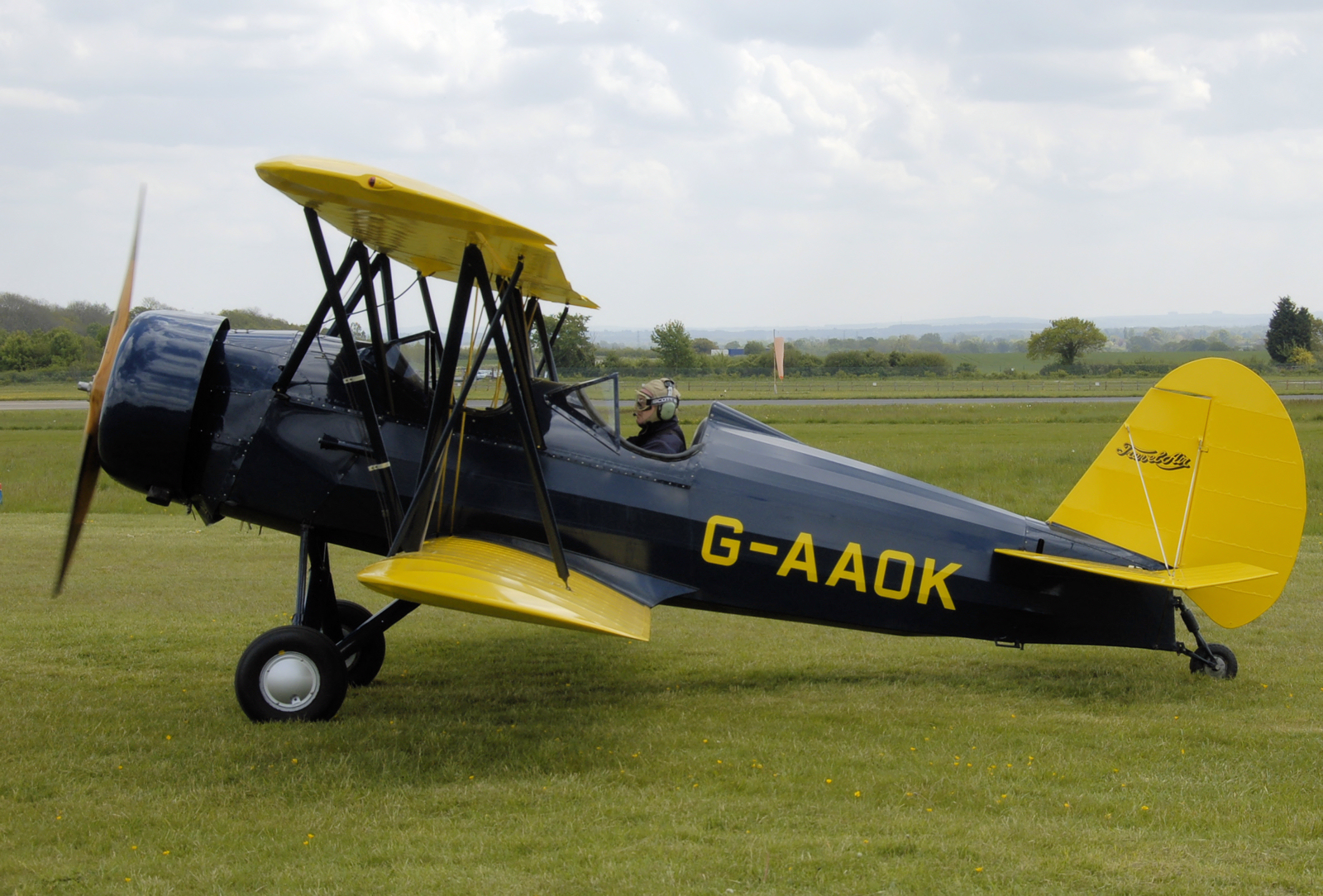
A Curtiss-Wright Travel Air CW-12Q at Cotswold Airport, Gloucestershire, England

==== Business diversification and acquisition strategy ====
In 1956, financially strapped automaker Studebaker-Packard Corporation entered into a management agreement with Curtiss-Wright to allow the nation's fifth-largest automobile manufacturer to avoid insolvency. The relationship lasted until 1959, when Curtiss-Wright withdrew from the agreement. The shift of civilian aircraft to jets left the company with little of its old business, and during the 1960s it shifted to components for aircraft and other types of equipment, such as nuclear submarines, a business that continues today.

In 2002, Curtiss-Wright acquired Penny & Giles, a supplier of black boxes and sensing devices (Hybrid linear, hybrid rotary, and VRVT sensors).

In 2003, Curtiss-Wright acquired Systran Corporation, a supplier of specialized data communications products for real-time systems, primarily serving the aerospace and defense, industrial automation, and medical imaging markets. The acquisition also reintroduced Curtiss-Wright to Dayton, Ohio.

In 2010, Curtiss-Wright acquired Hybricon Corporation for $19 million in cash. Hybricon is a supplier of electronic packaging for the aerospace, defense, and commercial markets, providing electronic subsystem integration.

In 2011, Curtiss-Wright acquired Ireland-based Acra Control for $61 million in cash. Acra Control is a supplier of data acquisition systems and networks, data recorders, and telemetry ground stations for both defense and commercial aerospace markets.

At the beginning of 2013, Curtiss-Wright acquired Exlar Corporation for $85 million in cash. Exlar, a private company, is a designer and manufacturer of highly engineered electric actuators used in motion control solutions in industrial and military markets. The acquired business will operate within Curtiss-Wright's Motion Control segment. In October 2013, Curtiss-Wright completed the acquisition of the Parvus Corporation, a business unit of Eurotech S.p.A., for $38 million. Parvus is a leading designer and manufacturer of rugged, small-form-factor computers and communications subsystems for the aerospace, defense, homeland security, and industrial markets.

Curtiss-Wright acquired military communications equipment supplier Pacific Star Communications for $400 million, on November 2, 2020.

Curtiss-Wright Corporation finalized the acquisition of 901D Holdings, LLC (901D) for $132 million in cash. Designing and manufacturing electronic systems, subsystems, and shipboard enclosures, 901D is a contributor to major U.S. Navy shipbuilding programs, including both nuclear and non-nuclear powered vessels.

In February 2020, Curtiss-Wright Corporation (NYSE: CW) completed the acquisition of Dyna-Flo Control Valve Services Ltd. ("Dyna-Flo") for $81 million in cash.

In January 2022, Curtiss-Wright Corporation (CW) announced an agreement to acquire assets from Safran Aerosystems Arresting Company (SAA), a move aimed at expanding its presence in the military aircraft emergency arresting systems sector. SAA, a subsidiary of Safran Aerosystems, specializes in designing and manufacturing aircraft emergency arresting systems and will operate within Curtiss-Wright's Naval & Power segment following the acquisition. The completion of the acquisition, valued at $240 million, is contingent on regulatory approval and other closing conditions, with expectations for finalization in the third quarter of 2022. The strategic acquisition of SAA is part of Curtiss-Wright's efforts to enhance growth prospects and diversify its product portfolio. With an anticipated positive impact on CW's earnings, the $240 million transaction is projected to contribute to a robust free cash flow conversion rate exceeding 100%, signaling a favorable liquidity position for the company in the future.

In November 2022, CW finalized the acquisition of Keronite Group Limited, involving a cash transaction of $35 million. This strategic move is expected to enhance Curtiss-Wright's capabilities in Plasma Electrolytic Oxidation ("PEO") surface treatment services. Operating within Curtiss-Wright's Aerospace & Industrial segment, the acquisition is projected to have a neutral impact on the company's earnings in the initial year. It is anticipated to yield a 100% free cash flow conversion rate, underscoring the robust liquidity position. This strengthened financial position can be leveraged for profitable and revenue-generating strategies.

== Products ==
=== Aircraft ===
Model name	First flight	Number built	Type
Curtiss Bleeker SX-5-1 Helicopter	1926	1	Experimental single-engine helicopter
Curtiss Teal		2	Single-engine monoplane flying boat
Curtiss-Wright Junior	1930	~270	Single-engine monoplane sport airplane
Curtiss-Wright CW-3 Duckling	1931	3	Single-engine monoplane flying boat
Curtiss F9C Sparrowhawk	1931	7+	Single-engine biplane parasite fighter
Curtiss A-8	1931	13	Single-engine monoplane attack airplane
Curtiss-Wright CW-15	1931	15	Single-engine cabin monoplane
Curtiss-Wright CW-16		22 or 23	Single-engine biplane trainer
Curtiss-Wright CW-17	N/A	0	Single-engine biplane
Curtiss O-40 Raven	1932	5	Single-engine biplane observation airplane
Curtiss F11C Goshawk	1932	30	Single-engine biplane fighter
Curtiss XP-31 Swift	1932	1	Prototype single-engine monoplane fighter
Curtiss YA-10 Shrike	1932	2	Prototype single-engine monoplane attack airplane
Curtiss T-32 Condor II	1933	45	Twin-engine biplane airliner
Curtiss BF2C Goshawk		166	Single-engine biplane fighter
Curtiss-Wright CW-6		8	Single-engine cabin monoplane
Curtiss-Wright CW-12		40 or 41	Single-engine biplane trainer
Curtiss-Wright CW-14 Osprey		38+	Single-engine biplane
Curtiss-Wright CW-19		~43	Single-engine monoplane attack airplane
Curtiss XF13C	1934	3	Prototype single-engine monoplane fighter
Curtiss SOC Seagull	1934	258	Single-engine biplane scout floatplane
Curtiss-Wright CA-1	1935	3	Single-engine biplane flying boat
Curtiss P-36 Hawk	1935	1115	Single-engine monoplane fighter
Curtiss A-12 Shrike		46	Single-engine monoplane attack airplane
Curtiss XA-14	1935	1	Prototype twin-engine monoplane attack airplane
Curtiss A-18 Shrike	1935	13	Twin-engine attack monoplane airplane
Curtiss SBC Helldiver	1935	257	Single-engine biplane dive bomber
Curtiss P-37	1937	14	Prototype single-engine monoplane fighter
Curtiss-Wright CW-21	1938	62	Single-engine monoplane fighter
Curtiss P-40 Warhawk	1938	13738	Single-engine monoplane fighter
Curtiss XP-42	1939	1	Prototype single-engine monoplane fighter
Curtiss SO3C Seamew	1939	795	Single-engine monoplane scout floatplane
Curtiss-Wright CW-22	1940	~442	Single-engine monoplane trainer
Curtiss-Wright CW-23		1	Prototype single-engine monoplane trainer
Curtiss C-46 Commando	1940	3181	Twin-engine monoplane cargo airplane
Curtiss O-52 Owl	1940	203	Single-engine monoplane observation airplane
Curtiss SB2C Helldiver	1940	7140	Single-engine monoplane dive bomber
Curtiss AT-9	1941	792	Twin-engine monoplane trainer
Curtiss XP-46	1941	2	Prototype single-engine monoplane fighter
Curtiss P-60	1941	4	Prototype single-engine monoplane fighter
Curtiss-Wright C-76 Caravan	1943	25	Twin-engine monoplane cargo airplane
Curtiss-Wright XP-55 Ascender	1943	3	Prototype single-engine monoplane fighter
Curtiss XP-62	1943	1	Prototype single-engine monoplane fighter
Curtiss SC Seahawk	1944	577	Single-engine monoplane scout floatplane
Curtiss XF14C	1944	1	Prototype single-engine monoplane fighter
Curtiss XBTC	1945	2	Prototype single-engine monoplane torpedo bomber
Curtiss XF15C	1945	3	Prototype mixed propulsion monoplane fighter
Curtiss XBT2C	1945	9	Prototype single-engine monoplane torpedo bomber
Curtiss-Wright XF-87 Blackhawk	1948	2	Four-engine jet monoplane fighter
Curtiss-Wright X-19	1963	2	Experimental twin-engine tiltrotor airplane
Curtiss-Wright VZ-7		2	Experimental single-engine helicopter
Curtiss-Wright CW-2	N/A	0	Unbuilt two-seat monoplane
Curtiss-Wright CW-5	N/A	0	Unbuilt cargo airplane
Curtiss-Wright CW-18	N/A	0	Unbuilt two-seat trainer
Curtiss XP-53	N/A	2	Prototype single-engine monoplane fighter
Curtiss XP-71	N/A	0	Unbuilt twin-engine monoplane heavy fighter
Curtiss XSB3C	N/A	0	Unbuilt single-engine monoplane dive bomber
Curtiss KD2C Skeet	1947		Target drone
Curtiss CW-32	N/A	0	Unbuilt four-engine transport

=== Curtiss Electric propellers ===
As well as manufacturing engines, a range of electrically actuated constant speed three- and four-bladed propellers were manufactured under the name Curtiss Electric.

=== Albert Kahn ===
Albert Kahn Associates designed several industrial buildings for the Curtiss Wright Corporation, including plants in Beaver, PA; Buffalo, NY; Caldwell, NJ; Columbus, OH; Indianapolis, IN; Kenmore, NY; Louisville, KY and St. Louis, MO. Albert Kahn's personal working library, the Albert Kahn Library Collection, is housed at Lawrence Technological University in Southfield, Michigan.

== See also ==
- United States v. Curtiss-Wright Export Corp., a 1936 U.S. Supreme Court case about the role of the President in foreign relations.
- George Conrad Westervelt
- Curtiss-Wright Technical Institute in Glendale, California
