= Philip Rasmussen (pilot) =

American Pilot

Philip M. Rasmussen
- Rasmussen beside damaged P-36 Hawk
- Born: May 11, 1918; Boston, Massachusetts, US
- Died: April 30, 2005 (aged 86); Fort Myers, Florida, US
- Burial place: Arlington National Cemetery
- Military career
- Allegiance: United States
- Branch: United States Army Air Forces; United States Air Force
- Service years: 1940–1965
- Rank: Lieutenant colonel
- Unit: 46th Pursuit Squadron
- Conflicts: World War II: Attack on Pearl Harbor
- Awards: Silver Star (2); Distinguished Flying Cross; Air Medal (4)

Philip M. Rasmussen (May 11, 1918 – April 30, 2005) was a United States Army Air Forces second lieutenant assigned to the 46th Pursuit Squadron at Wheeler Field on the island of Oahu during the Japanese attack on Pearl Harbor on December 7, 1941. He was one of the few American pilots to get into the air that day.

Rasmussen was awarded a Silver Star for his actions. He flew many later combat missions, including a bombing mission over Japan that earned him an oak leaf cluster to his Silver Star. He stayed in the military after the war and retired from the United States Air Force as a lieutenant colonel in 1965. He died in 2005 of complications from cancer and is buried in Arlington National Cemetery.

== Pearl Harbor attack ==
On the morning of December 7, Lt. Rasmussen had awakened in his barracks when a group of Japanese airplanes dropped bombs on the field. He strapped his .45 caliber pistol to the outside of his purple pajamas and ran to get an airplane.

Most of the planes were destroyed, but Lt. Rasmussen found an unscathed P-36 Hawk and taxied it to a revetment where he had it loaded with ammunition. During a lull in the bombing, he took off with three other pilots. They received orders by radio to fly to Kaneohe Bay on the north-east side of the island.

The American pilots subsequently engaged 11 Japanese aircraft. Despite having a jammed .30 caliber gun and only limited capability with his .50 caliber gun, Lt. Rasmussen managed to shoot down a Mitsubishi A6M Zero. Several other Japanese pilots attacked, including one who apparently tried to ram him. (The Japanese pilot, Iyozo Fujita, returned to the aircraft carrier, Sōryū, and survived the war.)

Rasmussen's plane was badly damaged and fell into an uncontrolled plunge into the clouds over the mountainous terrain. After passing through the clouds at about 5,000 feet he regained control of the aircraft and returned to Wheeler Field, where he landed with no brakes, rudder, or tailwheel. Oral accounts of the number of bullet holes in the plane vary, but most give a figure of about 500.

The opening exhibit of the World War II exhibit in the National Museum of the United States Air Force at Wright-Patterson AFB near Dayton, Ohio features a mannequin of a pajama-clad pilot climbing into a P-36 Hawk. The exhibit details Lt. Rasmussen's exploits that day and is informally titled "The Pajama Pilot."

== Later life ==
Rasmussen remained in the service where he had several assignments in the Pacific, Europe and the Middle East. Lieutenant Colonel Rasmussen retired in 1965 as Chief of Operations, Eglin AFB. He retired to Florida where he died in 2005. He is buried in Arlington National Cemetery.

== Images ==
In flight school

In New Guinea with P-400 Airacobra-Ia of 7th Fighter Command (Rasmussen on wing; others unidentified)

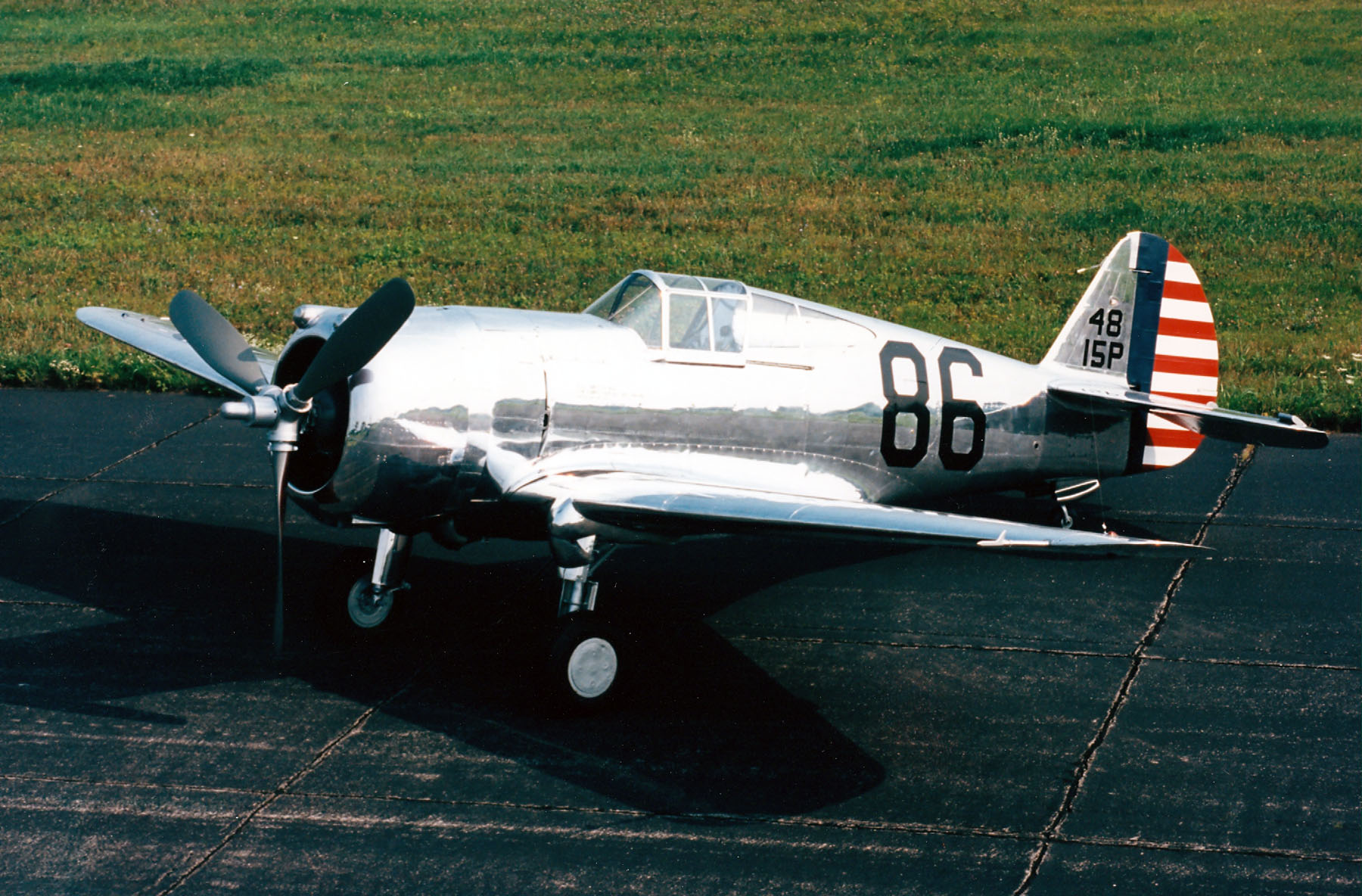
Curtiss P-36A Hawk in the markings of the aircraft flown by Rasmussen during the Pearl Harbor attack
