= Curtiss XP-46 =

1941 prototype fighter aircraft

XP-46
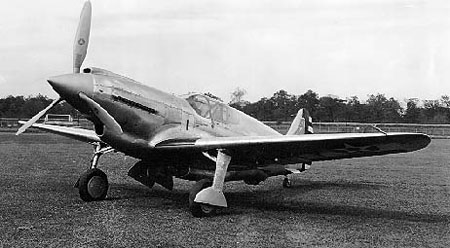
- Curtiss XP-46

General information
- Type: Fighter
- Manufacturer: Curtiss-Wright Corporation
- Primary user: United States Army Air Corps (intended)
- Number built: 2

History
- First flight: 15 February 1941
- Developed from: Curtiss P-40
- Developed into: Curtiss XP-53

The Curtiss XP-46 was a 1940s American prototype fighter aircraft. It was a development of the Curtiss-Wright Corporation in an effort to introduce the best features found in European fighter aircraft in 1939 into a fighter aircraft which could succeed the Curtiss P-40, then in production.

== Design and development ==
A United States Army Air Corps (USAAC) specification based upon a Curtiss proposal was the basis for an order placed in September 1939 for the XP-46. The requirements called for a single-engine, low-wing aircraft, slightly smaller than the P-40, and with a wide-track, inward-retracting landing gear. The selected powerplant was a 1,150 hp (858 kW) Allison V-1710-39 V-12 engine. The planned armament included two .50 in (12.7 mm) synchronized machine guns in the forward fuselage and provisions for eight .30 in (7.62 mm) wing-mounted guns. The USAAC later added requirements for self-sealing fuel tanks and 65 lb (29 kg) of armor, the weights of which adversely affected performance.

== Testing ==
In 1940 the British Purchasing Commission placed an order for the P-46 as a replacement for the P-40, the British service name 'Kittyhawk' was allocated by the Air Ministry in anticipation of receiving the aircraft.

However, the USAAC asked Curtiss in July 1940 – while the XP-46 prototypes were under construction – to prioritize an upgraded P-40, featuring the engine intended for the XP-46. This would also avoid disruptions to the production line caused by any switch to a new airframe. The British order for the P-46 was later cancelled, and the 'Kittyhawk' name subsequently applied to the upgraded P-40.

Two prototypes, designated XP-46A, were nevertheless delivered to the USAAC; the first flight occurred on 15 February 1941. The type's performance during trials was found to be inferior to the then-contemporary P-40D. As the P-46 offered no significant improvement on the P-40, the program was cancelled.

A myth claims that work on the XP-46 was the basis of the North American NA-73X – the prototype P-51 Mustang. While North American Aviation (NAA) purchased technical aerodynamic data on the P-40 and XP-46 from Curtiss for $56,000, and there are certain design similarities in the radiator/oil-cooler configuration of the two types, North American had already made significant progress on its design. (Note: The British Air Ministry insisted NAA purchase the Curtiss data as in 1940 the former company had no experience of high speed flight, its previous fastest design being the Harvard trainer. The data was insisted upon so that NAA had aerodynamic data at high subsonic Mach numbers of an existing high speed fighter as guidance during the design of the NA-73.)

== Specifications (Curtiss XP-46A) ==
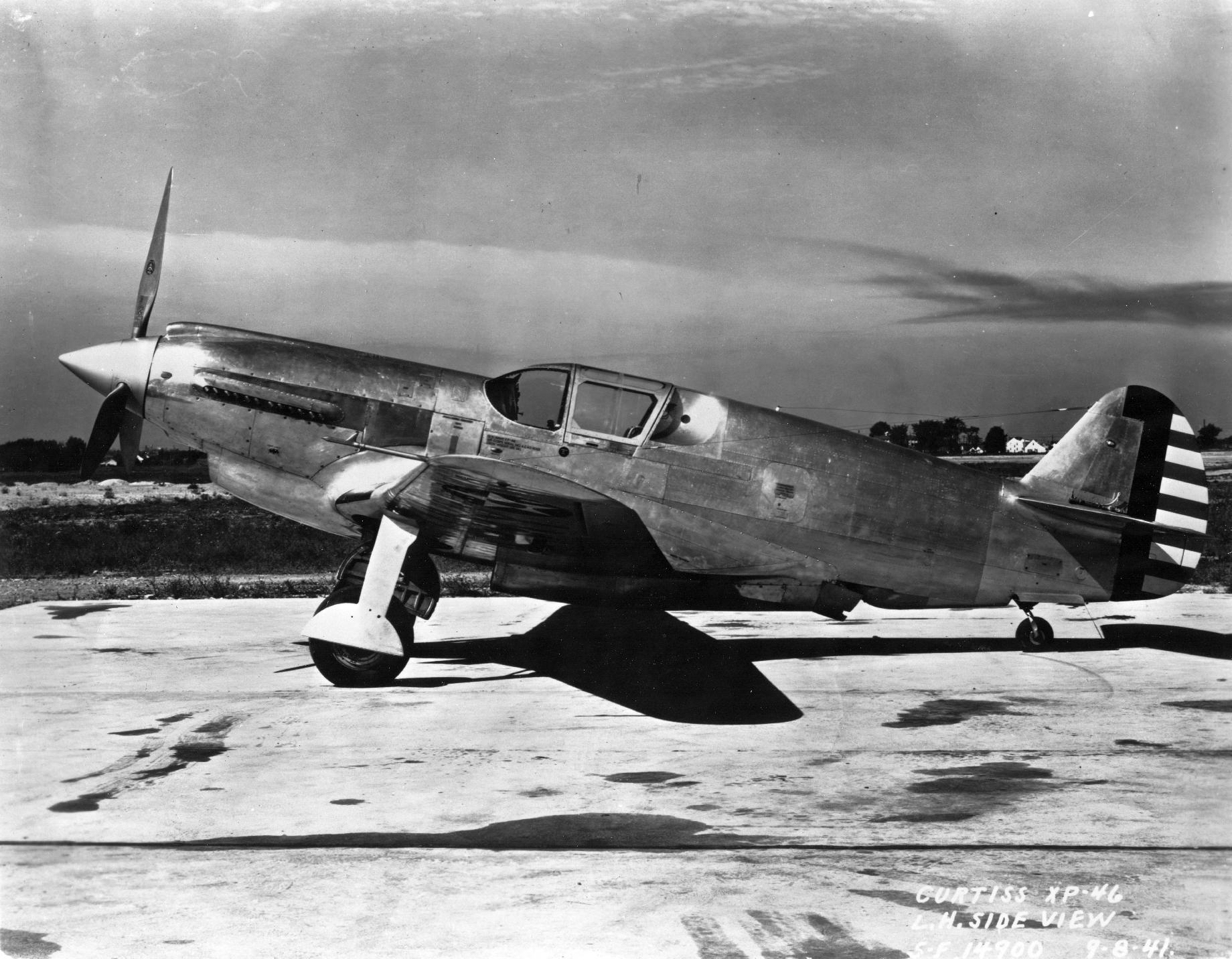
XP-46 side view

Data from Curtiss Aircraft 1907–1947

General characteristics

- Crew: 1
- Length: 30 ft 2 in (9.19 m)
- Wingspan: 34 ft 3.75 in (10.4585 m)
- Height: 10 ft 1 in (3.07 m)
- Wing area: 208 sq ft (19.3 m^{2})
- Airfoil: root: NACA 23016.5; tip: NACA 23009
- Empty weight: 5,625 lb (2,551 kg)
- Gross weight: 7,665 lb (3,477 kg)
- Powerplant: 1 × Allison V-1710-39 V-12 liquid-cooled piston engine, 1,150 hp (860 kW)
- Propellers: 3-bladed constant-speed propeller

Performance

- Maximum speed: 355 mph (571 km/h, 308 kn) at 12,200 ft (3,700 m)
- Range: 325 mi (523 km, 282 nmi)
- Time to altitude: 12,300 ft (3,700 m) in 5 minutes

Armament

- Guns:
  - 2 × 0.50 in (13 mm) synchronized machine guns in the forward fuselage
  - Provision for 8 × 0.30 in (7.6 mm) wing-mounted guns

== See also ==
- Curtiss P-40
- Curtiss XP-42 - an earlier design also intended to replace the P-40, but not put into production
- North American P-51 Mustang
- Curtiss P-60 – a series of designs developed from the XP-46
