= Curtiss P-60 =

1941 fighter aircraft family

P-60
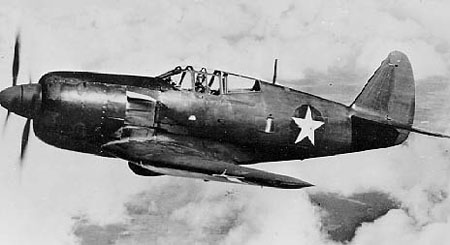
- Curtiss XP-60C in flight, powered by a Pratt & Whitney R-2800 engine driving contra-rotating propellers

General information
- Type: Fighter aircraft
- Manufacturer: Curtiss-Wright
- Status: Canceled
- Primary user: United States Army Air Forces
- Number built: 1 XP-53 and 5 XP-60 (all converted into new variants)

History
- Manufactured: 1942–1944
- First flight: 18 September 1941
- Retired: 22 December 1944
- Developed from: Curtiss XP-46

The Curtiss P-60 was a 1940s American single-engine single-seat, low-wing monoplane fighter aircraft developed by the Curtiss-Wright company as a successor to its P-40. It went through a lengthy series of prototype versions, eventually evolving into a design that bore little resemblance to the P-40. None of these versions reached production.

== Design and development ==
Following rejection of the XP-46, Curtiss put forward its Model 88 in proposals to the United States Army Air Corps. The proposal was for an aircraft using the P-40D fuselage and tail assembly with a low drag NACA laminar flow wing, the (at the time under development) Continental I-1430-3 inverted V-12 engine, and eight wing-mounted 0.5 in (12.7 mm) machine guns. This proposal was accepted and a contract for two prototypes was issued on 1 October 1940 with the aircraft designated XP-53.

Within two months the Army Air Corps contacted Curtiss for an aircraft with a laminar wing and the British Rolls Royce Merlin engine. Curtiss suggested the XP-53 design be used and the second prototype be converted while it was being built; the contract was altered to account for that with the aircraft - known to the company as Model 90 - designated XP-60. A Packard-built V-1650-1 (equivalent to the Merlin Mk XX) as being used on the Curtis XP-40F was to be used. The airframe design for the XP-60 was modified for the different engine, and the main landing gear was changed from the rearward-retracting P-40 design to a new inward retracting version, as used on the XP-46, which allowed a wider wheelbase and a smooth wing surface when the gear was retracted. This aircraft first flew on 18 September 1941 with a British Merlin 28 engine. The XP-53 prototype was then converted into a static test airframe for the XP-60.

Considering delivery delays of quantities of the Packard-built Merlin engines might occue due to its use in other fighter projects closer to delivery, the use of a turbo-supercharged Allison V-1710-75 engine was considered in its place. This was expected to deliver 394 mph at 25,000 ft. Consequently, on 31 October 1941, a contract for 1,950 P-60A fighters using the Allison engine was awarded with deliveries expected in September 1942.

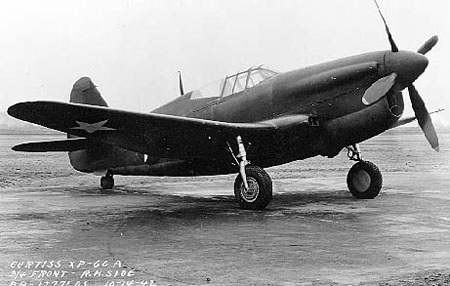
XP-60A with Allison V-1710-75 engine

Flight tests of the XP-60 prototype did not progress smoothly. In addition to landing gear problems, expected top speed was not being met due to shortcomings in the laminar-flow wing surface finish, relatively high radiator drag (compared to the North American P-51 Mustang, which was then flying), and lower than specified engine output performance.

The P-60A Allison engine was not delivering the requisite 1,500 hp, and now that America was at war following the Japanese attack on Pearl Harbor, delivery of existing designs took precedence over introducing a new design into production. Work on the P-60A was stopped after 20 December 1941, when the USAAF recommended that Curtiss concentrate on license production of Republic P-47 Thunderbolts. The P-60 project was not stopped but a decision was taken to build experimental aircraft on the XP-60 but with different engines. The new order issued on 2 January 1942 specified one XP-60A (Model 95A) with the Allison V-1710-75 engine and a General Electric B-14 turbo-supercharger, one XP-60B (Model 95B) with the Allison V-1710-75 engine and a Wright SU-504-1 turbo-supercharger, and one XP-60C (Model 95C) with the 2,500 hp 36.4 liter displacement Chrysler XIV-2220 16-cylinder V-16 engine. While the wing of the XP-60 would be used, the fuselage was more rounded in cross-section.

In February 1942, the production of P-60As was cancelled so that Curtiss could build a further 1,400 P-40s and - to keep its production lines occupied until the P-60 was ready build - the Thunderbolt (Note: 354 P-47G were delivered by Curtiss) for the USAAF.

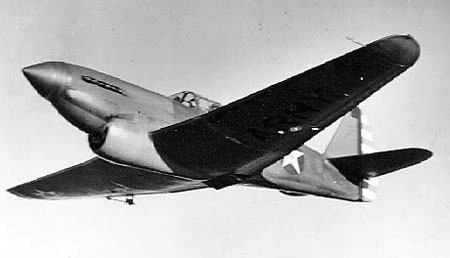
XP-60B, with Allison V-1710-1 engine, in flight.

At the time, availability of the Chrysler engine was coming into question, and after Curtiss noted (in April) that either the fuselage would need changes, or several hundreds of pounds of ballast would be needed in the tail of the existing airframe, to balance the heavy engine, a decision was made in September to install a Pratt & Whitney R-2800 radial engine in the XP-60C. In the meantime, Curtiss installed a Packard V-1650-3 (equivalent of the Merlin 61) in the original XP-60 with a four bladed propeller and the larger XP-60A vertical stabilizer; this aircraft was redesignated XP-60D.

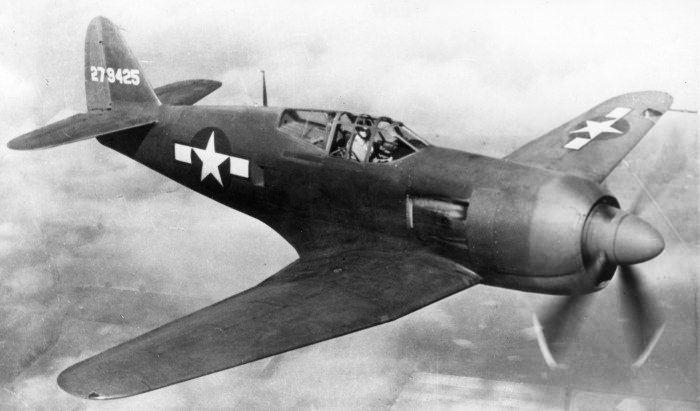
XP-60C in flight

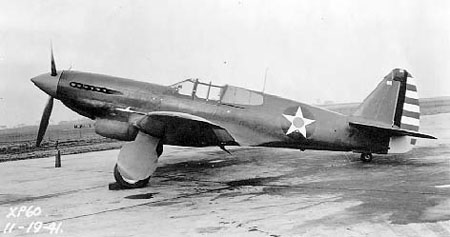
XP-60D with Merlin 61 engine

The XP-60A first flew on 1 November 1942. While official interest in the type was waning (with the emergence of newer designs), the promise of improved performance from use of the R-2800 engine, resulted in a contract for 500 aircraft, officially designated P-60A-1, with the R-2800 and contra-rotating propellers; the first 26 to be YP-60A with single rotation propeller. With concern that the contra-rotating propellers would not be available on time (Pratt & Whitney had to modify the engine gearing), in order to get data, the XP-60B was modified to take the R-2800-10 engine with turbocharger driving a four-bladed propeller. As a result of the other prototype variants, this modification was redesignated XP-60E (Model 95D).

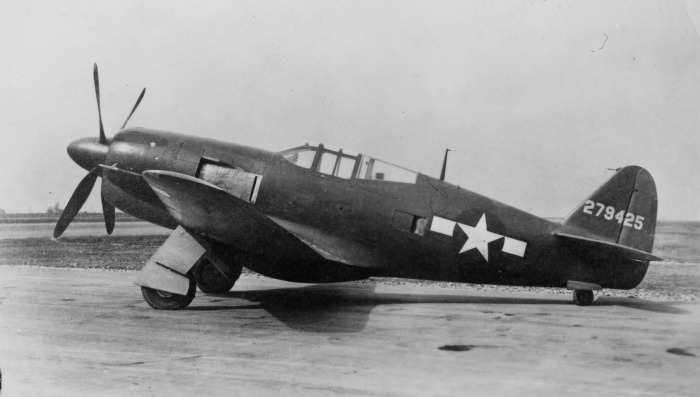
XP-60E

On 27 January 1943, the XP-60C flew for the first time, powered by an R-2800-53 engine with contra-rotating propellers. The aircraft's flying characteristics were found to be generally satisfactory. The first flight of the XP-60E with the four-bladed propeller was delayed until 26 May 1943 after it was found that due to its lighter weight, the engine installation had to be moved 10 in (250 mm) forward compared to the XP-60C.

In April 1943, the US Army Air Forces decided to conduct an evaluation of the various fighter aircraft in development and use, in order to eliminate the least desirable models. With four days notice Curtiss was requested to have the XP-60E participate. As the XP-60E was not available, the company hurriedly prepared the XP-60C (at the time being repaired) for the evaluation at Patterson Field. The XP-60C performed poorly due to flaking wing finish preventing laminar flow and the engine delivering less power resulting in reduction of the production run of 500 aircraft to 20 YP-60A then to just two aircraft. On 6 May 1943, the XP-60D crashed during a dive demonstration.

In January 1944, the XP-60E was flown to Eglin Field for official trials, where USAAF pilots found that it did not compare favorably to contemporary aircraft designs. However, when Curtiss suggested abandoning future work on the P-60 series, the USAAF insisted on completion of at least one of the two aircraft already in production.

== Operational history ==
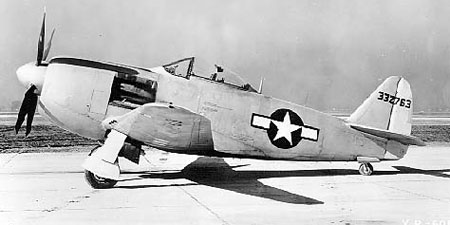
The YP-60E had a redesigned rear fuselage and bubble canopy, larger engine driving a four-blade propeller.

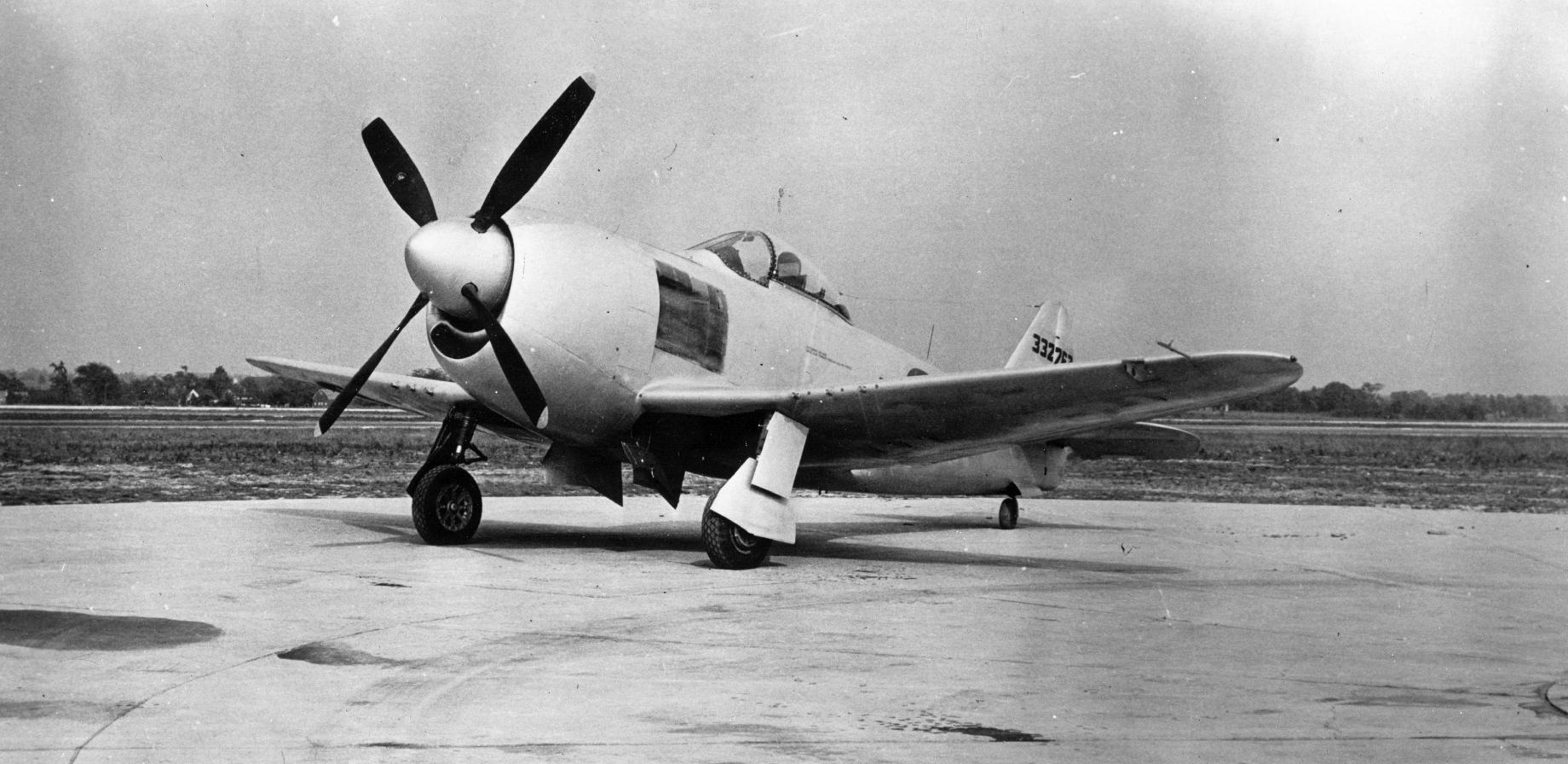
YP-60E:

Somewhat confusingly, the first production aircraft was still designated YP-60A-1-CU, although this was later changed to YP-60E, to conform with the naming of previous prototypes.

The YP-60E was powered by a 2,100 hp (1,566 kW) R-2800-18 engine. It also featured a cut-down rear fuselage and bubble canopy for improved visibility.

It first flew on 13 July 1944 and was subsequently delivered to Wright Field. However, as the government's development contract had already been cancelled (June 1943), there was no budget for further modifications, let alone a guarantee of a final purchase order. Consequently, the only production YP-60E completed was scrapped, on 22 December 1944.

The XP-60E survived to be sold as an entry for the 1947 National Air Races, but crashed during a qualifying flight before the competition was held.

== Variants ==
XP-53
Curtiss Model 88; derivative of XP-46 to Request for Data R40-C specifications. Laminar flow wing and Continental XIV-1430-3 engine. Contracted for 1 October 1940; cancelled in favor of XP-60 in November 1941. Two built, one converted to the XP-60, the other used as a static test airframe.
XP-60
Curtiss Model 90; Rolls-Royce Merlin engine, armament eight .50-cal (12.7 mm) machine guns. One built, first flight 18 September 1941; modified to XP-60D.
XP-60A
Curtiss Model 95A; Allison V-1710-75 engine with B-14 turbosupercharger; armament: six .50-cal MG. One built.
P-60A
Planned production version of XP-60; 1900 ordered, all cancelled.
YP-60A-1
Pre-production version of P-60A-1 with single prop. Twenty-six ordered; two built; one rebuilt as YP-60E.
P-60A-1
Planned production version of XP-60C with Pratt & Whitney R-2800-18 engine and contraprop; armament: four .50-cal MG. 500 ordered; cancelled before any built.
XP-60B
Curtiss Model 95B; V-1710-75 engine with SU-504-2 turbosupercharger; armament: six .50-cal MG. One built, modified to XP-60E.
XP-60C
Curtiss Model 95C; planned for Chrysler XIV-2220 engine, built with R-2800-53 and contra-rotating propeller; armament: six .50-cal MG. One built. Rebuilt as XP-60E; original XP-60E rebuilt as XP-60C.
XP-60D
Rebuilt XP-60 (Curtiss Model 90B); Packard V-1650-3 engine; crashed 6 May 1943 at Rome Air Depot when tail separated during flight.
XP-60E
Rebuilt XP-60B. Curtiss Model 95D; R-2800-10 engine; crashed January 1944. XP-60C reconfigured to XP-60E status.
YP-60E
Modified YP-60A-1 with bubble canopy. First flight 15 July 1944; cancelled 22 December 1944.
XP-60F
Planned modification of YP-60A-1 with different model of R-2800; cancelled before conversion.

== Specifications (XP-60C) ==
Data from Curtiss Aircraft 1907–1947

General characteristics

- Crew: 1
- Length: 33 ft 11 in (10.34 m)
- Wingspan: 41 ft 4 in (12.60 m)
- Height: 10 ft 9 in (3.28 m)
- Wing area: 275 sq ft (25.5 m^{2})
- Empty weight: 8,600 lb (3,901 kg)
- Gross weight: 11,835 lb (5,368 kg)
- Powerplant: 1 × Pratt & Whitney R-2800-53 18-cylinder air-cooled radial piston engine, 2,000 hp (1,500 kW)
- Propellers: 6-bladed contra-rotating constant-speed propeller

Performance

- Maximum speed: 414 mph (666 km/h, 360 kn) at 20,350 ft (6,200 m)
- Range: 315 mi (507 km, 274 nmi)
- Service ceiling: 35,000 ft (11,000 m)
- Rate of climb: 3,890 ft/min (19.8 m/s)
- Time to altitude: 30,000 ft (9,100 m) in 6 minutes
- Wing loading: 39.2 lb/sq ft (191 kg/m^{2})
- Power/mass: 0.19 hp/lb (0.31 kW/kg)

Armament

- Guns: 4 × 0.50 in (13 mm) M2 Browning machine guns

== See also ==
Related development

- Curtiss P-40 Warhawk

Aircraft of comparable role, configuration, and era

- Focke-Wulf Fw 190
- Lavochkin La-5
- Macchi C.202
- Messerschmitt Bf 109
- Mitsubishi A6M3 Zero
- Nakajima Ki-44
- Reggiane Re.2001
- Polikarpov I-185
- Supermarine Spitfire
- Yakovlev Yak-9
- Republic P-47 Thunderbolt

Related lists

- List of fighter aircraft
- List of military aircraft of the United States
