= Vought XSO2U =

American observation floatplane

XSO2U-1
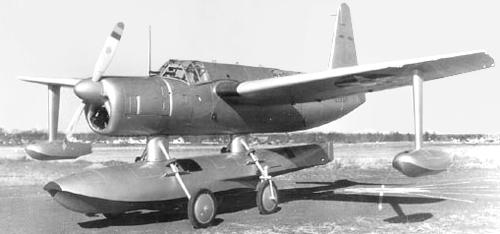

General information
- Type: Observation floatplane
- National origin: United States
- Manufacturer: Vought-Sikorsky
- Primary user: United States Navy
- Number built: 1

History
- First flight: July 1939
- Retired: July 1944
- Developed from: OS2U Kingfisher

The Vought XSO2U was an American observation floatplane developed by Vought-Sikorsky for the United States Navy during the late 1930s. Intended to replace the Curtiss SOC Seagull in service as a scout aboard cruisers, it proved superior to the Curtiss SO3C in evaluation, but failed to win a production contract due to Vought's lack of manufacturing capacity.

== Design and development ==
In the late 1930s the United States Navy developed a set of specifications for a new scout-observation aircraft to operate from its cruisers in the reconnaissance and gunnery spotting roles. Intended to replace the Curtiss SOC biplane, the requirements included that the aircraft should have folding wings, have a superior range and speed to that of the SOC, and that the new type should be powered by the Ranger V-770 inline engine.

Designs were submitted in response to the Navy's specifications by Vought-Sikorsky and Curtiss-Wright. The Vought design, designated Model 403 by the company, was similar to the company's OS2U Kingfisher, which was then under development to replace the SOC aboard U.S. Navy battleships, but had its monoplane wing moved higher on the fuselage than that of the Kingfisher, and differed in the attachment method used by its single-float landing gear. In addition, the radial engine of the OS2U was replaced by an inline Ranger V-770 in a squared-off cowling.

Capable of being operated with either the float as a seaplane or with a conventional taildragger undercarriage as a landplane, the XSO2U utilised all-metal construction, with the exception of its control surfaces which were fabric-covered. The wings folded to the rear for storage in a manner similar to that of the Grumman TBF Avenger torpedo bomber, .

The aircraft was capable of performing dive bombing, and could be fitted with a single bomb or depth charge on a hardpoint under each wing for the mission, or for anti-submarine warfare. Gun armament consisted of two M2 Browning machine guns, one mounted in a fixed position firing forwards through the propeller using synchronizer gear, while the other was in a flexible position in the observer's cockpit for rear defense.

== Operational history ==
Assigned the serial number 1440, the XSO2U-1 flew for the first time, as a landplane, in July 1939; its first flight as a seaplane took place that December. Flight testing of the SO2U showed that the aircraft lacked directional stability; the addition of a large ventral fin, connecting the rear of the float to the tail, helped to cure the problem.

The aircraft also suffered from engine problems, however, that were not so easily cured; the Ranger engine was well known for unreliability, and was particularly prone to overheating problems that were never satisfactorily solved. The aircraft's original XV-770-4 engine was replaced by a XV-770-6, with a repositioned oil cooler, during flight testing; despite this, the problems continued.

Despite the engine issues, the SO2U-1 was considered overall to be superior to the competing Curtiss XSO3C-1; however, Vought's production capacity was already taken up by manufacture of the OS2U Kingfisher scout and F4U Corsair fighter. As a result, the XSO3C was declared the winner of the contract, and was ordered into production. Named Seagull by the U.S. Navy, and Seamew by the Royal Navy, the SO3C developed a disastrous reputation in service, and was retired before the SOC biplane which it was intended to replace.

Following the end of the flyoff competition, the XSO2U-1 was used as a general utility aircraft and hack by the Navy, before being supplied to the Ranger Engine Corporation in July 1942 for use in tests of the V-770 engine. These tests were intended to assist in debugging the engine for the Bell XP-77 lightweight fighter and Edo XOSE floatplane, but the V-770 remained troublesome, and after two years of testing the XSO2U was returned to the Navy. Having no further use for the aircraft, the XSO2U-1 was removed from the Navy's rolls on 6 July 1944, being subsequently scrapped.

== Operators ==
United States

- United States Navy

== Specifications (XSO2U-1) ==
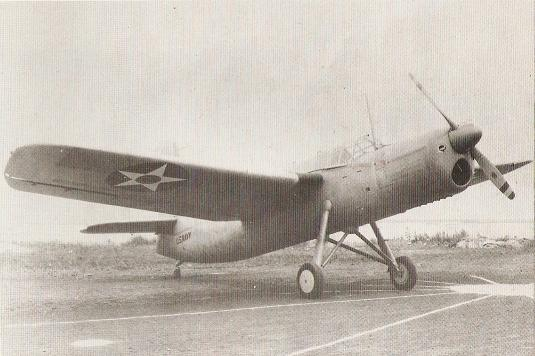
The XSO2U-1 on wheeled landing gear

Data from OS2U Kingfisher in action

General characteristics

- Crew: 2 (pilot and observer)
- Length: 36 ft 1 in (11.00 m)
- Wingspan: 38 ft 2 in (11.63 m)
- Height: 15 ft 11 in (4.85 m)
- Wing area: 300 sq ft (28 m^{2})
- Empty weight: 4,016 lb (1,822 kg)
- Max takeoff weight: 5,624 lb (2,551 kg)
- Fuel capacity: 128 US gallons (480 L; 107 imp gal)
- Powerplant: 1 × Ranger XV-770 inline engine, 450 hp (340 kW)
- Propellers: 2-bladed Hamilton Standard constant-speed

Performance

- Maximum speed: 190 mph (310 km/h, 170 kn) at 9,000 feet (2,700 m)
- Service ceiling: 22,200 ft (6,800 m)

Armament

- Guns: 2 x M2 Browning machine guns, one fixed forwards-firing, one flexible rear-firing.
- Bombs: Two light bombs or depth charges on underwing racks.

== See also ==
Aircraft of comparable role, configuration, and era

- Curtiss SOC Seagull
- Curtiss SO3C Seagull
- Vought OS2U Kingfisher

Related lists

- List of United States Navy aircraft designations (pre-1962)
- List of flying boats and floatplanes
