= Fleetwings BQ-1 =

1940s American unmanned aerial vehicle

XBQ-1
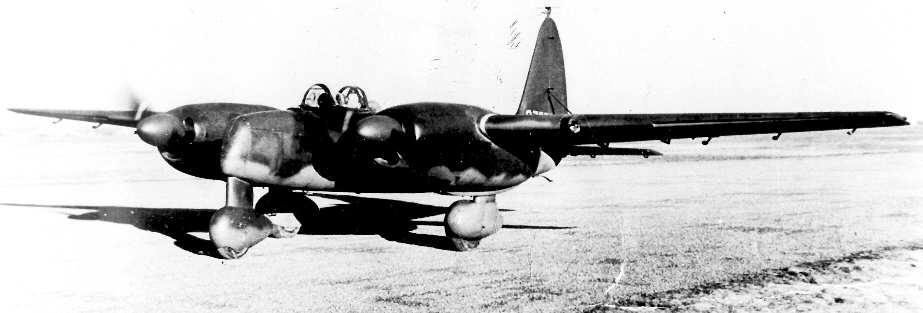

General information
- Type: Flying bomb
- National origin: United States
- Manufacturer: Fleetwings
- Primary user: United States Army Air Forces
- Number built: 1

History
- First flight: May 1944
- Variant: Fleetwings BQ-2

The Fleetwings BQ-1 was an early expendable unmanned aerial vehicle — referred to at the time as an "assault drone" — developed by Fleetwings during the Second World War for use by the United States Army Air Forces. Only a single example of the type was built, the program being cancelled following the crash of the prototype on a test flight.

== Development ==
Development of the BQ-1 began on 10 July 1942, under a program for the development of "aerial torpedoes" – unmanned aircraft carrying internal bombs – that had been instigated in March of that year. Fleetwings was contracted to build a single XBQ-1 assault drone, powered by two Franklin O-405-7 opposed piston engines, and fitted with a fixed landing gear in tricycle configuration. The aircraft was optionally piloted; a single-seat cockpit was installed for ferry and training flights; a fairing would replace the cockpit canopy on operational missions. The BQ-1 was intended to carry a 2,000 pounds (910 kg) warhead over a range of 1,717 miles (2,763 km) at 225 miles per hour (362 km/h); the aircraft would be destroyed in the act of striking the target. A single BQ-2 was to be constructed as well under the same contract.

== Flight testing ==
Following trials of the television-based command guidance system using a PQ-12 target drone, and earlier trials of the XBQ-2A, the XBQ-1 flew in May 1944; however, the aircraft crashed on 17 July 1944 due to engine failure just after take-off from Wright Field. Following the loss of the lone prototype BQ-1, the project was cancelled.

== Specifications (XBQ-1) ==
Data from

General characteristics

- Crew: 1 (optional)
- Wingspan: 48 ft 7 in (14.81 m)
- Gross weight: 7,700 lb (3,493 kg)
- Powerplant: 2 × Franklin O-405-7 opposed piston engines, 225 hp (168 kW) each

Performance

- Cruise speed: 225 mph (362 km/h, 196 kn)
- Range: 1,717 mi (2,763 km, 1,492 nmi)

Armament

- 2,000 pounds (910 kg) warhead

== See also ==
Related development

- Fleetwings BQ-2

Aircraft of comparable role, configuration, and era

- Fairchild BQ-3
- Interstate TDR
