= Fleetwings BQ-2 =

1940s American unmanned aerial vehicle

XBQ-2
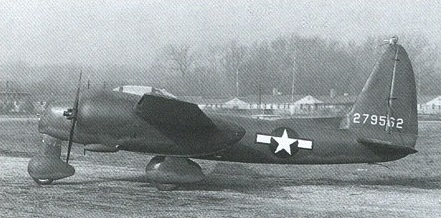

General information
- Type: Flying bomb
- National origin: United States
- Manufacturer: Fleetwings
- Primary user: United States Army Air Forces
- Number built: 1

History
- First flight: 1943
- Variant: Fleetwings BQ-1

The Fleetwings BQ-2 was an early expendable unmanned aerial vehicle — referred to at the time as an "assault drone" — developed by Fleetwings during the Second World War for use by the United States Army Air Forces. Only a single example of the type was built; the aircraft was deemed too expensive for service and was cancelled after a brief flight testing career.

== Development ==
Development of the BQ-2 began on 10 July 1942, under a program for the development of "aerial torpedoes" – unmanned flying bombs – that had been instigated in March of that year. Fleetwings was contracted to build a single XBQ-2 assault drone, powered by two Lycoming XO-435 horizontally opposed piston engines, and fitted with a fixed landing gear in tricycle configuration; the landing gear was jettisonable for better aerodynamics.

The BQ-2 was optionally piloted; a single-seat cockpit was installed for ferry and training flights; a fairing would replace the cockpit canopy on operational missions. The BQ-2 was intended to carry a 2,000 pounds (910 kg) warhead over a range of 1,717 miles (2,763 km) at 225 miles per hour (362 km/h); the aircraft would be destroyed in the act of striking the target. A single BQ-1 was to be constructed as well under the same contract.

== Flight testing ==
The XO-435 engines were dropped from the design of the XBQ-2 before completion, being replaced by two Lycoming R-680 radial engines, with the aircraft being redesignated XBQ-2A.

Following trials of the television-based command guidance system using a PQ-12 target drone, the XBQ-2A flew in mid 1943; following flight trials, the design was determined to be too expensive for operational use, and the program was cancelled in December of that year.

== Specifications (XBQ-2A) ==
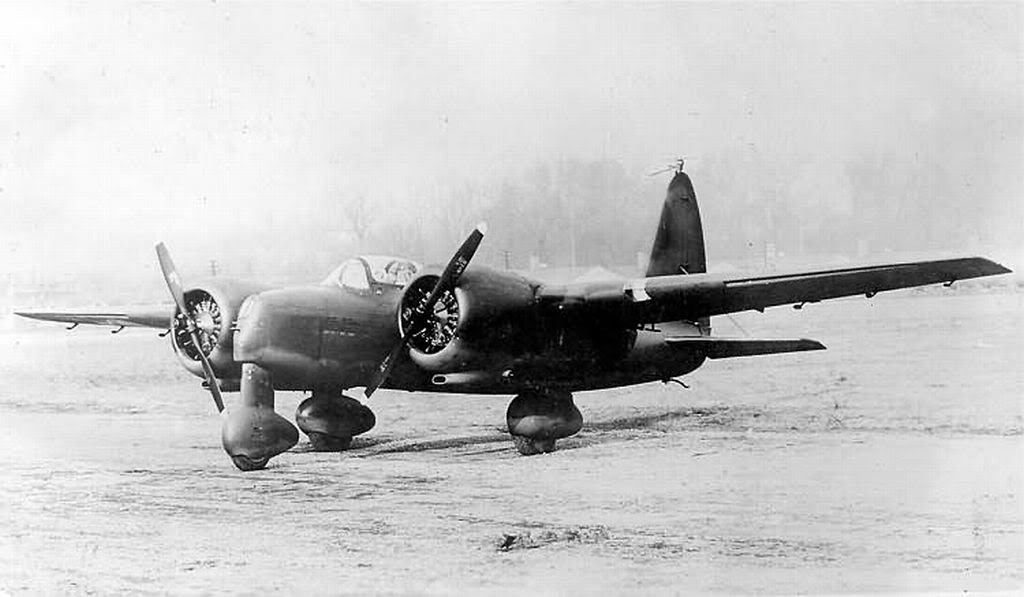
The XBQ-2A.

Data from

General characteristics

- Crew: 1 (optional)
- Wingspan: 48 ft 7 in (14.81 m)
- Gross weight: 7,700 lb (3,493 kg)
- Powerplant: 2 × Lycoming R-680-13 radial piston engines, 280 hp (210 kW) each

Armament

- 2,000 pounds (910 kg) warhead

== See also ==
Related development

- Fleetwings BQ-1

Aircraft of comparable role, configuration, and era

- Fairchild BQ-3
- Interstate TDR
