= Edo Aircraft Corporation =

EDO Aircraft Corporation
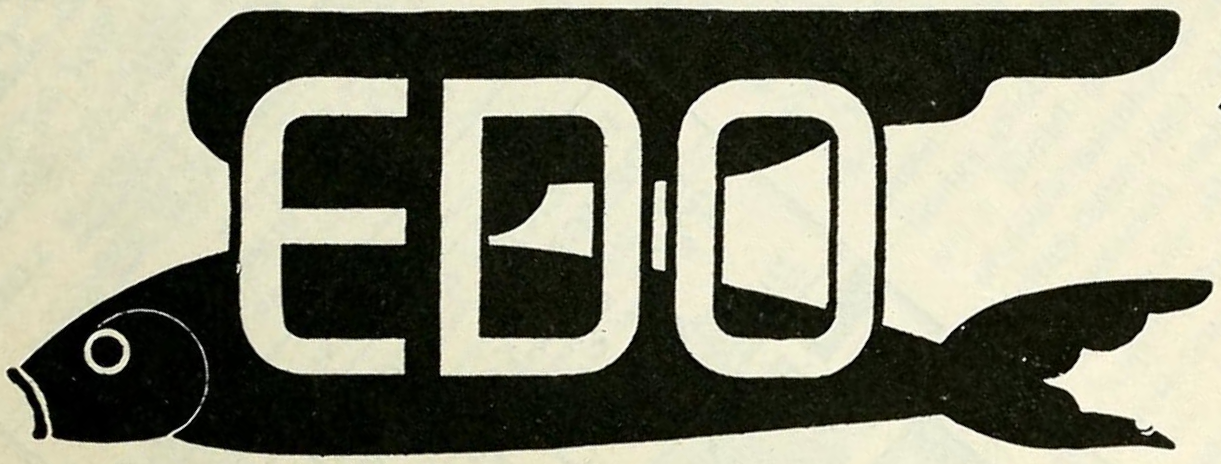
- Company type: Aviation
- Industry: Aviation services
- Founded: 1925
- Founder: Earl Dodge Osborn
- Defunct: 1947 (name changed)
- Fate: Renamed
- Successor: EDO Corporation
- Products: Aircraft, aircraft floats, aircraft instruments

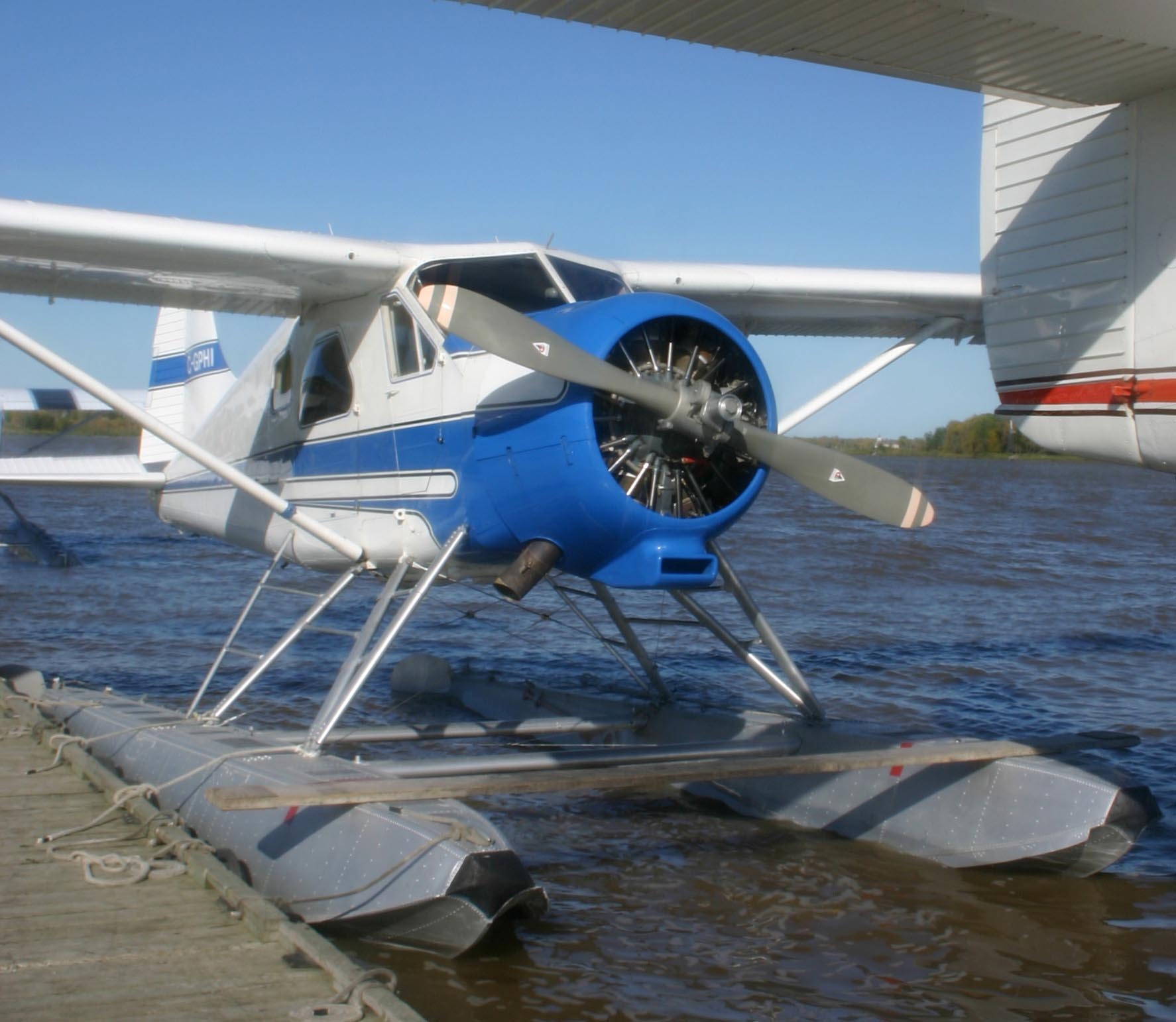
A DHC-2 Beaver on EDO floats, 2004

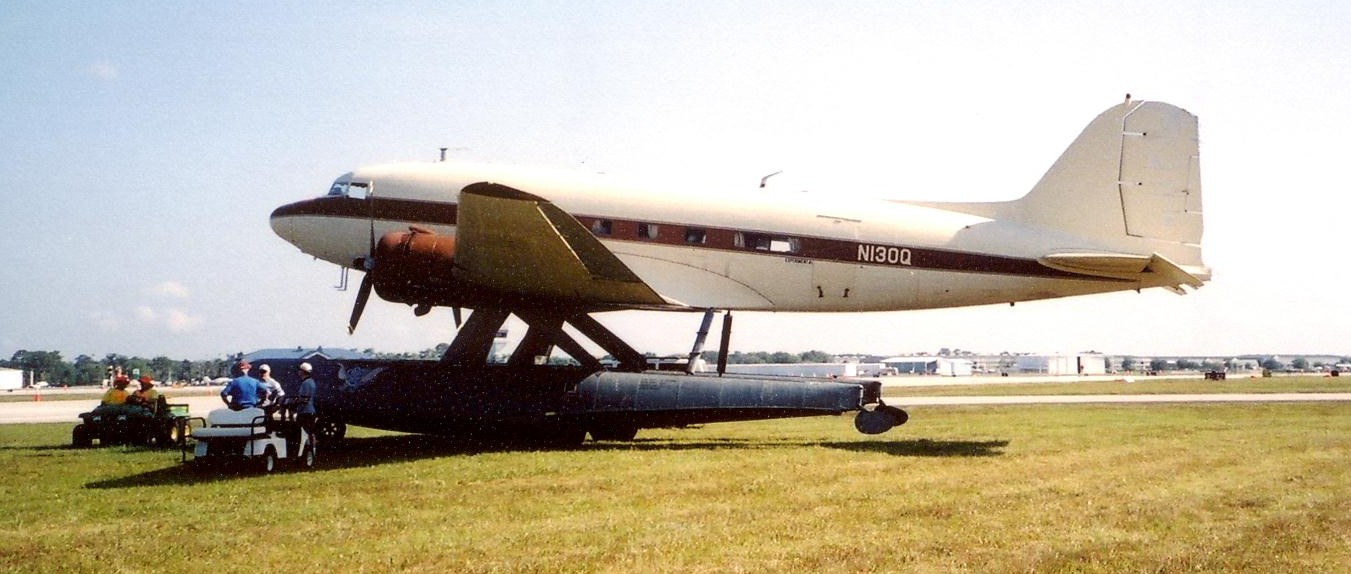
DC-3 on amphibious EDO floats. Sun-n-Fun 2003, Lakeland, Florida

EDO Aircraft Corporation was an American aircraft manufacturing company known primarily for manufacturing pontoons for floatplanes.

== History ==
The EDO Aircraft Corporation began operations on October 16, 1925 in College Point, New York. Although its founder, Earl Dodge Osborne, had dreamed of building airplanes, his first successful product line was EDO floats. Because of a new innovative design, the use of aluminum rather than wood, and the scarcity of hard-surfaced runways in the 1920s, demand built quickly for the floats. With the outbreak of World War II, the company's focus shifted, and EDO began to provide subassemblies for military aircraft of the U.S. Naval Air Corps, U.S. Army Air Forces, and foreign air forces. This shift in emphasis led to the company's being renamed the EDO Corporation in November 1947.

EDO built a factory in 1940 on Long Island, designed by the NYC firm of Malmfeldt, Adams & Prentice. Construction cost was $305,000.

== EDO-Aire ==
In June 1950, Ray Erwin (died 1961) founded the Erwin Sales Company. On 1 March 1952 its operations were reorganized as Garwin Inc., whose business was rebuilding aircraft instruments and accessories. By late 1952 it was also manufacturing its own instruments.

In 1963 it became Garwin-Carruth Inc. In 1966 it was sold to Weston Instruments. By 1966 it was marketing throughout South America and Europe as well as the United States.

In 1969, EDO Corporation purchased the Wichita Division of the Weston Instrument Company. In 1969 EDO also purchased control of Electronic Equipment Engineering, Inc. of Dallas, Texas. EEE designed and produced radio/audio control equipment for long-range aircraft. EEE was moved to Wichita in 1970. The consolidated company was named EDO-Aire.

By the 1980s, the light aircraft industry was in a prolonged deep slump. Annual production had shrunk from over 12,000 units to around 1,600. In 1982, EDO Aircraft Corporation made a business decision to divest itself of the EDO-Aire Group, ending a 60–year presence in the aviation industry. In April 1983, four former directors of EDO-Aire Wichita formed Sigma Tek, Inc. and purchased the assets of EDO-Aire Wichita from EDO Corporation (the deal was finalized on 25 May 1983).

A Wichita Kansas aviation services company, Sigma Tek, was founded in 1983 after its principals had been employed by EDO Corporation.

== EDO floats ==
EDO earned its original fame as the world's principal producer of pontoon floats for aircraft, starting before World War II. EDO floats were developed for the most popular aircraft, ranging from Piper Cubs to the Douglas C-47. EDO's leadership in this field continued well into the 1970s, when it began to get significant competition from Wipaire and their Wipline floats.

The Kenmore Air Company, a small transportation company founded in the Seattle Washington area after World War II, soon augmented its charter operations with maintenance, sales and restoration work. It acquired the sales rights for EDO floats in the northwestern United States. As EDO Corporation began moving to divest itself of its aircraft-related affiliations in the 1980s, it sold the name and rights of EDO floats to Kenmore.

== Products ==
- EDO floats
- 1925 EDO B monoplane
- Edo Malolo flying boat
- Edo OSE floatplane
