= Fairchild BQ-3 =

Type of aircraft

XBQ-3
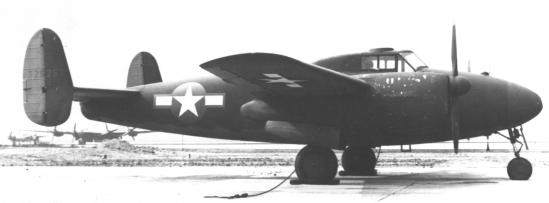

General information
- Type: Flying bomb
- National origin: United States
- Manufacturer: Fairchild Aircraft
- Primary user: United States Army Air Forces
- Number built: 2

History
- First flight: July 1944
- Developed from: AT-21 Gunner

The Fairchild BQ-3, also known as the Model 79, was an early expendable unmanned aerial vehicle – referred to at the time as an "assault drone" – developed by Fairchild Aircraft from the company's AT-21 Gunner advanced trainer during the Second World War for use by the United States Army Air Forces. Two examples of the type were built and flight-tested, but the progress of guided missiles rendered the assault drone quickly obsolete, and the type was not produced.

== Design and development ==
Development of the BQ-3 began in October, 1942, under a program for the development of "aerial torpedoes", later referred to more commonly as "assault drones", that had been instigated in March of that year. Fairchild was awarded a contract for the construction of two XBQ-3 prototypes, based largely on the AT-21 Gunner advanced gunnery trainer already in United States Army Air Forces service.

The XBQ-3 was a twin-engined, low-wing aircraft, fitted with retractable tricycle landing gear and a twin-finned empennage; although the aircraft was intended to be operated by radio control with television assist, a two-seat cockpit was included in the design for testing and ferry flights. Power was provided by two Ranger V-770 inline piston engines of 520 horsepower (390 kW) each; up to 4,000 pounds (1,800 kg) of explosives could be carried by the aircraft in unmanned configuration. Like the contemporary Fleetwings BQ-2, the aircraft would be destroyed in the act of striking the target.

== Flight testing ==
The first flight of the XBQ-3 took place in July 1944; later that month, one of the prototypes was severely damaged in a forced landing. Despite the accident, flight testing continued; however, the assault drone was determined to have no significant advantage over conventional bombers, and advances in the field of guided missiles were rapidly rendering the concept obsolete. As a result, the program was cancelled towards the end of 1944.

== Specifications (XBQ-3) ==
Data from

General characteristics

- Crew: 1 (optional)
- Length: 52 ft 8 in (16.05 m)
- Wingspan: 37 ft (11 m)
- Height: 31 ft 1 in (9.47 m)
- Gross weight: 15,300 lb (6,940 kg)
- Powerplant: 2 × Ranger V-770-15 inline piston engines, 520 hp (390 kW) each

Performance

- Maximum speed: 220 mph (350 km/h, 190 kn)
- Range: 1,500 mi (2,400 km, 1,300 nmi)

Armament

- 4,000 pounds (1,800 kg) warhead

== See also ==
Related development

- Fairchild AT-21 Gunner

Aircraft of comparable role, configuration, and era

- Fleetwings BQ-2
- Interstate TDR
