= Ranger V-770 =

American air-cooled inverted V-12 aircraft engine

V-770
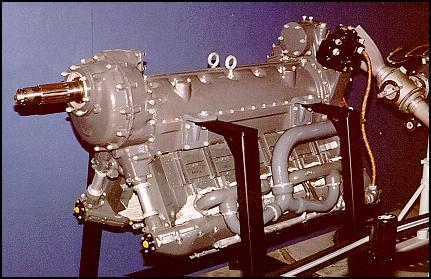
- Preserved Ranger V-770
- Type: Piston aero-engine
- Manufacturer: Ranger Aircraft Engine Division
- First run: 1931
- Major applications: Curtiss SO3C Seamew

The Ranger V-770 was an American air-cooled inverted V-12 aircraft engine developed by the Ranger Aircraft Engine Division of the Fairchild Engine & Aircraft Corporation in the early 1930s.

== Design and development ==
In 1931, the V-770 design was built, derived from the Ranger 6-440 series of inverted inline air-cooled engines, and test flown in the Vought XSO2U-1 Scout. In 1938 it was tested in the Curtiss SO3C Seamew but was found to be unreliable with a tendency to overheat in low-speed flight, but would still be the most produced aircraft to have the V-770, with 795 being built. Its competitor Vought XSO2U also suffered from overheating problems that were never satisfactorily solved. By 1941 a more developed V-770 was installed in the Fairchild XAT-14 Gunner prototype gunnery school aircraft, which went into limited production as the Fairchild AT-21 Gunner, of which 174 were built, not including one radial engine prototype.

Produced from 1941 to 1945, the V-770 featured a two-piece aluminum alloy crankcase, steel cylinder barrels with integral aluminum alloy fins and aluminum alloy heads. The V-770 was the only American inverted V-12 air-cooled engine to reach production. The engine was used in very few aircraft, among them the short lived Fairchild AT-21 twin-engine bomber trainer, and in the two Bell XP-77 light-weight fighter prototypes.

== Variants ==
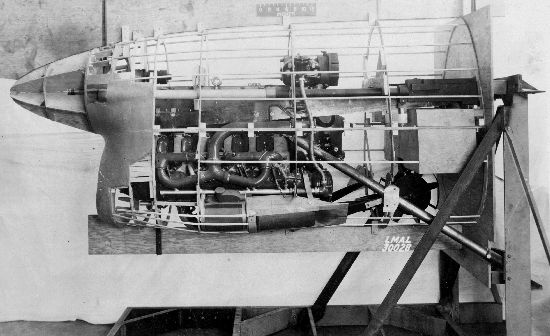
V-770-7 in Bell XP-77 mockup

V-770-4
Installed in the Vought XSO2U-1 scout aircraft
V-770-6
Installed in the Fairchild XAT-14 Gunner prototype, intended for the Ryan SOR-1 Scout
V-770-7
Installed in the Bell XP-77 lightweight fighter prototype
V-770-8
Installed in the Curtiss SO3C Seamew Scout.
V-770-9
Installed in the North American XAT-6E Texan prototype.
V-770-11
Installed in the Fairchild AT-21 Gunner.
V-770-15
Installed in the Fairchild AT-21 Gunner.
V-770-17
Similar to V-770-8 but with raised hollow propeller shaft for mounting cannon or machine gun.
GV-770
Geared un-supercharged variants.
SV-770
Supercharged direct-drive variants.
SGV-770
Supercharged and geared variants.
SGV-770C-1
Tested in the Curtiss XF6C-7 Hawk fighter-bomber at 350 hp (260 kW).
SGV-770C-1B
(V-770-11)
SGV-770C-2A
(V-770-8)
SGV-770C-B1
Installed in the Ikarus 214 prototype
SGV-770D-4
(V-770-17) Similar to C-2A but with raised hollow propeller shaft for mounting cannon or machine gun.
SGV-770D-5
Developed for post-war commercial use, 700 hp (520 kW) at 3,600 RPM, weight 870 lb (390 kg), height 31.11 in (790 mm), length 74.92 in (1,903 mm), width 33.28 in (845 mm)

== Applications ==
- AEKKEA-RAAB R-29
- Bell XP-77
- Curtiss SO3C Seamew
- Edo OSE
- Fairchild F-46
- Fairchild AT-21 Gunner
- Fairchild BQ-3
- Ikarus 213/Utva 213 Vihor
- Ikarus 214 (prototype)
- Vought XSO2U
- North American XAT-6E

== Engines on display ==
- One restored engine in storage at the Carolinas Aviation Museum
- One survives at Cincinnati State Aviation school
- One modified V-770 survives in an art car by Michael Leeds
- The Yankee Air Museum has a V-770 on display.
- One restored engine at the Vintage Flying Museum in Fort Worth.

== Specifications (SGV-770C-1) ==
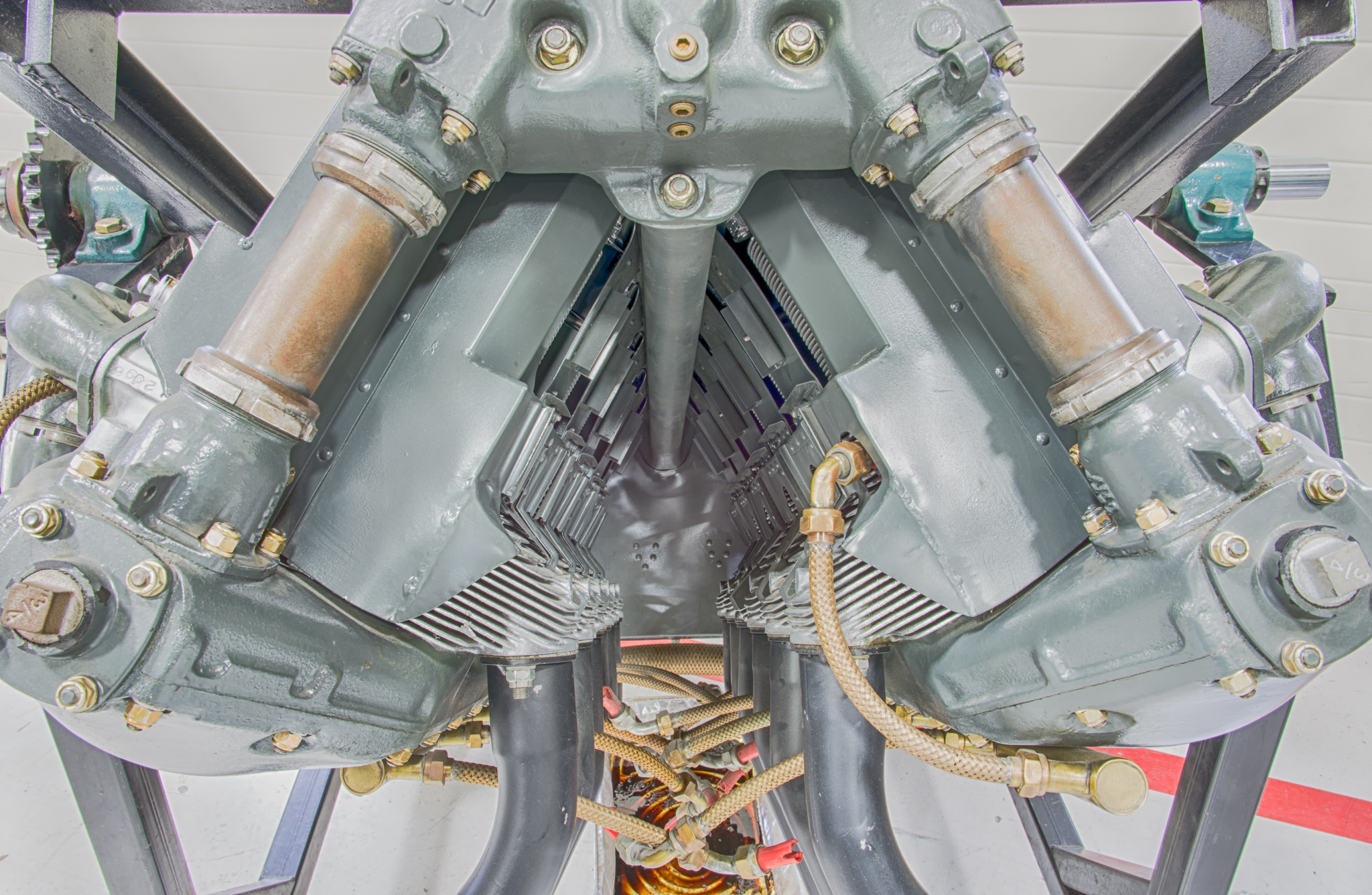
The Ranger V-770 engine as viewed along the cylinders.

Data from Janes Fighting Aircraft of World War II (1989).

=== General characteristics ===
- Type: 12-cylinder inverted Vee piston engine
- Bore: 4 in (102 mm)
- Stroke: 5.125 in (130 mm)
- Displacement: 773 cu in (12.7 L)
- Length: 62 in (1,575 mm)
- Width: 28 in (711 mm)
- Height: 32.2 in (818 mm)
- Dry weight: 730 lb (330 kg)

=== Components ===
- Valvetrain: Single overhead camshaft (SOHC) (1 shaft per bank), gear driven
- Supercharger: Single-speed, single-stage, produced 45 inches of mercury (1.5 bar, 22 psi) at take-off
- Fuel system: Holley non-icing carburetor
- Fuel type: 87 octane gasoline
- Oil system: Full pressure type
- Cooling system: Air-cooled

=== Performance ===
- Power output: 520 hp (390 kW) at 3,150 rpm
- Specific power: 0.68 hp/in³
- Compression ratio: 6.5:1
- Power-to-weight ratio: 0.71 hp/lb

== See also ==
Comparable engines

- Argus As 410
- Argus As 411
- de Havilland Gipsy Twelve
- Walter Sagitta

Related lists

- List of aircraft engines
