= Fairchild AT-21 Gunner =

1943 trainer aircraft family by Fairchild

AT-21 Gunner
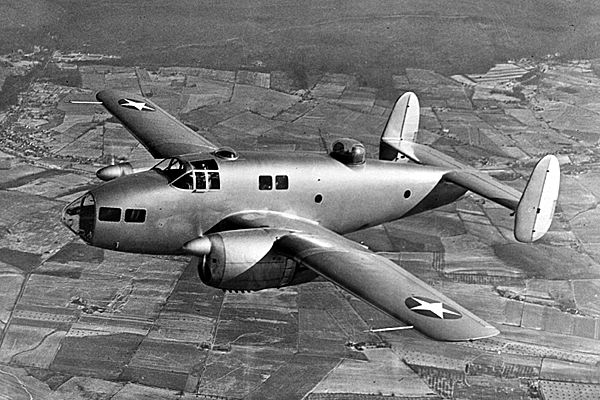

General information
- Type: Trainer
- Manufacturer: Fairchild
- Primary user: United States Army Air Forces
- Number built: 175

History
- Introduction date: 1943
- First flight: 1943
- Retired: 1944
- Variant: Fairchild BQ-3

The Fairchild AT-21 is an American World War II specialized bomber crew trainer, intended to train crews in the use of power gun turrets or a gun on a flexible mount, as well as learn to function as a member of a crew. It had a brief career as a training aircraft before modified bombers took over this role.

== Design and development ==
The United States Army Air Corps (USAAC) issued a specification for a specialized bomber trainer, ordering two prototypes from Fairchild Aircraft. The XAT-13 powered by two 450 hp (340 kW) Pratt & Whitney R-1340-AN-1 radial engines, emerged as a "scaled down" bomber with a single machine gun in the glazed nose and a top turret with twin machine guns and fitted with tricycle landing gear. The concept was to have a single type that was able to duplicate the bomber crew positions from piloting, navigation, bomb aiming/dropping to aerial gunnery.

The second prototype, designated the XAT-14 was similar in layout but was powered by two 520 hp (388 kW) Ranger V-770 inline inverted 12-cylinder vee-type engines. It first flew in late 1942. A further refinement to suit the aircraft for bombardier training with the nose gun and turret removed, led to a new designation, the XAT-14A. Both prototypes featured an unusual construction, being built from "Duramold" plastic-bonded plywood. At the end of the testing period, the USAAC ordered the inline version as the AT-21 Gunner, specialized for gunnery training. The AT-21 had a crew of five, pilot, co-pilot/gunnery instructor and three pupils.

Fairchild Aircraft Company built one aircraft in Hagerstown and 106 aircraft at their Burlington, North Carolina plant in 1943 and 1944, while Bellanca Aircraft built 39 at New Castle, Delaware, and McDonnell built 30 aircraft at their St. Louis plant. Both companies were enlisted to speed production and delivery to training units.

== Operational history ==
The AT-21 proved unsuitable for use as a trainer due to vibration and oscillation tendencies, as well as an inherent instability caused by the short distance between the rudders and the gull wing. The aerodynamic instability resulted in unacceptable yaw when even slight rudder movements were made.

Deemed unsuitable for its original purpose, the AT-21 was evaluated as an advanced pilot trainer. This also did not work out well, due to poor single-engine performance and multiple landing gear problems. The aircraft was withdrawn from service in 1944 and was replaced in training by examples of the actual aircraft in which the gunners would eventually serve. Many AT-21s were then relegated to target-tow duties.

A small number of AT-21s survived as civilian examples, with one (s/n 42-48053 owned by Craig Cantwell) still in existence in North Texas awaiting restoration.

=== BQ-3 Assault Drone ===
In October 1942, the U.S. Army Air Forces ordered two XBQ-3 "aerial torpedoes", based on the AT-21 design. Optionally piloted for flight testing and intended to carry 4,000 lb (1,800 kg) of explosive, the XBQ-3 first flew in July 1944, but the project was cancelled later that year.

== Variants ==
XAT-13
Twin-engined bomber crew trainer powered by two 450 hp (340 kW) Pratt & Whitney R-1340-AN-1 engines, one built, serial number 41-19500
XAT-14
AT-13 variant with two 520 hp (390 kW) Ranger V-770-6 engines, one built, later converted to XAT-14A, serial number 41-19503
XAT-14A
XAT-14 modified as a bombardier trainer with dorsal turret and nose gun removed.
AT-21
Production version of the XAT-14A with two 520 hp (388 kW) Ranger V-770-11 or -15 engines, 164 built.
XBQ-3
Guided bomb version, AT-21 modified with a 4,000 lb (1,800 kg) explosive charge in fuselage.

== Operators ==
United States

- United States Army Air Forces

== Specifications (AT-21) ==
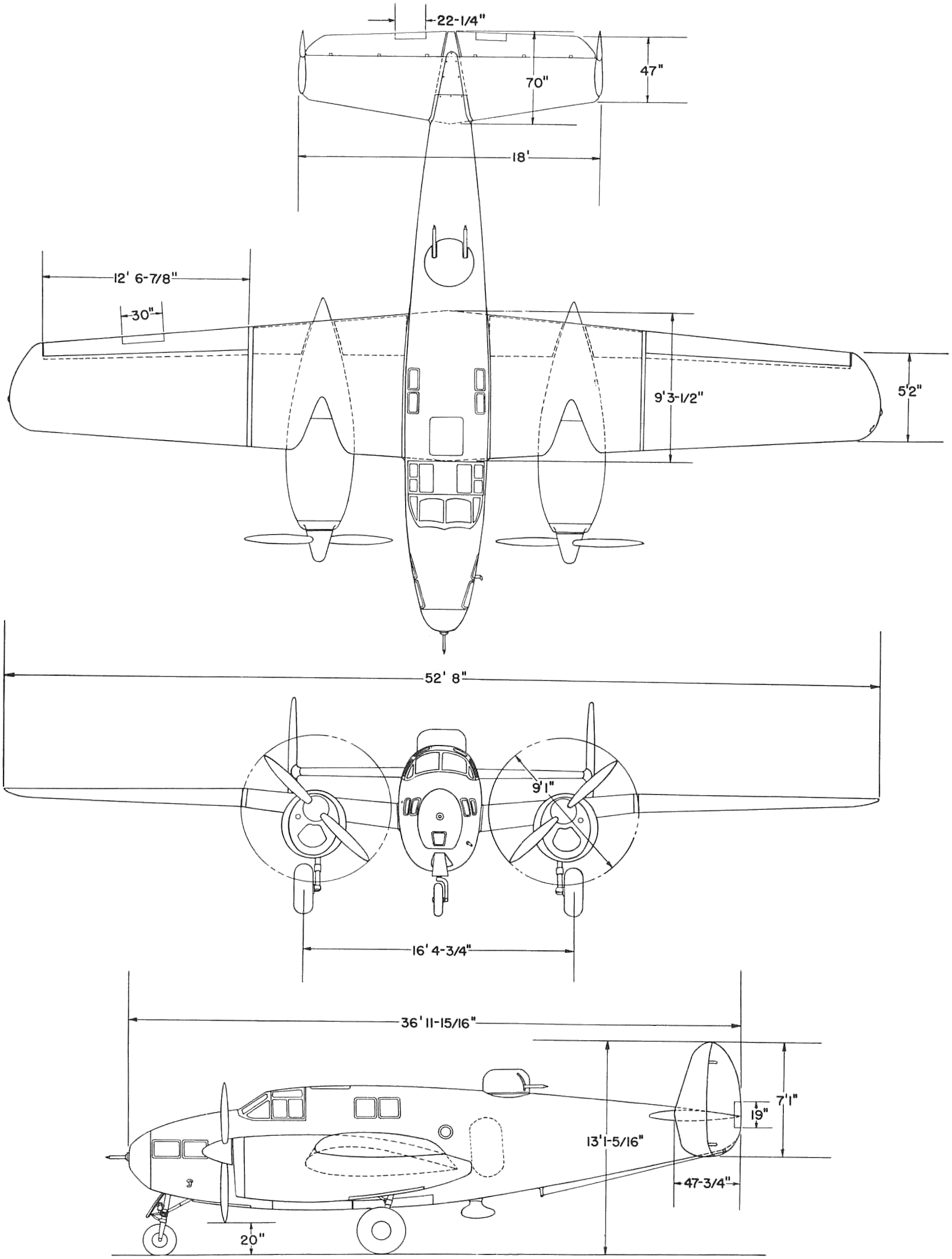
3-view line drawing of the Fairchild AT-21 Gunner

Data from The Complete Encyclopedia of World Aircraft

General characteristics

- Crew: five
- Length: 38 ft (12 m)
- Wingspan: 52 ft 8 in (16.05 m)
- Height: 13 ft 1.25 in (3.9942 m)
- Wing area: 378 sq ft (35.1 m^{2})
- Empty weight: 8,654 lb (3,925 kg)
- Gross weight: 11,288 lb (5,120 kg)
- Max takeoff weight: 12,500 lb (5,670 kg)
- Powerplant: 2 × Ranger V-770-11/15 12-cylinder inverted-vee air-cooled piston engine, 520 hp (390 kW) each

Performance

- Maximum speed: 196 kn (225 mph, 362 km/h)
- Cruise speed: 170 kn (196 mph, 315 km/h)
- Range: 790 nmi (910 mi, 1,460 km)
- Service ceiling: 22,150 ft (6,750 m)
- Rate of climb: 930 ft/min (4.7 m/s)

Armament

- one 0.30 in (7.62 mm) Browning trainable machine-gun in the nose
- two 0.30 in (7.62 mm) Browning machine guns in a power operated dorsal turret

== See also ==
Related development

- Fairchild BQ-3

Related lists

- List of military aircraft of the United States
