= Curtiss SO3C Seamew =

American floatplane reconnaissance plane

SO3C Seamew
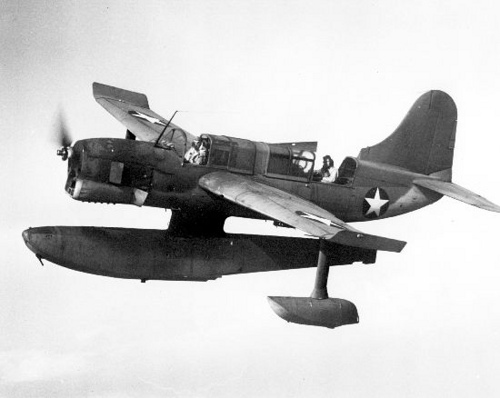

General information
- Type: Observation floatplane
- Manufacturer: Curtiss-Wright
- Primary users: United States Navy Fleet Air Arm
- Number built: 795

History
- Introduction date: 1942
- First flight: 6 October 1939
- Retired: 1945

The Curtiss SO3C Seamew was developed by the Curtiss-Wright Corporation as a replacement for the SOC Seagull as the United States Navy's standard floatplane scout. Curtiss named the SO3C the Seamew but in 1941 the US Navy began calling it by the name Seagull, the same name as the aircraft it replaced (the Curtiss SOC a biplane type), causing some confusion. The British Royal Navy kept the Curtiss name, Seamew, for the SO3Cs that they ordered. One of the US Navy's main design requirements was that the SOC Seagull's replacement had to be able to operate both from ocean vessels with a single center float and from land bases with the float replaced by a wheeled landing gear.

== Design and development ==
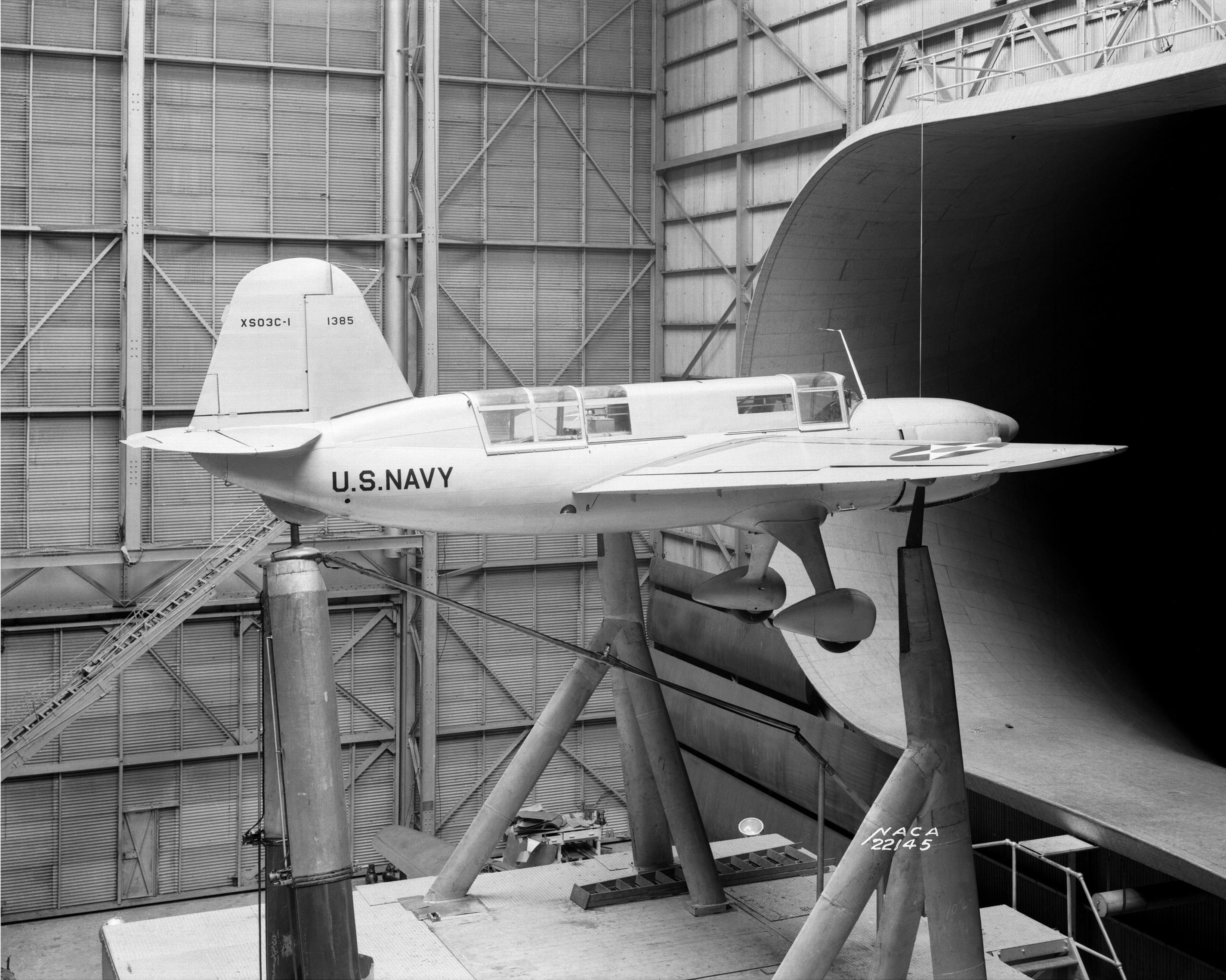
The Curtiss XSO3C in a wind tunnel, 1940

From the time it entered service the SO3C suffered two serious flaws: inflight stability problems and problems with the unique Ranger air-cooled, inverted V-shaped inline engine. The stability problem was mostly resolved with the introduction of upturned wingtips and a larger rear tail surface that extended over the rear observer's cockpit. The additional tail surface was attached to the rear observer's sliding canopy and pilots claimed there were still stability problems when the canopy was open; the canopy was often open because the aircraft's main role was spotting. While the in-flight stability problem was eventually addressed (although not fully solved), the Ranger XV-770 engine proved a dismal failure even after many attempted modifications. Poor flight performance and a poor maintenance record led to the SO3C being withdrawn from US Navy first line units by 1944. The older biplane SOC was taken from stateside training units and restored to first-line service on many US Navy warships until the end of World War II.

== Operational history ==
=== Royal Navy service ===
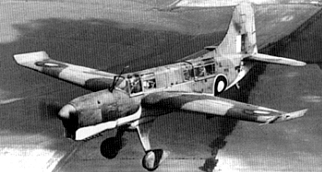
A Royal Navy Seamew Mk I

A number of the SO3C-1s, a fixed undercarriage version, were ordered by the Royal Navy Fleet Air Arm under the terms of Lend-Lease. In RN service the SO3C was given the designation "Seamew", a name used again in the 1950s for the Short Seamew. Crews gave it the name "Sea Cow".

Lettice Curtis, in her book Forgotten Pilots, stated "that although its standard fuel tanks held 300 gallons, it would only just take off with the eighty gallons" fixed as the maximum for Air Transport Auxiliary trips. In addition the tail needed to be raised before becoming airborne, as "it was possible to take off in an attitude from which it was both impossible to recover and in which there was no aileron control." The final comment from this experienced pilot was "it is hard to imagine how, even in wartime, such an aircraft could have been accepted from the factory, let alone given valuable cargo space across the Atlantic."

The first batch for the RN was to have a centreline bomb rack and arrestor gear. Later versions, known as the Seamew Mk.I, were the SO3-2C variant. 250 Seamews were allocated and some 100 actually delivered, the last batch was refused in favour of additional Vought Kingfishers. Deliveries to the RN started in January 1944. It was declared obsolete in September the same year and completely removed from service in 1945.

The SO3C-1K was to have been taken into service as the Queen Seamew, but an order of 30 was canceled.

Seamews served with No. 744 NAS and No. 745 NAS at RCAF Yarmouth, Nova Scotia, Canada, and with No. 755 NAS based in Hampshire, UK.

== Variants ==
XSO3C-1
Prototype, one built originally as a landplane and later modified as a floatplane.
SO3C-1
Production variant, 141 built.
SO3C-1K
SO3C-1 aircraft modified as target drones, some to the Royal Navy as the Queen Seamew I.
SO3C-2
Similar to SO3C-1 but with arrester gear, landplane variant could be fitted with a ventral bomb rack, 200 built.
SO3C-2C
Lend-lease variant of the SO3C-2 with improved radio and 24V electrical system, for the Royal Navy as the Seamew I, 259 ordered but only about 59 were built.
SO3C-3
Reduced weight variant with detailed improvements and catapult operation ability removed, 39 built with a further 659 cancelled.
SO3C-4
Proposed variant of the SO3C-3 with arrester hook and catapult capable, not built.
SO3C-4B
Lend-lease variant of the SO3C-4 for the Royal Navy as the Seamew II, not built.

== Operators ==
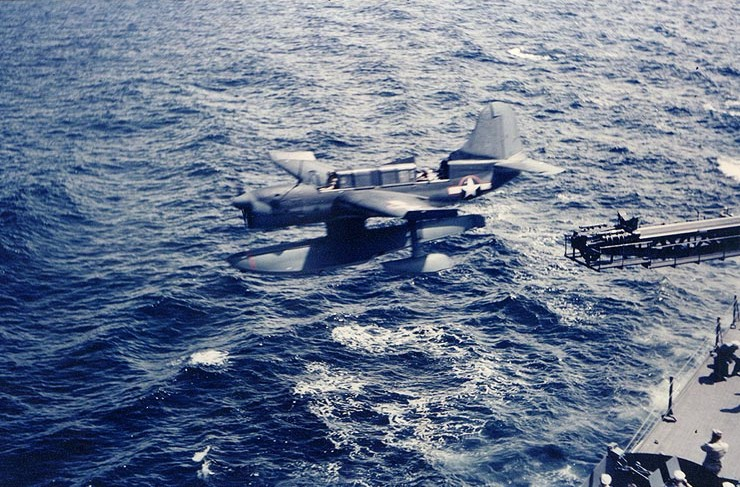
An SO3C is catapulted from the USS Biloxi, October 1943.

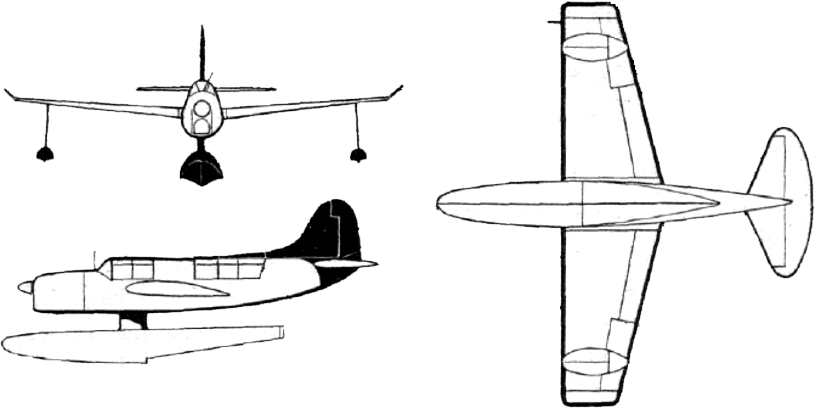
Line drawings for the SO3C.

United Kingdom

- Royal Navy, Fleet Air Arm
  - 744 Naval Air Squadron
  - 745 Naval Air Squadron
  - 755 Naval Air Squadron

United States

- United States Navy

== Specifications (SO3C-2) ==
Data from American Warplanes of World War II

General characteristics

- Crew: 2
- Length: 36 ft 10 in (11.23 m) seaplane; 34 ft 2 in (10.41 m) landplane
- Wingspan: 38 ft 0 in (11.58 m)
- Height: 15 ft 0 in (4.57 m)
- Wing area: 290 sq ft (27 m^{2})
- Empty weight: 4,284 lb (1,943 kg)
- Max takeoff weight: 5,729 lb (2,599 kg)
- Powerplant: 1 × Ranger V-770-6 inverted V-12 air-cooled piston engine, 600 hp (450 kW)
- Propellers: 2-bladed constant-speed propeller

Performance

- Maximum speed: 172 mph (277 km/h, 149 kn)
- Cruise speed: 123 mph (198 km/h, 107 kn)
- Range: 1,150 mi (1,850 km, 1,000 nmi)
- Endurance: 8 hours
- Service ceiling: 15,800 ft (4,800 m)
- Wing loading: 19.8 lb/sq ft (97 kg/m^{2})
- Power/mass: 0.10 hp/lb (0.16 kW/kg)

Armament

- 1× 0.30 in (7.62 mm) forward firing M1919 Browning machine gun and 1× 0.50 in (12.7 mm) M2 Browning machine gun in rear cockpit
- 2× 100 lb (45 kg) bombs or 325 lb (147 kg) depth charges underwing

== See also ==
Aircraft of comparable role, configuration, and era

- Arado Ar 196
- Curtiss SOC Seagull
- Mitsubishi F1M
- Supermarine Walrus
- Vought OS2U Kingfisher

Related lists

- List of aircraft of World War II
- List of aircraft of the Fleet Air Arm
- List of United States Navy aircraft designations (pre-1962)
