= Edo OSE =

1946 naval observation floatplane family

OSE
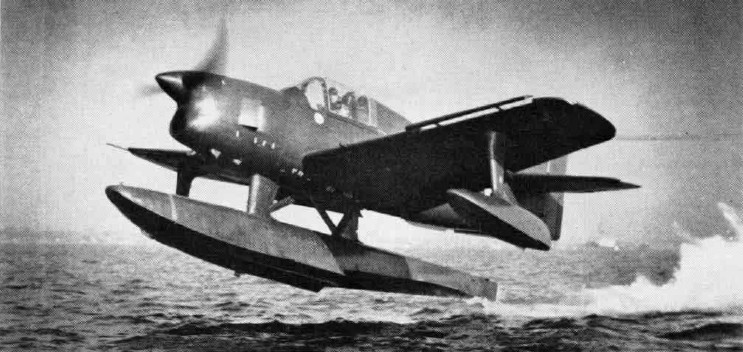

General information
- Type: Single-seat multirole floatplane
- National origin: United States
- Manufacturer: Edo Aircraft Corporation
- Number built: 10

History
- First flight: 1946

The Edo OSE was a 1940s American single-seat multi-role floatplane designed and manufactured by the Edo Aircraft Corporation.

== Design and development ==
The Edo Aircraft Corporation was an established company that produced seaplane floats. In 1946, Edo designed its first aircraft, the Edo OSE. Two prototype aircraft (designated XOSE-1) were built and flown in 1946. The XOSE-1 was a single-seat low-wing cantilever monoplane with a single float and fixed wingtip stabilizing floats. The wings could be folded for shipboard storage. The aircraft was designed for a variety of roles including observation and anti-submarine patrols. Unusually, it was designed to carry a rescue cell on the underwing hardpoints, which would be capable of carrying a single person when used for air-sea rescue. Eight production aircraft (designated XOSE-1) were built to a United States Navy order but none were accepted into service. A two-seat training conversion was carried out as the XTE-1, but production TE-2 aircraft were cancelled.

== Variants ==
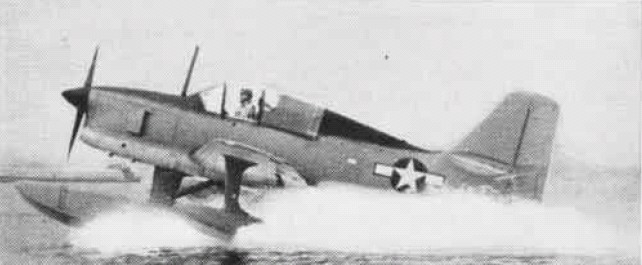
Edo XOSE-1 taking off

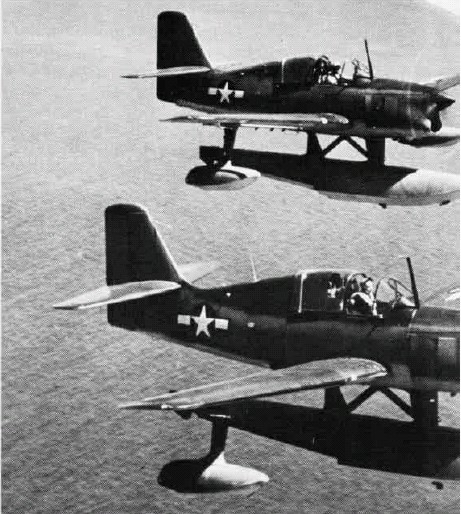
Edo XOSE-1s

XS2E-1
Original designation for OSE and TE single seat floatplane scouts.
XOSE-1
Prototypes and production single-seat aircraft redesignated from XS2E-1; eight built.
XOSE-2
Prototype two-seat floatplane scout aircraft, two converted from XOSE-1.
OSE-2
Production two-seat floatplane scout aircraft, four aircraft were assigned Bureau of Aeronautics numbers (BuNos.), but production was cancelled.
XSO2E-1
Original designation for XTE-1 conversions.
XTE-1
Two-seat floatplane trainer conversions, two aircraft converted from the XOSE-1 prototypes.
TE-2
Developed from the TE-1, four aircraft were assigned BuNos., but production was cancelled.

== Specifications (XOSE-1) ==
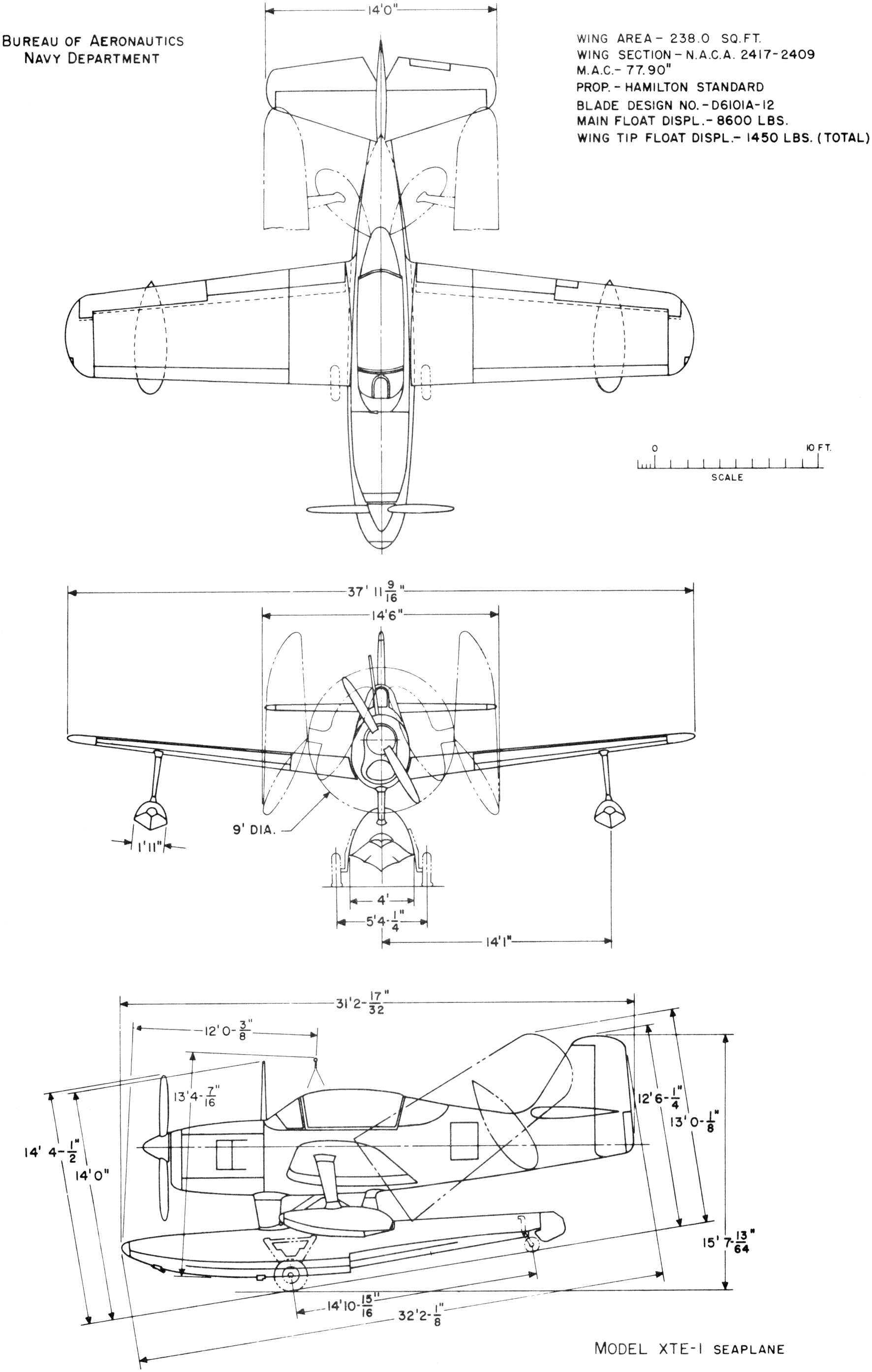
3-view line drawing of the Edo XTE-1

Data from Jane's all the World's Aircraft 1947, Aerofiles

General characteristics

- Crew: 1
- Length: 31 ft 0 in (9.45 m)
- Wingspan: 38 ft 0 in (11.57 m)
- Width: 14 ft 6 in (4.42 m) folded
- Height: 14 ft 11 in (4.55 m) wings spread; 4.16 m (13.6 ft) wings folded
- Wing area: 237 sq ft (22.0 m^{2})
- Airfoil: root:NACA 2417; tip: NACA 2409
- Empty weight: 3,973 lb (1,802 kg)
- Gross weight: 6,064 lb (2,751 kg)
- Powerplant: 1 × Ranger V-770-8 V-12 inverted air-cooled piston engine, 550 hp (410 kW)
- Propellers: 2-bladed Hamilton Standard D601a-12, 9 ft 0 in (2.74 m) diameter constant speed airscrew

Performance

- Maximum speed: 198 mph (319 km/h, 172 kn)
- Range: 900 mi (1,400 km, 780 nmi)
- Service ceiling: 22,300 ft (6,800 m)

Armament

- Guns: 2x fixed forward-firing wing-mounted 0.5in (12.7mm) machine-guns
- Bombs: 2x 350 lb (160 kg) bombs / depth charges / rescue pods

== See also ==
Aircraft of comparable role, configuration, and era

- Arado Ar 196
- Curtiss SC Seahawk
- Vought OS2U Kingfisher

Related lists

- List of United States Navy aircraft designations (pre-1962)
- List of flying boats and floatplanes
