= Vought OS2U Kingfisher =

Observation floatplane (in service 1938-59)

OS2U Kingfisher
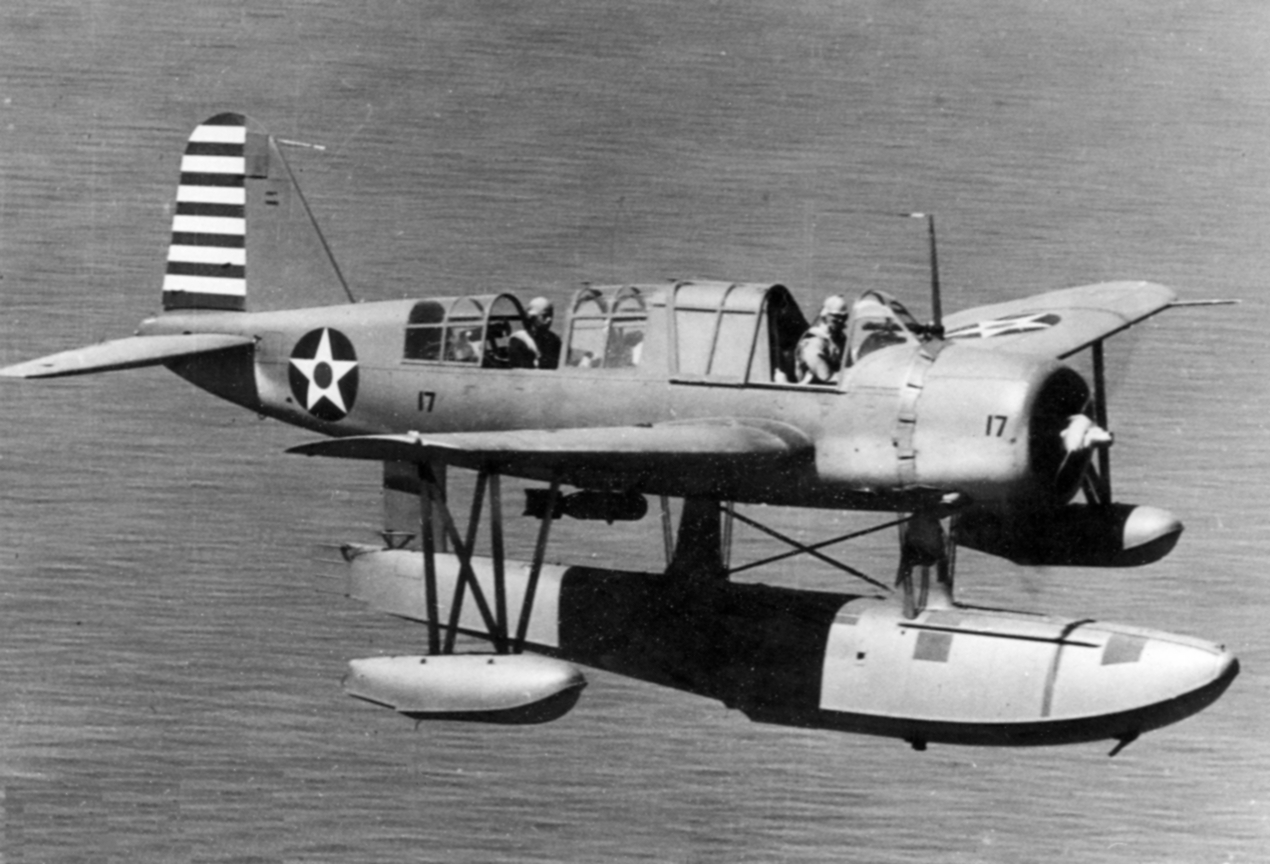

General information
- Type: Observation floatplane
- Manufacturer: Vought
- Primary users: United States Navy Royal Navy; Royal Australian Air Force; Soviet Navy
- Number built: 1,519

History
- First flight: 20 July 1938
- Retired: 1959 (Cuba)

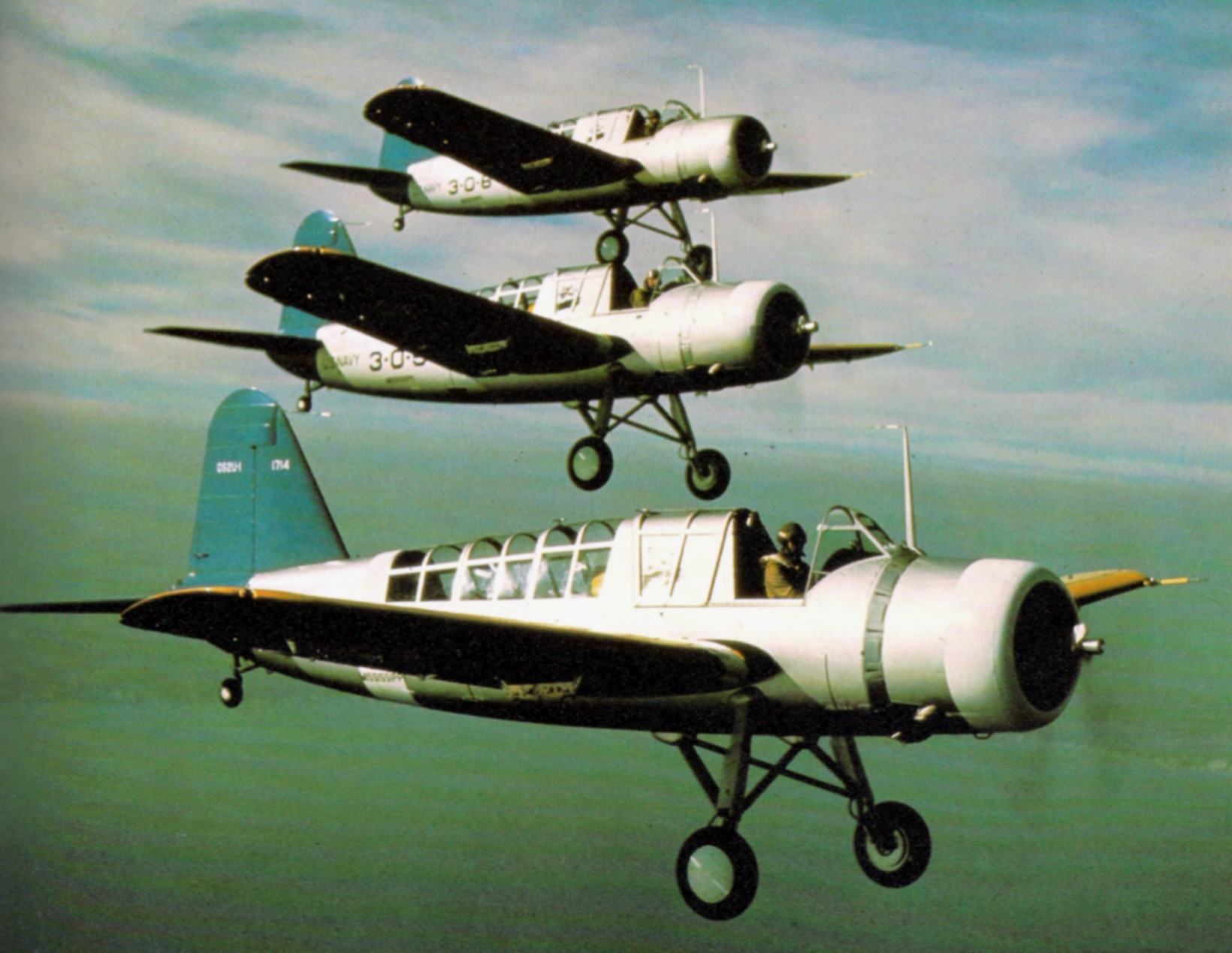
OS2U with landing gear

The Vought OS2U Kingfisher is a catapult-launched observation floatplane designed and produced by the American aviation company Vought. It was the primary shipboard observation seaplane operated by the United States Navy (USN) during World War II,

Designed as a successor to biplane observation aircraft then in use with the USN, the Kingfisher was a compact mid-wing monoplane furnished with a large central float and compact stabilizing floats. In addition to the standard float arrangement, it could also be furnished with wheeled, taildragger landing gear. The Kingfisher was the first aircraft to use spot welding in its manufacture, which produced a smooth fuselage resistant to buckling and resulted in lower-than-average drag for the era. It was typically outfitted with a Pratt & Whitney R-985 Wasp Junior radial engine. The Naval Aircraft Factory OS2N was the designation of the OS2U-3 aircraft built by the Naval Aircraft Factory in Philadelphia, Pennsylvania. An initial prototype was ordered by the USN on 22 March 1937 and performed its maiden flight on 22 July 1938. The Kingfisher was commonly noted for its favourable performance at low speeds, which was a product of its use of high-lift devices and spoilers, as well as its relatively low drag.

First delivered to the USN in early 1940, the Kingfisher was commonly flown from the service's capital ships to support activities such as shore bombardments and air-sea rescue. Throughout World War II, the type was primarily used in the Pacific Theatres. It remained in frontline use throughout the conflict, with its replacement only beginning to enter service in 1944. Various other operators also flew the Kingfisher, including the United States Marine Corps (USMC) in Marine Scouting Squadron Three (VMS-3), and the United States Coast Guard (USCG) across its coastal air stations. Overseas operators of the OS2U included the Fleet Air Arm (FAA) of the Royal Navy, the Royal Australian Air Force (RAAF), and the Soviet Naval Aviation. Several of these nations were supplied the type under the Lend-Lease program.

== Design and development ==
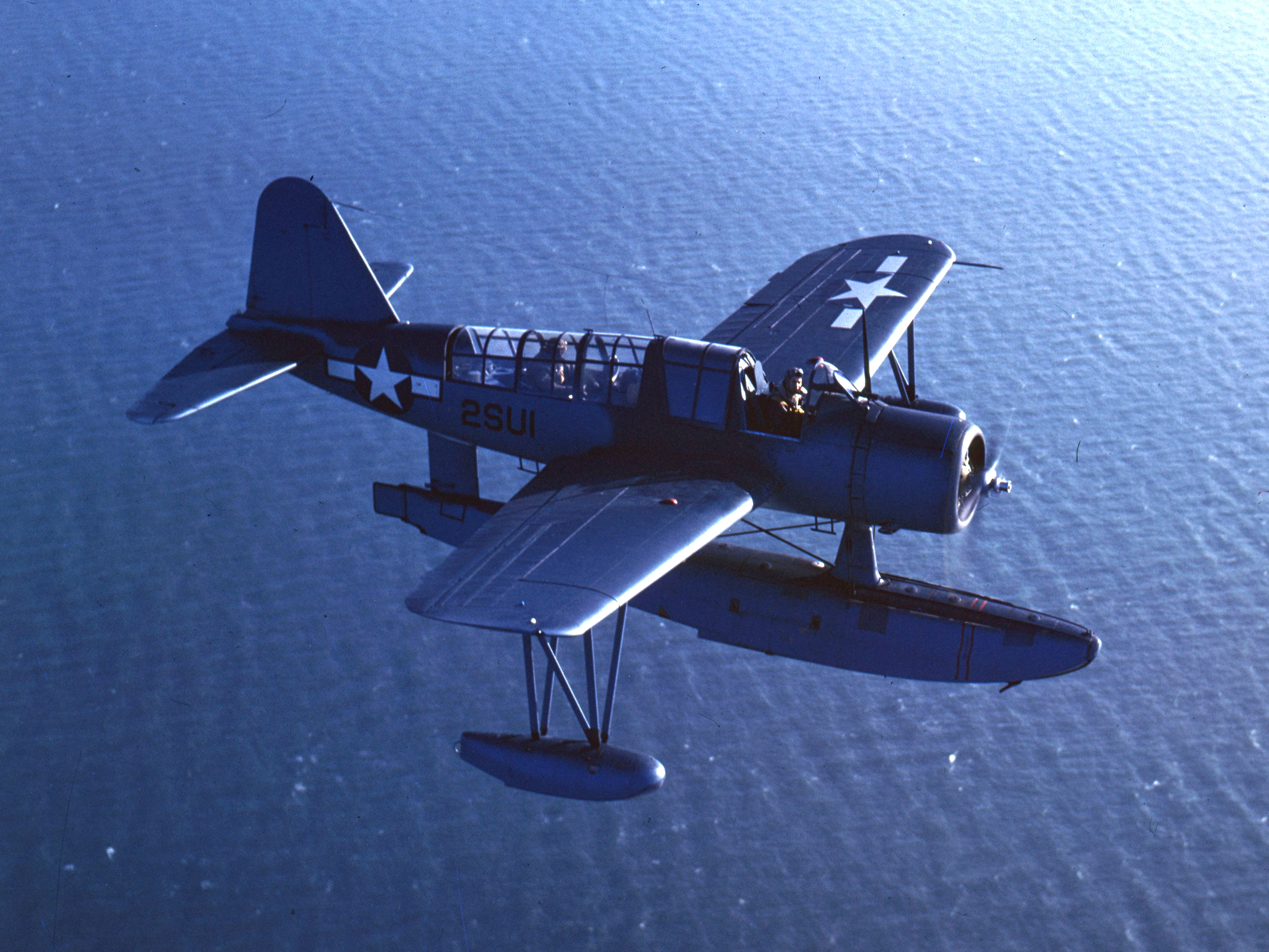
OS2U Kingfisher in 1944

In the late 1930s, Vought engineer Rex Beisel was tasked with designing an observation monoplane aircraft for the United States Navy (USN) suitable for numerous tasks, including directing battleship fire. Numerous engineering challenges were present in designing an appropriate aircraft for this role, including an upper weight limit imposed by the need to be catapult-launched, a restriction on wing span due to shipboard space constaints, and possess sufficient range while carrying various apparatus for the mission role, such as a radio, cameras, and the ability to land on the open seas under inclimate conditions.

In order to successfully replace the then-standard biplane observation aircraft with a more modern monoplane configuration, Beisel incorporated several innovations into the design. The aircraft would be the first production type to use spot welding in its manufacture, a process that Vought and the Naval Aircraft Factory had jointly developed to create a smooth fuselage that resisted buckling and generated less drag. Beisel also introduced high-lift devices and spoilers. In a unique arrangement, deflector plate flaps and drooping ailerons were located on the trailing edge of the wing to increase the camber of the wing and thus create additional lift.

The wings, which had a relatively straight leading edge and forward-swept trailing edge, featured a relatively high dihedral angle. As a weight-saving measure, Beisel opted for a fabric covering for the wings with fabric aft of the primary spar. The horizontal tail plane was relatively wide and tapered. To enable the aircraft to optimally perform the observation function, it was furnished with a large glazed cockpit enclosure. While designed primarily to perform the observation mission, the aircraft was suitable for various other roles, including tactical bombing and utility functions, such as the towing of aerial gunnery targets and the pursuit of practice torpedoes. Additionally, the aircraft could be used as a trainer in both its floatplane and landplane configurations.

Various armaments could be carried by the aircraft. The pilot was provisioned with a 0.30 in (7.62 mm) Browning M1919 machine gun, the receiver for which was mounted in a relatively low position in the right front cockpit and fired between the engine cylinder heads. The radio operator/gunner manned another 0.30 in (7.62 mm) machine gun (or a pair) on a flexible Scarff ring mount. The aircraft could also carry either a pair of 100 lb (45 kg) bombs or two 325 lb (147 kg) depth charges to combat enemy submarines.

On 22 March 1937, the USN issued a contract to Vought to produce a single prototype, designated XOS2U-1. This prototype, which was powered by an air-cooled, 450 hp (340 kW) Pratt & Whitney R-985-4 Wasp Junior radial engine, made its maiden flight on 20 July 1938. Pilots reported that the aircraft handled relatively well at slow speeds, which was a product of its innovative flight control features. The first production standard aircraft, which was designated OS2U-1, was delivered in early 1940.

The definitive version of the aircraft as the OS2U-3. This model was powered by the Pratt & Whitney R-985 Wasp Junior radial engine and featured greater fuel capacity along with self-sealing fuel tanks and armor to protect its crew. The OS2U-3 was the final production model, which was produced in greater numbers than any other; production of the type ceased in 1942.

== Operational history ==
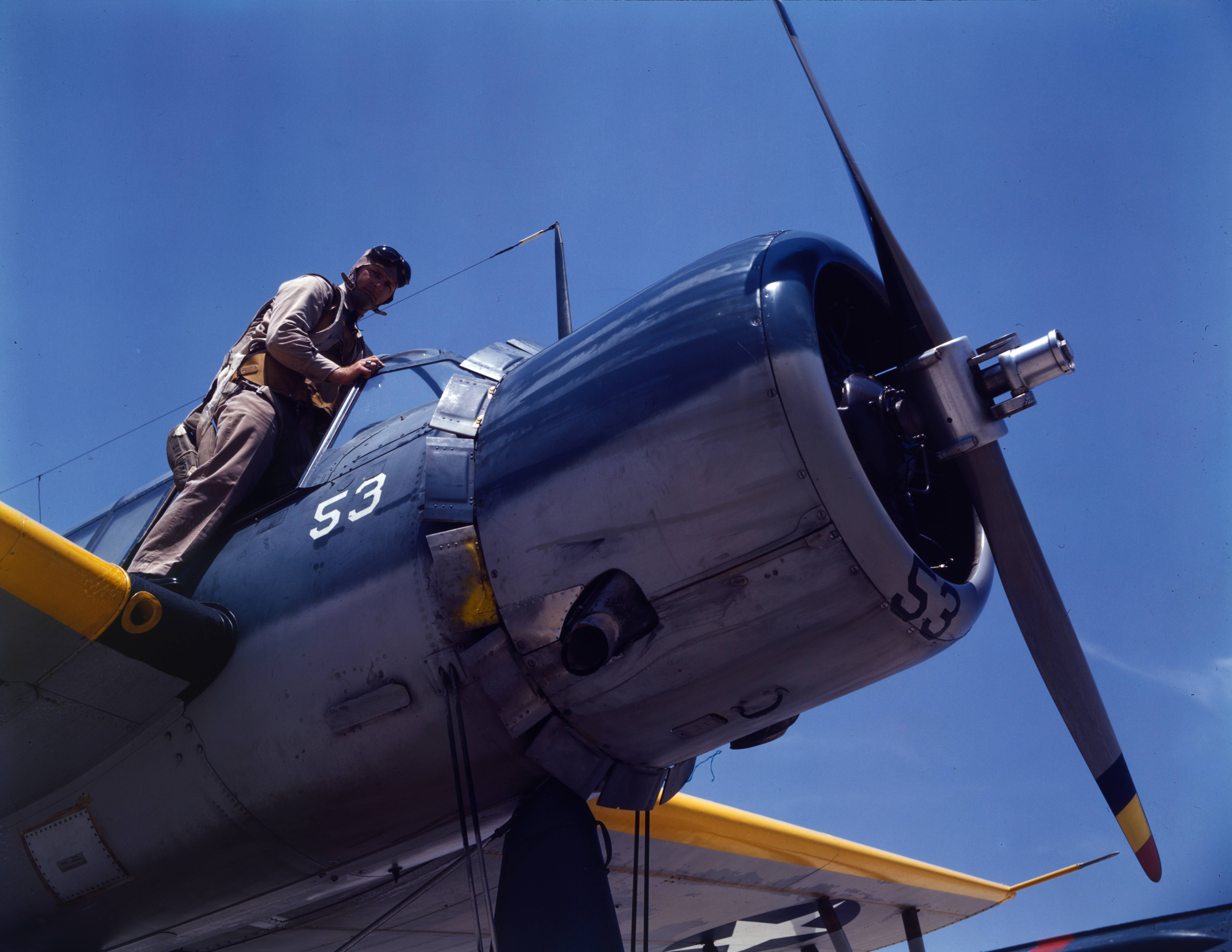
Aviation cadet in OS2U Kingfisher at the Naval Air Base, Corpus Christi, Texas

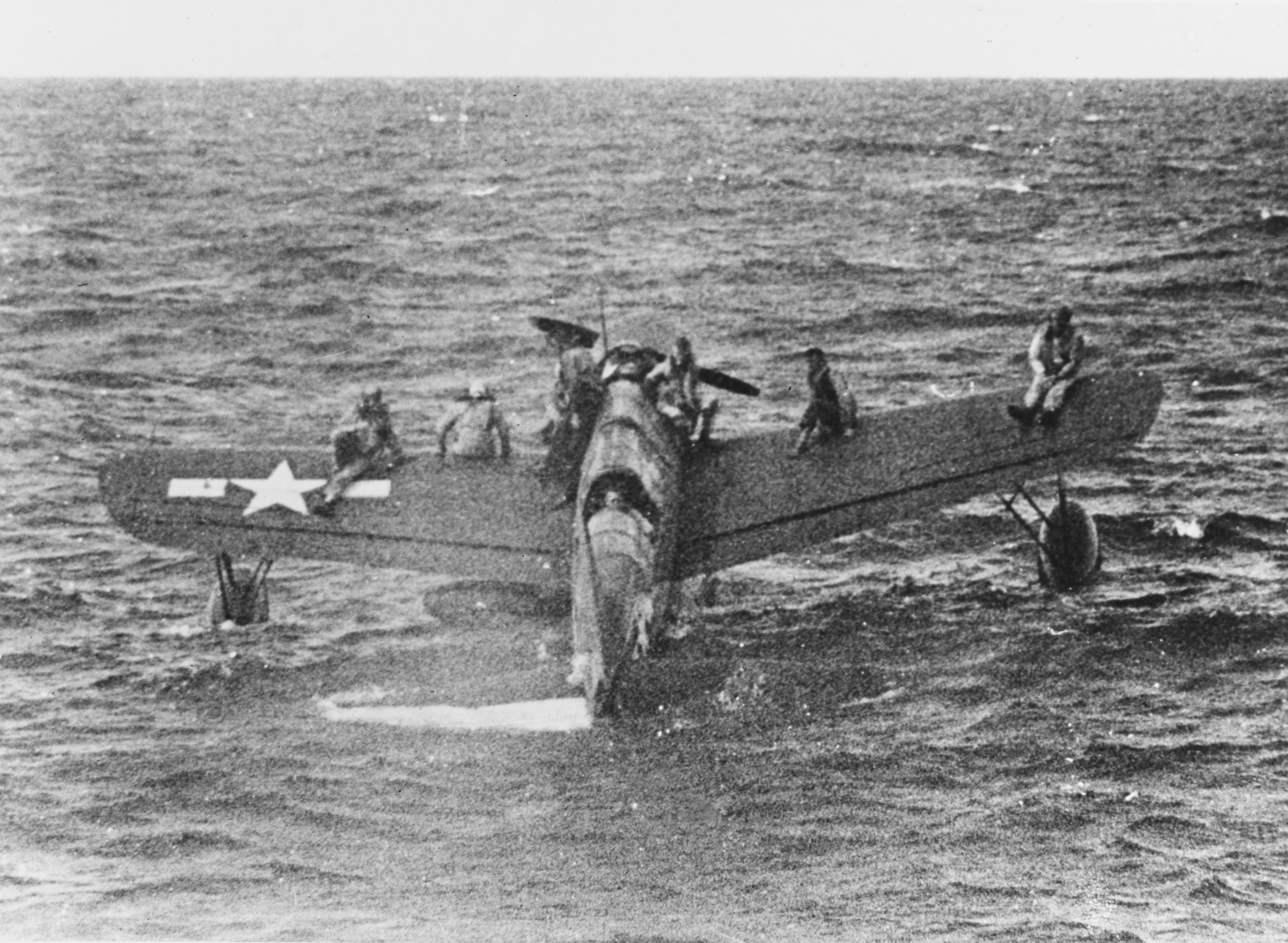
Downed American airmen near Truk await rescue from USS Tang on the wings of an OS2U Kingfisher, 1 May 1944

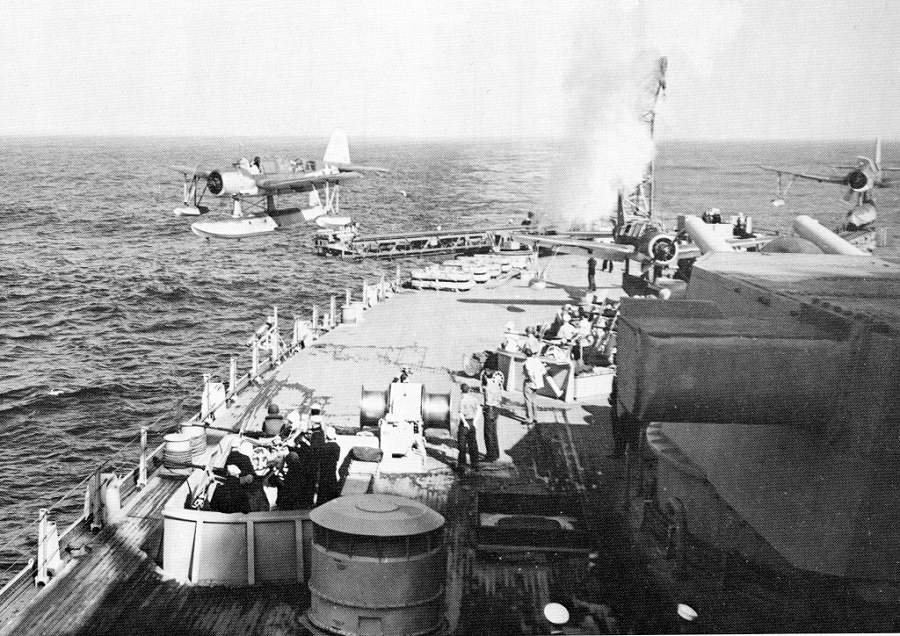
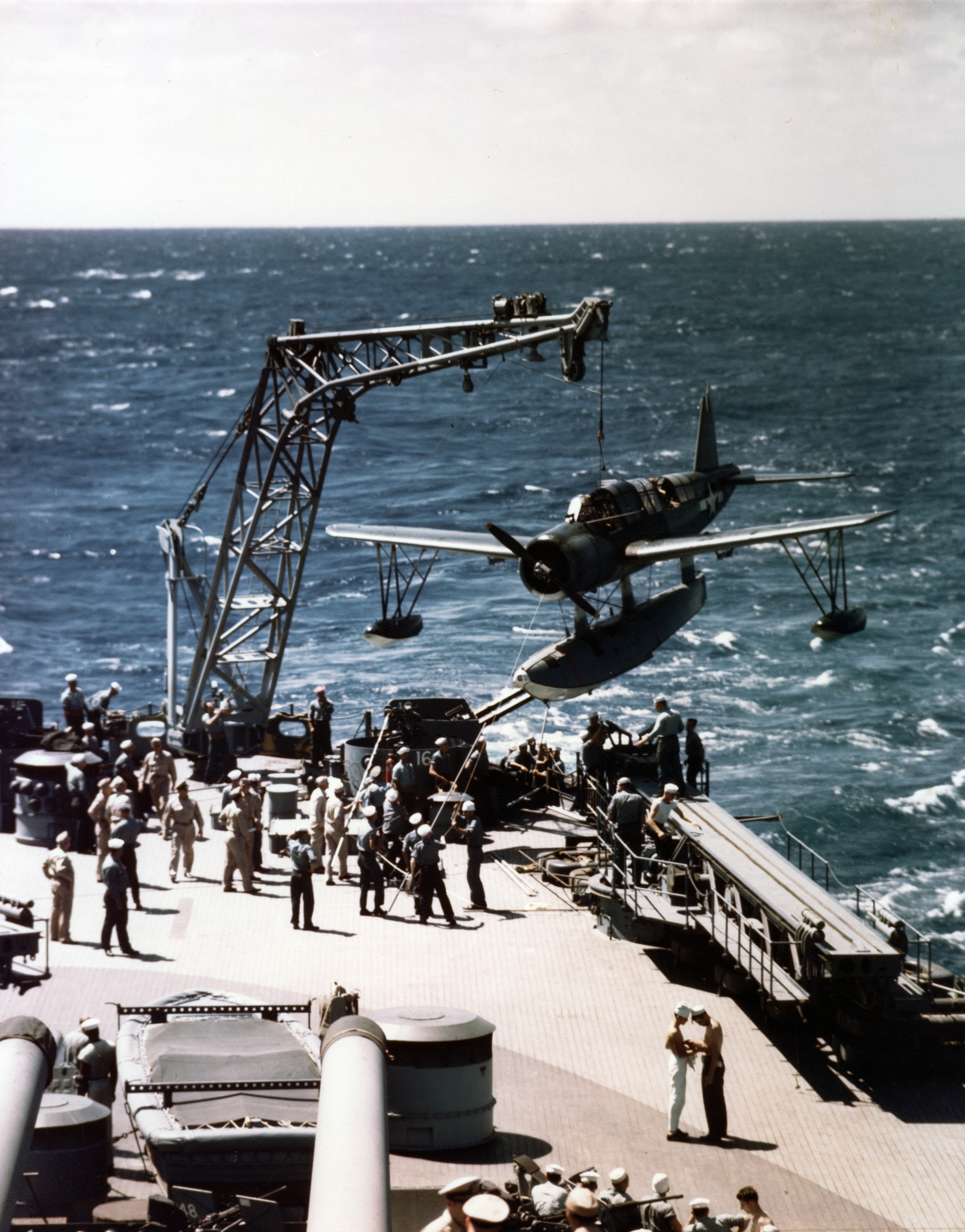
Iowa launches (left) while Missouri recovers (right) Vought OS2U Kingfishers in 1944.

The first 54 Kingfishers were delivered to the USN beginning in August 1940, and six had been assigned to the Pearl Harbor–based Battle Force before the end of the same year. Many of the following 158 OS2U-2s were attached to flight training at Naval Air Station Pensacola, Florida, but 53 were assigned to equip the newly established Inshore Patrol Squadrons, based at Naval Air Station Jacksonville, Florida. In 1942, nine more Inshore Patrol Squadrons were established, all exclusively equipped with OS2N-1s built by the Naval Aircraft Factory.

The Kingfisher was widely used as a shipboard, catapult-launched scout plane on USN battleships, heavy cruisers, and light cruisers and played a major role in support of shore bombardments and air-sea rescue. During World War II, the majority of the USN's Kingfishers were allocated to the Pacific theatre. During the conflict, two examples demonstrated the aircraft's rescue capabilities: the recovery of World War I ace Eddie Rickenbacker and his crew from the Pacific in November 1942, and Lieutenant John A. Burns' unique use of the aircraft on 30 April 1944 to taxi airmen rescued from Truk Lagoon to the submarine Tang, which was serving rescue duty near the atoll. In all, Burns rescued ten survivors on two trips and was awarded the Navy Cross for his efforts.

The United States Coast Guard (USCG) received 76 OS2U-3 Kingfishers starting in 1942 and employed them in anti-submarine warfare, reconnaissance, and search and rescue roles. No USCG Kingfisher has ever been credited with the sinking of an enemy submarine; however, the type was successful in rescuing sailors from ships sunk by enemy torpedoes. The USCG operated the Kingfisher until October 1944.

Australia received 18 Kingfishers from a batch of aircraft ordered by the Dutch East Indies that was diverted to Australia in 1942. They were initially used as training aircraft for pilots destined for flying boats, however, they were used to equip No. 107 Squadron RAAF in 1943, which carried out convoy escort duties until disbanded in October 1945. One Kingfisher was used in support of the Australian National Antarctic Research Expedition between 1947 and 1948.

Throughout its USN service, the OS2U and even its predecessor, the Curtiss SOC Seagull, served much longer than planned, as the planned successor, the Curtiss SO3C Seamew, suffered from an insufficiently powerful engine which was a complete failure. The OS2U was only slowly replaced in the latter stages of World War II with the introduction of the Curtiss SC Seahawk, the first examples of which being delivered to the USN in October 1944.

== Variants ==
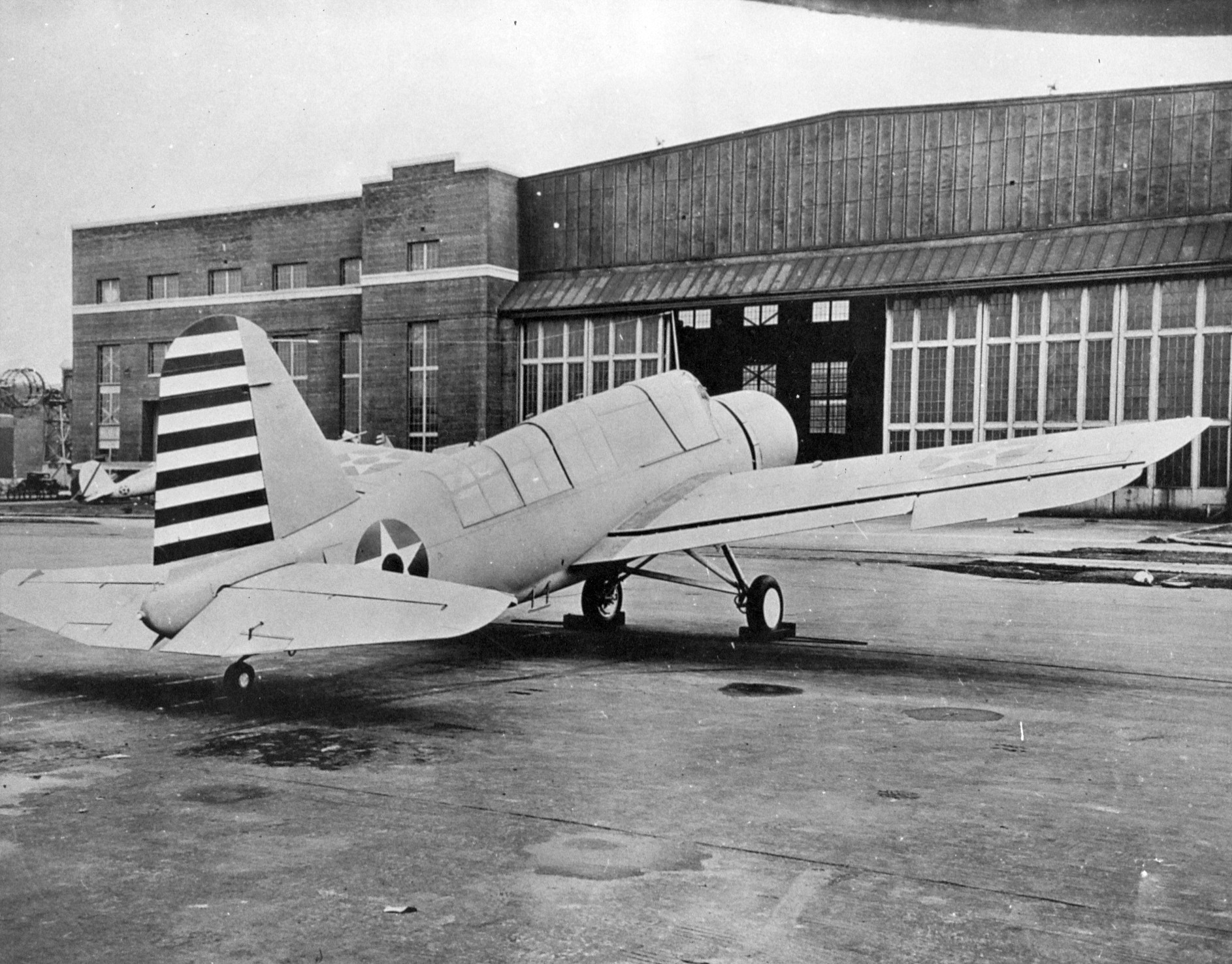
An OS2N-1 at the Naval Aircraft Factory, 1941.

XOS2U-1
Prototype Vought Model VS.310 powered by a 450 hp (336 kW) Pratt & Whitney R-985-4 engine, one built.
OS2U-1
Initial production variant as the prototype but powered by a 450 hp (336 kW) Pratt & Whitney R-985-48, 54 built.
OS2U-2
Production variant with minor equipment changes and powered by a 450 hp (336 kW) Pratt & Whitney R-985-50, 158 built.
OS2U-3
Based on the OS2U-2 with self-sealing fuel tanks, armour protection, two 0.30 in (7.62 mm) guns (dorsal and nose mounted), and able to carry 325 lb (147 kg) of depth charges or 100 lb (45 kg) bombs, powered by a 450 hp (336 kW) Pratt & Whitney R-985-AN2 engine, 1006 built.
OS2U-4
Two aircraft converted with narrow-chord and high-aspect ratio wings, also fitted with full-span flaps. Not developed.
OS2N-1
Naval Aircraft Factory built OS2U-3 with a 450 hp (336 kW) Pratt & Whitney R-985-AN-2 or -AN-8 engine, 300 built.
Kingfisher I
British designation for the OS2U-3, 100 delivered to the Royal Navy.

== Operators ==
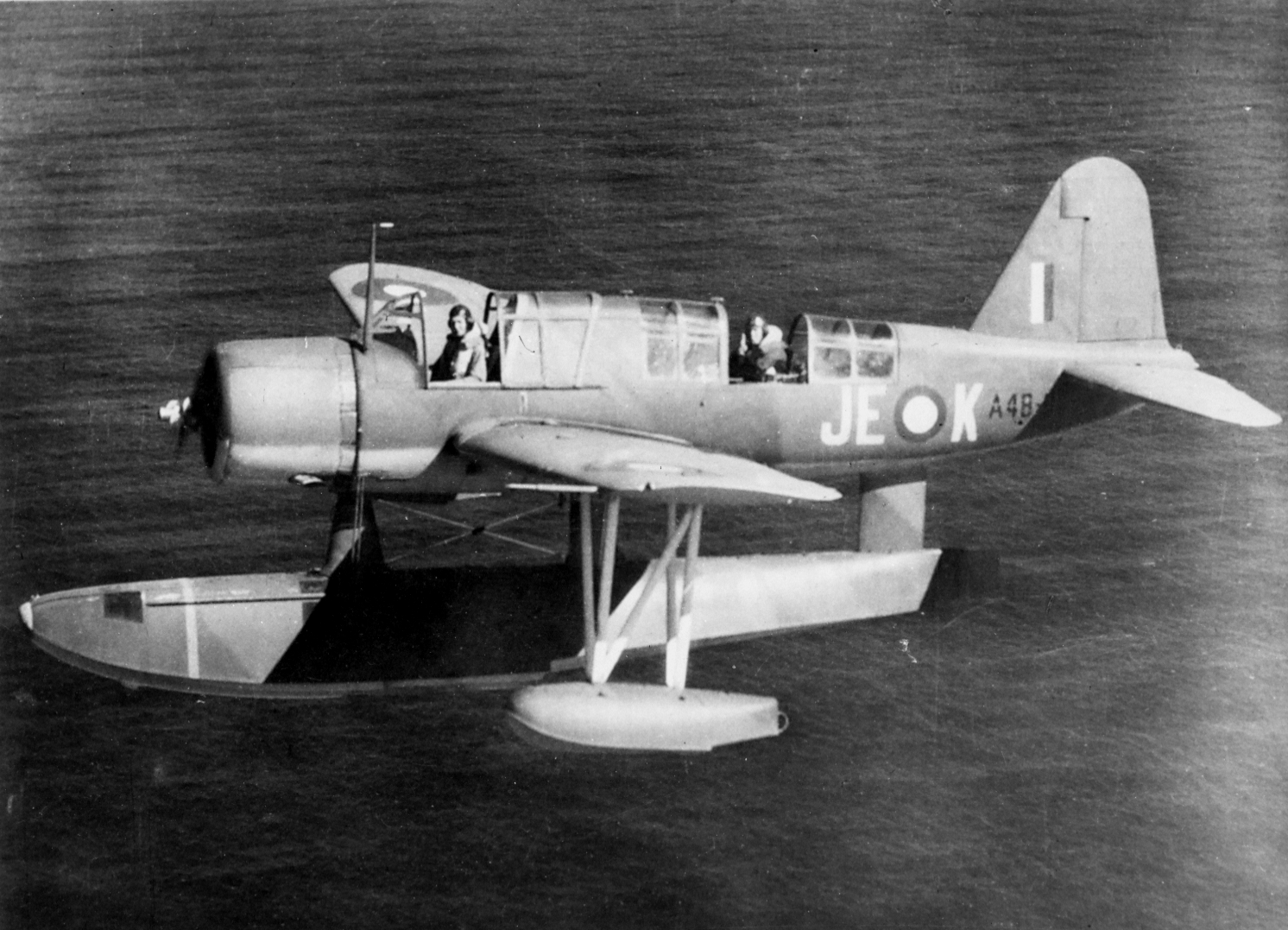
An OS2U of 107 Sqn RAAF.

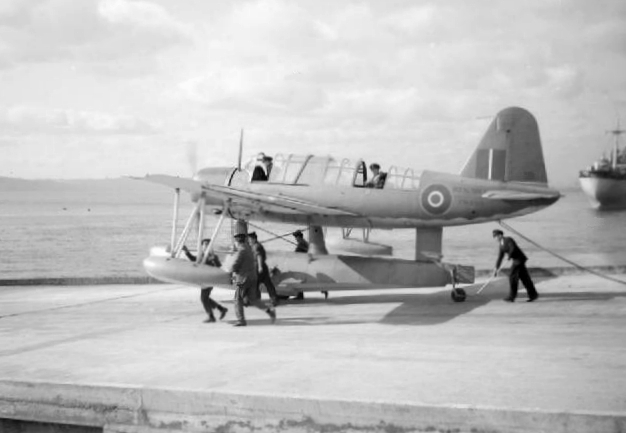
A Fleet Air Arm 778 NAS Kingfisher at Arbroath.

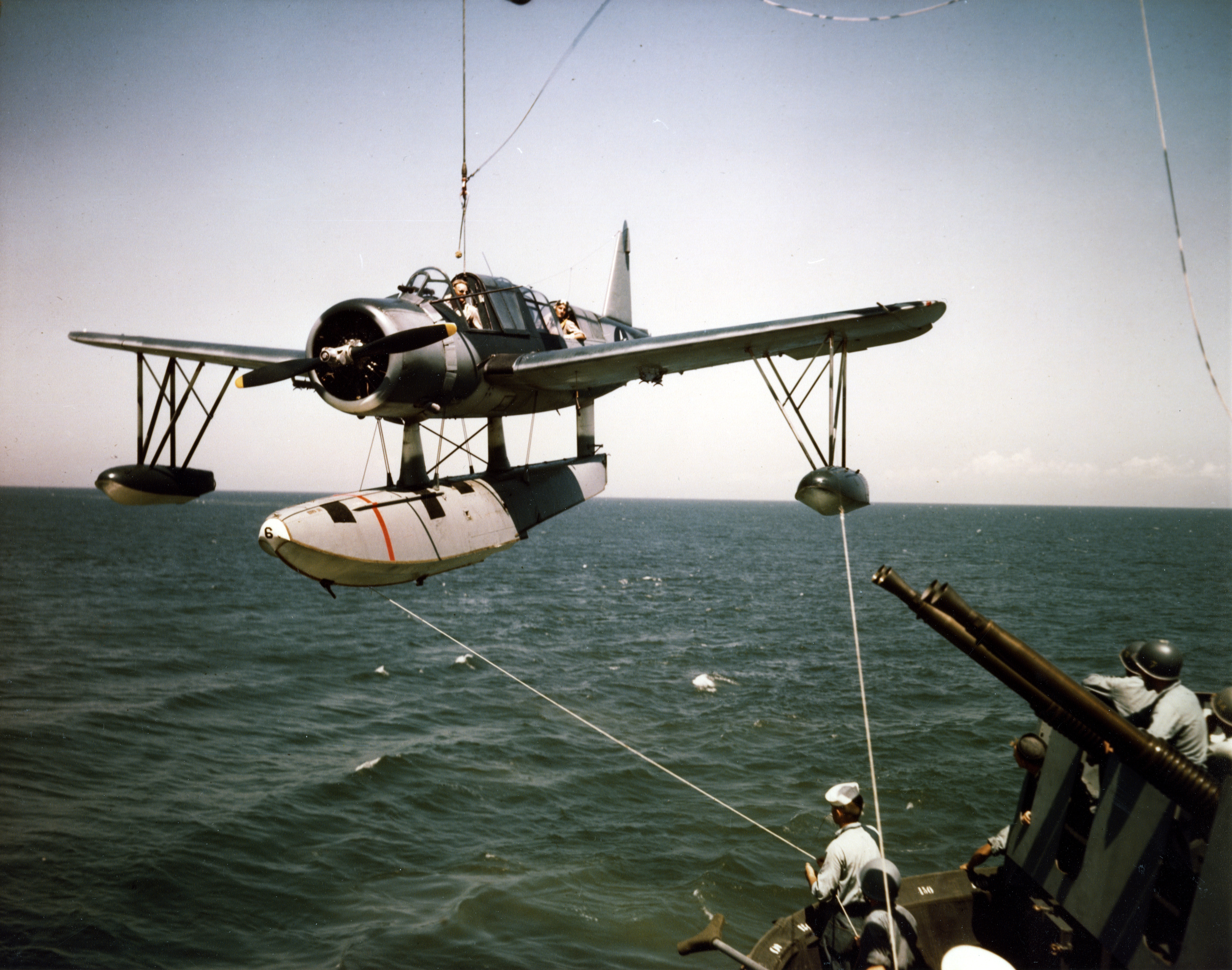
US Navy OS2U hoisted aboard the USS Missouri (BB-63), 1944

Australia

- Royal Australian Air Force
  - No. 107 Squadron RAAF

Chile
15 aircraft, operated 1942–1957
Cuba (Republic of Cuba (1902–1959))
Cuban Naval Aviation
Dominican Republic
(Three aircraft)
Mexico

- Mexican Navy

Six aircraft, 201 Squadron.
Netherlands
24 aircraft, not delivered in time for hostilities.
Soviet Union

- Soviet Naval Aviation

2 aircraft on the ship USS Milwaukee (Murmansk)
United Kingdom

- Fleet Air Arm

Received 100 aircraft.
United States

- United States Navy
- United States Marine Corps
- United States Coast Guard—76 aircraft.

Uruguay

- Uruguayan Navy

Received six OS2U-3s in 1942 to 1959 under Lend Lease.

== Aircraft on display ==
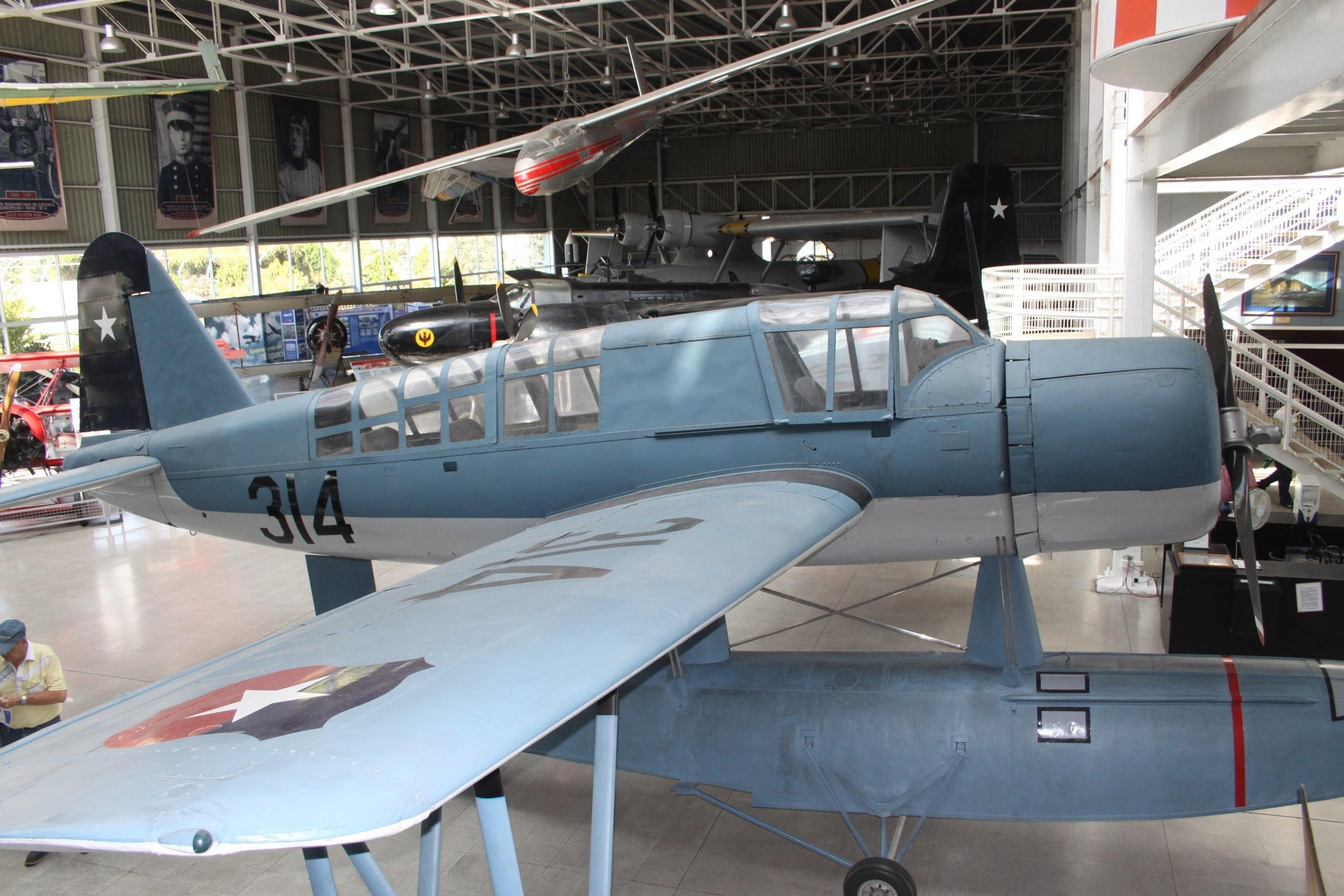
Vought OS2U Kingfisher Chilean Navy.

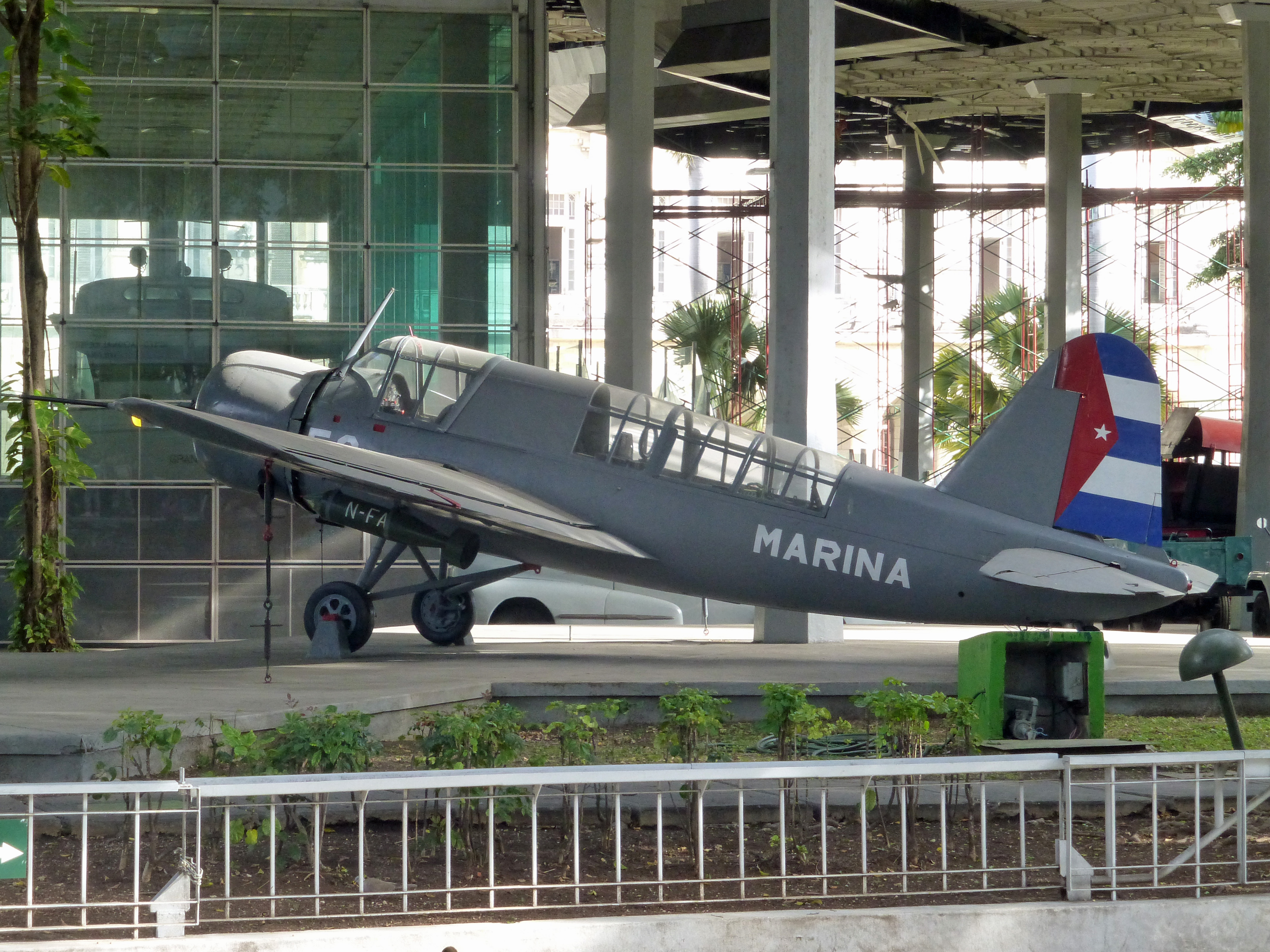
Cuban Vought-Sikorsky Kingfisher.

At least eight Kingfishers survive in collections of historic aircraft around the world.

=== Australia ===
OS2U-3

- 5985 – Whale World, Albany, Western Australia. It is waiting to be restored. Originally built for the Netherlands Navy in the Dutch East Indies, it was transferred to the RAAF in 1942, serving with Seaplane Training Flight (later 3 OTU) and 107 Sqn before being sold as war surplus in 1945. Now with Pioneer Aero Ardmore New Zealand for restoration, see below.

=== Chile ===
OS2U-3

- 5925 – Museo Nacional Aeronáutico y del Espacio, Santiago.

=== Cuba ===
OS2U-3

- 09650 (marked #50) – Museum of the Revolution (Museo de la Revolución), Havana, Cuba. It is fitted with fixed landing gear rather than a float.

=== New Zealand ===
OS2U-3

- 5985 – Pioneer Aero, Auckland, New Zealand.Originally built for Netherlands Navy in Dutch East Indies, it was transferred to the RAAF in 1942, serving with Seaplane Training Flight (later 3 OTU) and 107 Sqn before being sold as war surplus in 1945. Awaiting restoration in 2015, current status unknown.
- 5982- Pioneer Aero, Auckland, New Zealand. In storage awaiting future restoration in 2015, current status unknown.

=== United States ===
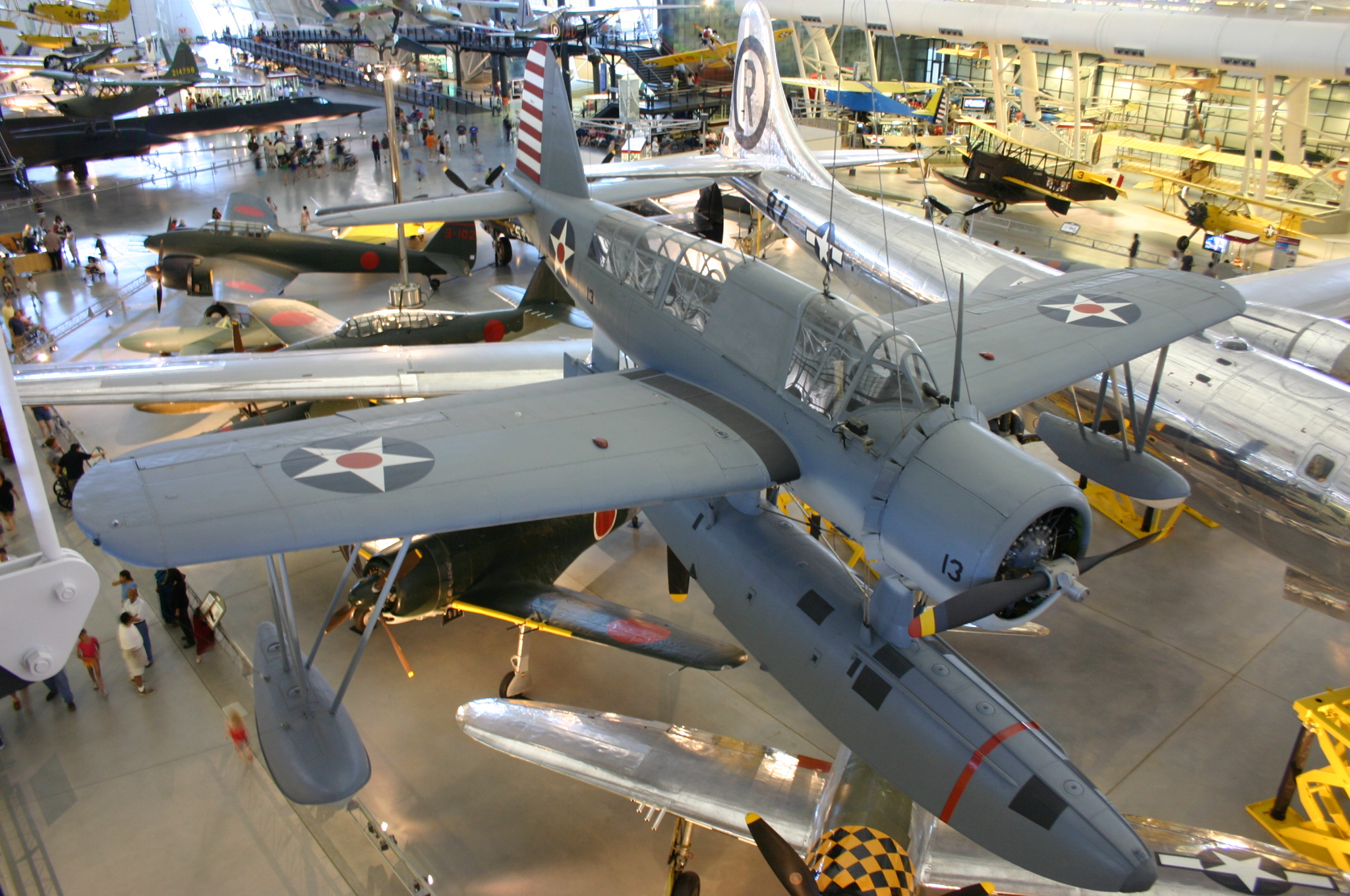
OS2U Kingfisher at the Steven F. Udvar-Hazy Center.

On display
OS2U-3

- 1368 (marked #60, painted as 0951) – Obtained from Mexico, the aircraft was previously displayed aboard the battleship Alabama and is now displayed inside the aircraft pavilion adjacent to the battleship in Mobile, Alabama. The building and the aircraft sustained some damage from Hurricane Katrina in 2005.
- 5909 – Boeing Aviation Hangar at the Steven F. Udvar-Hazy Center, National Air and Space Museum at Dulles International Airport outside of Washington, DC.

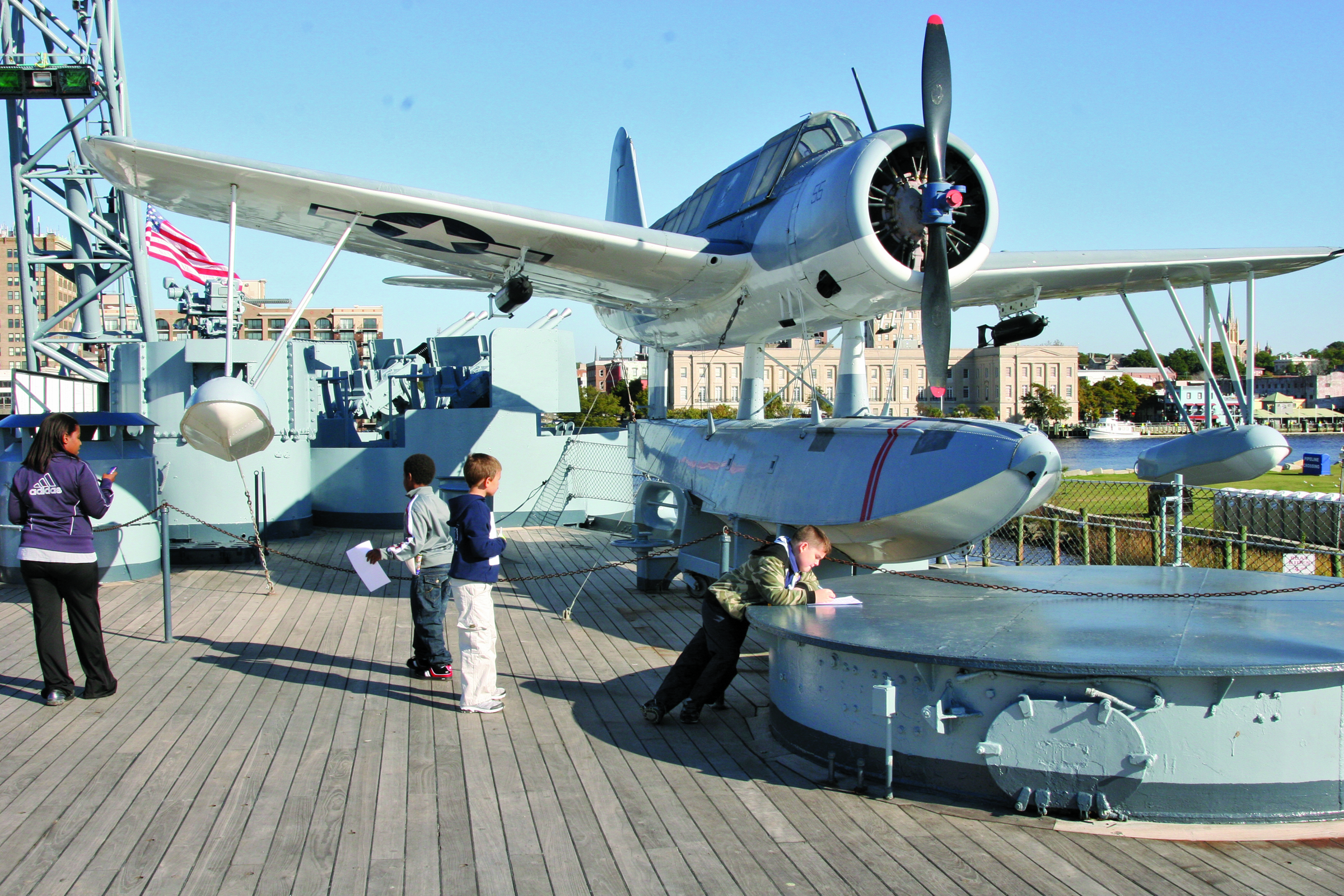
Kingfisher donated by Lynn Garrison to North Carolina Battleship Commission

- 5926 – National Naval Aviation Museum at NAS Pensacola, Florida. It was one of six OS2U-3 Kingfishers that were transferred by Lend-Lease to the National Navy of Uruguay during World War II. This aircraft operated as a seaplane until 1958 and was obtained in 1971.

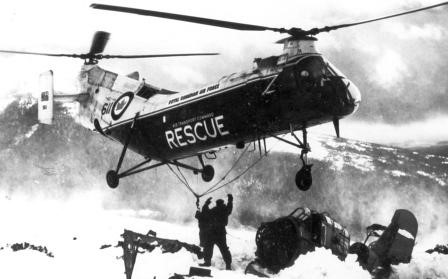
Lynn Garrison salvaged Vought Kingfisher from Calvert Island, British Columbia, February, 1965

- 3073 (marked #8 based on assigned air group) – On board the battleship North Carolina in Wilmington, North Carolina. With the assistance of a Royal Canadian Air Force Piasecki helicopter, Lynn Garrison salvaged this Kingfisher from Calvert Island (British Columbia), during the winter of 1963. It crashed there on a ferry flight to Alaska during World War II. It was initially restored for display by volunteers at Vought Aeronautics in Grand Prairie, Texas and sent to the battleship in 1971. The 2018 restoration of the Kingfisher was managed by a Wilmington resident and the Carolina Chapter of the Flight Deck Veterans Group.

In storage
OS2U-3

- 09643 – In storage at the Yanks Air Museum, Chino, California.

== Specifications (OS2U-3) ==
Data from Jane's Fighting aircraft of World War II

General characteristics

- Crew: 2
- Length: 33 ft 7.2 in (10.241 m)
- Wingspan: 35 ft 10.7 in (10.940 m)
- Height: 14 ft 8 in (4.47 m)
- Wing area: 261.9 sq ft (24.33 m^{2})
- Airfoil: root: NACA 23015; tip: NACA 23009
- Empty weight: 3,335 lb (1,513 kg)
- Gross weight: 4,980 lb (2,259 kg)
- Max takeoff weight: 6,000 lb (2,722 kg)
- Fuel capacity: 144 US gal (120 imp gal; 545 L) in an integral wing tank
- Powerplant: 1 × Pratt & Whitney R-985-AN2 Wasp Junior nine-cylinder air-cooled radial piston engine, 450 hp (340 kW) for take-off

400 hp (300 kW) at 5,000 ft (1,500 m)

- Propellers: 2-bladed Hamilton Standard constant-speed propeller

Performance

- Maximum speed: 171 mph (275 km/h, 149 kn) at 5,000 ft (1,500 m)
- Cruise speed: 152 mph (245 km/h, 132 kn) with 75% power at 6,000 ft (1,800 m)
- Landing speed: 55 mph (48 kn; 89 km/h)
- Range: 908 mi (1,461 km, 789 nmi) with 75% power at 6,000 ft (1,800 m)
- Service ceiling: 18,200 ft (5,500 m)
- Rate of climb: 960 ft/min (4.9 m/s) at 4,000 ft (1,200 m)
- Wing loading: 19 lb/sq ft (93 kg/m^{2})
- Power/mass: 0.08 hp/lb (0.13 kW/kg)

Armament

- Guns: One fixed, forward firing .30 in (7.62 mm) M1919 Browning machine gun with 500 rounds and one .30 in (7.62 mm) M1919 Browning machine gun with 600 rounds, flexibly mounted for the observer.
- Bombs: 650 lb (295 kg) of bombs or depth charges.

== See also ==
Aircraft of comparable role, configuration, and era

- Aichi E13A
- Arado Ar 196
- Curtiss SOC Seagull
- Curtiss SO3C Seamew
- Curtiss SC Seahawk
- IMAM Ro.43
- Mitsubishi F1M
- Edo OSE
- Stearman XOSS

Related lists

- List of aircraft of World War II
