= Flying bomb =

Self-propelled aerial weapon

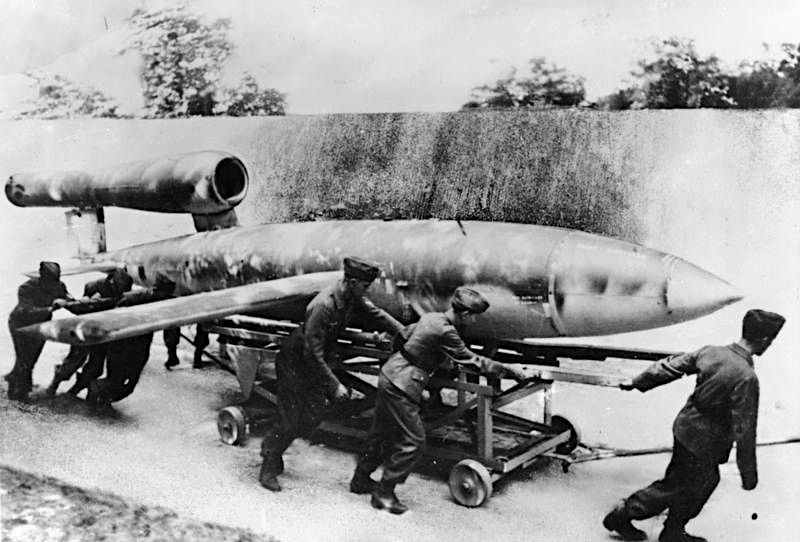
V-1 flying bomb

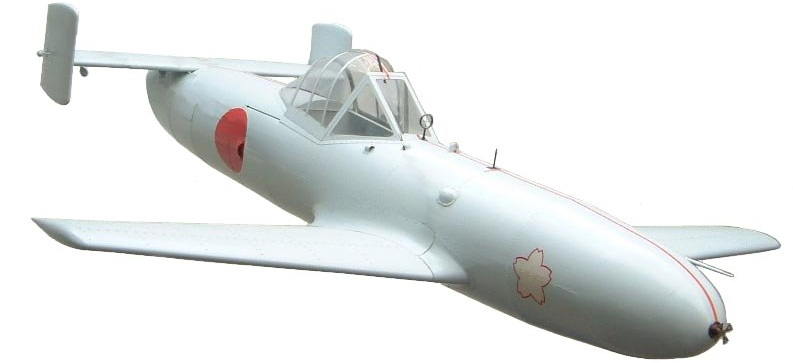
Yokosuka MXY-7 Ohka

A flying bomb is a manned or unmanned aerial vehicle or aircraft carrying a large explosive warhead, a precursor to contemporary cruise missiles. In contrast to a bomber aircraft, which is intended to release bombs and then return to its base for re-use, a flying bomb crashes into its target and is therefore destroyed in its attack.

The term flying bomb is most frequently associated with two specific Second World War weapons, the German V-1 and the Japanese Ohka. The former was unpiloted, as the first known cruise missile ever deployed in combat; the latter carried a pilot on a kamikaze mission.

== Historic exemplars ==
The Sphere of March 13, 1915 published an article on "The Possibilities of an Aerial Torpedo Controlled by Wireless", suggested by a "correspondent to the Sphere" and declared feasible by an "aviation expert".

The first attempt to build a flying bomb (alternatively called an "aerial torpedo" in the Navy) was undertaken by Elmer Sperry for the US Navy in 1916, called the Hewitt-Sperry Automatic Airplane, and was based on a Curtiss N-9 seaplane. This led to a mission-specific Curtiss design, the Curtiss-Sperry Flying Bomb, which was almost completely unsuccessful. The US Army also tried to develop a flying bomb in World War I, the Kettering Bug, but the war ended before the program could mature. The functioning but unsuccessful German Mistel flying bomb was essentially an enormous shaped charge mounted on a repurposed twin-engined medium bomber's airframe (most often a Junkers Ju 88) in place of the cockpit, that was guided by a fighter sitting on top. The fighter first took a course towards the target, then released the Mistel which would continue to its target. The best known example of a flying bomb is the German V-1, many of which targeted London in 1944 during World War II.

== Types ==
Flying bombs may be powered or unpowered, piloted or unpiloted, although unpowered flying bombs such as the United States Navy Bat and German Hagelkorn ("Hailstone") and Fritz X designed during World War II are usually referred to as glide bombs. Flying bombs are analogous to modern cruise missiles such as the jet-powered Tomahawk and rocket-powered Exocet, in that they are equipped with wings to provide lift over a long distance and generally have engines that operate up until impact. This is significantly different from ballistic missiles, which are launched on a ballistic trajectory and do not rely on lift to reach their targets.

== See also ==
- Aerial torpedo
- Fieseler Fi 103R Reichenberg, the "R IV" version of which was intended to be a piloted flying bomb
- Loitering munition
