= Florence Air & Missile Museum =

- former location
- Established: 1963
- Dissolved: 1997
- Location: Florence, South Carolina, United States
- Coordinates: 34.19648°N 79.727265°W
- Type: Aviation museum
- Founder: Thomas C. Griffin
- Director: Rocky Gannon

The Florence Air & Missile Museum was an aviation museum previously located at the entrance to the Florence Regional Airport, in Florence, South Carolina. The museum closed at the end of 1997.

The airport was originally known as Florence Army Airfield, or more simply as Florence Field, a World War II U.S. Army Air Corps / U.S. Army Air Forces training field for P-39 Airacobra and P-40 Warhawk pursuit aircraft and A-20 Havoc and A-26 Invader attack aircraft. Because of its former military connection and available runways, the military was able to fly in aircraft and leave them at the museum as they were retired from service.

The museum was founded by Thomas C. Griffin and opened on 25 December 1963. After the war, he served as executive director of the Florence Airport.

During the 1950s, 1960s, 1970s and early 1980s, the museum built up a collection of World War II and Cold War era U.S. military aircraft and early 1950s/1960s military space hardware. The museum was located along routes once frequented by travelers between the southeastern and northeastern United States and between Florence and Myrtle Beach, South Carolina, but once Interstate 95 was built, attendance declined. In early 1997, the FAA stated that the land the museum sat on was needed for a new entrance to the airport. The museum closed on 8 October 1997 and much of the collection transferred to the newly established Carolinas Aviation Museum in Charlotte, North Carolina.

== Exhibits ==
- Boeing NTB-47B Stratojet 50-0062
  - Now on display at the Mighty Eighth Air Force Museum in Pooler, Georgia
- Chance Vought Regulus I
  - Now on display at the Carolinas Aviation Museum
- Convair YF-102A Delta Dagger 53-1788
  - Now on display at the Carolinas Aviation Museum
- Douglas BTD-1 Destroyer 04959
  - Undergoing restoration at Museum of Flight at Richard B. Russell Airport, Rome, GA. Relocated from Elmira, New York, Sept, 2015.
- Douglas MGR-1 Honest John
  - Restored at the Carolinas Aviation Museum
- Douglas MGR-1 Honest John
  - Disassembled for restoration at the Carolinas Aviation Museum
- Grumman C-1A Trader 136790
  - Now displayed at the Grissom Air Museum at Grissom Air Reserve Base (former Grissom AFB), Indiana
- Grumman F-11A Tiger 141790
  - Previous gate guard aircraft at the former NAS Glynco, Georgia before transfer to Florence in 1974. Now displayed at the Grissom Air Museum at Grissom Air Reserve Base, Indiana
- Fairchild C-119C Flying Boxcar 50-0128
  - Now displayed near Pope Field on Reilly Rd at Sidewinder St - not the C-119 at nearby 82nd Airborne Division War Memorial Museum
- Lockheed F-104B Starfighter 57-1301
  - Now displayed at the Kansas Cosmosphere and Space Center, Hutchinson, Kansas
- Lockheed NC-121K Constellation 141292
  - This aircraft flew the final USN Constellation mission in 1982 with Tactical Electronic Warfare Squadron 33 (VAQ-33) from NAS Key West, Florida - Front 50' now in a private collection in Charlotte, North Carolina
- Lockheed T-33A 53-6089
  - Now on display at the Darlington, South Carolina Airport
- Martin RB-57A Canberra 52-1459
  - Initially moved to National Warplane Museum, Genesco, New York; noted in Sep 2006 at the Wings of Eagles Discovery Center, Elmira, New York. Confirmed still at Elmira, Sep, 2022.
- Martin TB-61C Matador missile
  - Now in storage at the Carolinas Aviation Museum
- McDonnell F-101F Voodoo 56-0243
  - Now on display at the Carolinas Aviation Museum
- Republic F-84F Thunderstreak 52-6553
  - Moved to Drister Aviation and Space Museum, Amarillo, Texas, then to English Field Air & Space Museum, Tradewind Airport, Amarillo, Texas
- Sikorsky HO4S Chickasaw 125506
  - Now on display at Tyler, Texas
- Sikorsky CH-34A Choctaw 55-4496
  - Now on display at the Carolinas Aviation Museum
- Waco CG-4 – Skeleton
  - Current location unknown; is not the CG-15 skeleton in storage at the Carolinas Aviation Museum
- Boeing KC-97G Stratofreighter 52-2624
  - Parts were used by Don Creason to complete the KC-97G 52-0335, on display at the Carolinas Aviation Museum
- Douglas A-26A Invader 64-17671
  - Remanufactured from 44-35820; scrapped for parts
- Douglas WB-66D Destroyer 53-0431
  - Scrapped
- Grumman HU-16 Albatross 51-7212
  - Sold following museum closure. Currently owned by Margaret S. Dewitt of Corpus Christi, Texas for restoration to flyable condition with civilian registration N10625
- Martin SM-72 Titan I Ballistic Missile 61-4499
  - Scrapped
- North American F-86H Sabre 52-5737
  - Moved to Burlington Township Office Complex, Burlington, New Jersey
- Northrop F-89J Scorpion 53-02646
  - Moved to Friendship Park, Smithfield, Ohio
- Piasecki CH-21B Workhorse 54-4003
  - On display at the American Helicopter Museum and Education Center in West Chester, Pennsylvania
- Ryan AQM-91A Firebee
- Ryan Firebee Model G
- F-101A Simulator
  - In storage at the Carolinas Aviation Museum
- T-28 Simulator
  - In storage at the Carolinas Aviation Museum
- Kaman HH-43A Huskie 58-1833
  - Now on display at the Museum of Flight, Robins Air Force Base, Georgia
- Boeing B-29 Superfortress "Sweet Eloise" (former "Miss Marilyn Gay") 44-70113
  - Now on display at the main gate of Dobbins Air Reserve Base, Georgia
