= Douglas BTD Destroyer =

1943 dive/torpedo bomber model by Douglas

BTD Destroyer
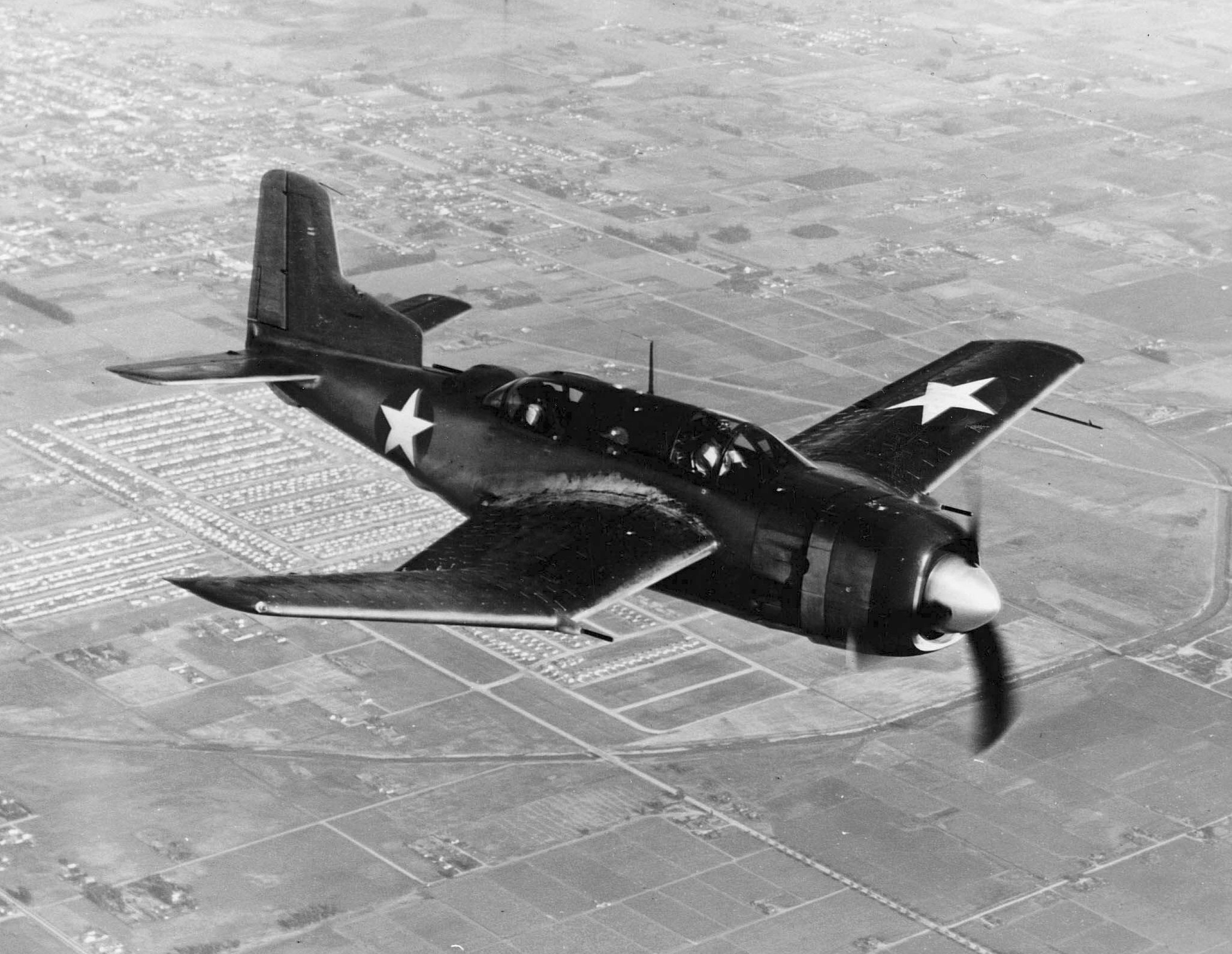
- The XSB2D-1 in 1943

General information
- Type: Dive bomber
- Manufacturer: Douglas Aircraft Corporation
- Primary user: United States Navy
- Number built: 30

History
- Introduction date: 1944
- First flight: 8 April 1943
- Retired: 1945

The Douglas BTD Destroyer is an American dive/torpedo bomber developed for the United States Navy during World War II. A small number had been delivered before the end of the war, but none saw combat.

== Development ==
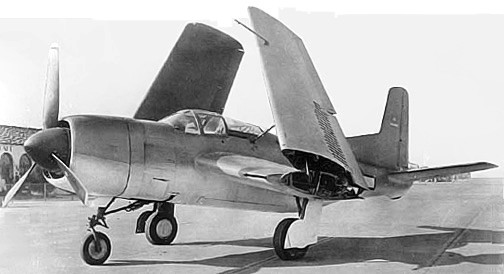
Douglas BTD-1 Destroyer with folded wings

On 20 June 1941, the United States Navy placed an order with the Douglas Aircraft Company for two prototypes of a new two-seat dive bomber to replace both the Douglas SBD Dauntless and the new Curtiss SB2C Helldiver, designated XSB2D-1. The resulting aircraft, designed by a team led by Ed Heinemann, was a large single-engined mid-winged monoplane. It had a laminar flow gull-wing, and unusually for a carrier-based aircraft of the time, a tricycle undercarriage. It was fitted with a bomb bay and underwing racks for up to 4,200 lb (1,900 kg) of bombs or one torpedo (typically the Mark 13), while defensive armament consisted of two wing-mounted 20 mm (0.79 in) cannon and two remote-controlled turrets, each with two .50 in (12.7 mm) machine guns.

The prototype first flew on 8 April 1943, demonstrating good performance, being faster than the Dauntless and capable of carrying more bombload, but it was heavier and more complex. The U.S. Navy had made a request for a new torpedo bomber developed from the XSB2D-1. Douglas reworked the XSB2D-1 by removing the turrets and second crewman, while adding more fuel and armor, while wing racks could carry not just one but two torpedoes, producing the BTD-1 Destroyer. The orders for the SB2D-1 were converted to the BTD-1, with the first BTD-1 flying on 5 March 1944. The BTD-1 was heavier than the XS2BD-1 and had poorer performance. Ed Heinemann asked for cancellation of the BTD-1.

== Operational history ==
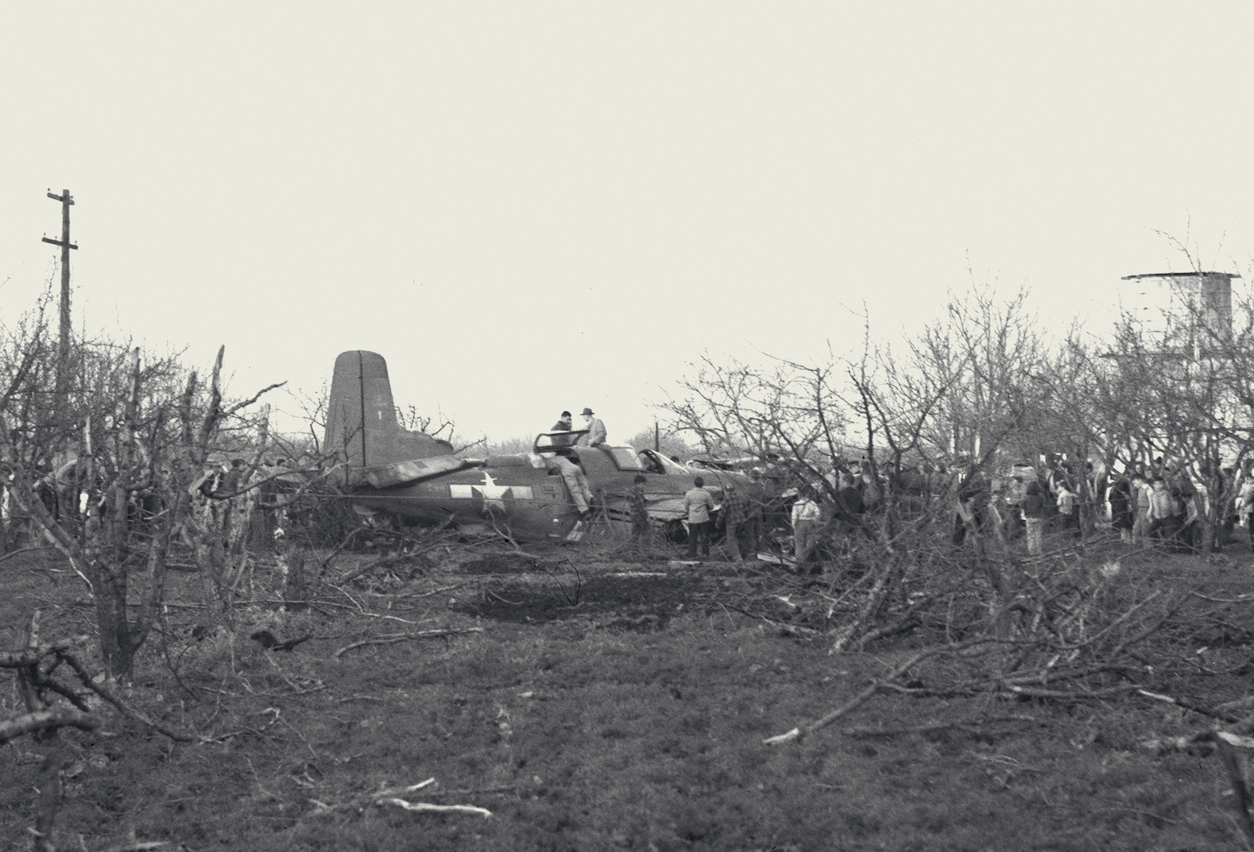
Crash of XSB2D-1 in a Sunnyvale prune orchard, 10 January 1946.

The first production BTD-1s were completed in June 1944. By the time Japan surrendered in August 1945, only 28 aircraft had been delivered, and production was cancelled due to performance, along with other aircraft types that had been designed from the start as single-seaters, such as the Martin AM Mauler. None saw combat. In any event, Heinemann and his team were already working on developing the single-seat BT2D that became the Douglas A-1 Skyraider.

One of the two XSB2Ds was destroyed in a crash on 10 January 1946.

== Variants ==
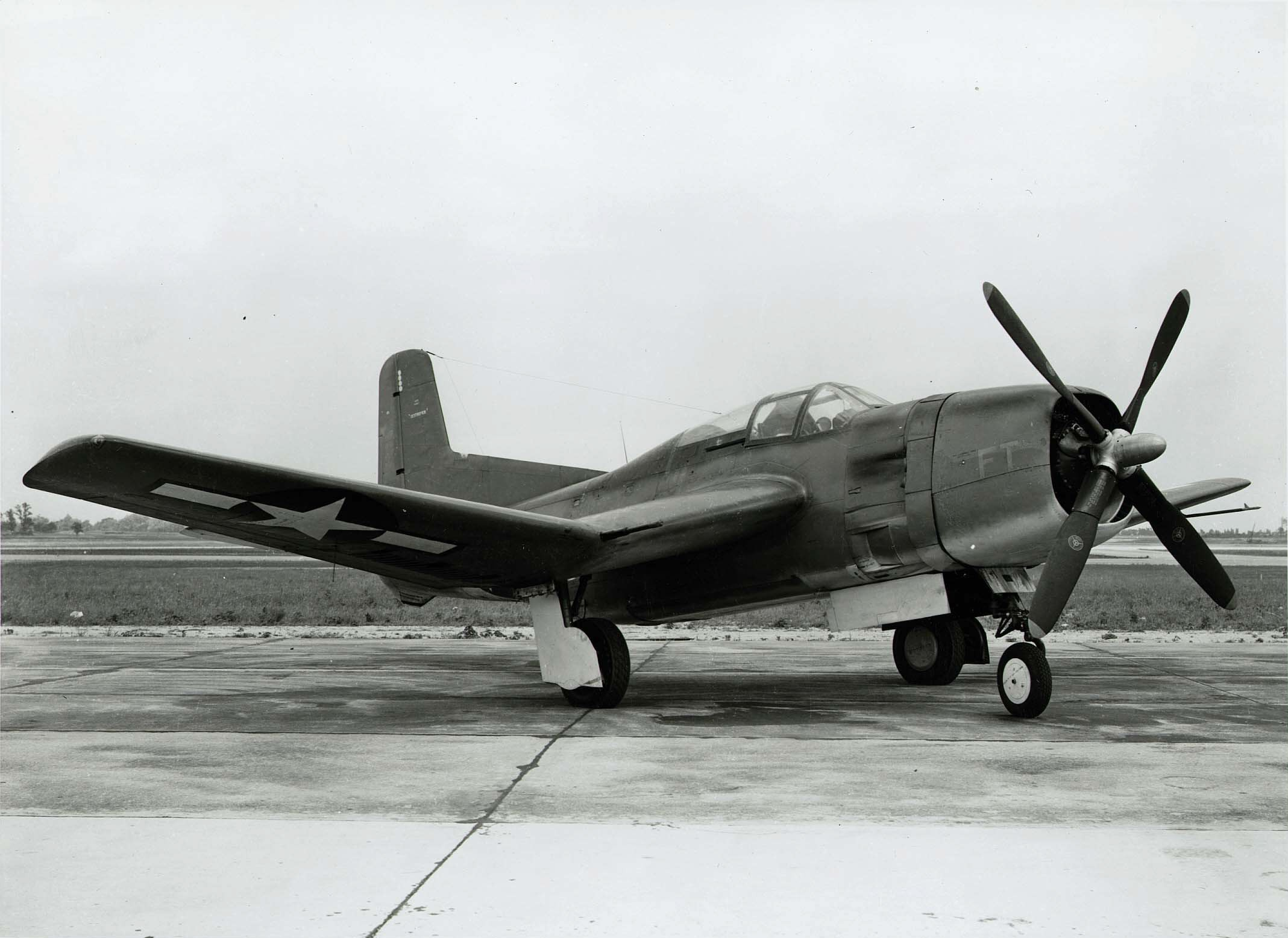
The single-seat BTD-1

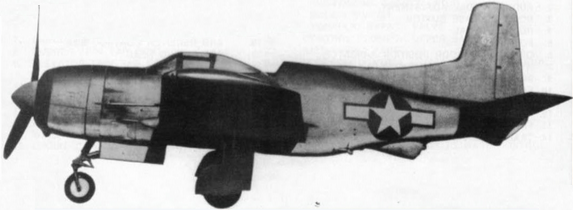
The XBTD-2

XSB2D-1
Prototype two seat torpedo/dive bomber. Two built.
SB2D-1
Proposed production version of XSB2D-1. 358 ordered, but order converted to BTD-1 before any completed
BTD-1
Single seat variant. 26 built.
XBTD-2
Prototypes with mixed propulsion using turbojets, a single Westinghouse 19A engine being added in rear fuselage giving 1,500 lbf (6.7 kN) thrust; did not sufficiently improve performance. First flight May 1944. Two built.

== Operators ==
United States

- United States Navy

== Surviving aircraft ==
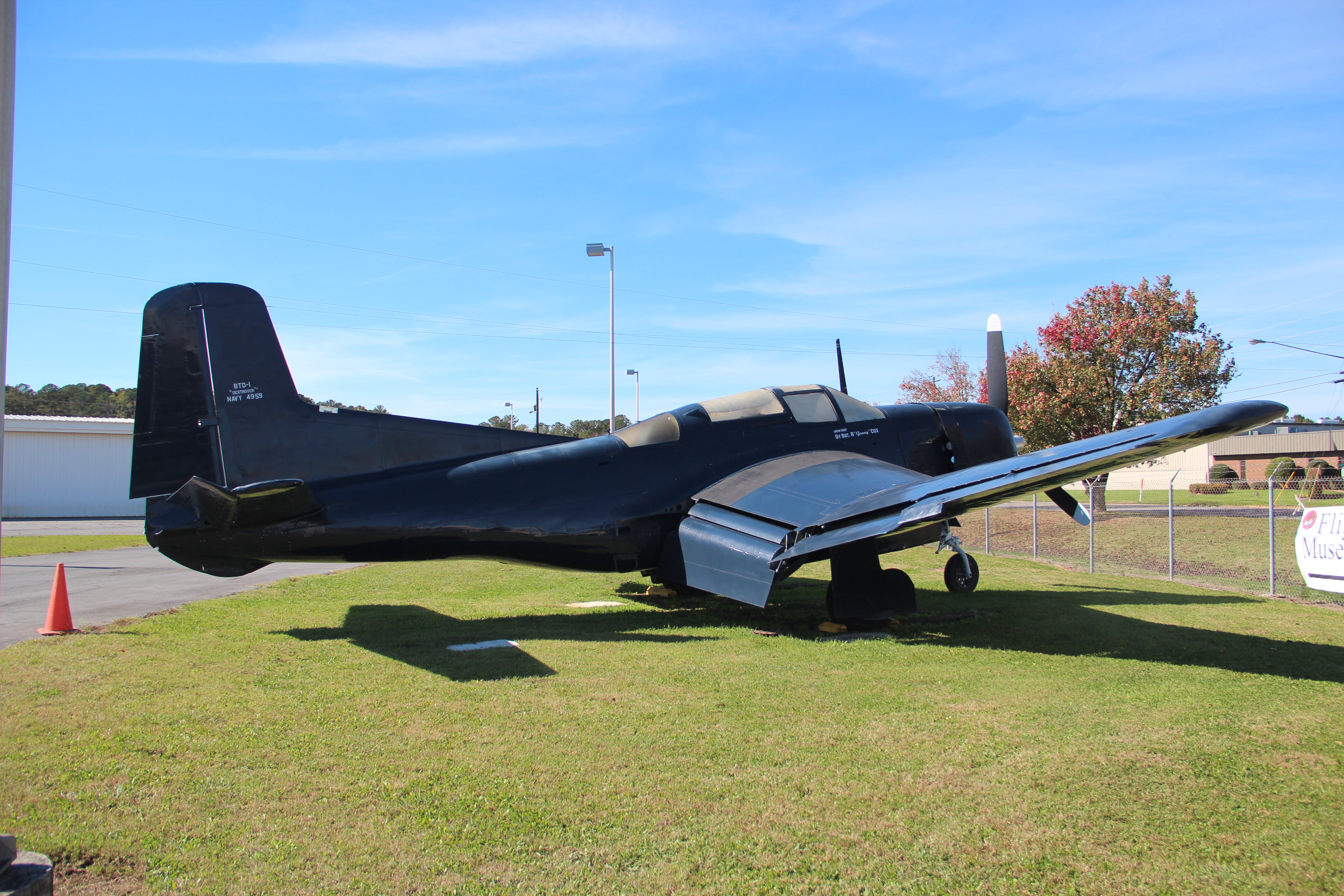
Destroyer 4959 at Richard B. Russell Airport, 2017

BTD-1 Destroyer, Bureau Number 04959, was under restoration for display at the Wings of Eagles Discovery Center, Elmira-Corning Regional Airport, Elmira, New York. This aircraft had long been in the Florence Air & Missile Museum collection until the museum's closing in 1997. In September 2015 the aircraft was relocated to the Hixson Flight Museum in Dallas, Georgia, where it is undergoing restoration.

== Specifications (BTD-1) ==
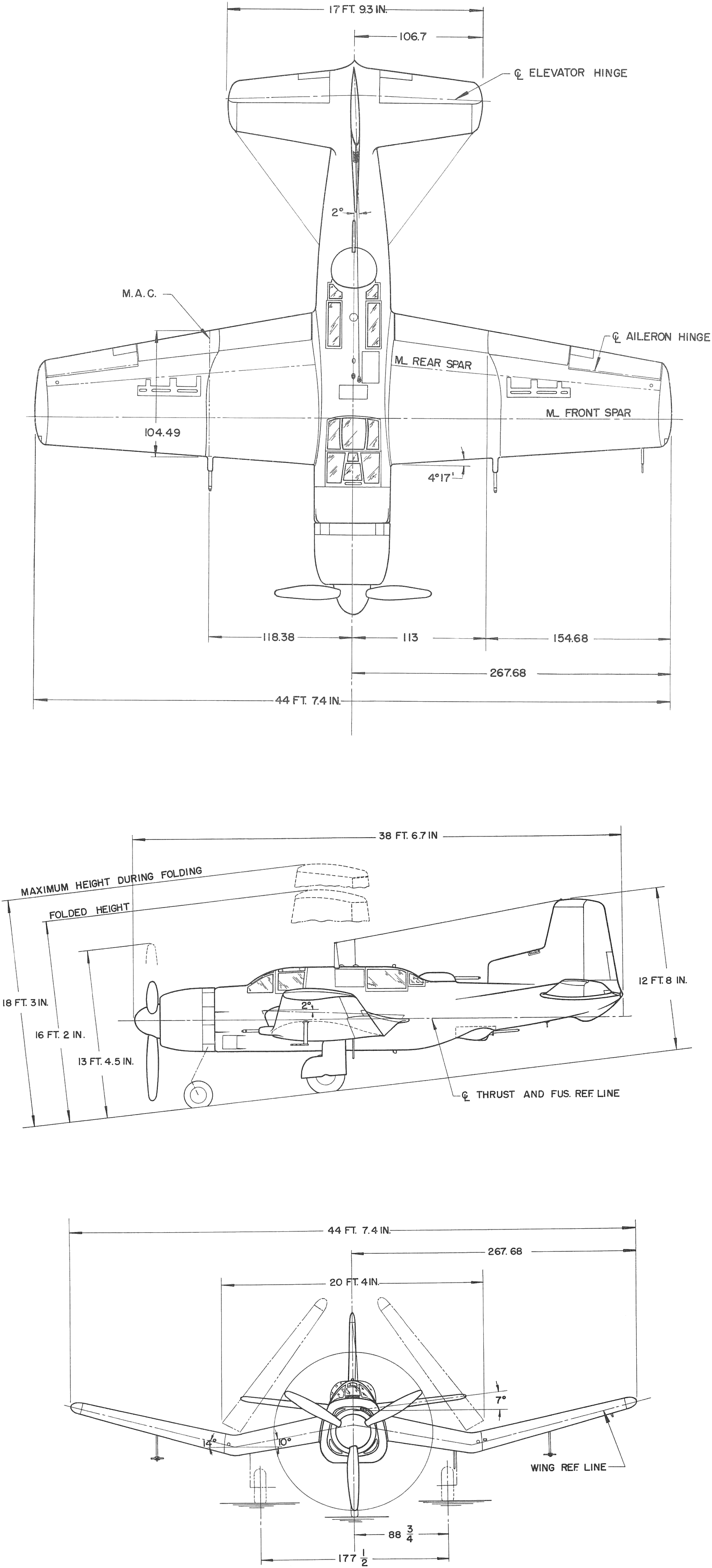
3-view line drawing of the Douglas XSB2D-1 Destroyer

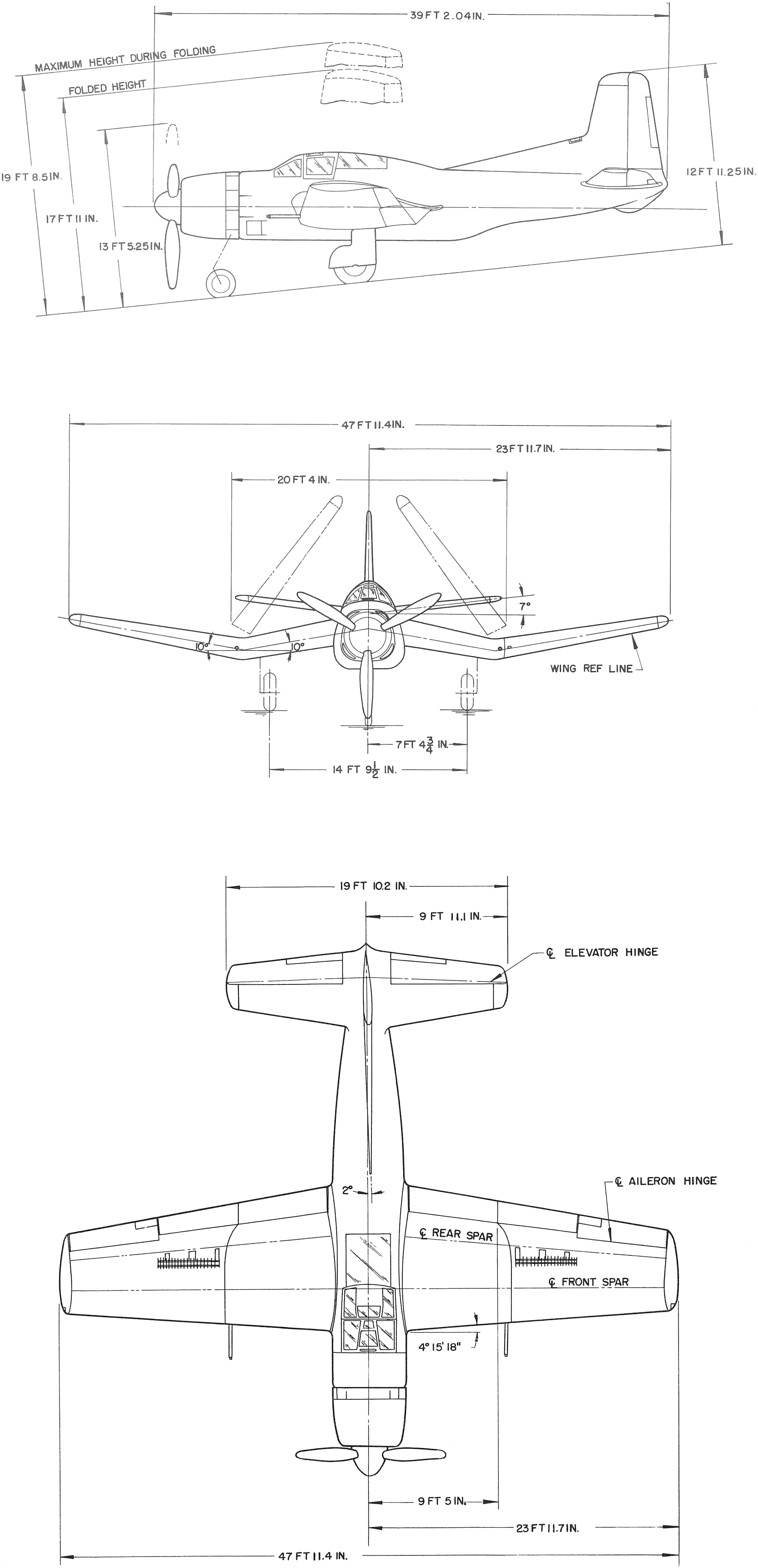
3-view line drawing of the Douglas BTD Destroyer

Data from Jane's all the World's Aircraft 1947, Dave's Warbirds:Douglas BTD Destroyer

General characteristics

- Crew: 1
- Length: 38 ft 7 in (11.77 m)
- Wingspan: 48 ft 0 in (14.64 m)
- Height: 16 ft 7 in (5.05 m) over airscrew, one blade vertical
- Wing area: 373 sq ft (34.7 m^{2})
- Empty weight: 12,900 lb (5,851 kg)
- Gross weight: 18,140 lb (8,228 kg)
- Max takeoff weight: 19,000 lb (8,618 kg)
- Powerplant: 1 × Wright R-3350 Duplex-Cyclone 18-cyl. two-row air-cooled radial piston engine, 2,300 hp (1,700 kW)
- Propellers: 4-bladed constant-speed propeller

Performance

- Maximum speed: 344 mph (554 km/h, 299 kn)
- Cruise speed: 188 mph (303 km/h, 163 kn)
- Range: 1,480 mi (2,380 km, 1,290 nmi)
- Ferry range: 2,140 mi (3,440 km, 1,860 nmi)
- Service ceiling: 23,600 ft (7,200 m)
- Rate of climb: 1,650 ft/min (8.4 m/s)
- Wing loading: 48.6 lb/sq ft (237 kg/m^{2})
- Power/mass: 0.12658 hp/lb (0.2066 kW/kg)

Armament

- Guns: 2 × 20 mm (0.787 in) AN/M2 cannon with 200 rpg
- Bombs: Up to 3,200 lb (1,500 kg) of bombs in the bomb bay or two 1,947 lb (883 kg) Torpedoes

== See also ==
Aircraft of comparable role, configuration, and era

- Douglas XTB2D Skypirate
- Blackburn Firebrand
- BTM Mauler
- Curtiss XSB3C
- Aichi B7A Ryusei

Related lists

- List of aircraft of World War II
- List of United States Navy aircraft designations (pre-1962)
