= Museum of Flight (disambiguation) =

The Museum of Flight is a private non-profit air and space museum near Seattle, Washington.

Museum of Flight may also refer to:

- Aichi Museum of Flight in Toyoyama, Aichi
- Canadian Museum of Flight in Langley, British Columbia
- National Museum of Flight in East Lothian, Scotland
- Museum of Flight (Georgia) in Dallas, Georgia
- Museum of Flight and Aerial Firefighting in Greybull, Wyoming
- Santa Maria Museum of Flight in Santa Maria, California
- Southern Museum of Flight in Birmingham, Alabama
- Western Museum of Flight in Hawthorne, California

== See also ==
Museum of Flying, in Santa Monica, California
