= Sullenberger Aviation Museum =

- Location in North Carolina Sullenberger Aviation Museum (the United States)
- Former name: Carolinas Aviation Museum
- Established: 1991
- Location: Charlotte Douglas International Airport, Charlotte, North Carolina, United States
- Coordinates: 35°13′29″N 80°55′59″W
- Type: Aviation museum
- Founder: Floyd Swinton Wilson
- Website: www.sullenbergeraviation.org

Former logo

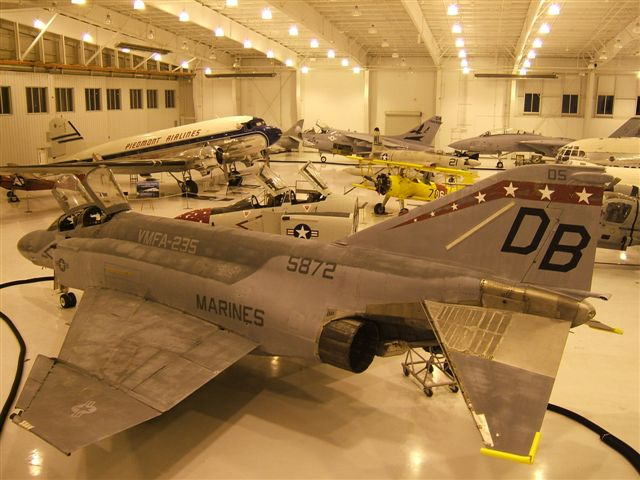
Main Display Hangar, June 2010

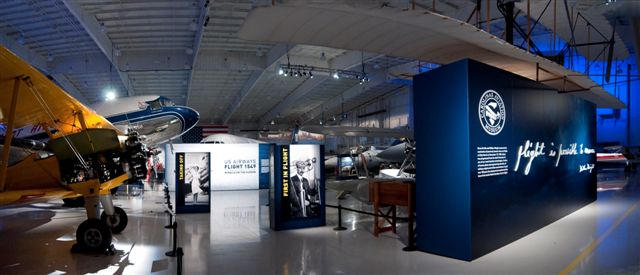
Main Display Hangar, August 2012

The Sullenberger Aviation Museum, formerly the Carolinas Aviation Museum, is an aviation museum on the grounds of Charlotte Douglas International Airport in Charlotte, North Carolina.

== History ==
=== Establishment ===
In 1991, Floyd Wilson, a former commander of the Carolinas Wing of the Commemorative Air Force, and his wife Lois founded the Carolinas Historic Aviation Commission. The following year, Rowan County launched a bid to locate the proposed museum at the local airport. Two hangars at Charlotte Douglas International Airport had been donated to CHAC, but had to be moved to make room for expansion. (Note: Other interested airports included Rock Hill, Lincolnton and Concord.) In 1994, the group put together a proposal to display a B-25 that was to be recovered from Lake Murray. (Note: The aircraft would later go on display at the Southern Museum of Flight.)

The museum received its first school group in early 1994. In 1996, the museum purchased a DC-3 from US Airways that had been painted to resemble an example operated by Piedmont Airlines.

Many of the aircraft were acquired from the now-closed Florence Air & Missile Museum, formerly in Florence, South Carolina. A significant number of aircraft have also come from Marine Corps Air Station Cherry Point and Marine Corps Air Station New River.

By 2004, the museum had purchased a prefabricated hangar from US Airways and planned to erect it on its grounds.

The museum acquired a building from Morris Field, which it dedicated as the Thomas W. Ferebee Building in October 2005.

The museum was initially located in the airport's original 1936 hangar, built by the Works Progress Administration. However, the construction of a new taxiway forced the museum to relocate to the 40,000 sq ft (3,700 m^{2}) former Wachovia Bank hangar, where it reopened on 10 June 2010. The new facility has enabled the majority of the aircraft to be inside a climate-controlled facility, as well as allowing for new displays.

The museum operated three flyable aircraft, a DC-3 and two OV-1Ds, until the late 2000s.

=== Acquisition of US Airways Flight 1549 Aircraft ===
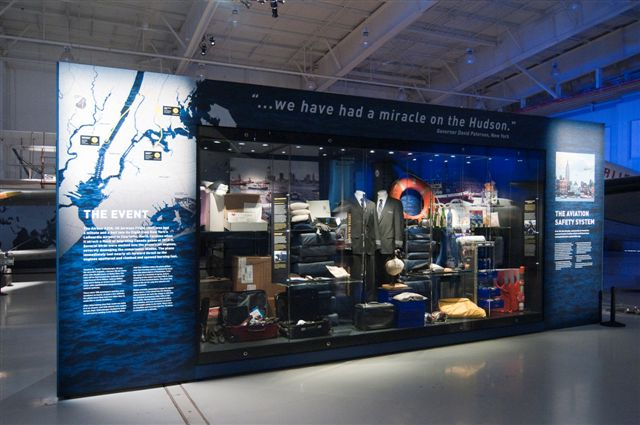
Case containing Capt. Sullenberger's and First Officer Skiles's uniforms

In January 2011, the Carolinas Aviation Museum acquired the Airbus A320 involved in US Airways Flight 1549 from the insurance company, AIG, who donated the aircraft to the museum. The airframe was transported by road from its storage location at J Supor & Son Trucking & Rigging Co. Inc. in Kearny, New Jersey to the museum at Charlotte Douglas International Airport in Charlotte. (Note: The airport was the aircraft's next stop on the day of the accident.) The transportation took 7 days, between June 4 and 10, 2011, and covered 788 miles (1,268 km) through New Jersey, Delaware, Maryland, West Virginia, Virginia, and North Carolina. Because the fuselage was transported in one piece, as it was when it was recovered from the river, the truck was 190 feet (58 m) long. The journey attracted significant media interest.

The airframe has been reassembled and was on display from 2011 to 2019 in the same configuration as it was when it was pulled out of the Hudson River in January 2009. The airframe is being preserved as opposed to restored with dents from the birds and tugboat. In addition to the airframe, Captain Sullenberger and First Officer Skiles contributed their uniforms to the museum's 1549 exhibit.

The aircraft arrived in June 2011, and reassembly of the main components took about one year. The engines arrived in May 2012 and were planned to be reassembled in time for the fourth anniversary of the landing in the Hudson, on January 15, 2013. The museum opened a major new exhibit surrounding Flight 1549 with artifacts such as Captain Sullenberger's uniform in August 2012.

In October 2012, the museum became a Smithsonian affiliate.

A DC-7 owned by the Historic Flight Foundation arrived at the museum in November 2011 to give a ride to Sullenberger and Skiles. However, it suffered an engine failure on takeoff for its return flight to Florida and was grounded. (Note: The aircraft was later donated to the museum.)

In July 2019, the museum closed to the public and all aircraft were moved into temporary storage in preparation for the new facility. (Note: Prior to this, the museum also maintained the Dolph Overton Aviation Library and the Dobbs House restoration facility at other locations around the airport.) The museum developed plans for a new location with a planned re-opening in 2024. In June 2021, the museum announced plans to reopen with a new main gallery and welcome center adjacent to the original 1932 hangar.

On January 14, 2022, the museum announced that it would be renamed the Sullenberger Aviation Museum for Chesley B. "Sully" Sullenberger. The renaming honors Captain Sullenberger's emergency landing of US Airways Flight 1549 on the Hudson River in 2009, an event known as the Miracle on the Hudson. The museum features a permanent exhibit of the events. Also, the museum announced a US$1 million gift from Red Ventures CEO Ric Elias, who survived the flight, and a US$500,000 gift from Lonely Planet. The museum broke ground on its new facility in September 2022.

In October 2023, as part of the rebuilding process, the museum announced a new logo.

In advance of the official opening, which took place on June 1, 2024, a ribbon cutting was held on May 29, 2024, with Sullenberger himself attending. The museum's president, Stephen Saucier, announced he would be retiring at the end of the fiscal year in January 2025.

== Exhibits ==
The museum is divided into three different galleries called Aviation City, Aviation Society and Innovation Nation. Aviation City displays a DC-3, an air traffic control console, an airport beacon and other items and is located in the airport's original 1936 hangar. Aviation Society has an F-14 and an Ercoupe. Innovation Nation exhibits an F-4S, a TV-1 and the A320 from US Airways Flight 1549. The latter is displayed in an as-recovered condition, including everything that was in the aircraft except the passengers' personal belongings.

== Collection ==
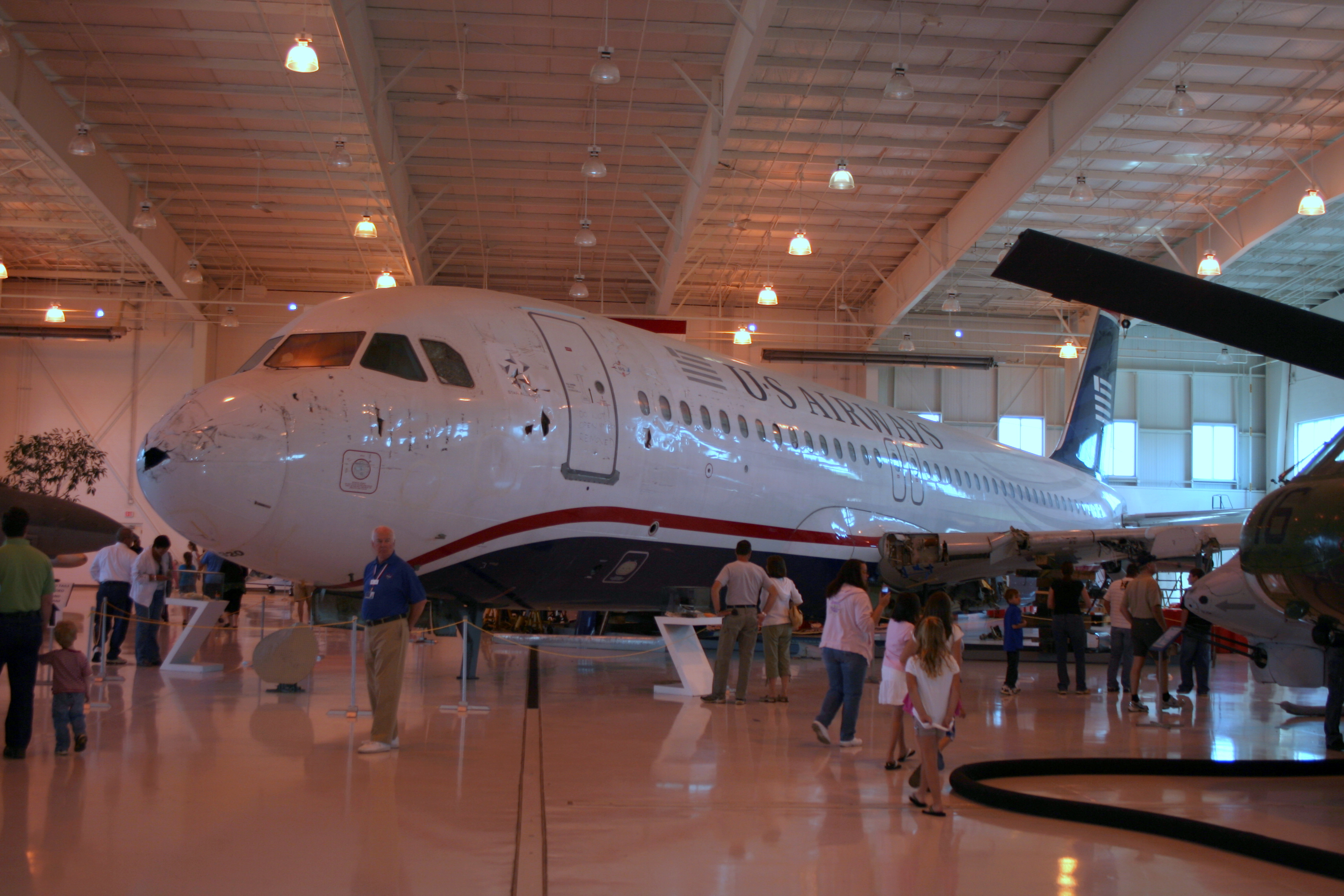
N106US on display in the museum

=== Aircraft ===
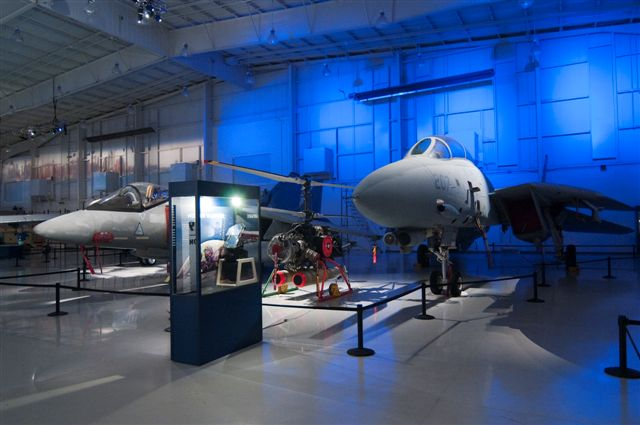
Museum's F-14D and AV-8B Harrier

- 1902 Wright Glider – Replica
- 1903 Wright Flyer – Replica
- Airbus A320-214 N106US
- Beechcraft T-34B Mentor 140931
- Bell 230 c/n 23004
- Bell AH-1J SeaCobra 159216
- Bell UH-1 Iroquois 64-13731
- Bellanca 14-9L Crusair c/n 1037
- Boeing KC-97L Stratofreighter Serial 53-0335 – Cockpit
- Boeing-Stearman N2S-3 41-8706 (Composite)
- Boeing Vertol CH-46D Sea Knight BuNo 153389
- Cessna 150L c/n 15074276
- Champion 7ECA Citabria c/n 87
- Convair YF-102 Delta Dagger 53-1788
- Douglas A-4A Skyhawk
- Douglas C-47 Skytrain 42-4545
- Douglas D-558-1 Skystreak BuNo 37972
- Douglas DC-7B
- Ercoupe 415-C c/n 3805
- Grumman F-14D Tomcat BuNo 161166
- Grumman F9F-6P Cougar BuNo 127487
- Grumman Gulfstream II c/n 001
- Grumman OV-1D Mohawk Serial 62-5890
- Gyrodyne QH-50C DS-1355
- Kaman HOK-1 BuNo 139982
- Lockheed EC-130E Hercules 62-1857
- Lockheed T-33
- Lockheed TV-1 BuNo 33866
- LTV A-7E Corsair II BuNo 159971
- McDonnell Douglas AV-8B Harrier II BuNo 161397
- McDonnell Douglas F-4S Phantom II BuNo 155872
- McDonnell Douglas F-4S Phantom II BuNo 158353 – Cockpit
- North American T-28B Trojan BuNo 138258
- Republic F-84G Thunderjet Serial 53-3253
- Sikorsky CH-34C Choctaw 55-4496
- Sikorsky CH-53A Sea Stallion BuNo 151692
- Sikorsky HH-3E 65-12797
- Sikorsky S-51 47-484

=== Small Objects ===
The museum's collections include:

- Chesley B. Sullenberger Collection
- Dolph D. Overton III Collection
- Piedmont Airlines Collection

==== Commercial Airlines Collections ====
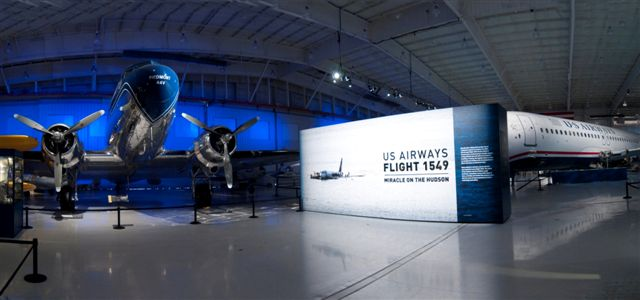
1549 Exhibit Entrance

The museum holds a large collection of artifacts and memorabilia from various legacy airlines which merged into the now-defunct US Airways. The museum's special collections and archival material are currently in storage and inaccessible for research.

The collection includes artifacts from:

- Allegheny Airlines
- America West
- Mohawk Airlines
- Piedmont Airlines
- Pacific Southwest Airlines (PSA)
- Other legacy carriers

== See also ==
- List of aerospace museums
