= Curtiss XSB3C =

Type of aircraft

XSB3C-1
- Three-view drawing of the XSB3C-1 from Johnson 2008.

General information
- Type: Torpedo/dive bomber
- Manufacturer: Curtiss-Wright
- Primary user: United States Navy
- Number built: None

History
- Developed from: Curtiss SB2C Helldiver

The Curtiss XSB3C was a proposed development by Curtiss-Wright of the Curtiss SB2C Helldiver dive bomber, submitted to meet a U.S. Navy requirement for a new dive bomber to replace the SB2C in service. Considered inferior to the competing Douglas XSB2D and requiring higher grade fuel than was provided on aircraft carriers, the project was cancelled before any aircraft were built.

== Design and development ==
In response to a Navy request for proposals issued on 3 February 1941 for a replacement for the SB2C, Curtiss designed an improved and enlarged version of the Helldiver, which was, at the time, still only in the process of flight testing. A larger tail, revised wing planform and tricycle landing gear distinguished the aircraft from its predecessor, in addition to the provision of heavier armament.

An internal bomb bay in the midsection of the aircraft could carry up to 4,000 pounds (1,800 kg) of bombs, or alternatively, two torpedoes could be carried in semi-submerged mountings. In addition, hardpoints for two 500-pound (230 kg) bombs were fitted under the wings. Forward-firing armament proposals were for the aircraft to be fitted with either six .50-calibre machine guns or four 20mm cannon in the wings, while defensive armament was planned to be fitted in a power-operated turret.

Power was intended to be provided by a Wright R-3350 of 2,500 horsepower (1,900 kW), while the Pratt & Whitney R-4360, giving 3,000 horsepower (2,200 kW), was considered for future installation. Impressed with the inspection of the mockup of the massive aircraft in December 1941, the Navy ordered two prototypes, and parts of the design were tested by the XSB2C-6.

As the project progressed during 1942, however, it was determined to be inferior to the competing Douglas aircraft. This, combined with the aircraft's requirement for 115/145 octane fuel, which was considered difficult to handle aboard ship, and the decision by the Bureau of Aeronautics that future attack aircraft would be single-seat aircraft, led to the Navy's decision to cancel the prototype contract, and no examples of the XSB3C were ever built.

== Specifications (XSB3C-1) ==
Data from

General characteristics

- Crew: 2 (pilot and gunner)
- Powerplant: 1 × Wright R-3350-8 radial piston engine, 2,300 hp (1,700 kW)

Armament

- 6 .50-cal machine guns or 4 20mm cannon in wings
- Unspecified defensive guns
- 4,000 pounds (1,800 kg) bombs or 2 torpedoes in internal bay
- Hardpoints for two 500-pound (230 kg) bombs under wings

== See also ==
Related development

- Curtiss SB2C Helldiver

Aircraft of comparable role, configuration, and era

- Blackburn Firebrand
- Martin AM/BTM Mauler
- Douglas SB2D/BTD Destroyer

Related lists

- List of United States Navy aircraft designations (pre-1962)
