= Curtiss SB2C Helldiver =

Carrier-based dive bomber aircraft

SB2C Helldiver A-25 Shrike
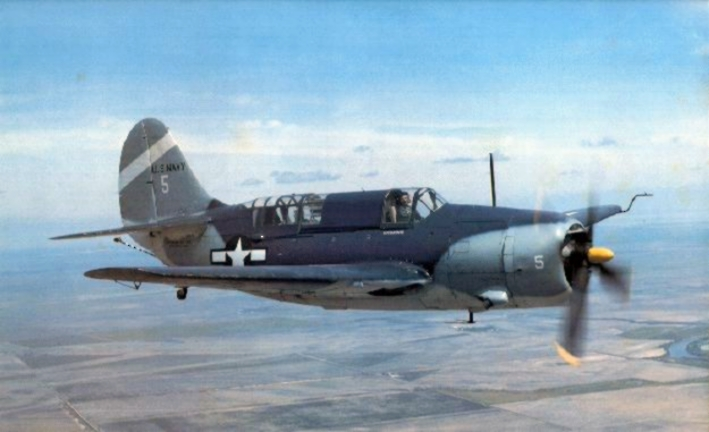
- A Curtiss SB2C Helldiver in tricolor scheme and tail markings for VB-80, operating off USS Hancock, February 1945

General information
- Type: Dive bomber
- National origin: United States
- Manufacturer: Curtiss-Wright
- Built by: Fairchild (Canada) (SBF); Canadian Car and Foundry (SBW)
- Primary users: United States Navy: United States Marine Corps; United States Army Air Forces; French Navy
- Number built: 7,140

History
- Manufactured: 1943–1945
- Introduction date: December 1942
- First flight: 18 December 1940
- Retired: 1959 (Italy)
- Developed into: Curtiss XSB3C

The Curtiss SB2C Helldiver was a dive bomber developed by Curtiss-Wright during World War II. Nicknames for the aircraft included "Big-Tailed Beast" or just "Beast", "Two-Cee", and "Son-of-a-Bitch 2nd Class"; the latter nickname was derived from the name SB2C and the aircraft's reputation for having difficult handling characteristics.

The Helldiver was developed during the late 1930s and early 1940s for the United States Navy (USN) to serve as a carrier-based bomber to supplement and replace the Douglas SBD Dauntless. First flown on 18 December 1940, the XSB2C-1 prototype initially demonstrated poor handling characteristics and other issues; late modifications caused lengthy delays to production and deployment, to the extent that the aircraft was investigated by the Truman Committee, which produced a scathing report. This negative coverage contributed to the decline of Curtiss as a company, and delayed the type's entry to service, despite the urgency associated with the outbreak of the Pacific War, until December 1942. In late 1943, a land-based variant, designated as the A-25 Shrike, became available; however, by this point, most Allied air forces had abandoned dedicated dive bombers. Accordingly, the majority of A-25s delivered to the United States Army Air Forces (USAAF) were promptly transferred to the United States Marine Corps (USMC), which used the type only in one-side campaign and non-combat roles. The British Royal Navy and the Royal Australian Air Force both cancelled substantial orders for the type, retaining only a few aircraft for research purposes.

In service, the type was not typically appreciated by either pilots or senior USN officials. Nevertheless, the Helldiver was faster than the Dauntless, and by the end of World War II, the Helldiver had become the primary dive bomber and attack aircraft on USN carriers. As a result, several major battles fought during the latter part of the conflict had Helldivers present, including the Battle of the Philippine Sea, the Battle of Leyte Gulf, the Battle of Iwo Jima, and the Battle of Okinawa. The type was only briefly used during the early years of the Cold War, but did see further combat with other nations, such as with the Royal Hellenic Air Force during the Greek Civil War and the French Navy during the First Indochina War. Military use of the Helldiver ceased in the late 1950s, the dive bomber role having been largely rendered obsolete by the advent of air-to-ground rockets. Several Helldivers have been preserved into the twenty-first century.

== Design and development ==
The origins of the Helldiver can be traced back to 1938 and the issuing of a specification by the USN, seeking a replacement for the Douglas SBD Dauntless. In comparison to the Dauntless, the Helldiver was a much larger aircraft, able to operate from the latest aircraft carriers and carry a considerable array of armament. Despite this, it was necessary for it to be an exceptionally short airplane due to the USN also requiring two aircraft to fit onto an Essex-class carrier's elevators. The USN's requirements led to an aircraft with the contradictory requirements of being larger than any other carrier aircraft on the inside while being sharply size-restricted on the outside. Saddled with demanding requirements set forth by both the U.S. Marines and United States Army Air Forces, the manufacturer incorporated features of a "multirole" aircraft into the design.

The resulting aircraft possessed a relatively stubby and squat appearance, featuring a barrel-like forward fuselage with a deep belly that swept upwards towards the rear. The wing, which was fitted with automatic slots, featured a straight leading edge and a forward-swept trailing edge; it could be folded for more compact stowage onboard ship. The wing and the tail-unit were unusually close-coupled; the tail unit featured a backswept leading edge and rounded tips. Both the fin and the rudder were relatively large, however, the tail unit was relatively short, which negatively impacted its directional authority. To enable it to better perform its core mission as a dive bomber, it was equipped with dive brakes that gave the pilot better control during descent as well as preventing the aircraft from attaining excessively high speed. Armor was present to protect both the pilot and tail gunner. It featured an internal bomb bay that reduced drag when carrying heavy ordnance, which was a first for an American dive bomber.

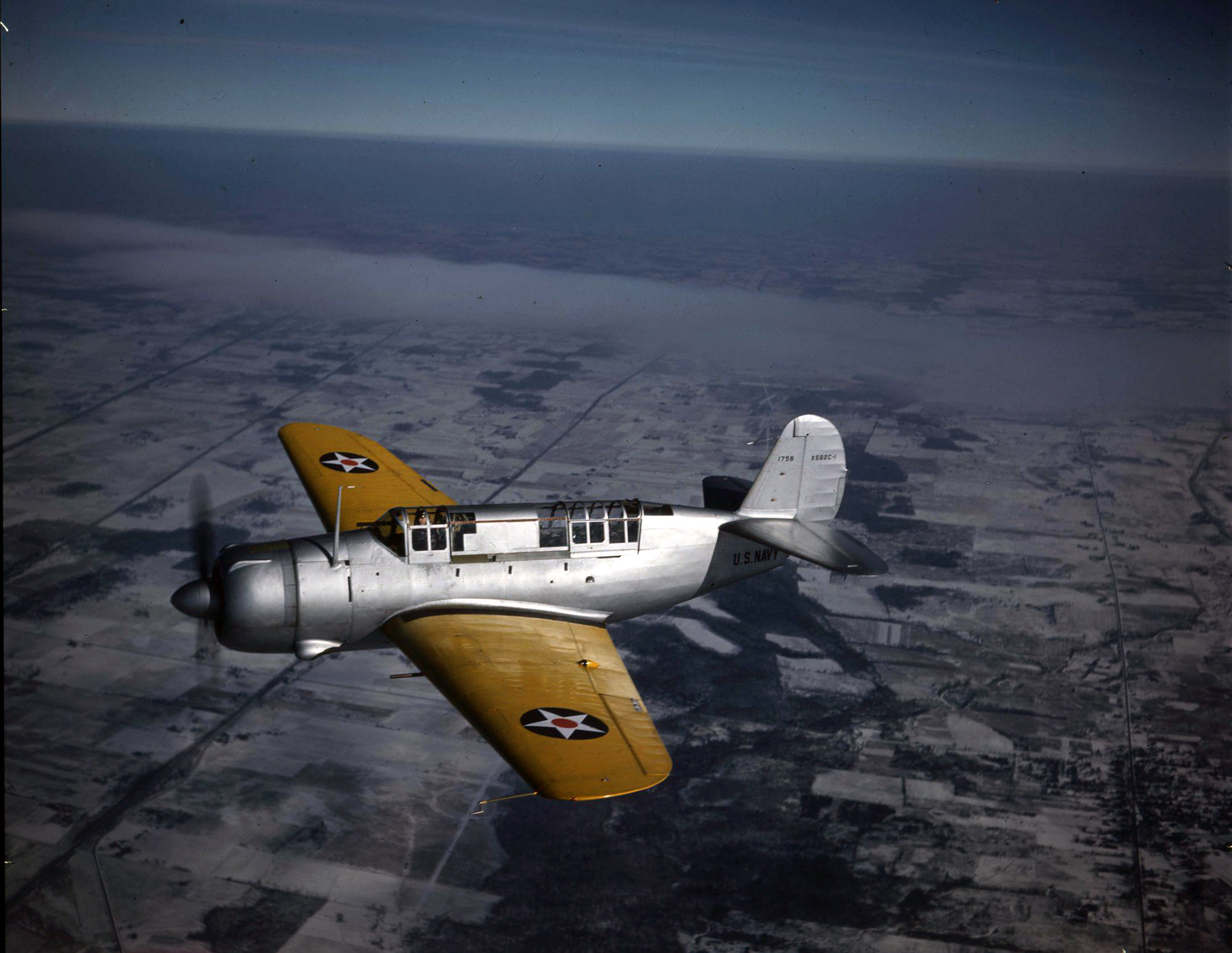
Curtiss XSB2C Helldiver prototype on its maiden flight

Early on, the type suffered from development issues, some of which were related to its Wright R-2600-20 Twin Cyclone radial engine and three-bladed propeller; further concerns included structural weaknesses, poor handling, directional instability, and bad stall characteristics. In 1939, a student took a model of the XSB2C-1 to the MIT wind tunnel. Professor of Aeronautical Engineering Otto C. Koppen, in reference to the controllability issues with the compact vertical tail, was quoted as saying: "if they build more than one of these, they are crazy".

Among its major faults, the Helldiver was underpowered, had a shorter range than the SBD, was equipped with an unreliable electrical system, and its manufacturing quality control was often poor. The Curtiss-Electric propeller and the complex hydraulic system suffered from frequent maintenance problems. One of the faults of the aircraft throughout its operational life was poor longitudinal stability, resulting from a fuselage that was too short due to the necessity of fitting onto aircraft carrier elevators. The Helldiver's aileron response was also poor and handling suffered greatly under 90 kn (100 mph; 170 km/h) airspeed; since the speed of approach to land on a carrier was supposed to be 85 kn (98 mph; 157 km/h), this proved problematic.

On 18 December 1940, the XSB2C-1 prototype performed its maiden flight. It crashed on 8 February 1941 when its engine failed on approach, after which Curtiss was instructed to rebuild it. During this reconstruction, the fuselage was lengthened, an enlarged tail unit was fitted, and an autopilot was fitted to address the aircraft's poor stability. On 20 October 1941, the revised prototype flew once more; however, it was destroyed after a wing failure occurred during diving tests on 21 December 1941. Accordingly, the prototype could never be used in service trials.

On 29 November 1940, large-scale production of the type was ordered, however, it was specified that a large number of modifications be implemented for the production model. These included increased fin and rudder area, expanded fuel capacity, the adoption of self-sealing fuel tanks, and the fixed armament was doubled to four 0.50 in (12.7 mm) machine guns in the wings, compared with the prototype's two cowling guns. Accordingly, the SB2C-1 was built with larger fuel tanks, considerably improving its range. However, the 880 changes demanded by the USN and modification of the aircraft to better suit its combat role resulted in a 42 percent weight increase, which in turn impacted its performance.

In June 1942, the first production Helldiver flew for the first time. However, the long term resolution to several of the aircraft's performance issues did not arrive until 1944 with the introduction of the SB2C-3. This improved model was powered by the R-2600-20 Twin Cyclone engine, capable of producing up to 1,900 hp (1,400 kW), which drove a new Curtiss-developed four-bladed propeller.

The program suffered from numerous delays, to the extent that the Grumman TBF Avenger entered service before the Helldiver, despite work on the Avenger having begun development two years later. Nevertheless, production tempo accelerated with production at Columbus, Ohio, and two Canadian factories: Fairchild Aircraft Ltd. (Canada), which produced 300 (under the designations XSBF-l, SBF-l, SBF-3, and SBF-4E), and Canadian Car and Foundry, which built 894 (designated SBW-l, SBW-3, SBW-4, SBW-4E, and SBW-5), these models being respectively equivalent to their Curtiss-built counterparts. A total of 7,140 SB2Cs and equivalent models were produced in World War II.

== Operational history ==
=== US Navy ===
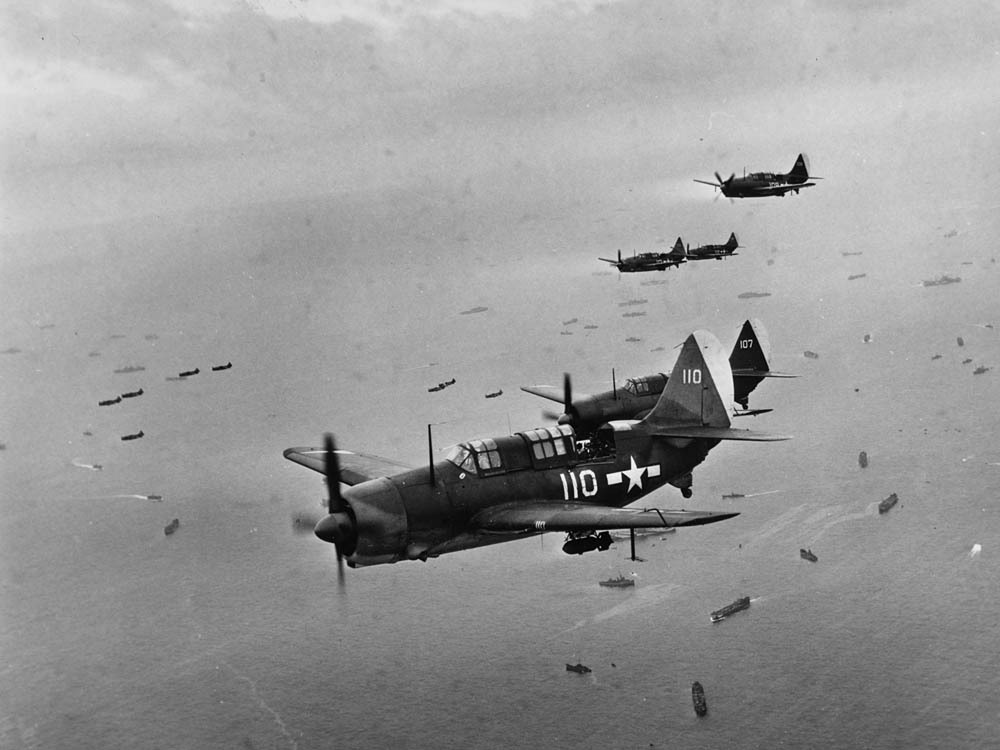
SB2C-4 from Yorktown off Iwo Jima

The U.S. Navy would not accept the SB2C until 880 modifications to the design and the changes on the production line had been made, delaying the Curtiss Helldiver's combat debut until 11 November 1943 with squadron VB-17 on Bunker Hill, when they attacked the Japanese-held port of Rabaul on the island of New Britain, north of Papua New Guinea. The first version of the SB2C-1 was kept stateside for training, its various development problems leading to only 200 aircraft being built. Accordingly, the first deployment model was the SB2C-1C. The SB2C-1 could deploy slats mechanically linked with landing gear actuators, that extended from the outer third of the wing leading edge to aid lateral control at low speeds. The early prognosis of the "Beast" was unfavourable; it was strongly disliked by aircrews due to its size, weight, and reduced range compared to the SBD it replaced. In 1943, the air commander of the Atlantic Fleet stated that: "due to continued malfunctioning, structural failures and other operational difficulties which affect use of armament and safety in flight, SB2C airplanes were considered entirely unsuitable for assignment to combatant carriers at this time".

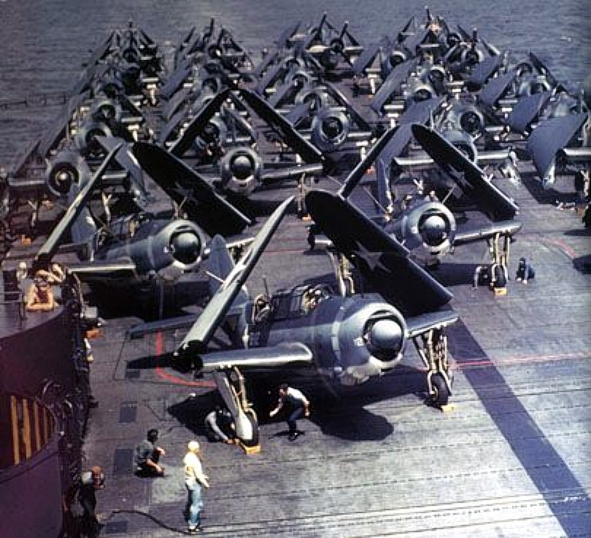
SB2C-1s in tricolor scheme (front) on the flight deck of Yorktown in 1943.

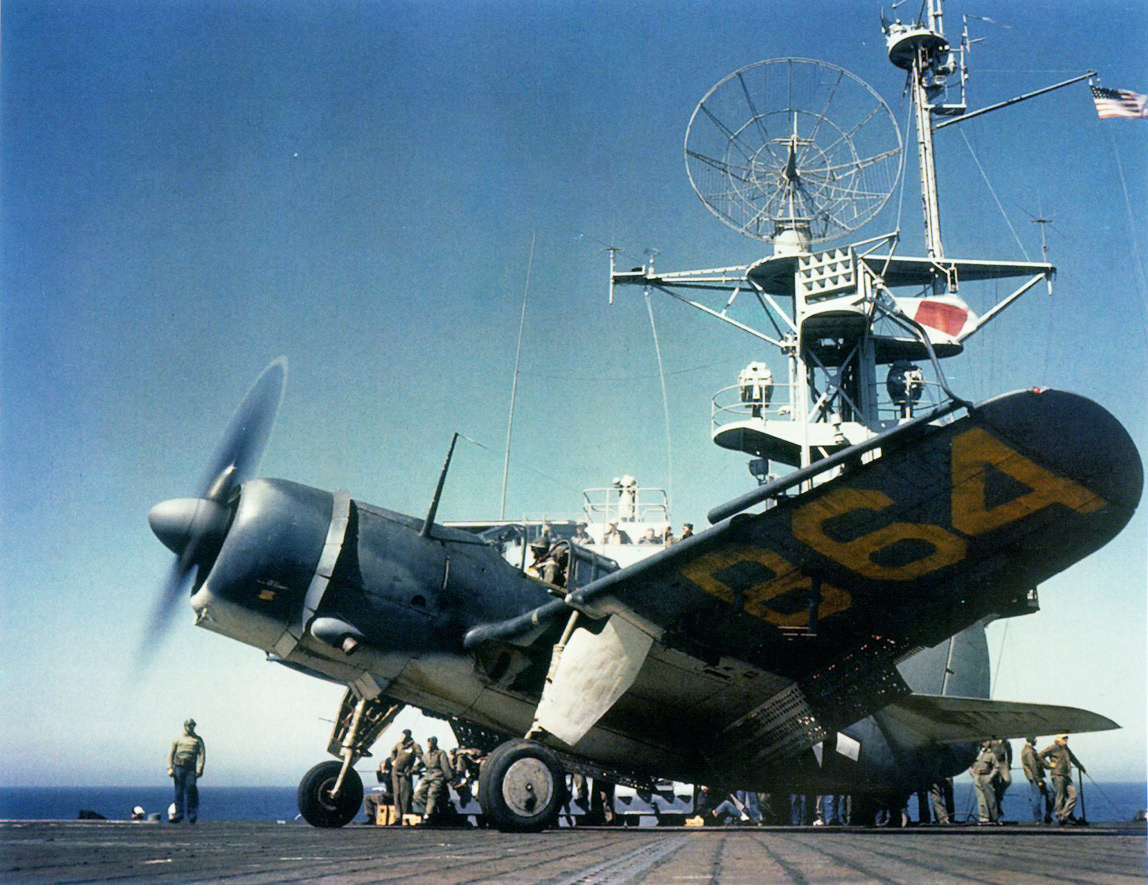
SB2C Helldiver during takeoff.

The Helldiver participated in several major battles, including the Battle of the Philippine Sea (over the Marianas), the Battle of Leyte Gulf (near the Philippines), the Battle of Iwo Jima, and the Battle of Okinawa. Amongst other milestones, the type was credited with being partially responsible for the sinking of the Japanese battleships Musashi and sister ship Yamato, although other aircraft, such as the Grumman TBF Avenger, have been recognised as having likely achieved more damage to these vessels. During the Battle of the Philippine Sea, 45 Helldivers, most of which had been launched from extreme range, were lost after they ran out of fuel while attempting to return to their carriers; only five aircraft of the 51 Helldivers dispatched on this attack were able to successfully return.

In the closing months of the conflict, Helldivers were also employed in the 1945 attacks on the Ryukyu Islands and the Japanese home island of Honshū in tactical attacks on airfields, communications, and shipping. The type was extensively used on patrols during the period between the dropping of the atomic bombs and the official Japanese surrender and in the immediate preoccupation period.

An oddity of the SB2Cs with 1942- to 1943-style tricolor camouflage was that the undersides of the outer wing panels carried dark topside camouflage because the undersurfaces were visible from above when the wings were folded.

In operational experience, the U.S. Navy's Grumman F6F Hellcat and Vought F4U Corsair fighters were found to be able to carry an equally heavy bomb load against ground targets and were vastly more capable of defending themselves against enemy fighters. The Helldiver, however, could still deliver ordnance with more precision against specific targets and its two-seat configuration permitted a second set of eyes. The Helldiver also had a significant advantage in range over a fighter, while carrying a bombload, which is crucial in naval operations.

The advent of air-to-ground rockets ensured that the SB2C was the last purpose-built dive bomber produced. Rockets allowed precision attack against surface naval and land targets, while avoiding the stresses of near-vertical dives and the demanding performance requirements that they placed on dive bombers.

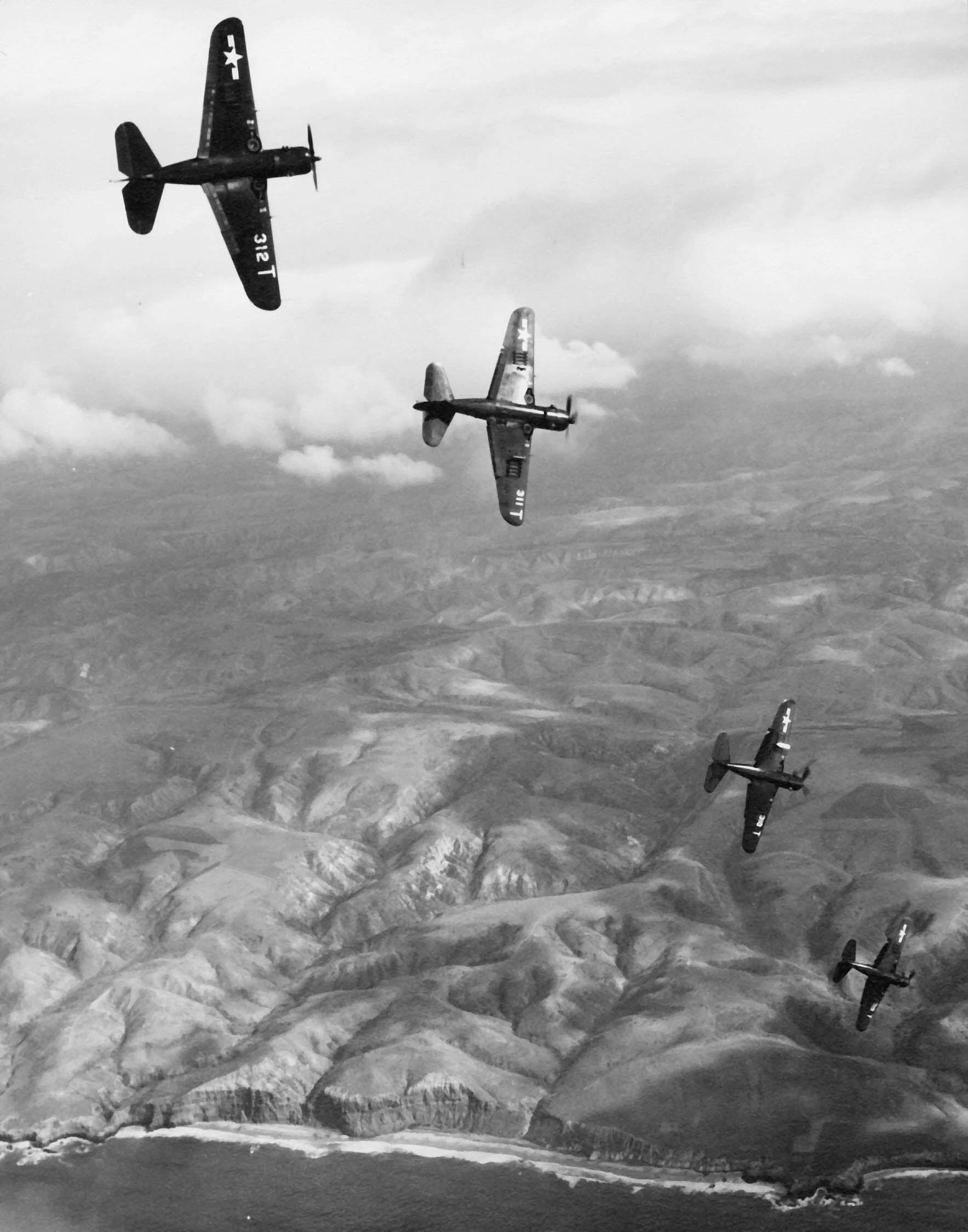
USN SB2C-5 Helldivers of Attack Squadron 1A (VA-1A) "Tophatters" roll into dives to support amphibious forces during postwar landing exercise (1947)

The SB2C remained in active postwar service in active-duty US Navy squadrons until 1947 and in Naval Reserve aviation units until 1950. Surplus aircraft were sold to the naval air forces of France, Italy, Greece, Portugal, and Thailand. The Helldiver was effectively replaced by the Douglas A-1 Skyraider.

=== US Army and US Marine Corps service ===
Built at Curtiss' St. Louis plant, 900 aircraft were ordered by the USAAF under the designation A-25A Shrike. The first 10 aircraft had folding wings, while the remainder of the production order omitted this feature. Many other changes distinguished the A-25A, including larger main wheels, a pneumatic tailwheel, ring and bead gunsight, longer exhaust stubs, and other Army-specified radio equipment. By late 1943, when the A-25A was being introduced, the USAAF no longer had a role for the dive bomber, as fighter aircraft such as the Republic P-47 Thunderbolt had shown their ability to carry out tactical air-support missions with great success.

The USAAF transferred 410 Helldivers to the US Marines. The A-25As were converted to the USMC variant, SB2C-1A and one squadron, VMSB-151, based on Enjebi (or Engebi/Enjibe; part of Enewetak Atoll) conducted bombing missions on bypassed Japanese strongpoints nearby. Otherwise, the SB2C-1A variant never saw combat and was used primarily as a trainer and target tug.

=== Australian service ===
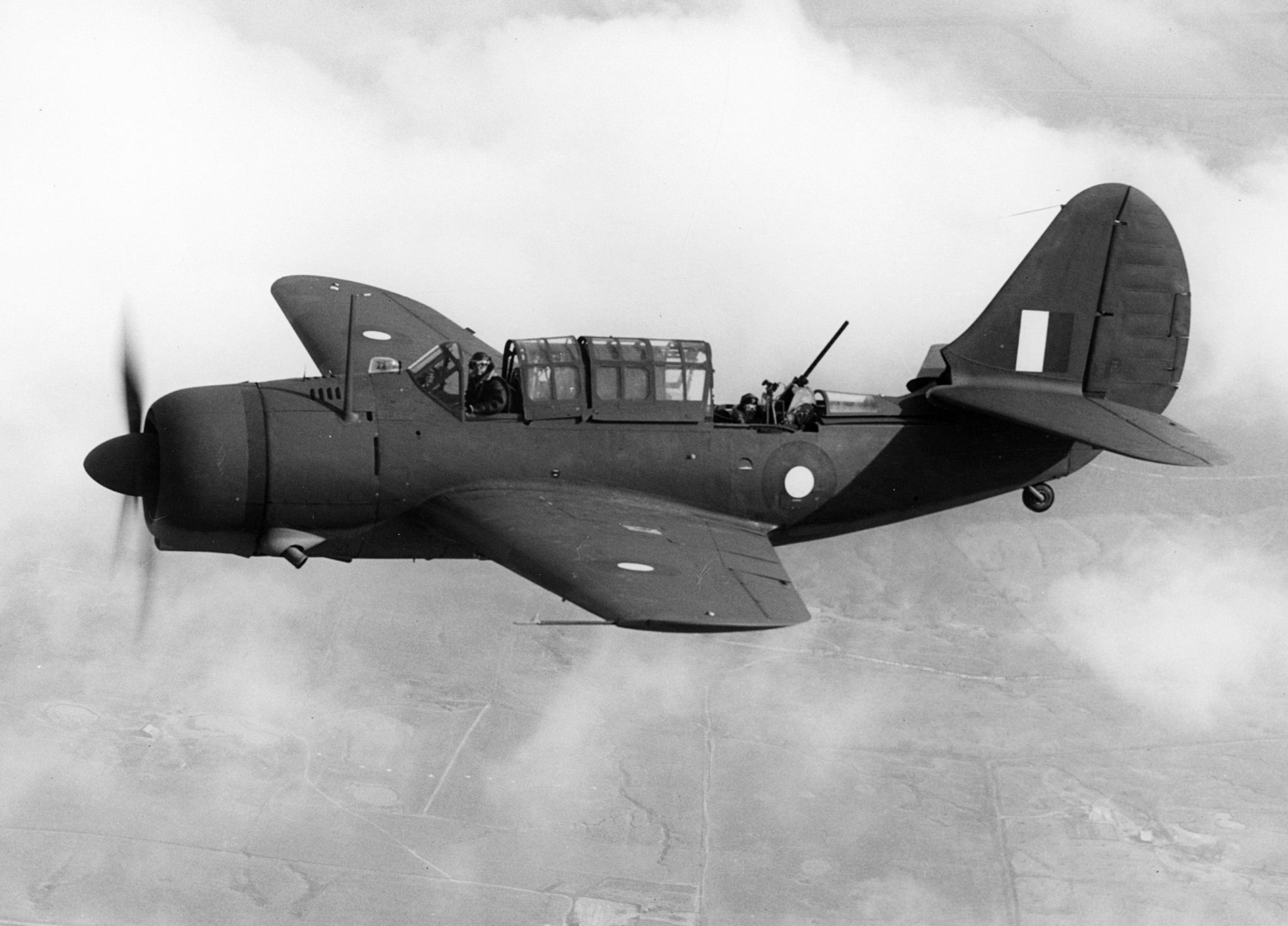
A69-4, the only Shrike to enter RAAF service

At an early stage of World War II, the Australian government noted that the Royal Australian Air Force (RAAF) lacked dedicated dive bombers and ordered 150 Shrikes. These aircraft were paid for by the US government as Lend Lease aid. By November 1943, when the first shipment of 10 Shrikes arrived in Australia, the RAAF had decided that dive bombing was an outmoded tactic. Vultee Vengeance dive bombers, which were already in service with the RAAF, were being replaced by light bombers. As a result, the order for the remaining 140 Shrikes was cancelled.

While the 10 aircraft received were taken on strength, with the RAAF serial prefix A69, only one of these Shrikes officially took to the air in RAAF service. A69-4 was assigned to No. 1 Air Performance Unit, for performance testing, between December 1943 and April 1944. The RAAF and US Fifth Air Force already operated a joint pool of aircraft types common to both services in the South West Pacific theatre and, by mid-January 1944, the other nine Shrikes had been transferred to USAAF units. A69-4 was also transferred to the USAAF in December 1944.

=== British service ===
The Helldiver's service with the British resembled Australian experience with the type. In total, 26 aircraft out of 450 ordered were delivered to the Royal Navy's Fleet Air Arm, where they were known as the Helldiver I. After unsatisfactory tests by the Aeroplane and Armament Experimental Establishment (A&AEE) that pinpointed "appalling handling", none of the British Helldivers were used in action.

=== Greek service ===
American aid provided the Royal Hellenic Air Force with 48 SB2C-5 Helldivers from surplus USN stocks that were delivered by the aircraft carrier USS Sicily in the spring of 1949. From the 48 aircraft, six were used for ground instruction or spare parts and 42 were given to 336th Fighter Squadron (336 Μοίρα Διώξεως) to replace Supermarine Spitfires and the squadron's name was changed to 336th Bomber Squadron (336 Μοίρα Βομβαρδισμού). Greek Helldivers had minor changes to better suit the counterinsurgency mission profile; specifically, the hard rubber tailwheel (for carrier use) was replaced by a bigger pneumatic tire that was more compatible with austere landing strips, and the rear gunner station and its twin machine guns were eliminated, as no aerial opposition existed and the weight reduction achieved could be used to carry more bombs and machine guns.

Helldivers, Spitfires, and North American T-6D/Gs were used in ground-attack missions against Communist ground forces, camps, and transports during the last stages of the Greek Civil War. The type had a relatively brief combat service with Greece before being phased out by 1953. A few were in use until 1957 as photographic aircraft. One SB2C-5 was restored in 1997 and is displayed in the Hellenic Air Force Museum.

=== French service ===
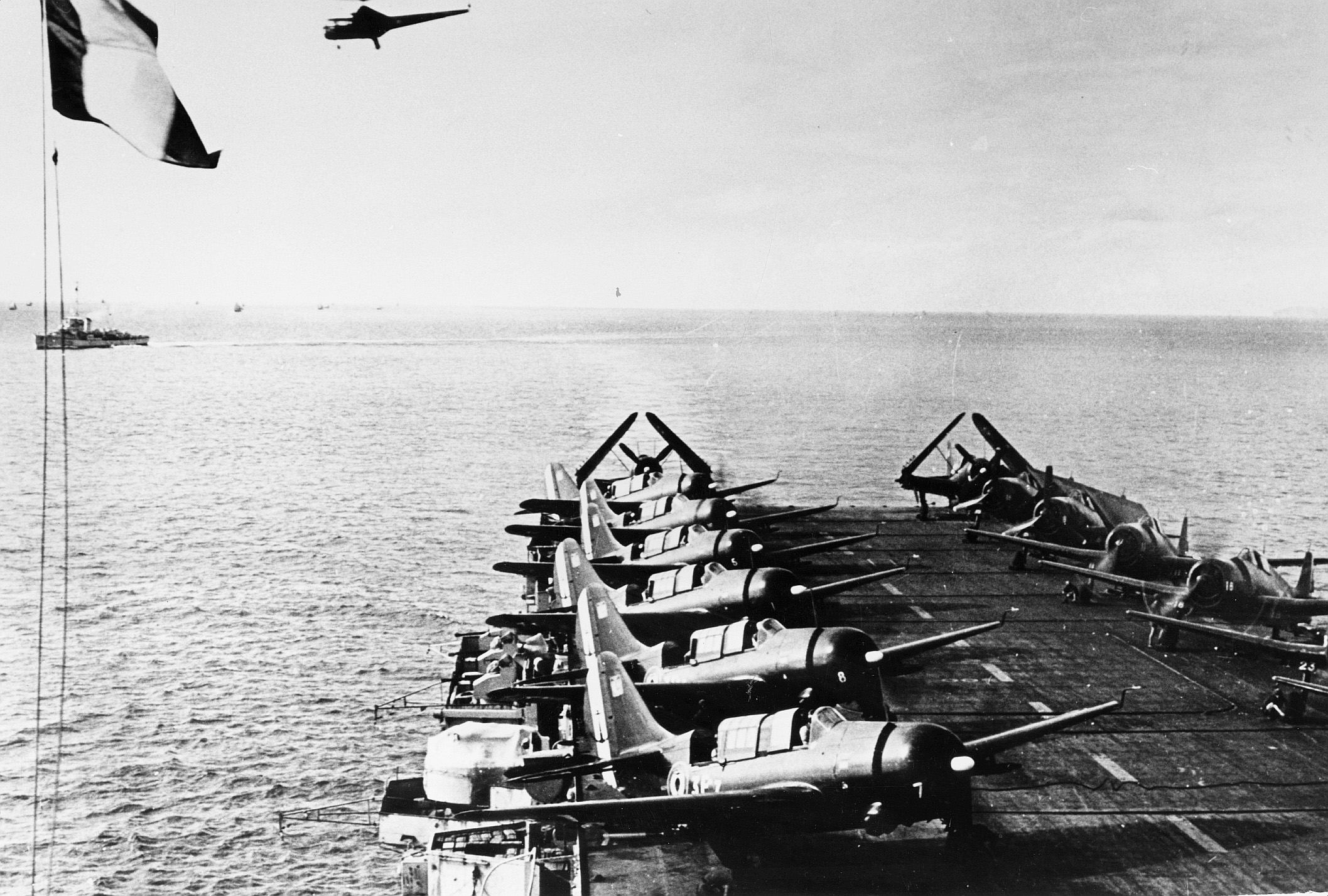
Helldivers on the flight deck of the French aircraft carrier Arromanches in 1951. At this time the ship was operating off Indochina.

Between 1949 and 1954, France bought 110 SB2C-5 Helldiver aircraft to replace their aging SBD-5 Dauntless that had been flying in combat in Vietnam. The French Aeronavale operated the Helldiver up to 1958.

Some of these aircraft were allotted to flottilles 3F and 9F stationed on board the carriers Arromanches, Bois Belleau, and La Fayette, during the First Indochina War. The Helldivers were used to support French troops on the ground during the Battle of Dien Bien Phu in 1954.

== Variants ==
XSB2C-1
Prototype powered by a 1,700 hp (1,268 kW) R-2600-8 engine
SB2C-1
Production version for United States Navy with four 0.50 in (12.7 mm) wing guns and one 0.30 in (7.62 mm) dorsal gun, 200 built.
SB2C-1A
Original designation for United States Army Air Corps version which became A-25A later used for 410 A-25As transferred to the United States Marine Corps.
SB2C-1C
SB2C-1 with two 20 mm (0.79 in) wing-mounted cannons and hydraulically-actuated flaps, 778 built. First to see combat.
XSB2C-2
One SB2C-1 fitted with twin floats in 1942.
SB2C-2
Production float plane version, 287 cancelled and not built.
XSB2C-3
One SB2C-1 re-engined with a 1,900 hp (1,417 kW) R-2600-20.
SB2C-3
As SB2C-1c re-engined with a 1,900 hp (1,417 kW) R-2600-20 and four-bladed propeller, 1,112 built.
SB2C-3E
SB2C-3s fitted with APS-4 radar.
SB2C-4
SB2C-1c but fitted with wing racks for eight 5 in (127 mm) rockets or 1,000 lb (454 kg) bombs, 2,045 built.
SB2C-4E
SB2C-4s fitted with APS-4 radar.
XSB2C-5
Two SB2C-4s converted as prototypes for -5 variant.
SB2C-5
SB2C-4 with increased fuel capacity, frameless sliding canopy, tailhook fixed in extended position, and deletion of the ASB radar, 970 built (2,500 cancelled).
XSB2C-6
Two SB2C-1Cs fitted with 2,100 hp (1,566 kW) R-2600-22 engine and increased fuel capacity.
SBF-1
Canadian built version of the SB2C-1, 50 built by Fairchild-Canada
SBF-3
Canadian built version of the SB2C-3, 150 built by Fairchild-Canada.
SBF-4E
Canadian built version of the SB2C-4E, 100 built by Fairchild-Canada.
SBW-1
Canadian built version of the SB2C-1, 38 built by Canadian Car & Foundry company.
SBW-1B
Canadian built version for lend-lease to the Royal Navy as the Helldiver I, 28 aircraft built by Canadian Car & Foundry company.
SBW-3
Canadian built version of the SB2C-3, 413 built by Canadian Car & Foundry company.
SBW-4E
Canadian built version of the SB2C-4E, 270 built by Canadian Car & Foundry company.

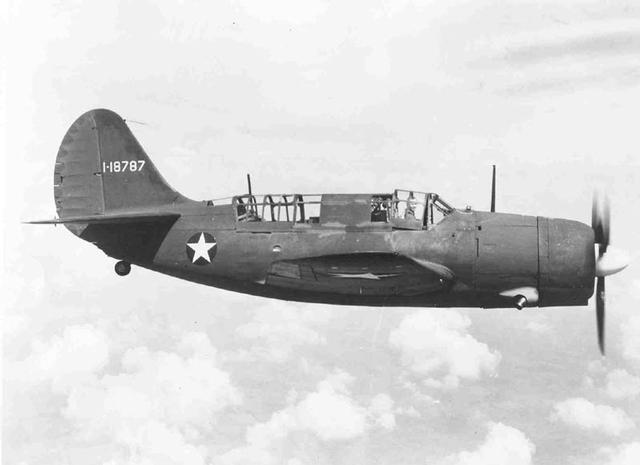
USAAF A-25 Shrike (AAF Ser. No. 41-18787) in flight.

SBW-5
Canadian-built version of the SB2C-5, 85 built (165 cancelled) by the Canadian Car & Foundry company.
A-25A Shrike
United States Army Air Corps version without arrester gear or folding wings and equipment changed, 900 built
Helldiver I
Royal Navy designation for 28 Canadian-built SBW-1Bs
B.J.3
(Thai: บ.จ.๓) Royal Thai Air Force designation of the SB2C-5.

== Operators ==
Australia

- Royal Australian Air Force

France

- French Navy Aviation Navale

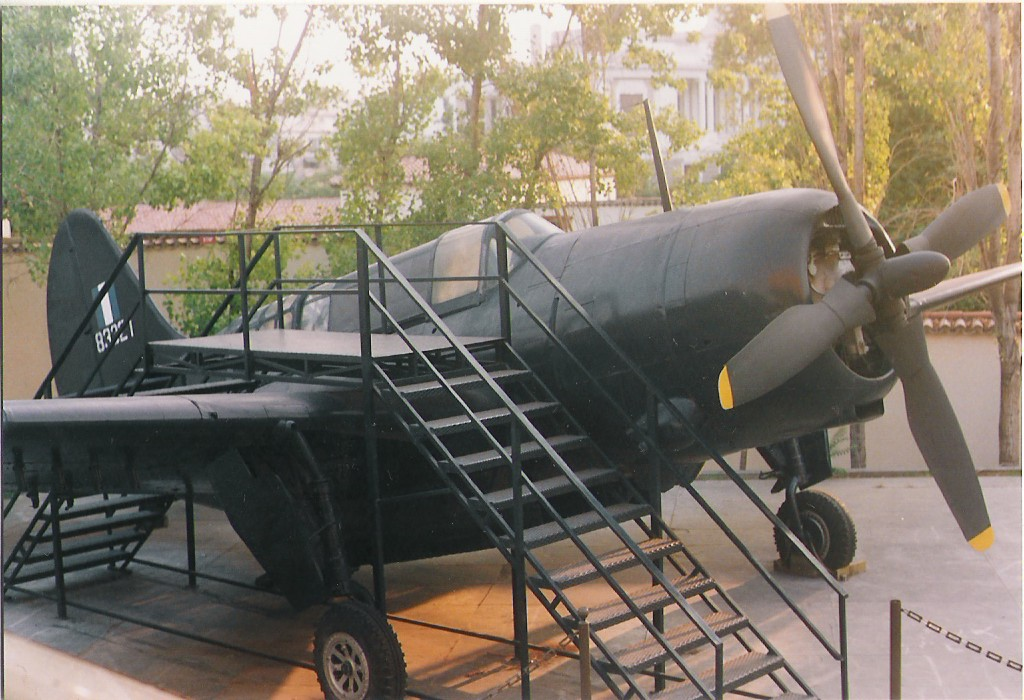
A preserved Greek SB2C-5.

Greece

- Royal Hellenic Air Force

Italy

- Italian Air Force operated 42 aircraft from 1950 until 1959

Portugal

- Portuguese Navy (until 1952)
- Portuguese Air Force (after 1952)

Thailand

- Royal Thai Air Force
- Royal Thai Navy

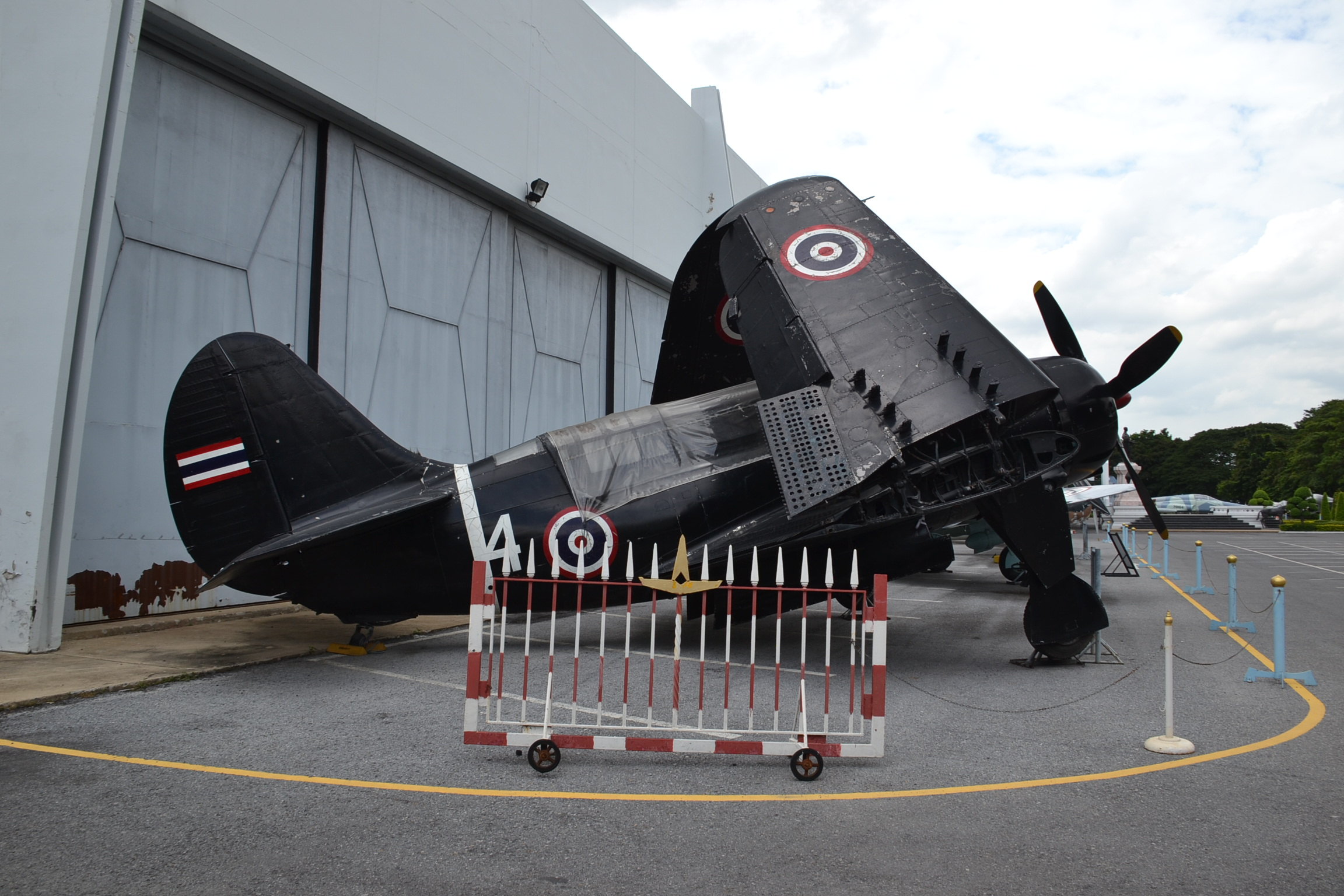
SB2C-5 at the Royal Thai Air Force Museum.

United Kingdom

- Royal Navy Fleet Air Arm

United States

- United States Army Air Forces
- United States Marine Corps
- United States Navy

== Surviving aircraft ==
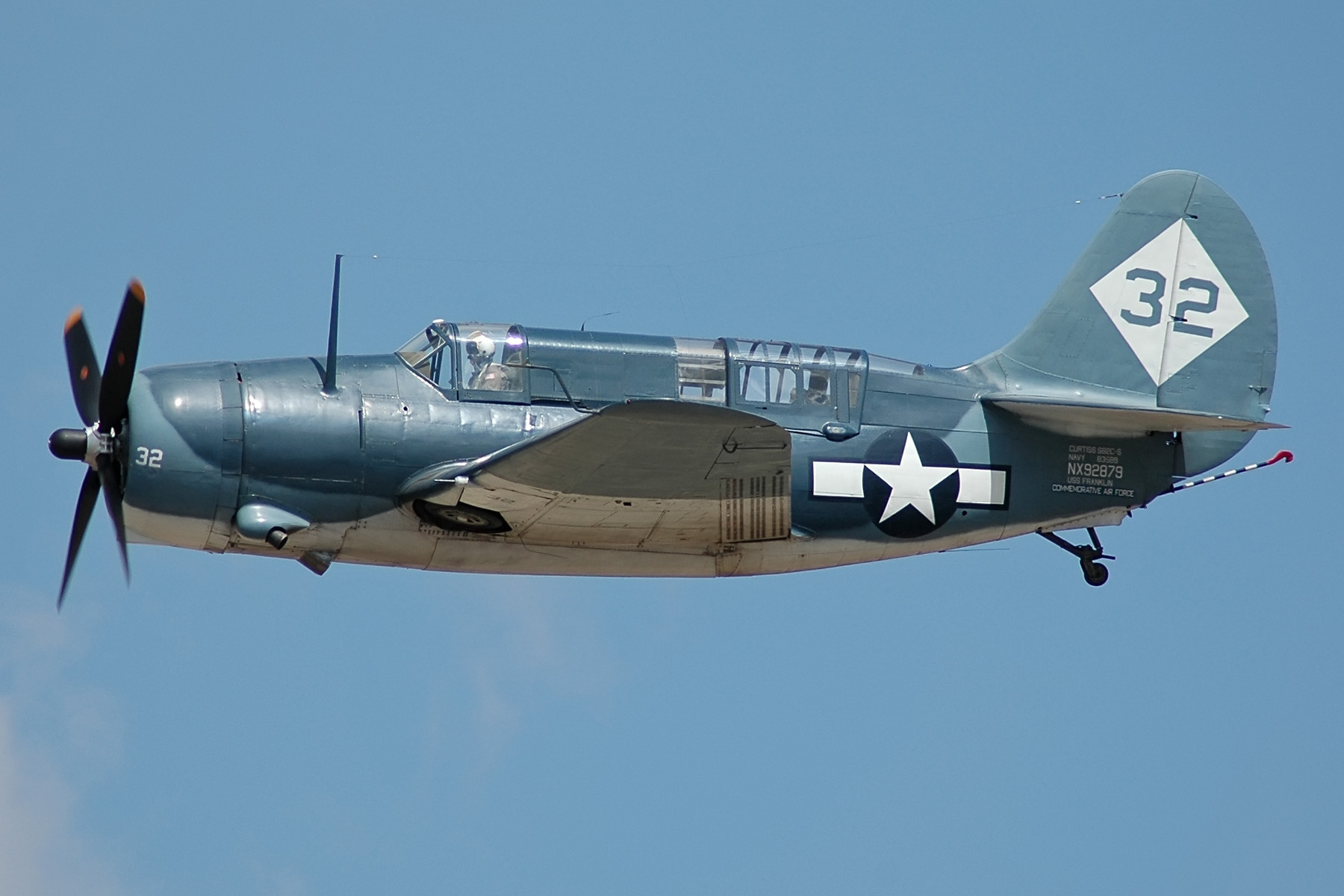
SB2C-5 of the Commemorative Air Force

NOTE: All surviving aircraft identified by original US Navy Bureau of Aeronautics (BuAer) Bureau Numbers (BuNo).

=== Greece ===
On display

SB2C-5

- 83321 - Hellenic Air Force Museum, Decelea Air Base.

=== Thailand ===
On display

SB2C-5

- 83410 - Royal Thai Air Force Museum, Don Muang Royal Thai Air Force Base, Bangkok.

=== United States ===
Airworthy

A-25A Shrike/SB2C-1A

- 75552 - based at the National Museum of World War II Aviation in Colorado Springs, Colorado.

SB2C-5

- 83393 - based at the Fagen Fighters WWII Museum in Granite Falls, Minnesota.
- 83589 - based at the Commemorative Air Force (West Texas Wing) in Houston, Texas. This late-production Helldiver, built in 1945, makes frequent airshow appearances. In 1982, it experienced engine failure and a hard emergency landing that caused extensive damage; volunteers of the CAF put in thousands of hours and spent in excess of $200,000 to restore the aircraft to flying condition once more.

On display

SB2C-5

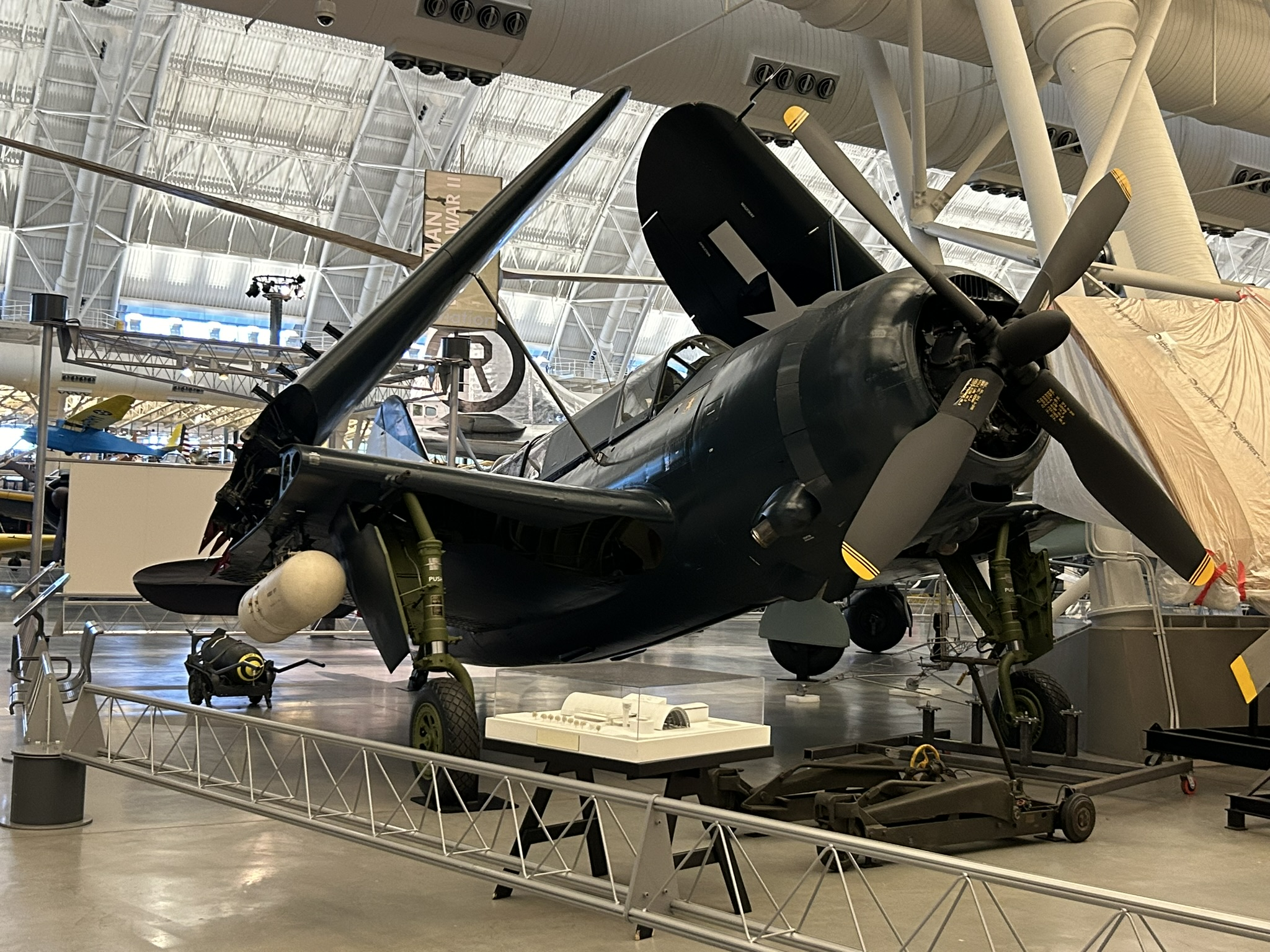
SB2C-5 Helldiver 83479 on display at the Steven F. Udvar-Hazy Center

- 83479 - Steven F. Udvar-Hazy Center of the National Air and Space Museum in Chantilly, Virginia.

Under restoration or in storage

A-25A Shrike/SB2C-1A

- 76805 - in storage at the USS Midway Museum in San Diego, California.

SB2C-3

- 19075 - to airworthiness at the Yanks Air Museum in Chino, California

SB2C-4

- 19866 - to display at the USS Midway Museum in San Diego, California. It crashed on 28 May 1945 in Lower Otay Reservoir, near San Diego, California after engine failure during a training exercise. Both pilot E.D. Frazer and his passenger escaped uninjured, but the Helldiver sank in 90 ft. of water. The aircraft was discovered in February 2010 by a fisherman and recovered on 20 August 2010 for restoration.

Wrecks

- A SB2C-4E Helldiver belonging to the United States Navy crashed and burned in foul weather on 9 October 1945, while en route from New Cumberland, Pennsylvania to its base at Naval Air Station Grosse Ile, Michigan after participating in Nimitz Day celebrations held in Washington, D.C. Pilot Frank Campbell and gunner George Cohlmia, both World War II veterans, were killed in the crash. The remains of the plane are still located at the crash site on Laurel Hill in Ligonier Township, Pennsylvania, three miles southeast of the village of Waterford.
- 18400 - In January 2010, a scuba diver discovered a SB2C-1C Helldiver that was ditched in Maalaea Bay off South Maui in August 1944. The Helldiver was covered in coral and was missing its tail section. The aircraft experienced problems with its empennage after dive bombing maneuvers which forced pilot Lieutenant William Dill to ditch. It lies in 50 ft of water facing east. The site, which is protected under state and federal law, is in the process of being marked with a plaque by the U.S. Navy. A mooring may be installed at a later point in time to facilitate dives on the site.
- On 19 December 2011 scuba divers discovered an SB2C Helldiver off the coast of Jupiter, Florida. The aircraft was mostly intact and was found inverted with the landing gear retracted. In May 2012, the US Navy conducted a survey of the aircraft, recovering a data plate from the horizontal stabilizer. The Naval History and Heritage Command's Underwater Archaeology Branch were attempting to determine if the numbers stamped on the data plate were readable to identify the aircraft.

SB2C-5

- 83414 - On 25 March 2010, the Oregon State Police, Tillamook County Sheriff's Office, and the United States Navy announced that during a logging operation near Rockaway Beach, Oregon, the wreck of an SB2C Helldiver was located. The wreckage was determined to be the remains of a 31 March 1948 crash. The plane had taken off from NAS Tillamook with a destination of Corpus Christie, Texas and the cause of the crash is unknown. The crash killed the pilot, Robert Smedley, whose remains were recovered shortly after the original crash. The remains of the aircraft are displayed at the Tillamook Air Museum as of 2025.

== Specifications (SB2C-4 Helldiver) ==
Curtiss SB2C Helldiver 3-view drawing

Data from United States Navy Aircraft since 1911

General characteristics

- Crew: 2
- Length: 36 ft 8 in (11.18 m)
- Wingspan: 49 ft 9 in (15.16 m)
- Height: 13 ft 2 in (4.01 m)
- Wing area: 422 sq ft (39.2 m^{2})
- Airfoil: root: NACA 23017; tip: NACA 23009
- Empty weight: 10,547 lb (4,784 kg)
- Gross weight: 16,616 lb (7,537 kg)
- Powerplant: 1 × Wright R-2600-20 Twin Cyclone 14-cylinder air-cooled radial piston engine, 1,900 hp (1,400 kW)
- Propellers: 4-bladed constant-speed propeller

Performance

- Maximum speed: 295 mph (475 km/h, 256 kn) at 16,700 ft (5,100 m)
- Cruise speed: 158 mph (254 km/h, 137 kn)
- Combat range: 1,165 mi (1,875 km, 1,012 nmi) with 1,000 lb (450 kg) bomb-load
- Service ceiling: 29,100 ft (8,900 m)
- Rate of climb: 1,800 ft/min (9.1 m/s)

Armament

- Guns:
  - 2 × 20 mm (0.787 in) AN/M2 cannon in the wings
  - 2 × 0.30 in (7.62 mm) M1919 Browning machine guns in the rear cockpit
  - 4 X 0.50 in (12.7 mm) M2 Browning machine guns, two each in gunpods mounted on underwing hardpoints (optional)
- Rockets: 8 × 5 in (127 mm) High Velocity Aircraft Rockets
- Bombs: in internal bay: 2,000 lb (910 kg) of bombs or 1 × Mark 13-2 torpedo
  on underwing hardpoints: 500 lb (230 kg) of bombs each

== See also ==
Related development

- Curtiss SBC Helldiver
- Curtiss XSB3C
- Curtiss XBT2C

Aircraft of comparable role, configuration, and era

- Aichi B7A
- Brewster SB2A Buccaneer/Bermuda
- Douglas A-33
- Douglas BTD Destroyer
- Fairey Barracuda
- Fairey Fulmar
- Junkers Ju 187
- Mitsubishi Ki-51
- Saab 17C
- Sukhoi Su-2
- Supermarine Type 322
- Vultee A-31 Vengeance
- Yokosuka D4Y

Related lists

- List of aircraft of World War II
- List of United States Navy aircraft designations (pre-1962)
- List of military aircraft of the United States
