= Museum of Flight (Georgia) =

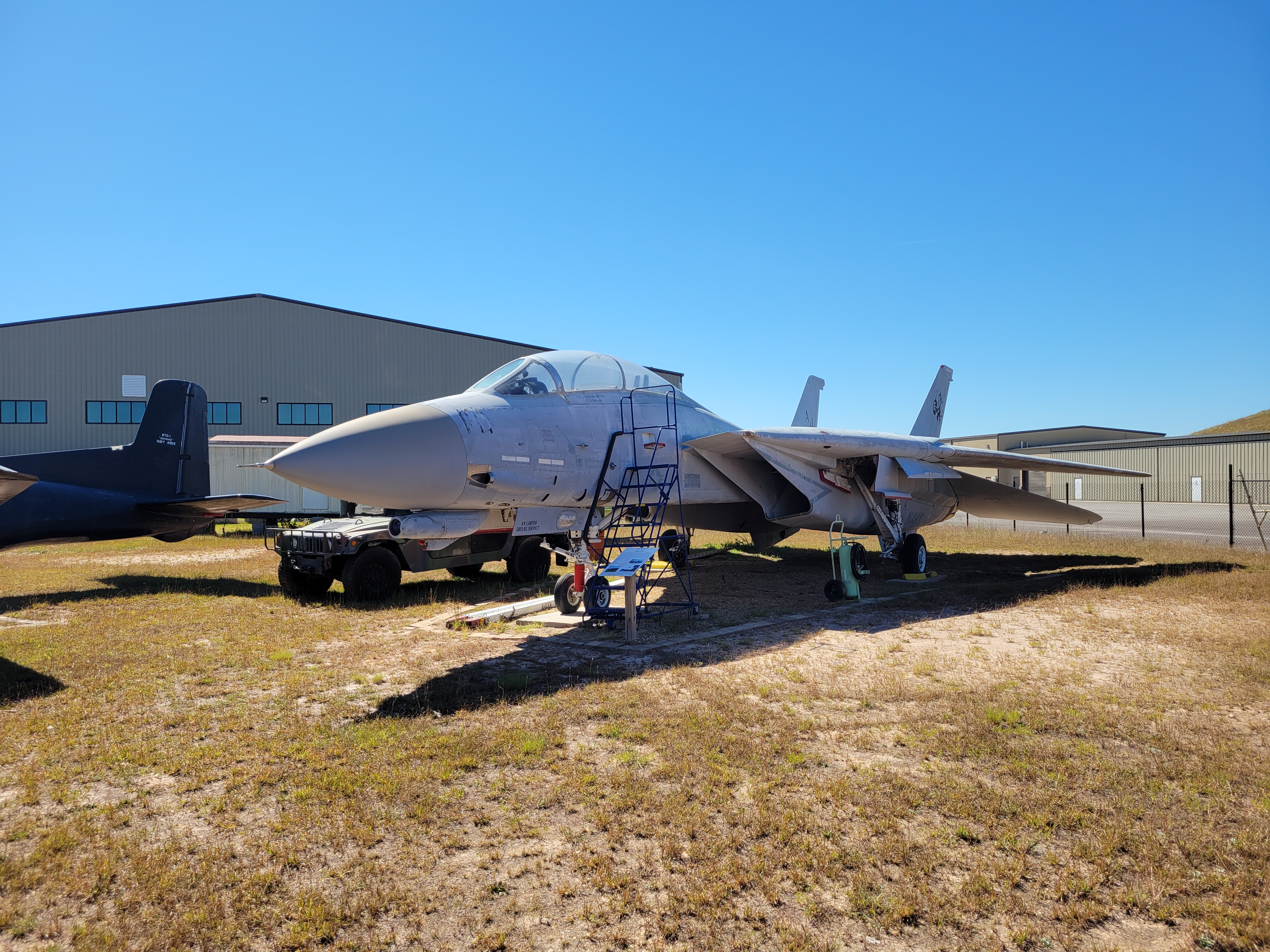
- F-14 Tomcat at the Paulding County Airport

- Location within Georgia Location within the United States
- Former name: Hixon Museum of Flight
- Established: 25 May 2010
- Location: Dallas, Georgia
- Coordinates: 33.9162°N 84.9423°W
- Type: Aviation museum
- Founder: Peter Eric "Wheeler" O'Hare
- Website: www.mofts.org

The Museum of Flight is an aviation museum located at the Paulding County Airport in Dallas, Georgia.

== History ==
The Hixson Museum of Flight opened at the Dallas Bay Skypark in Hixson, Tennessee on 25 May 2010. After outgrowing its facility, it moved to the Richard B. Russell Regional Airport in Rome, Georgia where it reopened on 26 March 2016. After signing a two-year lease for its existing hangar, the museum opened an outdoor display at the Paulding County Airport in Dallas, Georgia in 2020. The following year, it announced fundraising had resumed for the construction of a 12,000 sq ft (1,100 m^{2}) hangar at the airport.

== Collection ==
=== Aircraft ===
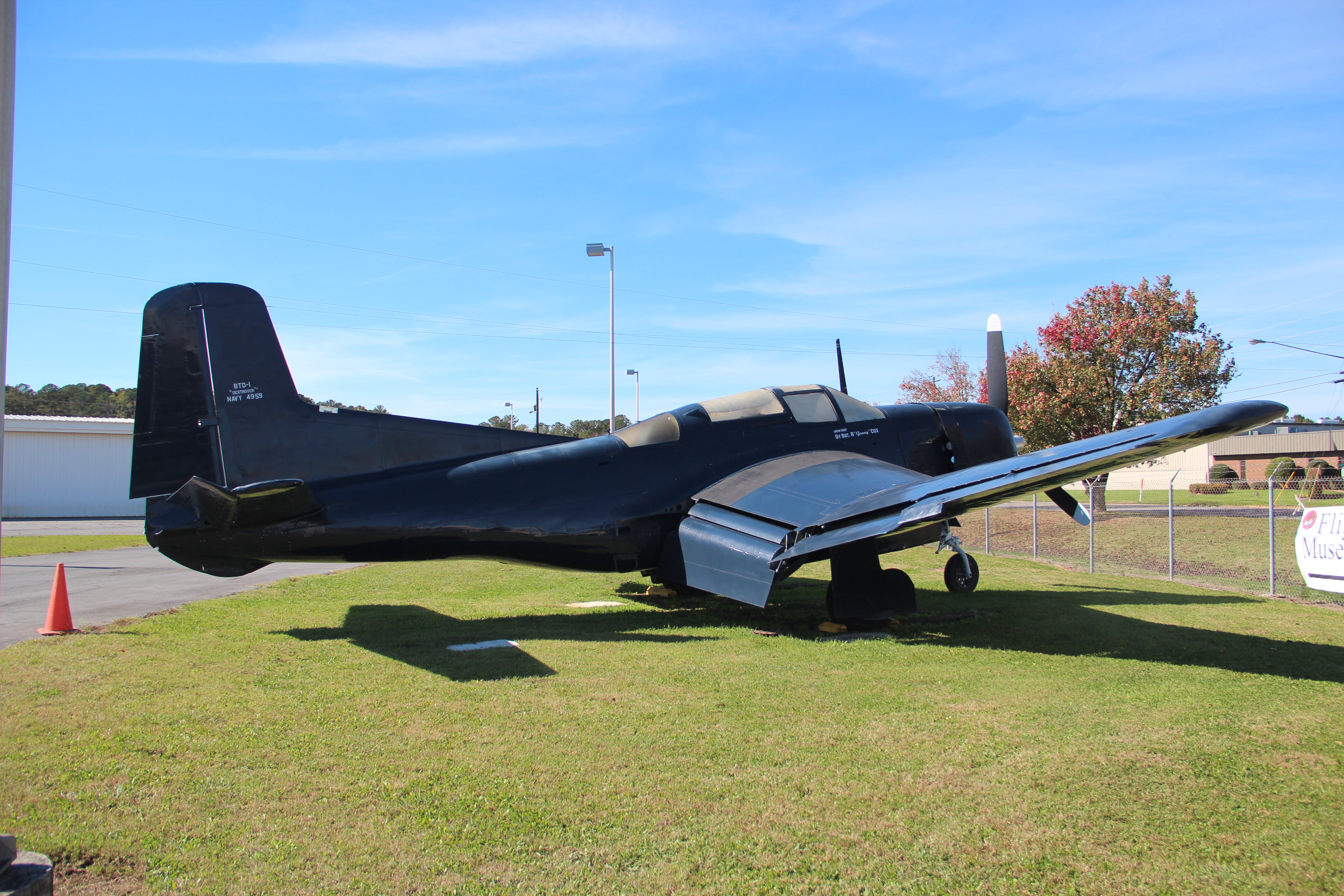
Douglas BTD Destroyer at the Richard B. Russell Airport

- Beechcraft C-45H Expeditor
- Beechcraft T-34C Turbo-Mentor
- Douglas BTD-1 Destroyer
- Grumman F-14 Tomcat
- North American T-28A Trojan
- North American T-28B Trojan

=== Ground vehicles ===
- 1978 Chevrolet Corvette
- M35
- M38A1
- M274
- Pettibone Mercury A-55 GT
