= Richard B. Russell Airport =

Airport in Georgia, US

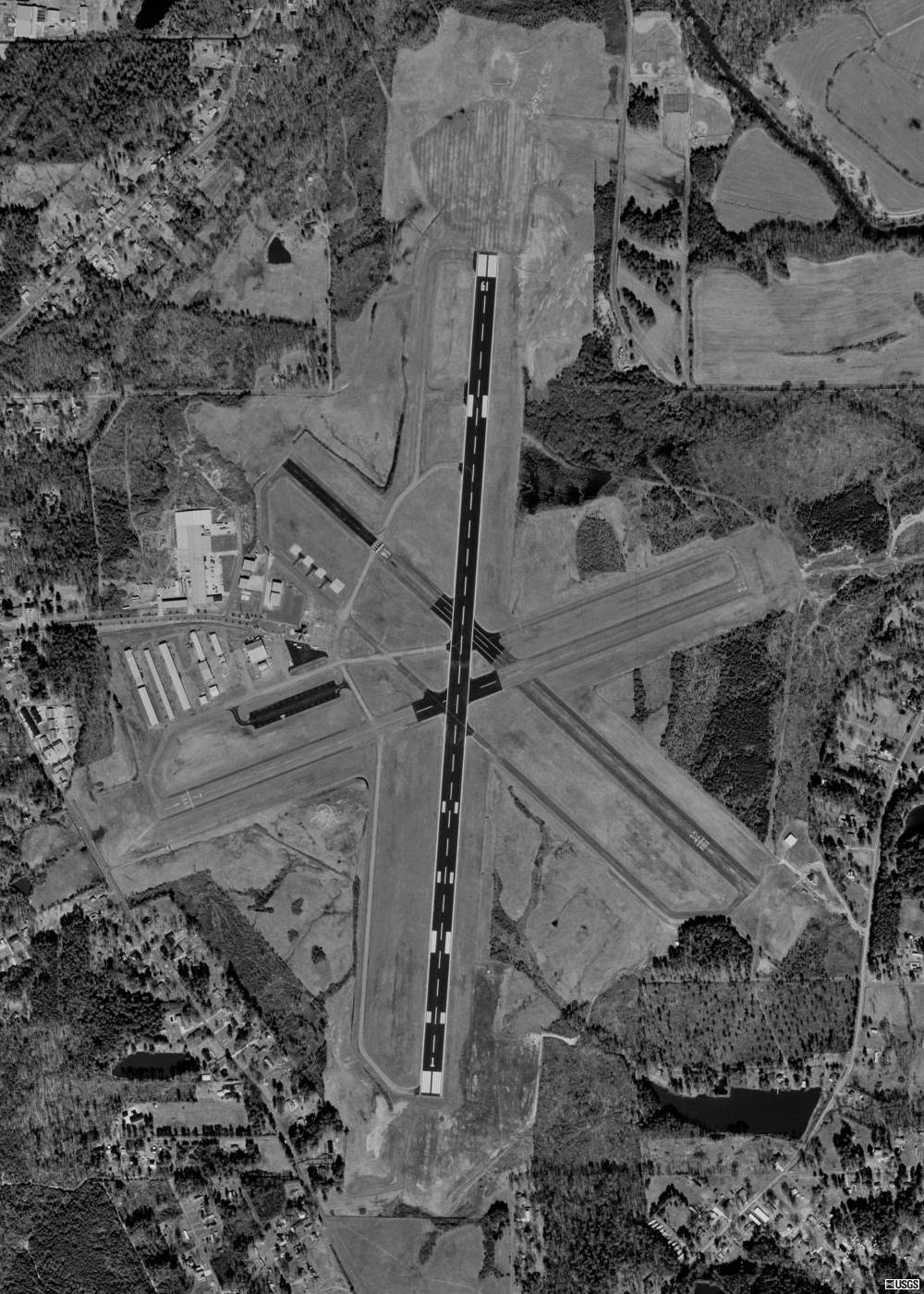
- USGS aerial image - 8 February 1999
- IATA: RMG; ICAO: KRMG; FAA LID: RMG; WMO: 72320

Summary
- Airport type: Public
- Owner: Floyd County
- Serves: Rome, Georgia
- Elevation AMSL: 644 ft (196 m)
- Coordinates: 34°21′03″N 085°09′31″W
- Website: https://russellregionalairport.com/
- Interactive map of Richard B. Russell Airport

Runways
| Direction | Length | | Surface |
| Direction | ft | m | Surface |
|---|---|---|---|
| 1/19 | 7,010 | 1,831 | Asphalt |
| 7/25 | 4,495 | 1,370 | Asphalt |

Statistics (2022)
- Aircraft operations: 61,000
- Based aircraft: 69
- Source: Federal Aviation Administration

Richard B. Russell Airport (IATA: RMG, ICAO: KRMG, FAA LID: RMG) is a county-owned public-use airport in Floyd County, Georgia, United States. The airport is located six nautical miles (11 km) north of the central business district of Rome, Georgia. It is also known as Richard B. Russell Regional Airport.

This airport is included in the FAA's National Plan of Integrated Airport Systems (2009-2013), which categorizes it as a general aviation facility.

The Rome Composite Squadron of the Civil Air Patrol is located at the airport. Stationed at the squadron are a Maule MT-7-235 tow plane and three Blanik gliders.

On the first Saturday of each month, the Experimental Aircraft Association hosts a fly-in breakfast at the EAA campgrounds located off the Old Dalton Road.

== History ==
Floyd County purchased 670 acres (271 ha) of land for the airport in 1942. The county turned the land over to the U.S. Navy which built three asphalt runways for a Naval Auxiliary Air Station. It was deeded back to the county in 1945, after the Navy discontinued its use of the site. The airport was then named for Richard B. Russell, Jr., who represented Georgia in the U.S. Senate from 1933 until his death in 1971.

Eastern Airlines served the airport with scheduled passenger service until the late 1960s. Eastern operated Convair 440 propliners with service to Atlanta, Nashville and St. Louis.

== Facilities and aircraft ==
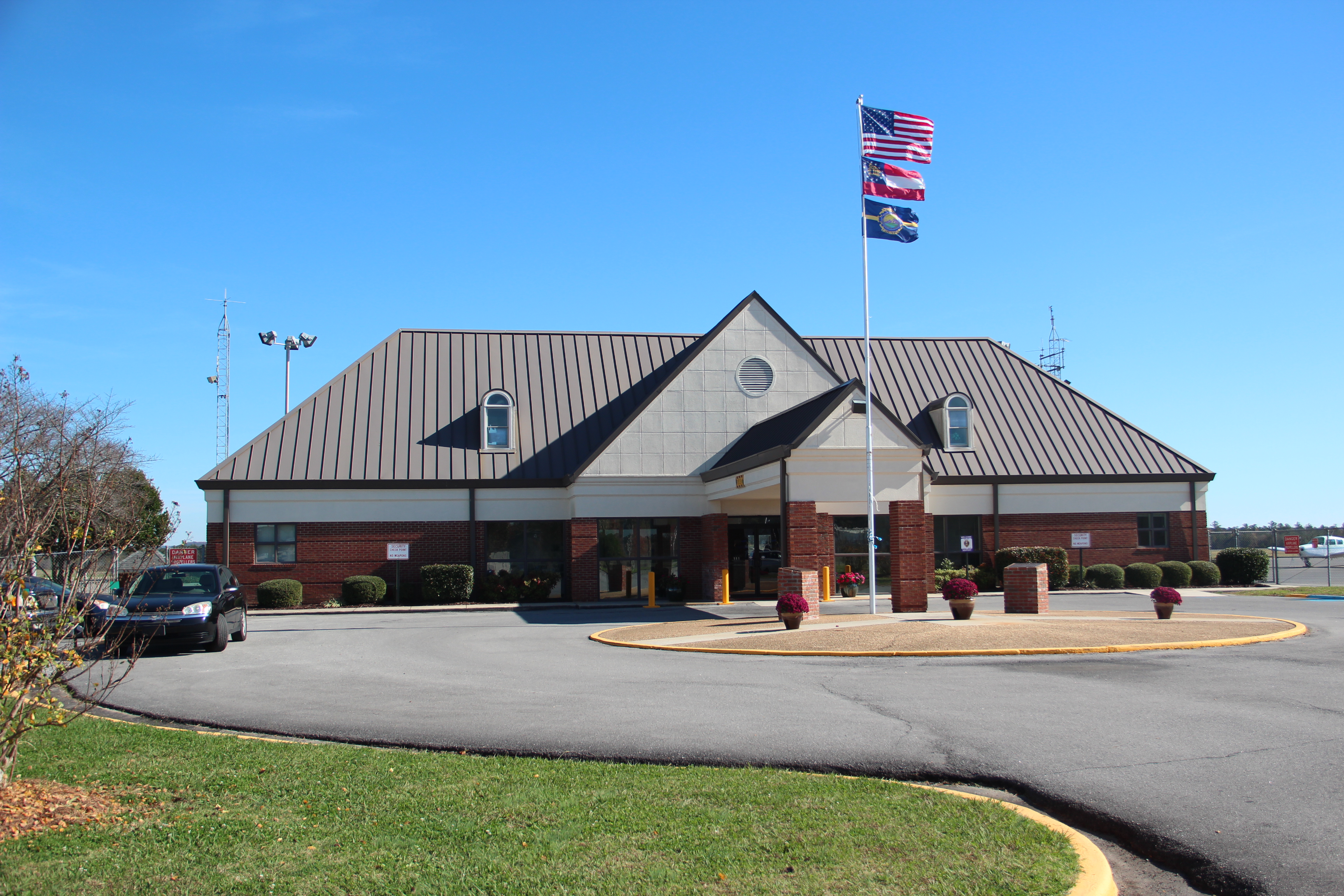
Terminal at Richard B. Russell Airport

The airport covers an area of 985 acres (399 ha) at an elevation of 644 feet (196 m) above mean sea level. It has two asphalt paved runways: 1/19 measures 7,007 by 150 feet (2,136 x 46 m) and 7/25 is 4,495 by 100 feet (1,370 x 30 m). A former third runway which was designated 14/32 is closed.

For the 12-month period ending December 31, 2022, the airport had 61,000 aircraft operations, an average of 167 per day: 98% general aviation and 2% military. At that time there were 69 aircraft based at this airport: 54 single-engine, 12 multi-engine, 1 ultralight, and 2 jet.

== Accidents near the airport ==
- On February 15, 1973, a Cessna 210 Centurion operated by Fountain City en route to Columbus Metropolitan Airport crashed 11 miles south of Rome following departure from the airport. All four occupants, including then mayor of Columbus, Georgia J.R. Allen, were killed on impact.
- On December 11, 1991, a Hawker 400 operated by Bruno's Inc. crashed 7.5 miles WSW of the airport into Lavender Mountain in VFR conditions. All nine occupants were killed.

== See also ==
- List of airports in Georgia (U.S. state)
