= Alexander Kartveli =

Georgian-American aircraft engineer (1896–1974)

Alexander Kartveli ალექსანდრე ქართველი
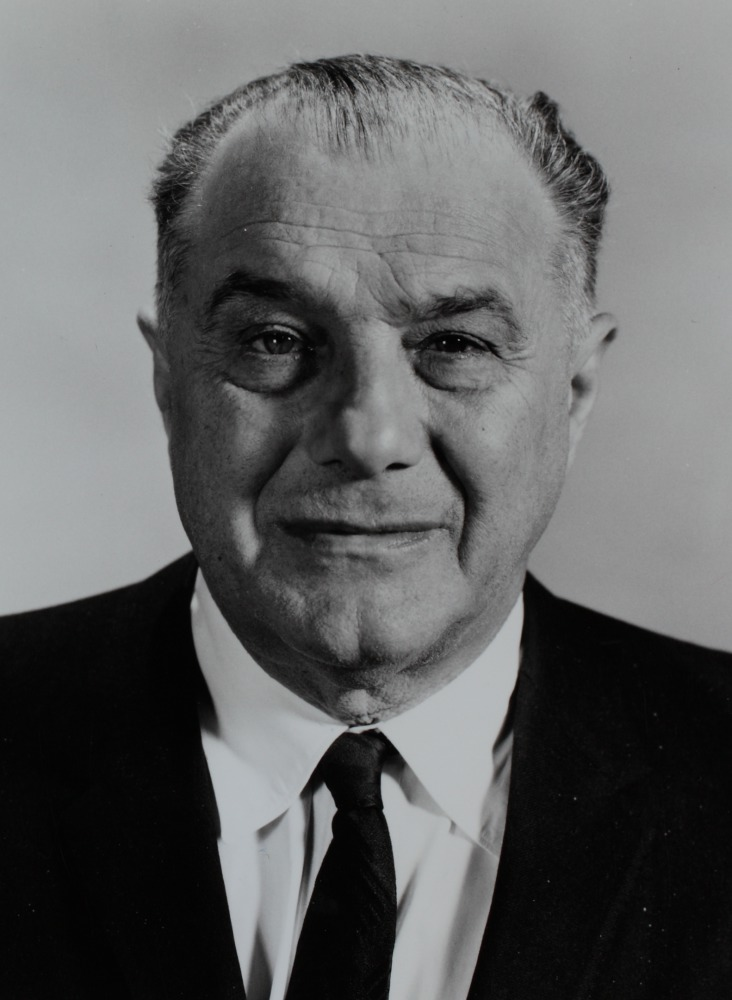
- Born: Aleksandre Kartvelishvili; 9 September 1896; Tiflis, Russian Empire (now Tbilisi, Georgia)
- Died: 20 July 1974 (aged 77); Huntington, New York, U.S.
- Citizenship: United States
- Education: Institut supérieur de l'aéronautique et de l'espace
- Occupation: Aircraft engineer
- Engineering career
- Discipline: Aeronautical engineering
- Employer: Republic Aviation
- Projects: P-47 Thunderbolt; F-84 Thunderjet; F-105 Thunderchief; A-10 Thunderbolt II

Alexander Kartveli, born Aleksandre Kartvelishvili, (Georgian: ალექსანდრე ქართველიშვილი; September 9, 1896 – July 20, 1974) was a Georgian-American aeronautical engineer and an aviation pioneer in the United States. Kartveli achieved important breakthroughs in military aviation in the time of turbojet fighters.

== Education and early career ==
Alexander Kartvelishvili was born in Tbilisi, Georgia, which was part of the Russian Empire at that time; into a noble Georgian family. (Georgians call themselves "kartvelebi", and his surname derives from "Kartveli", or Georgian). He graduated from the grammar school in Tbilisi in 1914. Later on, he decided to move to France, as one of several aviation engineer aspirants of Georgian origin, such as Michael Gregor.

Kartvelishvili graduated in 1922 from the Institut supérieur de l'aéronautique et de l'espace in Paris. He began working as a test pilot but was seriously injured during a test flight which ended the short-lived career. In 1922–1927, he worked for a while at the Louis Blériot company and designed the Bernard and Ferbois aircraft. In 1924, one of his aircraft established a world speed record.

In 1927, the American millionaire Charles Levine invited Kartvelishvili to New York, to join the Atlantic Aircraft Corporation in 1928 and in 1931 Kartvelishvili met the prominent engineer Alexander de Seversky, who was born in Georgia but was of Russian descent. In Seversky's company, which later was renamed Seversky Aircraft Corporation, Kartvelishvili worked as chief engineer. In 1939 the company again changed its name to "Republic Aviation Company".

== Seversky Corporation ==
Kartvelishvili and Seversky worked on a series of new designs. During World War II the first projects resulted in the P-35 and one of the most effective US fighter aircraft of World War 2, the Republic P-47. The new fighter aircraft was a clear improvement over the comparatively lightly armed Seversky P-35.

After Kartvelishvili immigrated to the United States, Seversky almost immediately hired his fellow immigrant as chief engineer, and Kartveli quickly proceeded to design a number of very advanced aircraft, including the SEV-1XP, which outperformed the Curtiss P-36 Hawk during a 1936 Army Air Corps competition and served as a necessary step in developing all-metal aircraft. Known by the military designation Seversky P-35, it was the first modern US Army fighter, incorporating a metal fuselage, low-set wings, retractable landing gear and a radial engine. A different concept called Seversky SEV-3, a floatplane fitted with retractable wheels, failed to win a volume order, but the Seversky Corporation succeeded with selling a subsequent trainer model, the BT-8

== Republic Aviation Company ==
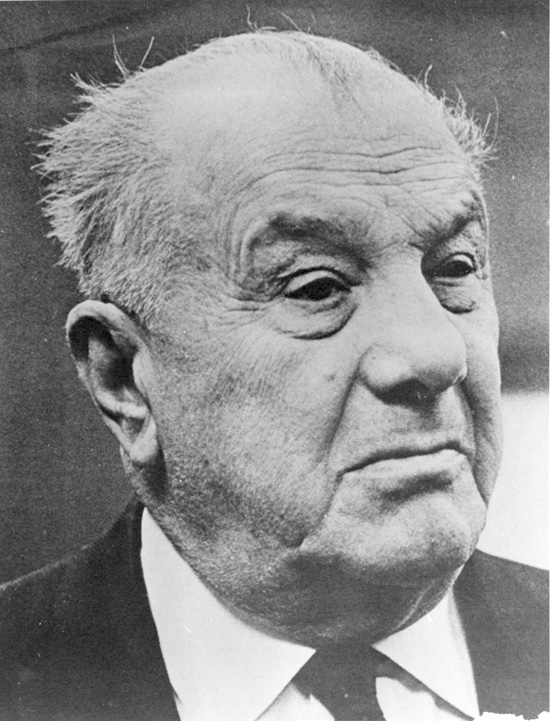
Alexander Kartveli

In 1939, Seversky was removed as head of his company and the Republic Aviation Company was born. The first major aircraft to emerge from the new company was the P-47, using a new innovative design of Kartveli. Two concept works named XP-44 and XP-47 were developed but dropped as they did not meet the requirements of the Air Corps. According to records, Kartveli was called in from the Experimental Aircraft Division of the USAAC and informed about the prototypes being cancelled. During his return to New York on a train, he took a sheet of paper and drew a completely new design. The new aircraft was intended to break the back of the German Luftwaffe. The famous P-47 Thunderbolt with its robust characteristics was born. More than 15,000 P-47s were constructed. Despite some flaws, the heavily armed and extremely sturdy aircraft achieved more than Kartveli could hope. At the end of the war Kartveli designed a sleek flying photo lab called the Republic XF-12, initially planned as a four-engine postwar transport; American Airlines canceled its orders and only two prototypes were built for the US Air Force.

Shortly after the end of World War II new concept of turbojet fighters emerged. The F-84 Thunderjet which Kartveli had already developed in 1944, was going into serial production in 1946. Soon he also added the swept-wing variant Republic F-84F Thunderstreak. A total of 10,000 of these new generation aircraft were constructed. He later led the team that developed the F-105 Thunderchief. He was also heavily involved with a 1960s-era Air Force project called "Aerospaceplane", to design and build an orbital logistics vehicle a decade before NASA attempted a similar concept, known as the Space Shuttle. The radical turboramjet-powered XF-103 was another stillborn Kartveli design, a victim of the propulsion community not being able to produce a suitable engine to power the Mach 3 interceptor. Kartveli contributed significantly to the science of flight and the readiness of the US military, and was involved in designing and leading of various projects. He was also consultant at Fairchild Republic and was the primary designer of the A-10 Thunderbolt II.

== Major projects ==
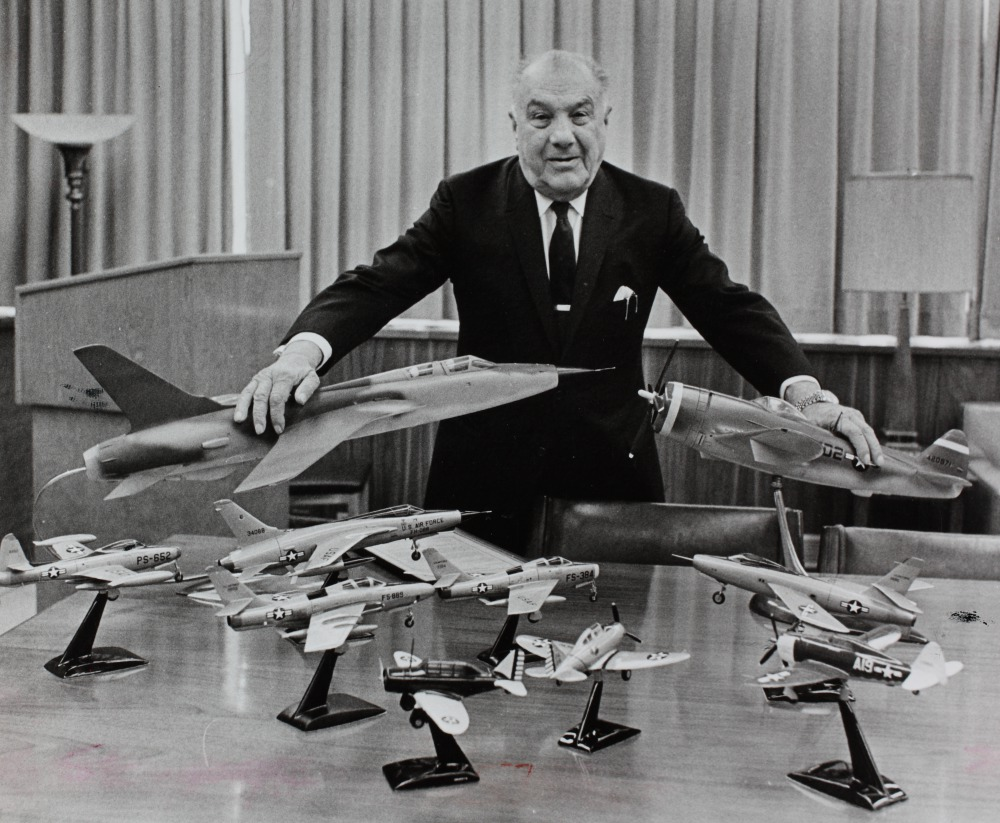
Kartveli with aircraft models of his designs

=== P-47 Thunderbolt ===
The Republic P-47 was Alexander Kartveli's brainchild and the successor to a line of airplanes derived from the Seversky P-35, the XP-41, P-43 Lancer and XP-44 Rocket. The P-47 design team headed by Kartveli originally presented a design that was to be powered by a 1,150 hp Allison V-1710-39 engine with an armament of only two 0.50 inch machine guns. A contract was awarded by the USAAC in November 1939, and for an even lighter XP-47A, but as intelligence was coming back from the war in Europe, it was becoming apparent that the performance goals of the XP-47 program were already inadequate. The USAAC issued new requirements which included:

1. Airspeed of 400 mph at 25,000 feet
2. Armament of six .50 caliber machine guns, preferably eight
3. Armor plating to protect the pilot
4. Self-sealing fuel tanks
5. A minimum of 315 gallons of fuel

The USAAC notified Kartveli that the XP-47A and the XP-44 Rocket contracts were canceled, since the P-43/XP-44 airframe was too small to meet the new requirements. (The XP-44 Rocket was based on the P-43 Lancer airframe with an even more powerful radial engine and never made it past the mock-up stage.) Kartveli then took the Seversky AP-4, a daring concept with the exhaust-driven turbocharger in the rear fuselage belly, and quickly prepared a rough sketch of a new XP-47B prototype. He planned to use the new 2,000 hp Pratt & Whitney Double Wasp XR-2800-21, eighteen cylinder, two-row radial engine, which was the largest and most powerful aircraft engine ever developed in the United States. The new design would incorporate eight 0.50 inch machine guns, additional ammunition, increased fuel capacity, and armor protection for the pilot. (The final fuel load was slightly under the capacity required, but this was overlooked as the aircraft met performance specifications.) Additionally, the airplane would include an efficient super-charging duct system that would offer the least interrupted airflow. Kartveli therefore adopted the unorthodox method of designing this feature first, and then building up the fuselage around it. Despite the fact that the supercharger was in the tail and the engine was in the nose, the arrangement worked quite well, providing a system that was durable and less susceptible to battle damage.

One of the most important features of the P-47 was its remarkable acceleration when the aircraft was put into a dive. Any plane that attempted to break off contact by going into a dive would soon be overcome by the remarkable speed of the P-47. Once the P-47 caught up to its prey, one burst from its eight 0.50 machine guns would obliterate anything it hit.

=== F-84 Thunderjet/F-84F Thunderstreak ===
In 1944, Kartveli began working on a turbojet-powered replacement for the P-47 Thunderbolt piston-engined fighter. The initial attempts to redesign the P-47 to accommodate a jet engine proved futile due to the large cross-section of the early centrifugal compressor turbojets. Instead, Kartveli and his team designed a brand-new aircraft with a streamlined fuselage largely occupied by an axial compressor turbojet engine and fuel stored in rather thick unswept wings. On September 11, 1944, the United States Army Air Force released General Operational Requirements for a day fighter with a top speed of 600 mph (521 knots, 966 km/h), combat radius of 705 miles (612 nm, 1,135 km), and armament of either six 0.50 inch (12.7 mm) or four 0.60 inch (15.2 mm) machine guns. In addition, the new aircraft had to use the General Electric TG-180 axial turbojet which entered production as the Allison J35.

On November 11, 1944, Republic received an order for three prototypes of the new XP-84. Since the design promised superior performance to the P-80 Shooting Star and Republic had extensive experience in building single-seat fighters, no competition was held for the contract. The name Thunderjet was chosen to continue the Republic Aviation tradition started with the P-47 while emphasizing the new method of propulsion. On January 4, 1945, even before the aircraft took to the air, the USAAF expanded its order to 25 service test YP-84A and 75 production P-84B (later modified to 15 YP-84A and 85 P-84B). Meanwhile, wind tunnel testing by the National Advisory Committee for Aeronautics revealed longitudinal instability and buckling of stabilizer skin at high speeds. The weight of the aircraft, a great concern given the low thrust of early turbojets, was growing so quickly that the USAAF had to set a gross weight limit of 13,400 pounds (6,078 kg). The results of preliminary testing were incorporated into the third prototype, designated XP-84A, which was also fitted with a more powerful J35-GE-15 engine with 4,000 pound-force (17.80 kN) of thrust.

The first prototype XP-84 was transferred to Muroc Army Air Field (present-day Edwards Air Force Base) where it flew for the first time on February 28, 1946, with Major William A. Lien at the controls. It was joined by the second prototype in August, both aircraft flying with J35-GE-7 engines producing 3,745 pound-force (16.66 kN) of thrust. The fifteen YP-84As delivered to Patterson Field (present-day Wright-Patterson Air Force Base) for service tests differed from XP-84s in having an upgraded J35-A-15 engine, carrying six 0.50 inch (12.7 mm) Browning M2 machine guns (four in the nose and one in each wing root), and having the provision for wingtip fuel tanks holding 226 US gallons (870 L) each. Due to delays with delivery of jet engines and production of the XP-84A, the Thunderjet had undergone only limited flight testing by the time production P-84Bs began to roll out of the factory in 1947. In particular, the impact of wingtip tanks on aircraft handling was not thoroughly studied, which proved problematic later.

After creation of the United States Air Force by the National Security Act of 1947, the Pursuit designation was replaced with Fighter, and P-84 became the F-84.

=== F-105 Thunderchief ===
The design of the F-105 Thunderchief began in the early 1950s as an internal project at Republic and was headed by Alexander Kartveli. Intended to be a replacement for the F-84 Thunderjet, the F-105 was created as a supersonic, low-altitude penetrator capable of delivering a nuclear weapon to a target deep within the Soviet Union. Led by Kartveli, the design team produced an aircraft centered on a large engine and able to achieve high speeds. As the F-105 was meant to be a penetrator, maneuverability was sacrificed for speed and low-altitude performance.

Intrigued by Republic's design, the US Air Force placed an initial order for 199 F-105s in September 1952, but with the Korean War winding down reduced it to 46 six months later. On October 22, 1955, the first YF-105A prototype flew, powered by a Pratt & Whitney J57-P-25 engine. Test flights with the YF-105A soon revealed that the aircraft was underpowered and suffered from problems with transonic drag. To counter these issues Republic replaced the engine with the more powerful Pratt & Whitney J75, altered the arrangement of the air intakes, and redesigned the F-105's fuselage.

The redesigned aircraft, dubbed the F-105B, proved able to achieve speeds of Mach 2.15. Also included were improvements to its electronics including the MA-8 fire control system, a K19 gun sight, and an AN/APG-31 ranging radar. With the alterations complete, the YF-105B first took to the sky on May 26, 1956. The largest single-engine fighter built for the US Air Force, the production model F-105B possessed an internal bomb bay and five external weapons pylons. The US Air Force planned to purchase 1,500 F-105s, however this order was reduced to 833 by Secretary of Defense Robert McNamara.

== Total list of projects ==
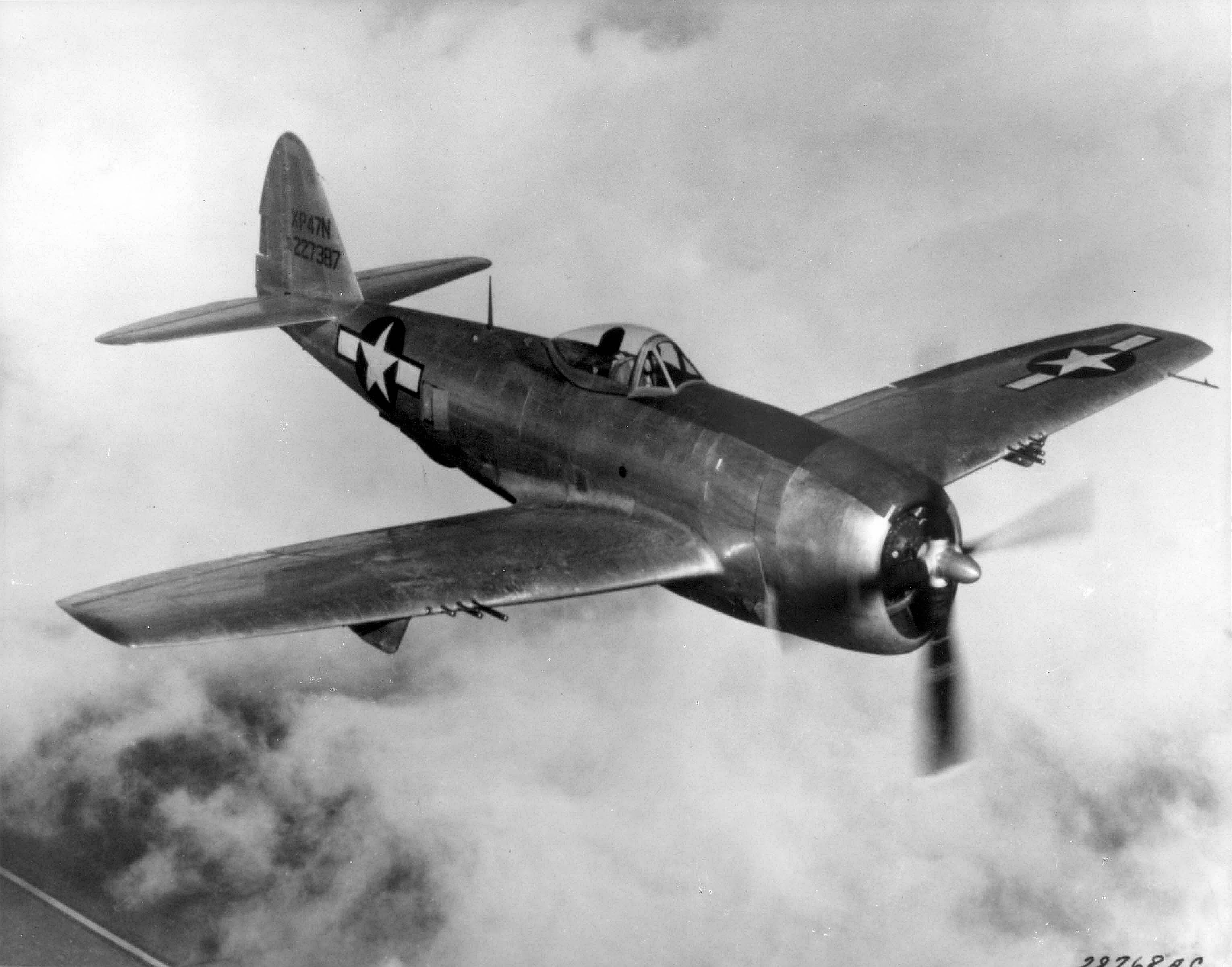
Republic P-47N Thunderbolt

- Bernard 191GR
- Ferbois aircraft
- Seversky P-35
- Seversky SEV-3
- Republic P-47 Thunderbolt
- Republic XF-12
- Republic XF-91 Thunderceptor
- Republic F-84 Thunderjet
  - F-84G
  - XP-84
  - XP-84A
  - YP-84A
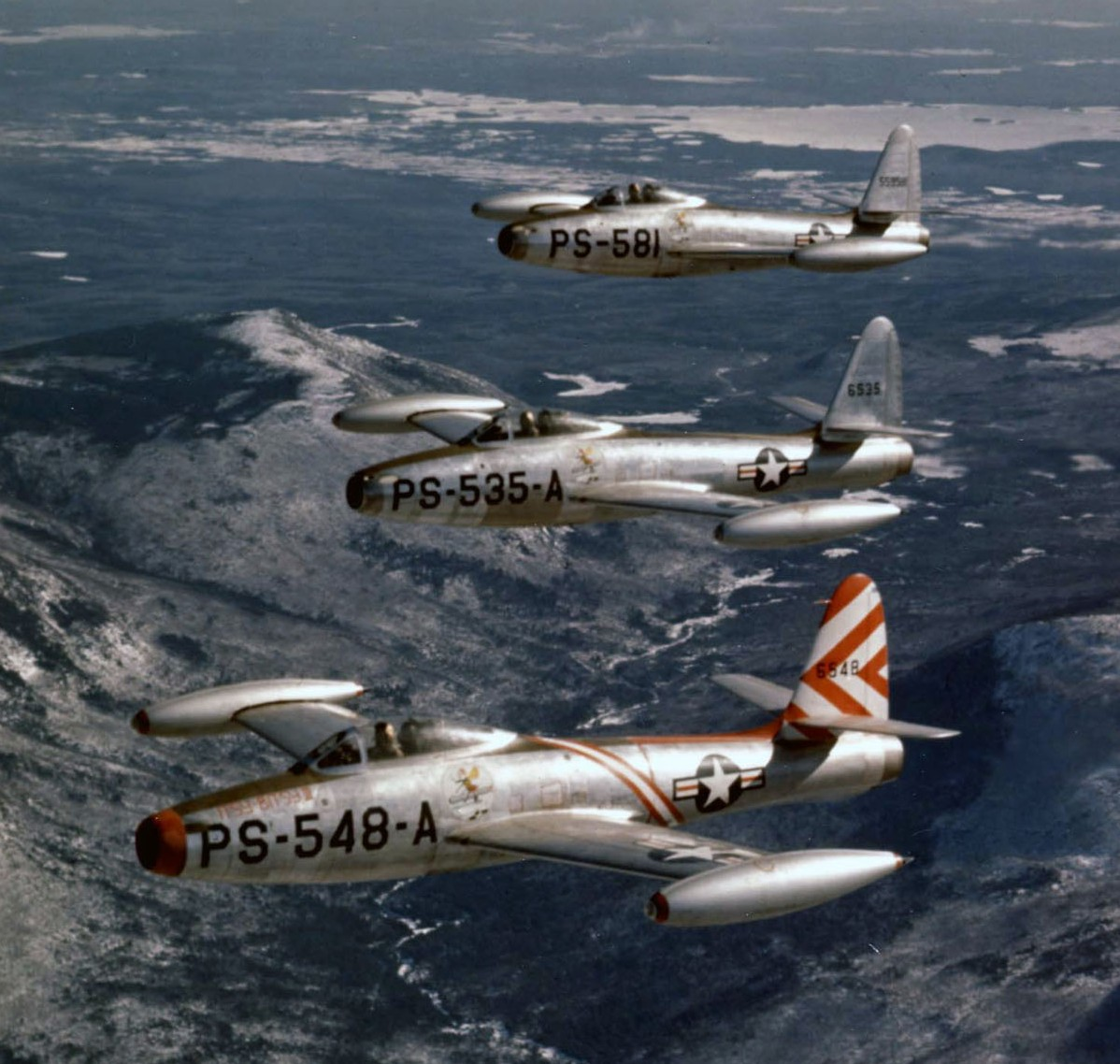
    Republic F-84 Thunderjet
  - F-84B
  - EF-84B
  - F-84C
  - F-84D
  - F-84E
  - EF-84E
  - F-84G
  - F-84KX
- Republic F-84F Thunderstreak
  - YF-84F
  - RF-84F
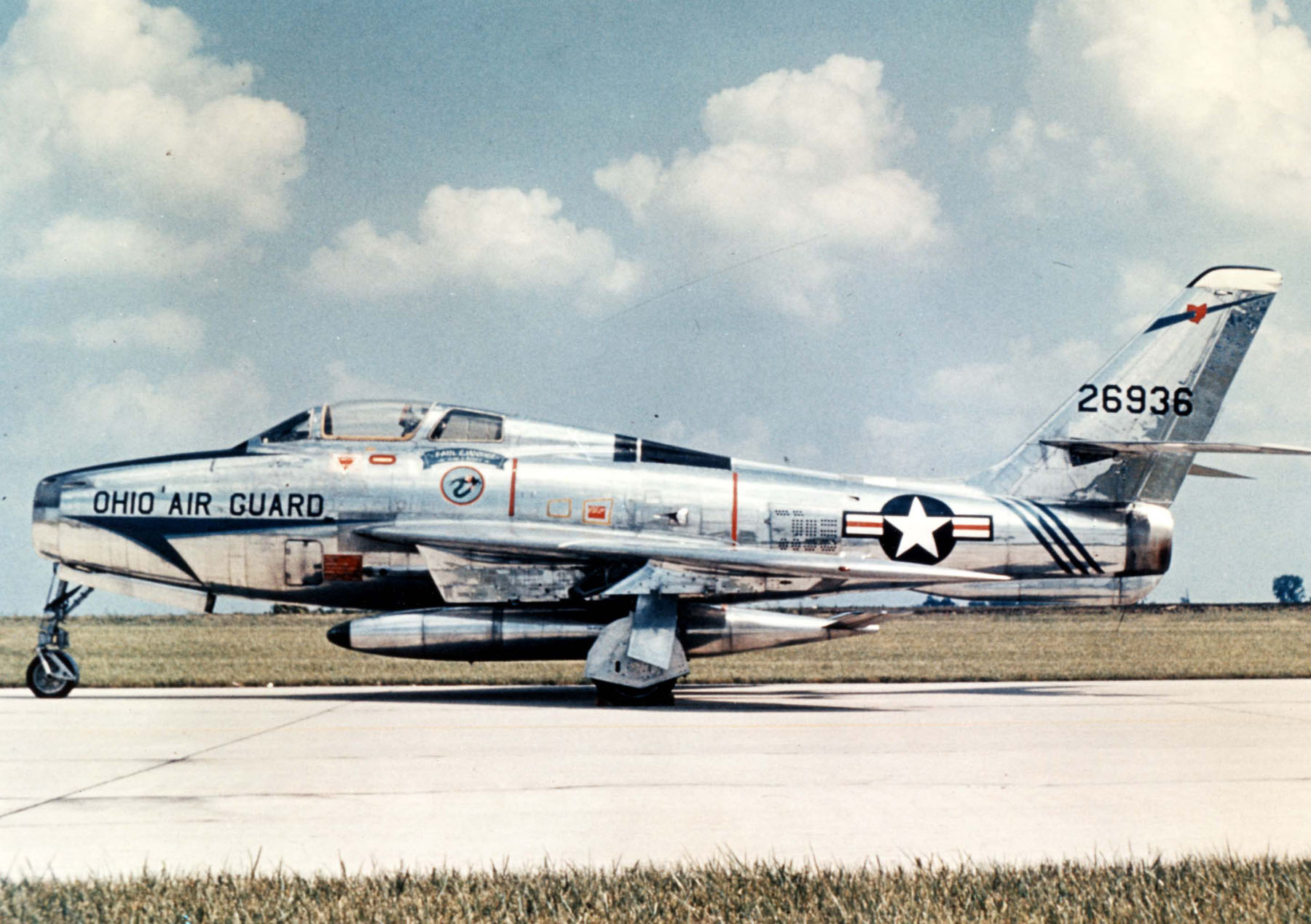
    Republic F-84F Thunderstreak
  - RF-84K
  - YF-84J
- Republic F-105 Thunderchief
- Rockwell X-30
- Republic XF-103
- Republic RC-3 Seabee
- Republic P-43 Lancer
- Republic XF-84H
- Republic AP-100
- A-10 Thunderbolt II

== Death ==
Alexander Kartveli died on July 20, 1974, at Huntington (Long Island) Hospital, New York, USA.

The announcement by the Fairchild Republic Company, where Mr. Kartveli had been chief engineer emeritus and was still active as a consultant, said he had apparently succumbed to a heart attack at his home in Huntington.

The airport in Batumi in Western Georgia carries his name.

== See also ==
- Georgy Beriev
- Aviation history
- Aeronautics
- Aerospace engineering
- Avionics
- List of Georgians
- History of Georgia (country)
