= Seversky A8V =

Version of the P-35 fighter built for the Japanese

A8V1 / AT-12
- A8V1 "Shiokaze-go" used by the Asahi Shimbun newspaper company

General information
- Type: Fighter
- National origin: United States
- Manufacturer: Seversky
- Primary users: Imperial Japanese Navy Air Service United States Army Air Corps; Swedish Air Force
- Number built: 70

History
- Introduction date: 1937
- First flight: 15 August 1935
- Retired: September 1952 (Sweden)
- Developed from: Seversky SEV-3

The A8V1 Type S Two Seat Fighter was an aircraft developed in the United States in the 1930s by Seversky Aircraft, purchased and operated in small numbers by the Imperial Japanese Navy Air Service.

== Design and development ==
The origins of the A8V trace back to the SEV-3, an amphibious aircraft that was the company's first design and which was developed into the BT-8 basic trainer for the United States Army Air Corps (USAAC). Seversky's chief designer, Alexander Kartveli, also proposed a two-seat fighter derivative, the SEV-2XP. This was powered by a 735-horsepower (548 kW) Wright R-1670 radial engine. It had fixed landing gear in aerodynamic spats and was armed with one 0.50 in (12.70 mm) and one 0.30 in (7.62 mm) forward-firing machine gun plus an additional 0.30 in machine gun for rear defence.

When the USAAC announced a competition for a new single-seat fighter in 1935, Seversky sent the SEV-2XP, confident it would win despite it being a two-seater. However, the aircraft was damaged on 18 June 1935 during its transit to the fly-off evaluations at Wright Field. The Air Corps delayed the fly-off until March 1936, which allowed Seversky time to rework the fighter into the single-seat SEV-1XP with retractable landing gear and re-engined with a Wright R-1820 radial engine. With further modifications, the SEV-1XP was ordered by the USAAC as the P-35.

Meanwhile, in what proved to be an unpopular move by Alexander de Seversky, twenty 2PA-B3s, a development of the SEV-2XP, were sold to the Imperial Japanese Navy Air Service, which briefly employed them in the Second Sino-Japanese War as the Navy Type S Two-Seat Fighter or A8V1 in the Navy’s aircraft classification system; they were found to be unsuitable for use as fighters and were reassigned to the reconnaissance role. Two were transferred to the Asahi Shimbun newspaper. After the US' entry into World War Two, the type was assigned the Allied codename Dick.

Two demonstrators ended up in the Soviet Union; although a manufacturing licence was also bought, the Soviets undertook no production.

Sweden ordered 52 2PAs (known as the B 6), but only two were delivered; as the Battle of France was ending in French surrender to Nazi Germany, on 18 June 1940 the United States declared an embargo against exporting weapons to any nation other than the United Kingdom and British Commonwealth countries. As a result, the remaining 50 were impounded in the US and put into service with the USAAC as the AT-12 Guardsman advanced trainer.

== Variants ==
2PA
Two-seat version of Seversky P-35 with rear gunner.

2PA-202 - European demonstrator (1)
2PA-A - for USSR (1)
2PA-B - European demonstrator (1)
2PA-BX - European demonstrator (1)
2PA-B3 - 20 production aircraft for Imperial Japanese Navy Air Service as Seversky A8V1.
2PA-L - for USSR (1)

A8V1
Japanese designation for 2PA-B3 (Allied codename "Dick" from 1942)
B 6
Swedish designation of the 2PA (only 2 delivered of 52 ordered)
AT-12 Guardsman
Two-seat advanced trainer for the USAAC (50 2PAs ordered by Sweden, but impounded)

== Operators ==
Japan

- Imperial Japanese Navy Air Service

Sweden

- Swedish Air Force

United States

- United States Army Air Corps

== Specifications (A8V1) ==
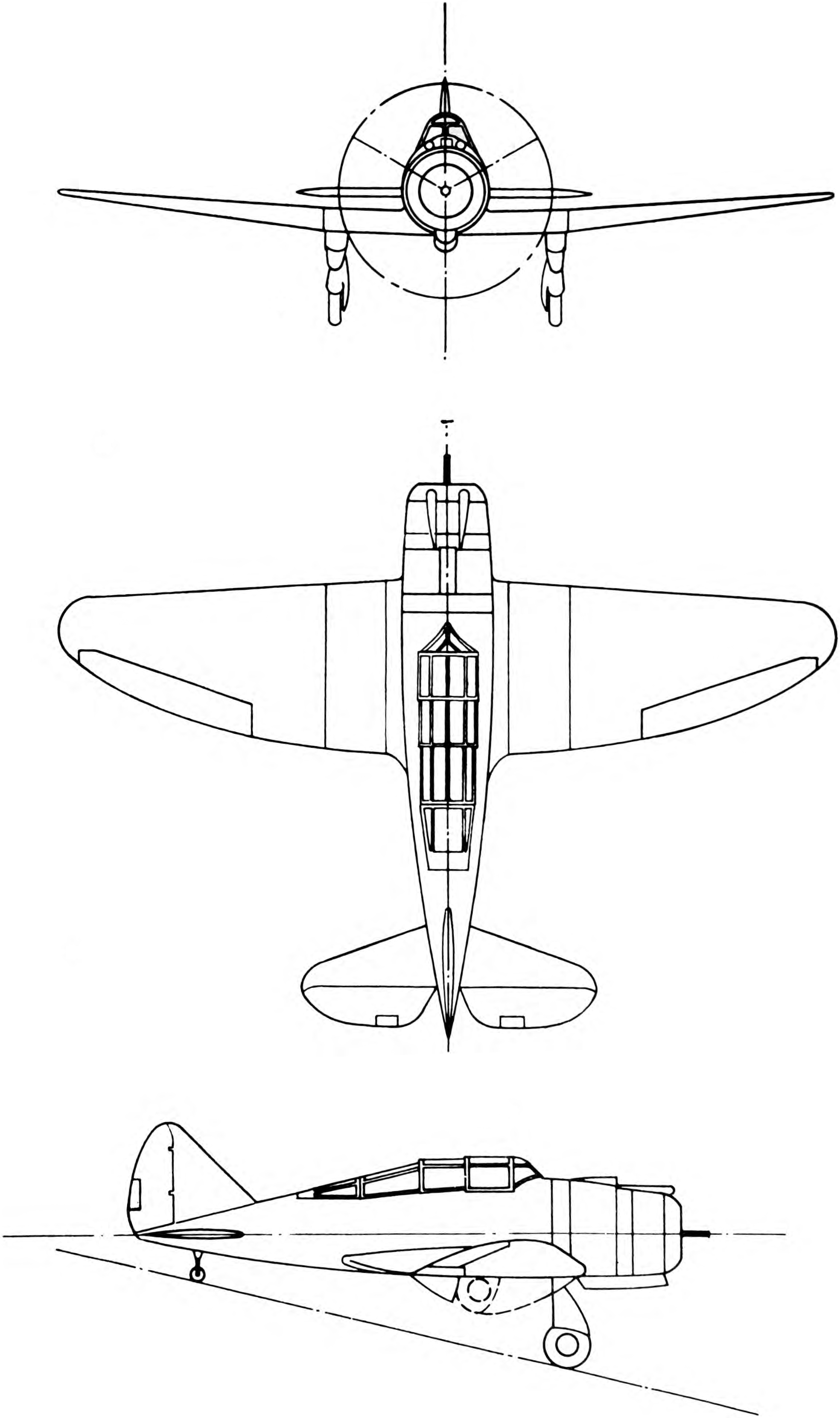
3-view drawing of the Seversky A8V

Data from

General characteristics

- Crew: two
- Length: 26 ft 11 in (8.2 m)
- Wingspan: 36 ft 0 in (10.97 m)
- Height: 9 ft 10 in (2.99 m)
- Wing area: 220.0 sq ft (20.44 m^{2})
- Empty weight: 4,581 lb (2,078 kg)
- Gross weight: 7,659 lb (3,474 kg)
- Powerplant: 1 × Wright R-1820 Cyclone radial piston engine, 1,000 hp (750 kW)

Performance

- Maximum speed: 316 mph (508 km/h, 274 kn)
- Range: 1,950 mi (3,138 km, 1,694 nmi)
- Service ceiling: 30,000 ft (9,100 m)

== See also ==
Related development

- Seversky P-35

Aircraft of comparable role, configuration, and era

- Blackburn Skua
- Boulton Paul Defiant
