= Alexander de Seversky =

Russian-American aviation pioneer (1894–1974)

- Александр Прокофьев-Северский
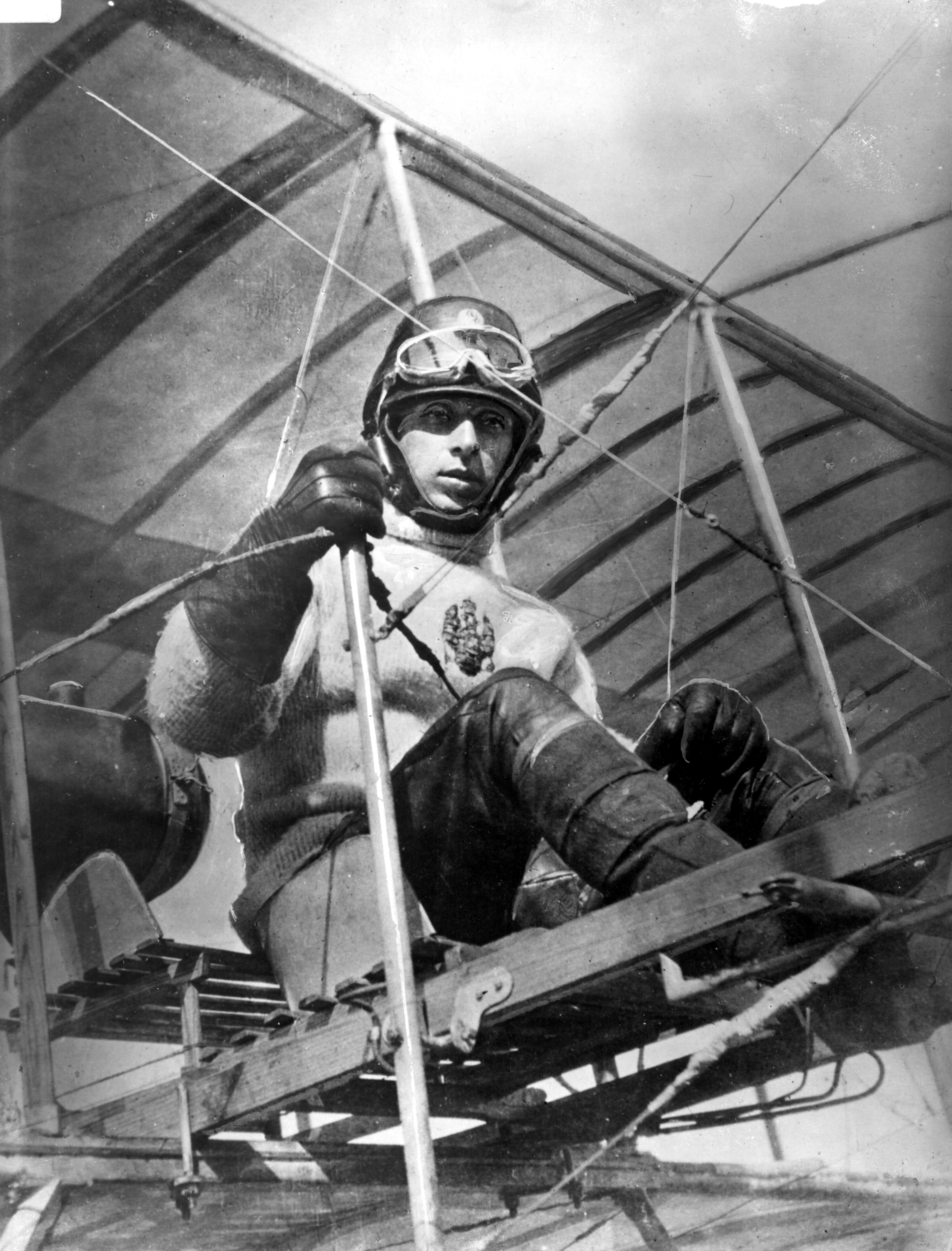
- Seversky, c. 1914
- Born: Aleksandr Nikolayevich Prokofyev-Seversky; 7 June [O.S. 26 May] 1894; Tiflis, Russian Empire
- Died: August 24, 1974 (aged 80); New York City, U.S.
- Resting place: Woodlawn Cemetery
- Occupations: Aviator; author; inventor
- Employer: Seversky Aircraft Corporation
- Military career
- Allegiance: Russia; United States
- Branch: Russian Naval Aviation; United States Army Air Corps
- Rank: Senior lieutenant (Russia); Major (United States)
- Conflicts: World War I

Alexander Nikolayevich Prokofiev de Seversky (Russian: Алекса́ндр Никола́евич Проко́фьев-Се́верский, romanized: Aleksandr Nikolayevich Prokofyev-Seversky; 7 June [O.S. 26 May] 1894 – August 24, 1974) was a Russian-American aviation pioneer, inventor, and influential advocate of strategic air power. He was also a World War I flying ace.

== Early life ==
Aleksandr Nikolayevich Prokofyev-Seversky was born in Tiflis in the Russian Empire (present-day Georgia) on June 7, 1894, to a Russian noble family. His father, Nicholas (Nikolai), was one of the first Russian aviators to own an aircraft (a modified Blériot XI built by Mikheil Grigorashvili). Alexander entered a military school at the age of 10. By the age of 14, when he entered the Imperial Russian Naval Academy, his father had already taught him how to fly. His father enlisted in the Imperial Russian Air Service and became a flight instructor. Graduating in 1914 with an engineering degree, Seversky held the rank of michman and was serving at sea with a destroyer flotilla when World War I began.

== World War I ==
Seversky was selected for duty as a naval aviator, transferring to the Military School of Aeronautics at Sevastopol, Crimea. After completing a postgraduate program on aeronautics in 1914–1915, he was reassigned as a pilot in the summer of 1915 to an aviation unit in the Baltic Fleet. While stationed in the Gulf of Riga, on his first mission, he attacked a German destroyer but was shot down by enemy anti-aircraft fire before he could drop his bombs. The bombs exploded in the crash, killing his observer and badly wounding Seversky. Doctors amputated his leg below the knee and although he was fitted with an artificial leg, despite his protests, authorities deemed him unfit to return to combat. To prove to his superiors that he could still fly, Seversky appeared unannounced at an air show. Following his impromptu spirited aerial performance, authorities arrested him.

Emperor Nicholas II intervened on his behalf, and in July 1916, Seversky returned to combat duty, downing his first enemy aircraft three days later. In February 1917, he assumed command of the 2nd Naval Fighter Detachment, until he was seriously injured in an accident where a horse-drawn wagon broke his good leg. After serving in Moscow, as the Chief of Pursuit Aviation, Seversky returned to combat duty. On October 14, 1916, he was forced down in enemy territory but made it back to the safety of his own lines. He went on to fly 57 combat missions, shooting down six German aircraft (his claims for 13 victories would make him Russia's third-ranking World War I ace, although the claims are disputed). Seversky was the leading Russian naval ace in the conflict. For his wartime service, Seversky was awarded the Order of St. George (4th class); Order of St. Vladimir (4th class); Order of St. Stanislaus (2nd & 3rd class); Order of St. Anne (2nd; 3rd; and 4th class). Nicholas II personally awarded him the Golden Weapon for Bravery. He was also promoted to the rank of starshy leytenant (senior lieutenant) in the Russian Naval Aviation.

== Emigration to United States ==
During the 1917 Revolution, Seversky was stationed in St. Petersburg and remained in uniform at the request of the commander-in-chief of the Baltic Fleet. In March 1918, he was selected as an assistant naval attaché in the Russian Naval Aviation Mission to the United States. Seversky departed via Siberia and while in the U.S., decided to remain there rather than return to a Russia torn apart by the revolution. Settling in Manhattan, he briefly operated a restaurant.

== Aviation career ==
In 1918, Seversky offered his services to the War Department as a pilot. General William Kenly, the chief of the Signal Corps, appointed him as a consulting engineer and test pilot assigned to the Buffalo District of aircraft production. After the armistice, Seversky became an assistant to air power advocate General Billy Mitchell, aiding him in his push to prove air power's ability to sink battleships. Seversky applied for and received the first patent for air-to-air refueling in 1921. Over the next few years, he would go on to make 364 patent claims, among them the first gyroscopically stabilized bombsight, which Seversky developed with Sperry Gyroscope Company in 1923. After joining the Army Air Corps Reserve, Seversky was commissioned a major in 1928.

=== Seversky Aircraft Corporation ===
Using the $50,000 from the sale of his bombsight to the U.S. government, Seversky founded the Seversky Aero Corporation in 1923. Concentrating on making aircraft parts and instruments, the small company was unable to survive the stock market crash of 1929. On February 16, 1931, with the backing of Wall Street millionaire Edward Moore and other investors, he resurrected the enterprise as the new Seversky Aircraft Corporation on Long Island, New York. Moving into the former EDO Aircraft Corporation's float plane factory at College Point, Long Island, Seversky's patents were the primary assets of the new company. Resolved to invest in research and design rather than relying on licence-manufacturing, many of Seversky Aircraft's designers were Russian and Georgian engineers, including Chief Engineer Michael Gregor and Alexander Kartveli. Along with Seversky, the designers embarked on an advanced all-metal, multi-place monoplane amphibian, the SEV-3. This ground-breaking design would go on to set numerous speed records at the 1933–1939 National Air Races, often piloted by Seversky himself, who was the company's greatest "pitchman". On September 15, 1935, flying at a speed just over 230 mph, Seversky set a world speed record for piston-engine amphibious aircraft. Seversky also set a transcontinental speed record in 1938.

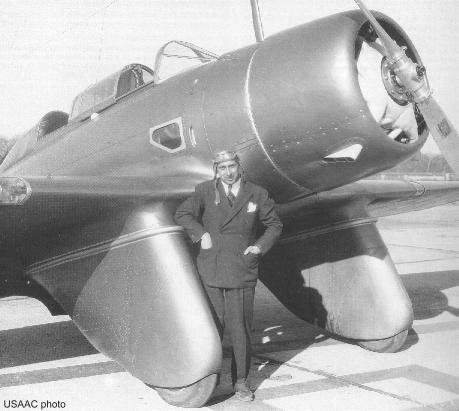
Alexander de Seversky standing before the SEV-3XAR, autumn 1934

The SEV-3 was eventually the progenitor of a family of advanced aircraft including the SEV-3XLR and 2-XP (two-place, experimental) fighter, the BT-8 trainer and SEV-1P (single-seat) fighter. The most radical conversion occurred when the fixed-gear SEV-1P was fitted with a rearward retracting main undercarriage to produce the prototype of the successful P-35A fighter series. The Seversky Aircraft design office led by Seversky was responsible for 25 different innovative projects, many of them "still-born" including the "Seversky Super-Clipper", an eight-engine, 250 ft span transoceanic transport and the four-place, tricycle gear "Seversky Executive" high speed personal aircraft. The Sev-S2, virtually identical to the P-35, which was undergoing trials in 1937, dominated the last three Bendix Trophy air races, beginning in 1937 when Frank Fuller won at an average speed of 415.51 km/h.

The Seversky Aircraft Company began operating out of new facilities on Long Island in 1936, purchasing three factories, a flying field and hangar along with a seaplane assembly base at Famingdale and Amityville, Long Island. Despite landing several government contracts, Seversky Aircraft was never able to turn a profit under Seversky's management and by September 1938, the company had to be bailed out again by Paul Moore (Edward's brother and heir). His financing of a rescue came with the proviso that Seversky, as President, would have his personal budget cut, while the board of directors transferred more power to managing director Wallace Kellett. A controversial contract Seversky negotiated in secret with the Japanese for 20 SEV-2PA-B3 fighters created antagonism with the War Department, leading inevitably to the U.S. government putting pressure on the USAAC to limit the P-35 order to the initial batch of 76 aircraft.

When Seversky left for Europe on a sales tour in the winter of 1938–1939, the Board reorganized the operation on October 13, 1939, renamed as Republic Aviation Corporation with Kellett becoming the new president. Seversky sued for redress but while legal actions dragged on, the board of directors voted him out of the company he had created. Republic Aviation would become an industrial behemoth during World War II designing and producing the Republic P-47 Thunderbolt and in postwar years, a continuing line of successful fighter aircraft before being acquired by Fairchild in 1965.

=== Air power advocate ===
As World War II approached, Seversky became engrossed in formulating his theories of air warfare. Shortly after the Attack on Pearl Harbor, he wrote Victory Through Air Power, published in April 1942, advocating the strategic use of air bombardment. The best-selling book (No. 1 on the New York Times bestseller list, appearing first in mid-August 1942 and remaining in first place for four weeks) with five million copies sold. The book's popularity and hard-hitting message led to Walt Disney adapting the book into an animated motion picture (1943) of the same name where Seversky (who also served as the film's technical consultant) provided live-action commentary. The Disney animated film received a lukewarm reception at the box office and from critics who felt it was an unusual departure from the standard Disney studio fare, sending out a powerful propaganda message based on an abstract political argument. The influence of both the book and film in wartime, however, was significant, stimulating popular awareness and driving the national debate on strategic air power.

Seversky was one of a number of strategic air advocates whose vision was realized in the 1946 creation of the Strategic Air Command and the development of aircraft such as the Convair B-36 and Boeing B-47 Stratojet. Seversky continued to publicize his ideas for innovative aircraft and weaponry, notably the 1964 Ionocraft which was to be a single-man aircraft powered by the ionic wind from a high-voltage discharge. A laboratory demonstration was acknowledged to require 90 watts to lift a two-ounce (60 g) model, and no man-carrying version was ever built.

In postwar years, Seversky continued to lecture and write about aviation and the strategic use of air power, following up his landmark treatise with Air Power: Key to Survival (1950) and America: Too Young to Die! (1961).

== Personal life ==
Seversky married New Orleans socialite Evelyn Olliphant (1907–1967) on June 23, 1925. She was also well known as a pilot. The two settled in New York City (at 40 Central Park South). In 1927, Seversky became a naturalized citizen of the United States. In 1967, Mrs. de Seversky died at her country home at Asharoken Beach, Northport, L.I. at the age of 60.

Often described as "flamboyant" and a "showman," Seversky was always good at capturing the public eye, and was considered a newsworthy celebrity. In 1942 The New York Times even published one of his residences, reporting that "Airplane Designer Rents Apartment: Major Seversky One Of Seven New Tenants in 40 Central Park South."

Seversky was a founder and trustee of the New York Institute of Technology, which in 1972 acquired an elegant mansion originally built by Alfred I. du Pont. It was renamed "The DeSeversky Center" in his honor, and is a popular venue for weddings.

Seversky died at Manhattan's Memorial Hospital on August 24, 1974, and was buried in the Woodlawn Cemetery in the Bronx. A Russian Orthodox service was arranged.

== Honors ==
He received the Harmon Trophy in 1939 for advances in aviation. For his work on air power, Seversky received the Medal for Merit in 1945 from President Harry Truman and the Exceptional Service Medal in 1969 in recognition of his service as a special consultant to the Chiefs of Staff of the USAF. In 1970, Seversky was enshrined in the National Aviation Hall of Fame. In 1972, he received the Golden Plate Award of the American Academy of Achievement.

== Books ==
- de Seversky, Alexander P. (1942) Victory Through Air Power, Simon & Schuster, ISBN 1-299-06704-2, 9781299067042
- de Seversky, Alexander P. (1950) Air Power: Key to Survival, Simon & Schuster
- de Seversky, Alexander P. (1961) America: Too Young to Die!, McGraw-Hill

== Seversky aircraft ==
Before the genesis of the Republic Aircraft Corporation, the Seversky Aircraft Corporation produced the following aircraft, which were all variations on the same theme:

- Seversky AT-12
- Seversky BT-8
- Seversky FN
- Seversky P-35
- Seversky XP-41
- Seversky 2PA
- Seversky A8V
- Seversky SEV-1XP
- Seversky SEV-3
- Seversky EP-106 (Export Pursuit)
- Seversky Navy Type S Two-Seat Fighter

== See also ==
- Seversky P-35
- Republic Aviation
- Ionocraft
