= TFX Program =

1961–62 American military aircraft program

Tactical Fighter Experimental (TFX)
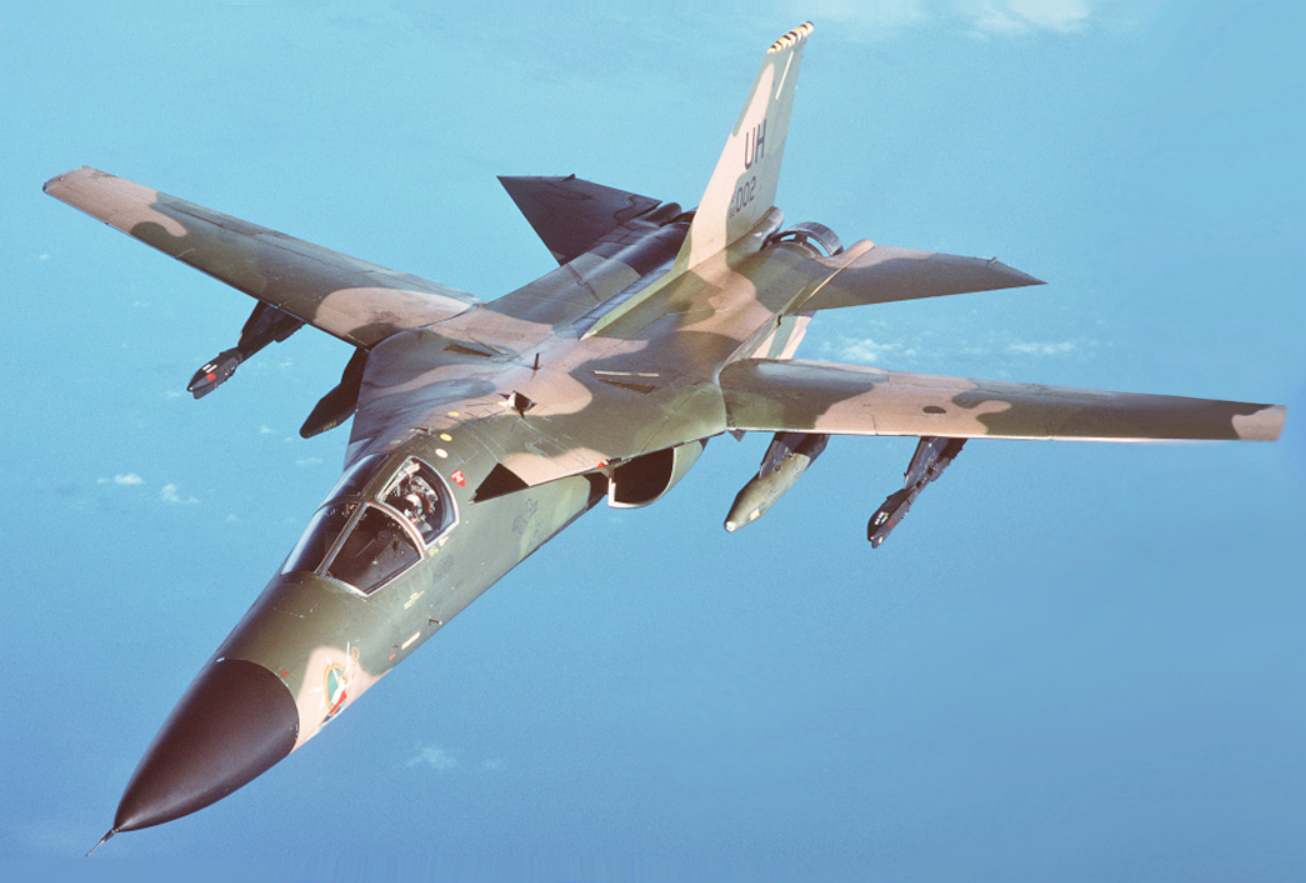
- The winning aircraft, the F-111 Aardvark

General information
- Issued by: United States Air Force
- Proposals: General Dynamics F-111 Aardvark; Boeing 818

History
- Outcome: General Dynamics F-111 selected for production

The United States Air Force and Navy were both seeking new aircraft when Robert McNamara was appointed U.S. Secretary of Defense in January 1961. The aircraft sought by the two armed services shared the need to carry heavy armament and fuel loads, feature high supersonic speed, twin engines and two seats, and probably use variable geometry wings. On 14 February 1961, McNamara formally directed the services to study the development of a single aircraft that would satisfy both requirements. Early studies indicated that the best option was to base the design on the Air Force requirement, and use a modified version for the Navy. In June 1961, Secretary McNamara ordered the go ahead of Tactical Fighter Experimental (TFX) despite Air Force and Navy efforts to keep their programs separate.

Proposals were received from Boeing, General Dynamics, Lockheed, McDonnell, North American and Republic (Republic AP-100). The evaluation group found all the proposals lacking, but Boeing and General Dynamics were selected to submit enhanced designs. The Boeing 818 was recommended by the selection board in January 1962, with the exception of the engine, which was not considered acceptable. Switching to a crew escape capsule instead of ejection seats and alterations to radar and missile storage were also needed. Both companies provided updated proposals in April 1962. Air Force reviewers favored Boeing's offering, while the Navy found both submissions unacceptable for its operations. Two more rounds of updates to the proposals were conducted, with Boeing being picked by the selection board.

In November 1962, McNamara selected General Dynamics' proposal due to its greater commonality between Air Force (F-111A) and Navy (F-111B) versions. The Boeing aircraft shared less than half of the major structural components. General Dynamics signed the TFX contract in December 1962. A Congressional investigation followed, but could not change the selection. The winning proposal later became the General Dynamics F-111 Aardvark.
