= Seversky P-35 =

1935 fighter aircraft series by Seversky

P-35
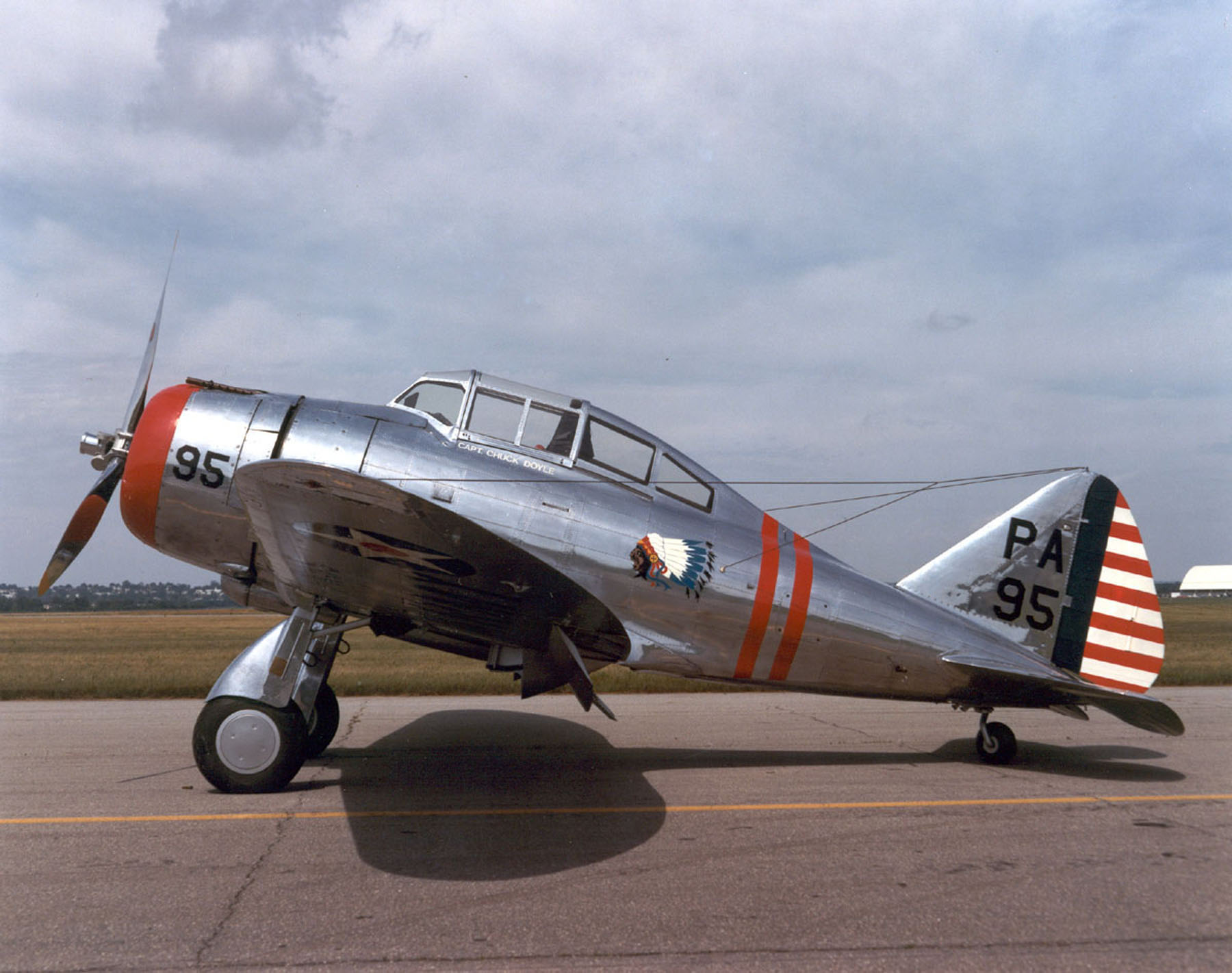
- P-35 (36-404) marked as P-35A in the USAAC at the National Museum of the USAF

General information
- Type: Fighter
- National origin: United States
- Manufacturer: Seversky
- Primary users: United States Army Air Corps: Philippine Army Air Corps; Swedish Air Force
- Number built: 196

History
- Introduction date: 1937
- First flight: 15 August 1935
- Retired: September 1952 (Swedish Air Force)
- Developed from: Seversky SEV-3
- Variant: Seversky A8V
- Developed into: Republic P-43 Lancer

The Seversky P-35 is an American fighter aircraft that was built by the Seversky Aircraft Company in the late 1930s. A contemporary of the Hawker Hurricane and Messerschmitt Bf 109, the P-35 was the first single-seat fighter in United States Army Air Corps service to feature all-metal construction, retractable landing gear, and an enclosed cockpit.

== Design and development ==
The origins of the P-35 can be traced back to the Seversky SEV-3 three-seat amphibian, which was designed by Alexander Kartveli, Seversky's chief designer and Seversky's first aircraft. The SEV-3 first flew in June 1933 and was developed into the Seversky BT-8 basic trainer, 30 of which were ordered by the United States Army Air Corps (USAAC) in 1935. This proved grossly underpowered and was quickly replaced by the North American BT-9.

The second prototype SEV-3 was completed as a two-seat fighter derivative, the SEV-2XP. It was powered by a 735 hp (548 kW) Wright R-1820 radial engine, had fixed landing gear in aerodynamic spats and was armed with one .50 in (12.7 mm) and one .30 in (7.62 mm) forward-firing machine guns plus an additional .30 in (7.62 mm) gun for rear defense.

When the USAAC announced a competition for a new single-seat fighter in 1935, Seversky sent the SEV-2XP, confident it would win despite being a two-seater. However, the aircraft was damaged on 18 June 1935 during its transit to the fly-offs at Wright Field. To compete with the Curtiss Model 75, a single-seat aircraft with retractable undercarriage, Seversky rebuilt the aircraft into the single seat SEV-1XP, replacing the SEV-2XP's fixed landing gear with a retractable undercarriage where the mainwheels retracted backwards into the wing, and an 850 hp (634 kW) R-1820-G5 replacing the -F3 of the SEV-2XP. The SEV-1XP was delivered to Wright Field on 15 August for evaluation, which was generally successful, although the Cyclone failed to deliver its rated power and the SEV-1XP only reached 289 mph (465 km/h) rather than the 300 mph (483 km/h) predicted by Seversky.

Protests from Curtiss led to the formal flyoff between the fighters to be delayed until April 1936. The delay was used by both Seversky and Curtiss to improve their aircraft, while allowing additional fighters from Vought (the Vought V-141) and Consolidated with a single seat version of the PB-2. The SEV-1XP was re-engined again, with a two-row Pratt & Whitney R-1830-9 "Twin Wasp" replacing the Cyclone and a modified vertical stabilizer fitted, becoming the SEV-7.

The P&W also failed to deliver its rated power as it put out only 738 hp (550 kW), and top speed was again well below 300 mph. While more expensive than the Curtiss and Vought designs, the Seversky was a clear winner of the Air Corps' competition, with an order for 77 P-35 fighters and spare parts equivalent to eight airplanes being placed on 16 June 1936 at a cost of $1,636,250. Modifications from SEV-1XP to production P-35 standard included partial instead of complete mainwheel fairings and seven degrees of dihedral to the outer wing panels.

The first production P-35 was delivered to the USAAC in May 1937, preceded by a company owned pre-production aircraft and demonstrator, the AP-1. Only 76 P-35s were built, delivery being completed in August 1938, with the 77th aircraft finished as the prototype XP-41. When it wanted further fighters in 1937, the Air Corps, who were unhappy with both the slow delivery of the P-35, and sale of 2PA two-seat aircraft to the Japanese Navy, ordered 210 Curtiss P-36s.

Also in 1937, a P-35 with naval equipment was supplied to the United States Navy for a design competition to replace the Navy's biplane fighters with an all-metal monoplane. Contrary to usual Navy practice, the single test aircraft was assigned neither a formal Navy serial number nor a type designation; it was instead operated under civil aircraft registration as NX1254 and called the NF-1, a company designation standing for "Naval Fighter One". The prototype competed against the Brewster F2A and Grumman F4F, but was found unsatisfactory, with the F2A being ordered into production. (Note: The original Grumman XF4F-1 was a biplane like preceding Grumman fighters, and it lost the competition because its projected performance was inferior to the monoplanes. Grumman redesigned the F4F as a monoplane and the Navy ordered it as a contingency; the monoplane F4F proved superior to the F2A in service and eclipsed it.) According to some sources, the type designation of FN was assigned to the Seversky under the 1922 United States Navy aircraft designation system, (Note: Swanborough and Bowers note that the US Navy type designation of FN was conflicting, having been assigned to a Naval Aircraft Factory (NAF) fighter project that was canceled before a prototype was built; the manufacturer's identification letter of "N" was nominally assigned to NAF aircraft. Although most of the identification letters were assigned to multiple manufacturers, the authors list no letter as having been assigned to Seversky.) but others claim this is in error.

Seversky continued to develop the design with the hope of selling more aircraft both to the Air Corps and to civil and export customers. It modified the prototype SEV-1XP as a single seat racer, the S-1 entering it into the 1937 Bendix Trophy, where it finished in fourth place. The competition was won by the S-2 (registration number NR70Y), a similar aircraft built for Frank Fuller of the Fuller Paint Company. S-2 also won the Bendix Trophy in 1939 and placed second in 1938. The aircraft was used to portray the "Drake Bullet" in the 1938 film Test Pilot.

Another civil aircraft was the DS, (or Doolittle Special), a single seater for James Doolittle, employed at the time by the Shell Oil Company, while the AP-7 was another racer, powered by a 1,200 hp (895 kW) R-1830 engine and used by Jacqueline Cochran to win the 1938 Bendix Trophy race and to set a women's air speed record. Seversky entered two aircraft based on the P-35 in a 1938 competition for a new fighter for the Air Corps. One was the XP-41 (which had the company designation AP-4D, which was a P-35 with a 1,200 hp (895 kW) R-1830-9 engine fitted with a two-stage supercharger) and the AP-4, which had a turbo-supercharger mounted in the belly of a deeper fuselage. The Air Corps preferred the AP-4D, which was ordered into production as the P-43 Lancer.

Aiming to increase sales, Alexander P. de Seversky personally took a demonstrator on a tour of Europe in early 1939. As a result of this demonstration, Sweden ordered 15 EP-106 fighters on 29 June 1939, a development of the P-35 powered by a 1,050 hp (783 kW) R-1830-45, which improved performance by over 25 mph (40 km/h) and armed with two 7.9 mm (.311 in) machine guns in the cowl and two 13.2 mm (.52 in) machine guns in the wings. A second order for 45 EP-106s was placed on 11 October 1939, with a third order for 60 aircraft, placed on 6 January 1940, although by this time Seversky had been thrown out of the company bearing his name by the board of directors, with the company renaming itself Republic Aviation. The Swedish Air Force designated them J 9.

=== Two-seat versions ===
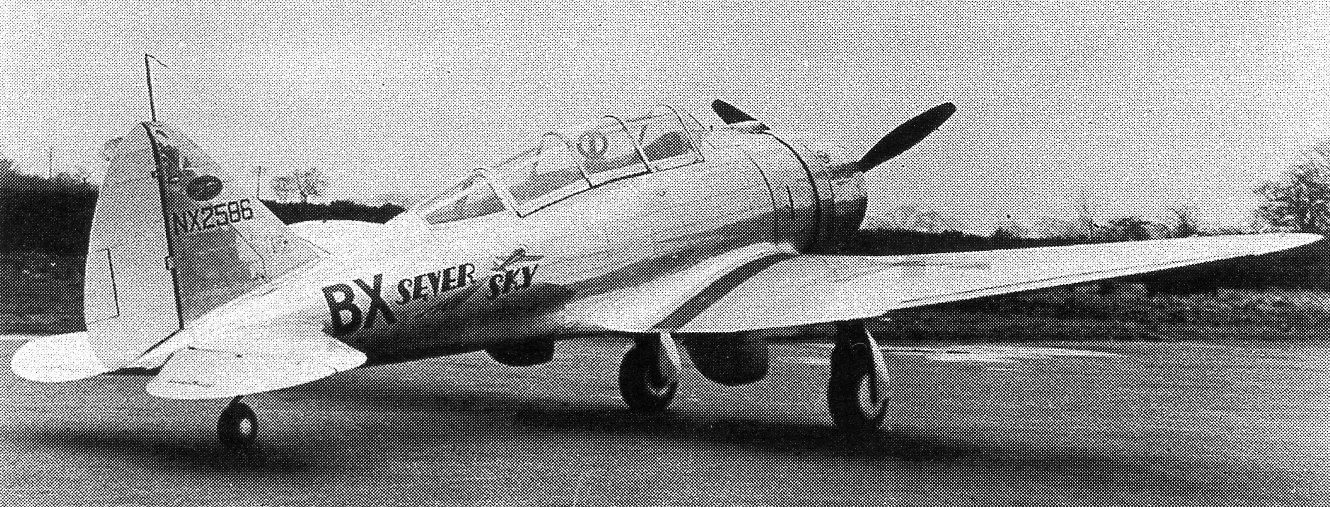
Seversky 2PA/200 under test at RAF Martlesham Heath in 1939

Seversky also built a two-seater, the 2PA. Developed in parallel with the P-35, the 2PA was a two-seat fighter and fighter-bomber with a similar airframe. It offered the choice of either a similar undercarriage to that of the single-seater as the 2PA-L (Land) or an amphibious float undercarriage as the 2PA-A (Amphibian). Dubbed "Convoy Fighter" by the manufacturer, the 2PA was powered by a Wright R-1820-G2 or G3 Cyclone nine-cylinder radial engine, the former rated at 1,000 hp for take-off and the latter at 875 hp. Armament comprised two wing-mounted 7.62 mm or 12.7 mm Browning guns, one 7.62 mm Browning on a flexible mount in the rear cockpit, and two forward-firing fuselage-mounted 7.62 mm or 12.7 mm Browning guns. Provision was made for a bomb load of up to 227 kg (500 lb) on internal wing racks. One 2PA-A and one 2PA-L were procured by the Soviet Union in March 1938, one with conventional landing gear and one with floats, along with the manufacturing license, but it appears that the Soviets never put it into production. In what proved to be an unpopular move for Seversky, 20 2PA-B3s were sold to the Japanese Navy, which briefly employed them in the Second Sino-Japanese War as Navy Type S Two-Seat Fighter or A8V-1 (Allied codename "Dick"). The Japanese were unimpressed with the aircraft and eventually relegated two of them to the Asahi Shimbun newspaper as "hacks." Sweden ordered 52 2PAs (Swedish designation B 6), able to carry 1,350 lb (612 kg) of bombs, but received only two before the US embargo that was imposed on combatants. The remaining 50 were appropriated by the USAAC, re-armed with 0.30 in and 0.50 in machine guns, and used as advanced trainers named AT-12 Guardsman.

== Operational history ==
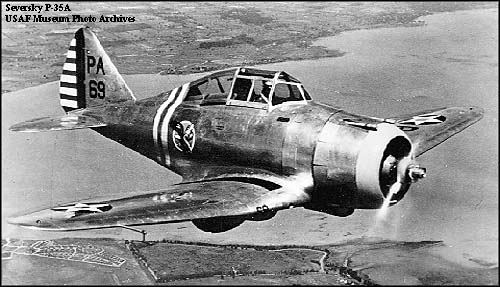
P-35 of 27th Pursuit Squadron, 1st PG, in flight.

=== United States Army Air Corps ===
The first P-35s were delivered to the 1st Pursuit Group (27th, 71st and 94th PS) stationed at Selfridge Field in Michigan. The aircraft used a wet wing to save weight and ground personnel quickly learned about the persistent fuel leaks. The P-35's performance was poor even by contemporary standards and, although USAAC aviators appreciated the aircraft's ruggedness, it was already obsolete by the time deliveries were finished in 1938.

On 18 June 1940, United States declared an embargo against exporting weapons to any nation other than the United Kingdom. Optimistically, Republic continued to manufacture EP-106s which, by the 24 October 1940 order, 60 were taken over by the USAAC as the P-35A. The aircraft were re-armed to American standards with a pair of 0.50 in machine guns that fired through the propeller, but retained the Swedish specification of a 0.30 in machine gun mounted in each wing. Flight instruments were metric, and both their labeling and flight manuals written in Swedish. Of these, three aircraft were kept in United States as instructional airframes for mechanics. Six P-35As were delivered to Ecuador to form the first combat unit, the Escuadrilla de Caza.

=== Philippine Army Air Corps ===
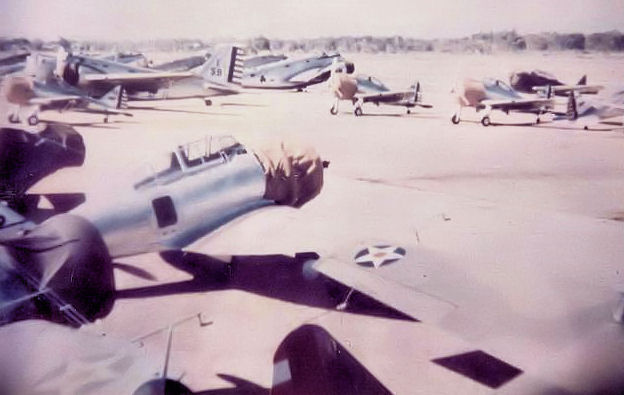
USAAF P-35 fighters and B-18 bombers at Del Carmen Field, Philippines, October 1941

The remainder were sent to the Far East Air Force in the Philippines beginning in February 1941. Eventually all pilots of the three pursuit squadrons on Luzon transitioned to the P-35A from the P-26. About 10 of these were lost in accidents. The P-35s were used primarily as gunnery trainers by all three squadrons because of a critical shortage of .50-caliber ammunition in the Far East Air Force, placing a strain on the engines of all the aircraft since no replacement engines were available. In October 1941, the P-35s were earmarked for transfer to the Philippine Army Air Corps after sufficient Curtiss P-40 Warhawks were received by the FEAF.

In November 1941, after the 3rd and 17th PS received new P-40E aircraft, most of their P-35As were passed to two newly arrived squadrons attached to the group, the 21st and 34th PS, with the latter receiving most. The 21st PS received its P-40Es on the eve of war and transferred its few P-35s to the 34th Pursuit Squadron, which then had nearly a full squadron. It then fought with them in the futile defense of the islands in December 1941, initially at Del Carmen Airfield. They were hopelessly outclassed by the Japanese fighters. Lack of armor and self-sealing fuel tanks made the aircraft extremely vulnerable (12 P-35As were destroyed and six damaged by a Japanese strafing attack on Del Carmen Airfield on 10 December) and by 12 December 1941, only eight P-35As were still in flying condition. However, also on 10 December 1941, a P-35A of the 34th Pursuit Squadron piloted by 1st Lt. Samuel H. Marett is credited with having sunk the Japanese minesweeper W-10 during the Japanese invasion of Vigan in northern Luzon. Marett made multiple strafing runs against W-10, until the ship blew up. The explosion was so powerful it tore a wing off of Marett's P-35, causing him to crash into the sea.

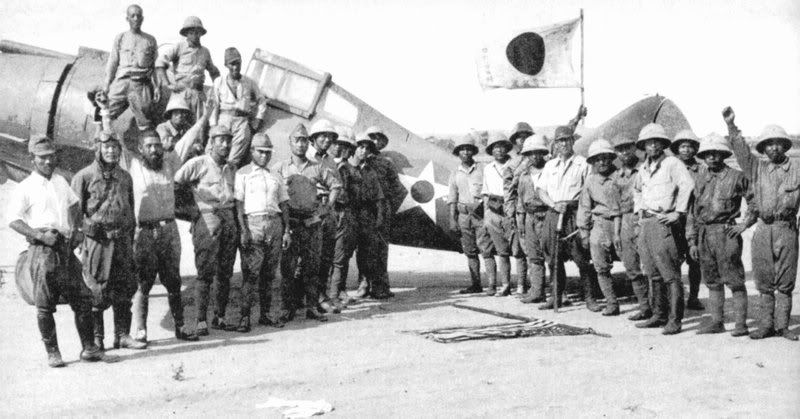
Japanese troops posed with a P-35A of 34th Pursuit Squadron

In late December 1941, most of the remaining strength of the Army Air Force in the Philippines was evacuated to airfields on the Bataan Peninsula. On 2 January 1942, five surviving P-35As attempted to fly from Pilar Field to Bataan Airfield, but two were hit by anti-aircraft fire, with one crashing and the second returning to Pilar where it was wrecked on landing. On 11 January, the two remaining P-35s evacuated to Del Monte Airfield on Mindanao, carrying several unit personnel in their baggage compartments. On 4 April, they returned briefly to Bataan to evacuate other personnel, and one was lost crash-landing on Cebu on 10 April. The sole surviving P-35 was turned over to Capt. Ramon Zosa of the PAAC on 30 April, and flew its last sortie out of Del Monte Airfield, accompanying a P-40 on a strafing attack of Japanese landings at Macajalar Bay on 3 May 1942.

=== Sweden ===
The Swedish Air Force received 60 J 9s in the spring-summer 1940. The aircraft were operated alongside other units assigned to the Svea Air Force Wing (F 8) protecting Stockholm, replacing the obsolete Gloster Gladiators. Swedish J 9s served with Flygvapnet as a fighter until 1946. Later, 10 aircraft were equipped with cameras but retained their J 9 fighter designation and, in addition, a number of others were used for liaison and general flight training. The last seven J 9 aircraft remained in service until September 1952.

== Variants ==
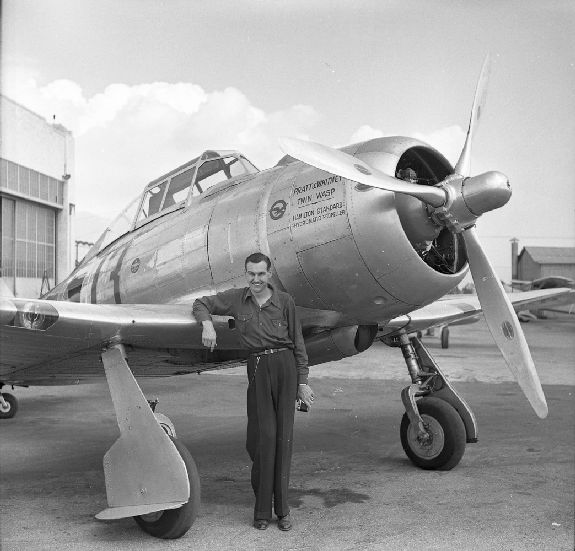
Seversky AP-7A, fitted with Pratt & Whitney R-1830 Twin Wasp engine, 1940.

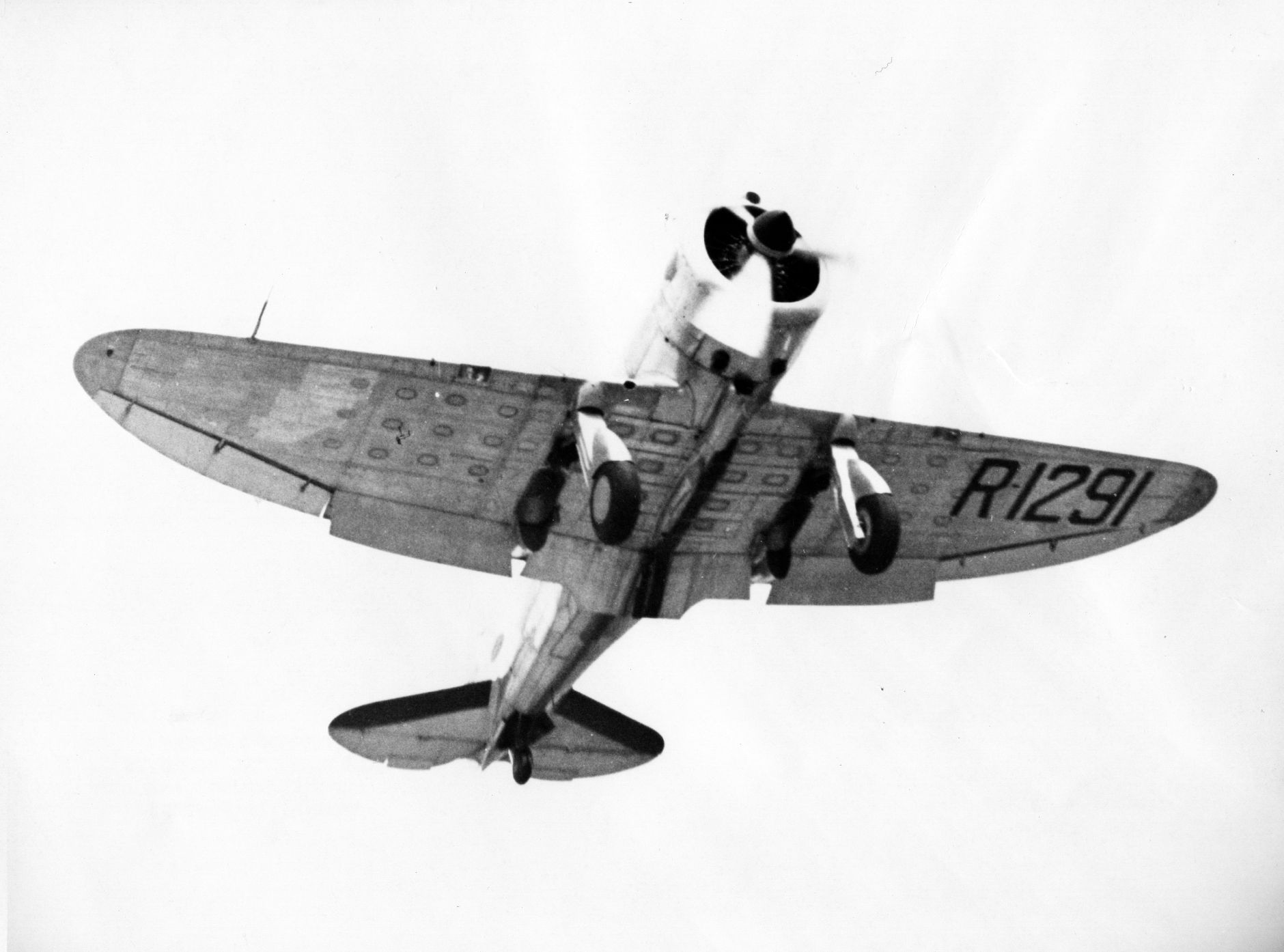
The Seversky SEV-DS, flown by Jimmy Doolittle

AP-1
A P-35 fitted with a Pratt & Whitney R1830 engine.
AP-2
From SEV-1-XP
AP-7
Racer for Jacqueline Cochran
AP-9
Fighter trials aircraft developed in parallel to the AP-7
BT-8
30 production basic trainers for the USAAC
P-35
First production version, Pratt & Whitney R-1830-9 engine with 850 hp (634 kW).

EP-1 – Export version of the P-35.
P-35A – AAF designation for appropriated EP-106 originally contracted to Sweden, Pratt & Whitney R-1830-45 radial piston engine with 1,050 hp (783 kW) and increased armament.
EP-106 – Single-seat fighter version for Sweden.
J 9 – Swedish designation of the EP-1/P-35A.

2PA
Two-seat version with rear gunner.

2PA-202 – European demonstrator
2PA-A – for USSR (Spain)
2PA-B – European demonstrator
2PA-BX – European demonstrator
2PA-B3 – 20 production aircraft for Imperial Japanese Navy Air Service as Seversky A8V1.
2PA-L – to USSR (Spain)
A8V1 "Dick" – Two-seat 2PA used by the Japanese Navy.
B 6 – Swedish designation of the 2PA.
AT-12 Guardsman – Two-seat advanced trainer.

NF-1
Single-seat fighter prototype for US Navy evaluation – company designation standing for "Naval Fighter One". Some sources erroneously refer to this aircraft as FN-1.
SEV-1XP
Single-seat fighter prototype, a.k.a. SEV-S1
SEV-2XP
Two-seat fighter prototype
SEV-DS
for Shell Oil Company / James Doolittle
SEV-X-BT
Two-seat basic trainer
SEV-7
Single-seat fighter prototype, fitted with a Pratt & Whitney R-1830-9 Twin Wasp radial piston engine. The aircraft was later re-designated AP-1.

== Operators ==
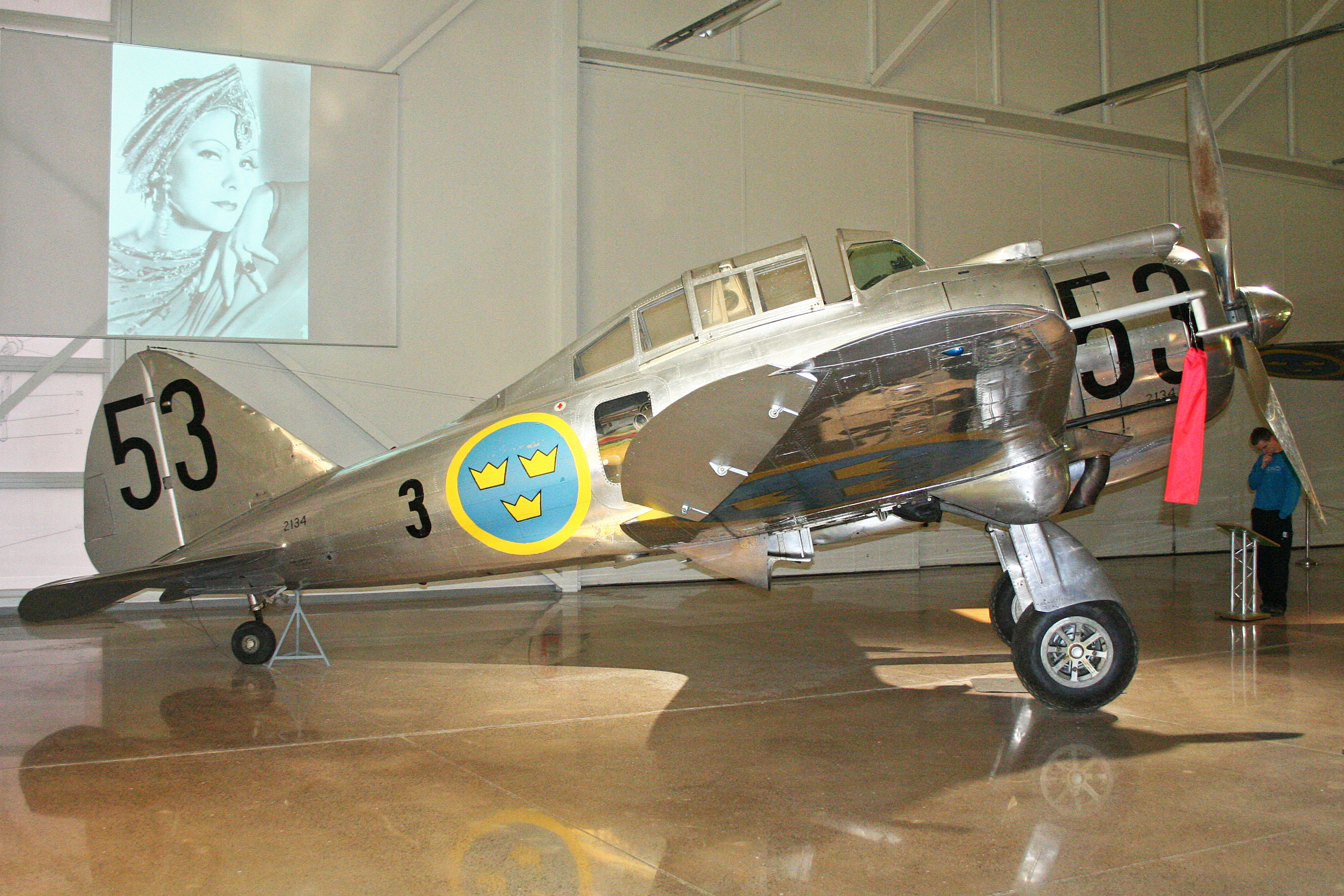
Seversky J 9 of Swedish Air Force

Ecuador

- Ecuadorian Air Force

Philippine Commonwealth

- Philippine Army Air Corps

Sweden

- Swedish Air Force

United States

- United States Army Air Corps

== Surviving aircraft ==
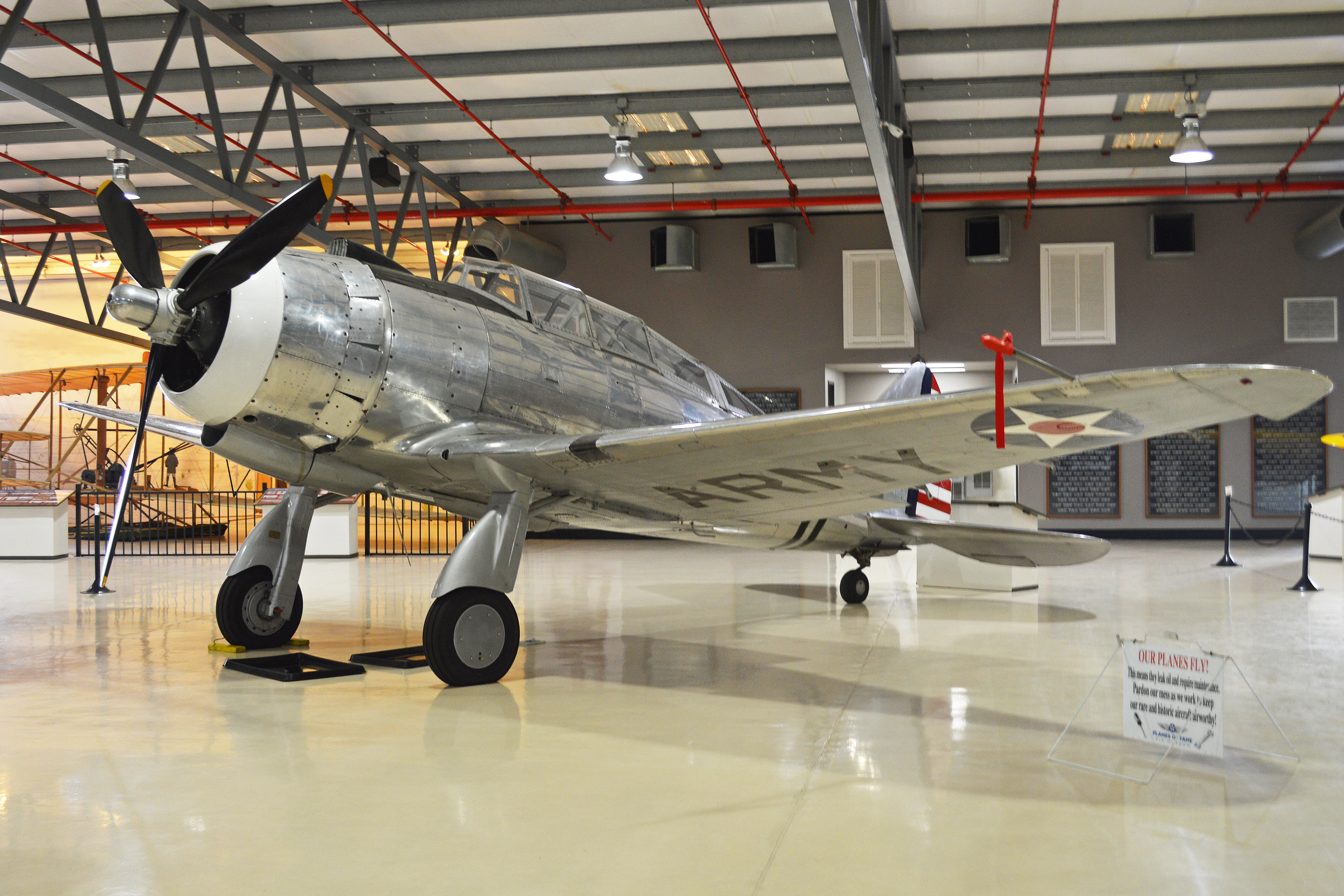
AT-12 Guardsman at the Planes of Fame Air Museum in Chino, 2016

AT-12
USAAF Serial No. 41-17529; (Construction No. 483-38) One of those which did not make it to Sweden, restored to flying condition at the Planes of Fame Air Museum at Chino Airport, California (registered as NX55539).
P-35
USAAC Serial No. 36-404 on display at the National Museum of the United States Air Force as P-35A "17" (4MP).
J 9 (EP-1A)
S/n 282-19 built in 1940, displayed in Swedish Air Force markings 2134/F8-33 on display in Flygvapenmuseum, the Swedish Air Force Museum, in Malmslätt, Sweden.
J 9 (EP-1A)
S/n 282-11 built in 1940 for Swedish Air Force. As of 2012, it was being restored to flying condition at the Fantasy of Flight museum in Polk City, Florida.

== Specifications (P-35A) ==
Data from The American Fighter.

General characteristics

- Crew: One
- Length: 26 ft 10 in (8.18 m)
- Wingspan: 36 ft 0 in (10.97 m)
- Height: 9 ft 9 in (2.97 m)
- Wing area: 220 sq ft (20 m^{2})
- Empty weight: 4,575 lb (2,075 kg)
- Gross weight: 6,118 lb (2,775 kg)
- Max takeoff weight: 6,723 lb (3,050 kg)
- Powerplant: 1 × Pratt & Whitney R-1830-45 Twin Wasp radial engine, 1,050 hp (780 kW)

Performance

- Maximum speed: 290 mph (470 km/h, 252 kn) at 12,000 ft (3,700 m)
- Cruise speed: 260 mph (420 km/h, 230 kn)
- Range: 950 mi (1,530 km, 830 nmi)
- Service ceiling: 31,400 ft (9,600 m)
- Rate of climb: 1,920 ft/min (9.8 m/s)
- Wing loading: 27.8 lb/sq ft (135.8 kg/m^{2})
- Power/mass: 0.172 hp/lb (0.282 kW/kg)

Armament

- Guns: 2 × 0.30 in (7.62 mm) M1919 Browning machine guns; 2 × 0.50 in (12.7 mm) Browning M2/AN machine guns
- Bombs: up to 350 lb (160 kg) of bombs

== See also ==
Related development

- Republic P-43 Lancer
- Republic P-47 Thunderbolt
- Seversky A8V
- Seversky XP-41

Aircraft of comparable role, configuration, and era

- Curtiss P-36 Hawk
- Fokker D.XXI
- Hawker Hurricane
- Koolhoven F.K.58
- MÁVAG Héja
- Polikarpov I-16
- PZL.50 Jastrząb
- Reggiane Re.2000 series
- Vultee P-66 Vanguard
- Weiss Manfréd WM-23 Ezüst Nyíl

== Sources ==
- Angelucci, Enzo and Peter M. Bowers. The American Fighter. Sparkford, Yeovil, UK: Haynes Publishing, 1987. ISBN 0-85429-635-2.
- Cupido, Joe. "Stepping Stone to the 'Jug': A Rare Seversky Survivor – The AT-12 Guardsman". Air Enthusiast No. 84, November/December 1999. pp. 2–3.
- Davis, Larry. P-35: Mini in Action (Mini Number 1). Carrollton, Texas: Squadron/Signal Publications, 1994. ISBN 0-89747-321-3.
- Fitzsimmons, Bernard. The Illustrated International Aircraft Guide Fighters of WWII, Part IX. London: MacDonald Phoebus Ltd., 1981.
- Green, William. War Planes of the Second World War, Volume Four: Fighters. London: Macdonald & Co. (Publishers) Ltd., 1961 (Sixth impression 1969). ISBN 0-356-01448-7.
- Green, William and Gordon Swanborough. "The End of the Beginning...The Seversky P-35". Air Enthusiast, No. 10, July–September 1979, pp. 8–21. ISSN 0143-5450
- Hucker, Robert. "Seversky: Innovator and Prophet." Air Classics, 20th Anniversary Special Edition 1964–1984, 1984.
- Shores, Christopher, Brian Cull and Yasuho Izawa. Bloody Shambles: Volume One: The Drift to War to the Fall of Singapore. London: Grub Street, 1992. ISBN 0-948817-50-X.
- Shores, Christopher, Brian Cull and Yasuho Izawa. Bloody Shambles: Volume Two: The Defence of Sumatra to the Fall of Burma. London: Grub Street, 1993. ISBN 0-948817-67-4.
- United States Air Force Museum Guidebook. Wright-Patterson AFB, Ohio: Air Force Museum Foundation, 1975.
- Swanborough, Gordon; Bowers, Peter M. (1976), United States Navy Aircraft since 1911 (2nd ed.), Annapolis, Maryland: Naval Institute Press, ISBN 0-87021-968-5.
