= Republic P-43 Lancer =

United States fighter aircraft of WWII

P-43 Lancer
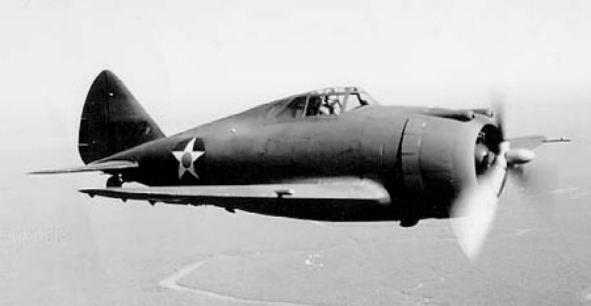
- A USAAF P-43 in 1942

General information
- Type: Fighter
- National origin: United States
- Manufacturer: Republic Aviation
- Status: Retired
- Primary users: United States Army Air Corps: United States Army Air Forces; Republic of China Air Force; Royal Australian Air Force
- Number built: 272

History
- Manufactured: 1940–1941
- Introduction date: 1941
- First flight: March 1940
- Retired: 1944 (China)
- Developed from: Seversky P-35

The Republic P-43 Lancer was a single-engine, all-metal, low-wing monoplane fighter aircraft built by Republic, which was first delivered to the United States Army Air Corps in 1940. A proposed development was the P-44 Rocket. While not a particularly outstanding fighter, the P-43A had a very good high-altitude performance coupled with an effective oxygen system. Fast and well-armed with excellent long-range capabilities, until the arrival of the Lockheed P-38 Lightning, the Lancer was the only American fighter capable of catching a Japanese Mitsubishi Ki-46 "Dinah" reconnaissance plane at the speeds and heights at which they flew. In addition, the P-43 flew many long-range, high-altitude photo recon missions until replaced by F-4/F-5 Lightnings (P-38 variants) in both the USAAF and RAAF.

== Design and development ==
The Seversky Aircraft Company, which in 1939 changed its name to Republic, constructed a range of private venture, one-off variants of its P-35 design, featuring different powerplants and enhancements, designated AP-2, AP-7, AP-4 (which flew after the AP-7), AP-9, and XP-41. The series included a carrier-based version designated the NF-1 (Naval Fighter 1) that was also built. The most significant of these was the AP-4, which served as the basis for future Seversky/Republic aircraft. It featured fully retractable landing gear, flush riveting, and most significantly a Pratt & Whitney R-1830-SC2G engine with a belly-mounted turbo-supercharger, producing 1,200 hp (890 kW) and good high-altitude performance. The turbo-supercharger had been refined by Boeing as part of the development program for the B-17 Flying Fortress, and the improved performance it offered was of great interest to other aircraft manufacturers.

The XP-41 and sole AP-4 were nearly identical, although the AP-4 was initially fitted with a large prop spinner and a tight-fitting engine cowling, as a testbed to evaluate means of improving the aerodynamics of radial-engined fighters, following similar experiments with the first production P-35. The AP-4's big spinner was later removed and a new tight cowling fitted. Unsurprisingly, these measures led to overheating problems. On 22 March 1939, the engine caught fire in flight, the pilot had to bail out, and the AP-4 was lost. Despite the loss of the prototype, the USAAC liked the turbo-supercharged AP-4 demonstrator enough to order 13 more in May 1939, designating them YP-43.

=== YP-43 prototype ===
The YP-43 differed from AP-4 in having a "razorback" fuselage with a tall spine extending back from the canopy. The engine air intake was moved from the port wing to under the engine resulting in the distinctive ovoid cowling. The aircraft was powered by an R-1830-35 14-cylinder air-cooled radial engine with a General Electric B-2 turbo-supercharger generating 1,200 hp and driving a three-blade variable-pitch propeller. Armament consisted of two synchronized .50 in (12.7 mm) machine guns in the cowl and a single .30 in (7.62 mm) machine gun in each wing.

The first of 13 YP-43s was delivered in September 1940, the last in April 1941. Early testing revealed a strong tendency to yaw during takeoff and landing rolls, fixed by redesigning the tailwheel. Although the aircraft exceeded the initial USAAC performance requirements, by 1941 it was clearly obsolete, lacking maneuverability, armor, or self-sealing fuel tanks. The USAAC felt the basic P-35/P-43 design had exhausted its reserves for further improvement in performance and shifted its interest to the promising Republic P-47 Thunderbolt.

=== Production ===
Production aircraft, identical to the YP-43 prototypes, were designated "Lancer" and were delivered between 16 May and 28 August 1941. Ongoing delays in the P-47 program resulted in USAAC ordering an additional 80 P-43A, with Pratt & Whitney R-2180-1 Twin Hornet engine rated at 1,400 hp (1,000 kW). The engine promised better high-altitude performance, and armament was upgraded with 0.50 in machine guns replacing the 0.30 in in the wings. The USAAC was sufficiently interested to assign the AP-4J variant an official designation P-44 Rocket. Combat reports from Europe indicated that the new type was already obsolete, consequently, the entire order was canceled on 13 September 1940, with no prototypes built.

Alexander Kartveli and his team focused their efforts on the advanced AP-10/XP-47 which eventually became the P-47 Thunderbolt. When the Pratt & Whitney R-2800 engine intended for the new P-47 was not yet available, it was decided to order 54 P-43s to keep the Republic production lines operating. An additional 125 P-43A-1s were ordered for China through the Lend-Lease program, originally intended to equip the Third American Volunteer Group (AVG). These initially differed in the Air Materiel Command specification from earlier P-43s in being armed with two 0.50 in machine guns in each wing and no fuselage guns, and having rudimentary armor and fuel tank protection. This would have required a series of serious engineering changes. Reality intervened: actually, as delivered, the P-43A-1 had the same armament layout as the P-43As: four .50 in machine guns, two in the cowl and two in the wings. Externally, they were identical, and only the serial numbers distinguishes a P-43A from a P-43A-1. Many of these aircraft were fitted with cockpit armor before shipment westward from California in crates; evidence is murky whether this additional armor came from Republic or was cobbled together after delivery.

By 1942, a total of 272 P-43s were built, including all its variants, a remarkable number considering the original intention was to build none.

== Operational history ==
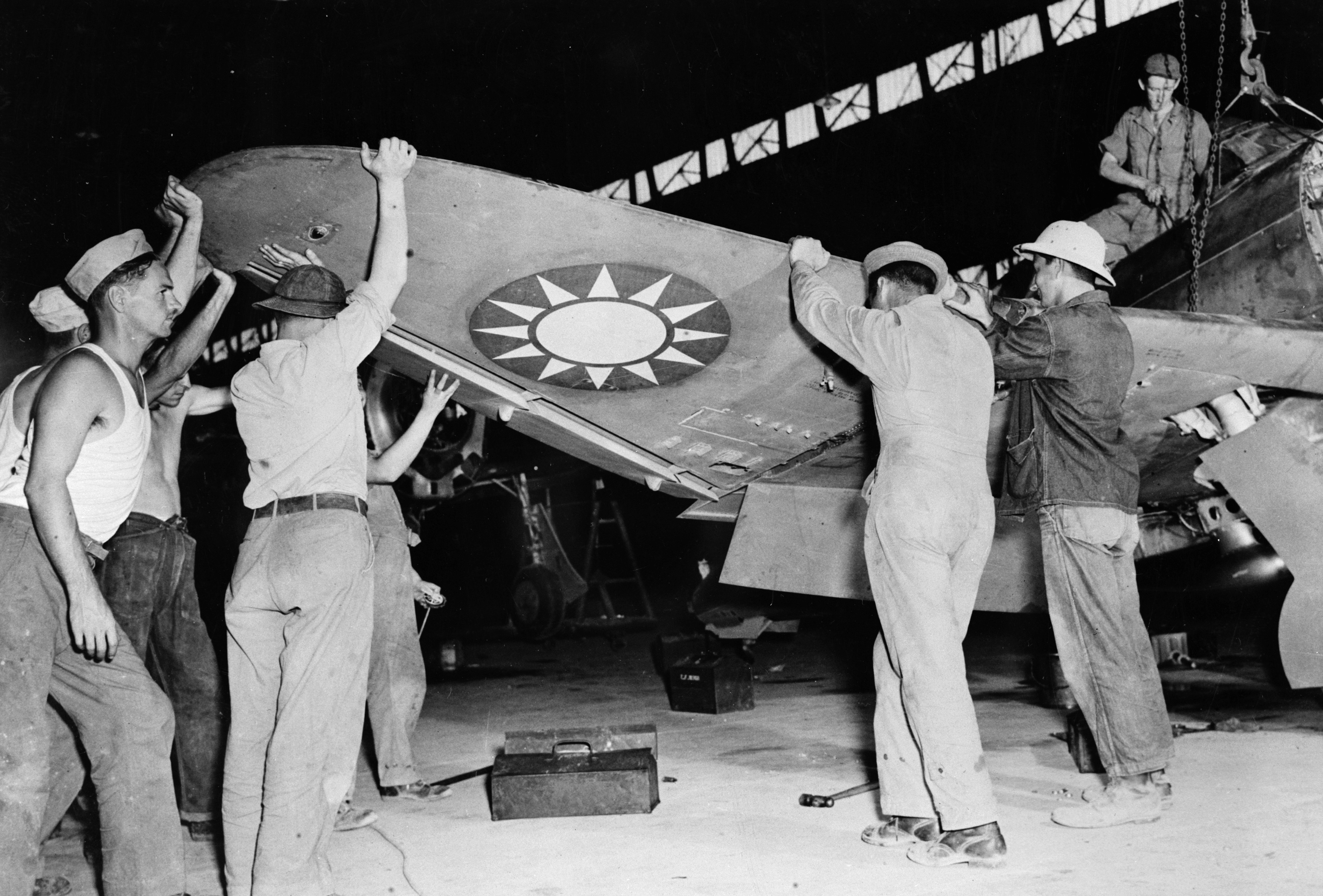
Maintenance on a P-43A in China, circa 1943.

The Lend-Lease aircraft were delivered to China through Claire Chennault's American Volunteer Group, the Flying Tigers. Pilots involved in the ferrying flights commended the P-43 for its good high-altitude performance compared to the Curtiss P-40, good roll rate, and a radial engine without a vulnerable liquid cooling system. Apparently, several AVG pilots asked Chennault to keep some P-43s, but the request was denied due to the aircraft's lack of armor or self-sealing fuel tanks. In addition, the turbo-supercharger proved unreliable and the "wet wing" fuel tanks leaked constantly. In April 1942, Robert Lee Scott Jr. — a USAAF pilot with the AVG —photographed the peaks of Mt. Everest from 44,000 ft (13,000 m), attesting to the strengths of this aircraft. On the other hand, in April 1942, veteran CAF fighter pilot Maj. Zheng Shaoyu, a survivor of many air battles including the "Zero-scourge" in the war against the Imperial Japanese invasion of China, was ferrying a P-43 back into China for renewed combat operations against the Japanese, when it suddenly caught fire causing his death in the ensuing crash.

The Japanese noted that the P-43's fuel tanks were easily punctured, making them easier to shoot down than P-40s. The type was replaced by other aircraft in early 1944. Rudimentary protection added on the P-43A-1 was insufficient. In addition, the R-1830 engines were in high demand for the Douglas C-47 transport, effectively grounding the surviving aircraft.

The USAAC considered the P-43 and its variants obsolete from the start and used them only for training purposes. In fall 1942, all surviving USAAF (transitioned from USAAC in June 1941) P-43s were redesignated RP-43, indicating a permanent change in role. Most of the aircraft that were not sent to China were modified for photo-reconnaissance duties and used for training. Eight P-43s (four P-43A-1s and four P-43Ds) were loaned to the Royal Australian Air Force in 1942 and served with No. 1 Photo Reconnaissance Unit. The RAAF flew many long range, high-altitude photo reconnaissance missions before the six survivors were returned to the USAAF in 1943.

== Variants ==
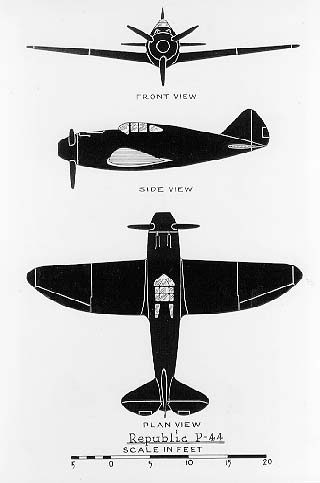
Sketches of the proposed P-44.

YP-43
Pre-production prototypes; 13 built.
P-43
First production version, identical to YP-43; 54 built.
P-43A
Version powered by R-1830-49 engine and armed with 0.50 in (12.7 mm) machine guns in the wings replacing the P-43's original 0.30 in (7.62 mm); 80 built.
P-43A-1
Version for China, rudimentary armor and wing fuel tank protection, armed with four 0.50 in machine guns, centerline hardpoint for a drop tank or up to 200 lb (91 kg) of bombs; 125 built.
P-43B-RE
Conversion of P-43A to photo-reconnaissance version with cameras in rear fuselage. Fourteen aircraft converted.
P-43C
Conversion of P-43A to photo-reconnaissance version with different photographic equipment than P-43B. Two converted.
P-43D
Conversion of P-43A to photo-reconnaissance version with revised equipment. Six converted.
P-43E
Proposed photo-reconnaissance version. Unbuilt.
RP-43
Re-designation of USAAF P-43s as "restricted from combat" in October 1942.
RP-43A
Re-designation of USAAF P-43As as "restricted from combat" in October 1942.
P-44 Rocket (AP-4J)
Proposed version with 1,400 hp (1,000 kW) Pratt & Whitney R-2180-1 engine; none built.

== Operators ==
Australia

- Royal Australian Air Force

Republic of China

- Republic of China Air Force

United States

- United States Army Air Forces

== Specifications (P-43A) ==
Data from The American Fighter

General characteristics

- Crew: 1
- Length: 28 ft 6 in (8.69 m)
- Wingspan: 36 ft 0 in (10.97 m)
- Height: 14 ft 0 in (4.27 m)
- Wing area: 223 sq ft (20.7 m^{2})
- Empty weight: 5,996 lb (2,720 kg)
- Gross weight: 7,435 lb (3,372 kg)
- Max takeoff weight: 8,480 lb (3,846 kg)
- Powerplant: 1 × Pratt & Whitney R-1830-49 14-cylinder air-cooled radial piston engine, 1,200 hp (890 kW)

Performance

- Maximum speed: 356 mph (573 km/h, 309 kn) at 20,000 ft (6,100 m)
- Cruise speed: 280 mph (450 km/h, 240 kn)
- Range: 650 mi (1,050 km, 560 nmi)
- Service ceiling: 36,000 ft (11,000 m)
- Time to altitude: 6 minutes to 15,000 ft (4,600 m)

Armament

- Guns: 4 × 0.50 in (12.7 mm) M2 Browning machine guns

== See also ==
Related development

- Seversky SEV-3
- Seversky P-35
- Republic P-47 Thunderbolt

Aircraft of comparable role, configuration, and era

- Grumman F4F Wildcat
- Brewster F2A Buffalo
- CAC Boomerang
- Curtiss P-36 Hawk
- North American P-64
- PZL.50 Jastrząb
- Polikarpov I-180
- Vultee P-66 Vanguard
- Weiss Manfréd WM-23 Ezüst Nyíl

Related lists

- List of aircraft of World War II
- List of fighter aircraft
- List of military aircraft of the United States
