= Republic Aviation =

Defunct American aviation company

Republic Aviation Corporation
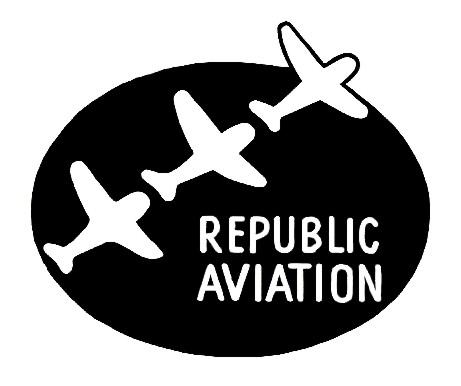
- Formerly: Seversky Aircraft Company
- Industry: Aerospace
- Founded: 1931; 95 years ago, 1939; 87 years ago reorganized as Republic Aviation
- Founder: Alexander de Seversky
- Fate: 1965; 61 years ago Acquired by Fairchild Aircraft
- Headquarters: Farmingdale, Long Island, New York, United States
- Key people: Robert S. Johnson; Alexander Kartveli; Paul Moore; Kenneth Jernstedt
- Parent: Fairchild Aircraft (1965–1987)

The Republic Aviation Corporation was an American aircraft manufacturer based in Farmingdale, New York, on Long Island. Originally known as the Seversky Aircraft Company, the company was responsible for the design and production of many important military aircraft, including its most famous products: World War II's P-47 Thunderbolt fighter, the F-84 Thunderjet and F-105 Thunderchief jet fighters.

== History ==
=== Seversky Aircraft ===
The Seversky Aircraft Company was founded in 1931 by Alexander de Seversky, a Russian expatriate and veteran World War I pilot who had lost a leg in the war. In the beginning, many of Seversky Aircraft's designers were Russian and Georgian engineers, including Michael Gregor and Alexander Kartveli, who would go on to design many of Republic's most famous aircraft.

After several failed attempts, Seversky Aircraft finally won a design competition for a new United States Army Air Corps fighter, and was awarded its first military contract in 1936 for the production of its Seversky P-35.

In 1939, Seversky Aircraft again entered in a military fighter competition, this time with the much-improved AP-4. While the contract was awarded to the Curtiss P-40, the USAAC was impressed with the high-altitude performance of the AP-4 and ordered 13 additional aircraft for testing, as the XP-43.

By April 1939, the Seversky Aircraft Corporation had lost $550,000, and Seversky was forced out of the company he had founded. The board, led by financier Paul Moore, voted W. Wallace Kellett to replace him as president, and in September 1939 the company was reorganized as the Republic Aviation Corporation. Seversky continued to fight for his company, and the matter was not resolved to his satisfaction until September 1942.

Meanwhile, Seversky's AP-4 continued in development, finally going into production as the P-43 Lancer. 272 P-43s were eventually produced, with 108 of them being sent to China to be used against the Japanese. Many passed through the hands of the AVG Flying Tigers, whose pilots were pleased with the plane's performance at altitudes up to 30,000 ft (9,100 m), while their P-40s were ineffective at altitudes over 20,000 ft (6,100 m). Perhaps Claire Chennault disliked the early P-43's lack of self-sealing fuel tanks and armor. He declined to retain the plane for his crews.

In 1939, both Republic and Curtiss participated in an Army competition to develop a lightweight interceptor. Curtiss submitted a lightweight version of the P-40 designated the XP-46 while Republic submitted a similar design designated the XP-47. Both designs were based on a lightweight aircraft built around an Allison V-1710 V-12 engine, with the Republic design using a turbosupercharger. In the end, neither design showed a significant improvement over the P-40, and neither was produced.

A 1943 advertisement for REPUBLIC AVIATION from Flight & Aircraft Engineer magazine

Further development of the P-43 continued in the form of a lightweight version using a Pratt & Whitney R-2180 radial engine. The resulting aircraft was known as the XP-44. When the R-2180 did not produce the expected horsepower, Republic switched to the Wright R-2600. Despite possessing 1,600 horsepower (1,200 kW), this engine could not be turbo-supercharged and Republic finally modified the design again, this time to accommodate the enormous Pratt & Whitney R-2800 Double Wasp engine, which produced 1,850 horsepower (1,380 kW). The resulting aircraft, now known as the P-44, was truly impressive. Capable of speeds of 404 mph (650 km/h) at 20,000 ft (6,100 m), and a climb rate of 4,000 ft (1,200 m) per minute, the aircraft would have been an exceptional interceptor. Unfortunately, it was capable of carrying no more fuel than the P-43, and the Double Wasp engine was far more thirsty, significantly limiting the aircraft's range.

As the air war in Europe progressed, the Army was discovering that what it really needed was a long-range fighter capable of escorting bombers into Germany. Alexander Kartveli was called to the Army's Experimental Aircraft division and told of the new requirements, and that the P-44 would not be ordered in its current configuration. This was a devastating setback for Kartveli and Republic Aircraft because Kartveli knew the XP-44 could not be redesigned to meet these new requirements. On the train back to New York City, he began sketching a new design. This aircraft would become the P-47 Thunderbolt.

=== P-47 Thunderbolt ===
The USAAF refused to give Republic any money for the development of the new XP-47B, so Republic paid for the construction of the first mock-up, reusing the cockpit area of the P-43. By the time the prototype was ready for testing, it weighed over 12,550 lb, 900 lb (410 kg) over the Army's limit for the new fighter design, and far more than any single-engine fighter ever developed. It also could carry only 298 gallons of fuel, 17 gallons less than the requirement, but the Army was generally pleased with its performance, achieving speeds of 412 mph (663 km/h) at 25,800 ft (7,900 m), and overlooked these issues.

The U.S. entry into the war in December 1941 rapidly increased the need for the XP-47B and work on the plane progressed quickly. In June 1942, the Army took delivery of its first P-47Bs. They soon placed an order that required Republic Aviation to quadruple the size of their factory and build three new runways at the Farmingdale, New York factory. Eventually this proved inadequate, and in November 1942, the Army authorized the construction of a new factory adjacent to the Evansville, Indiana airport.

Throughout the war, the P-47 would undergo constant development. A bubble canopy was added to increase rearward visibility. The final version of the P-47 would be the P-47N, a long-range version with longer wings and fuselage, and an increased fuel capacity. The P-47N was designed to escort B-29s on long missions to Japan for a planned invasion of the Japanese homeland that never came. Production of all versions ended in November 1945. By then, 15,660 P-47s had been built, making it the most produced U.S. fighter of the war. Of those, 1,816 would be the long-range P-47N model. This model would continue to serve with Air Force Reserve and Air National Guard units until the mid-1950s. Republic ranked 24th among United States corporations in the value of wartime production contracts.

=== RC-3 Seabee ===
In 1946, Republic temporarily left the field of military contracts to produce the Republic RC-3 Seabee, an unusual all-metal amphibian. The Seabee was the brainchild of Percival "Spence" Spencer, a former Republic P-47 test pilot. He convinced the Republic board of the need for a light sport plane to meet a demand for private aircraft from pilots returning from World War II. The expected sales of 5,000 Seabees a year never materialized, as most returning pilots never flew again, though Republic did manage to sell 1,060 Seabees in two years of production. This was a respectable number at a time when many small aircraft manufacturers were producing only a handful of aircraft before going bankrupt. Much of this was due to the Seabee's remarkably low price of just $3,500 to $6,000.

=== F-84 family ===
In 1946, Republic again turned its attention to military contracts, developing a single-engine jet fighter to meet an Army requirement for a fighter with a top speed of 600 mph (970 km/h). The first YP-84A Thunderjet flew on February 28, 1946, but the aircraft was plagued with so many developmental problems that the first F-84B didn't enter Air Force service until 1949. The straight-wing F-84D would go on to become an important aircraft during the Korean War, flying 86,408 missions. In 1949, a swept-wing version, the F-84F Thunderstreak, was developed but additional development and engine problems resulted in the aircraft not entering service until 1954. A photo-reconnaissance version known as the RF-84F Thunderflash was developed from the F-84F, and 715 were produced. The final straight-wing version, known as the F-84G, was a holdover design for Republic while the J-65 engine for the swept wing F-84F was still being developed. The F-84F would continue in service with Air National Guard units until 1971, when corrosion forced them to be withdrawn from U.S. service. The F-84F and RF-84F were both used by several foreign operators including Germany, The Netherlands, Belgium, France, Italy, Greece, Turkey, and Denmark (one squadron of RF-84F that were phased out in 1971). The F-84F continued to serve in European air forces until the 1980s.

=== F-105 Thunderchief ===
In 1951, Alexander Kartveli began to design a replacement for the F-84 Thunderjet. The new aircraft would be a single-engine fighter, but larger than any single-engine fighter ever designed for the Air Force. By the time the mock-up was completed in October 1953, the aircraft had grown so large that a more powerful engine was needed; the Pratt & Whitney J75 was finally selected. On June 28, 1954, the Air Force placed an order for 15 of the new F-105A Thunderchief. The aircraft weighed 50,000 lb (23,000 kg), but could carry up to 14,000 lb (6,400 kg) of bombs and missiles, and could fly at Mach 1 at sea level and Mach 2 at altitude. Although it had only one engine, the F-105 could carry a larger bomb load than a four-engine World War II bomber, and travel a greater distance at much higher speed. The F-105 would become the primary ground attack aircraft of the Vietnam War, flying over 20,000 missions until replaced by the McDonnell Douglas F-4 Phantom II in November 1970. Of the 833 F-105s produced, 397 were lost during the Vietnam War. Seventeen were shot down by North Vietnamese MiGs, while most of the rest were lost to ground fire. The F-105 was Republic Aviation's last independent design.

A two-seat version, the F-105G, known as "Wild Weasel", was later developed to replace the "Wild Weasel" version of the F-100. The first F-105G flew on January 15, 1966, and deliveries began arriving in Southeast Asia in June 1966. This version continued operating in theater long after the ground attack versions had been withdrawn and was still in service at the end of the war.

=== The final years ===
In December 1957, Republic developed a helicopter division, building the French Aérospatiale Alouette II helicopter under license, with marginal sales success.

In an effort to keep the company going, Republic proposed converting a wartime-developed four-engine reconnaissance aircraft (the XF-12 Rainbow) into a transport aircraft. The aircraft would be very fast for a prop plane, but interest from airlines was not sufficient to continue development of the aircraft and the project was cancelled.

Republic Aviation made one last attempt to survive by returning to military contracts. In 1960, Republic Aviation acquired a minority interest in the Dutch aircraft company Fokker, and attempted to market a Fokker-designed attack plane (Fokker/Republic D-24 Alliance variable sweep wing VTOL) to the Air Force, but the Air Force showed little interest in the foreign design and no contracts were offered.

In the early 1960s, the aerospace company Fairchild, owned by Sherman Fairchild, began purchasing Republic's stock and finally acquired Republic Aviation in July 1965. In September, Republic became the Republic Aviation Division of Fairchild Hiller and ceased to exist as an independent company.

Republic's naming system was carried forward by Fairchild Hiller with the A-10 Thunderbolt II, which first flew in May 1972.

=== Legacy ===
In addition to the continued front-line use of the A-10, a number of flying and static restorations have served to sustain public awareness of Republic's role in aviation history. The American Airpower Museum, which is based on the former Republic factory site in Farmingdale, New York, maintains a collection of Republic artifacts, historic facilities, and an array of aircraft spanning the history of the company. The museum counts itself among the few worldwide that actually maintain and fly historic aircraft, and it counts an original Republic P-47D fighter among its airworthy fleet. The museum's static displays include a Republic F-84 first generation jet fighter, an F-84F swept-wing fighter, a rare example of the RF-84F reconnaissance variant, and an F-105 Thunderchief. In 2014, the museum added an A-10 Warthog, completing the collection of Republic fighters. The museum's volunteer corps includes both former Republic line workers and Air Force veterans with direct Republic Aviation flight experience.

During the fall of 1987, Fairchild Corporation (then Republic's parent company) destroyed Republic's corporate archives. Joshua Stoff, the curator of the Cradle of Aviation Museum on Long Island, wrote in Air & Space Magazine that, upon being invited to have a last look at the archives, he surreptitiously took one document with him. That lone surviving document was a contract for 225 P-47Bs from Republic for the US Army Air Corps at a cost of $16,275,657.50 (War Department Contract #15850, dated September 13, 1940). It is now housed at the museum.

The Long Island Republic Airport Historical Society, housed in the lobby of the Republic Airport Main Terminal building, maintains several photo exhibits on Republic aviation and Republic aircraft. It also maintains an extensive collection of archival photos, artifacts, corporate documents, and news articles on Republic.

== Aircraft ==
Model name	First flight	Number built	Type
Seversky SEV-3	1933	>36	Single-engine three-seat amphibian
Seversky P-35	1935	Up to 196	Single-engine single-seat propeller fighter aircraft
Seversky A8V	1935	70	Single-engine single-seat propeller fighter aircraft
Seversky XP-41	1939	1	Single-engine single-seat propeller fighter aircraft
Republic P-43 Lancer	1940	272	Single-engine single-seat propeller fighter aircraft
Republic P-44 Rocket	N/A	0	Unbuilt single-engine single-seat propeller fighter aircraft
Republic P-47 Thunderbolt	1941	15,636	Single-engine single-seat propeller fighter
Republic XP-69	N/A	0	Unbuilt single-engine single-seat propeller fighter
Republic XP-72	1944	2	Prototype single-engine single-seat propeller fighter
Republic RC-3 Seabee	1945	1,060	Single-engine four-seat pusher propeller amphibious aircraft
Republic XF-12 Rainbow	1946	2	Four engine long-range reconnaissance/transport aircraft
Republic F-84 Thunderjet	1946	4,285	Single-engine single-seat jet fighter-bomber
Republic XF-91 Thunderceptor	1949	2	Single-seat jet/rocket interceptor
Republic F-84F Thunderstreak	1950	2,711	Single-engine single-seat jet fighter
Republic XF-103	N/A	0	Unbuilt single-seat jet/ramjet interceptor
Republic RF-84F Thunderflash	1952	715	Single-engine single-seat jet reconnaissance aircraft
Republic XF-84H Thunderscreech	1955	2	Prototype single-engine single-seat turboprop fighter
Republic F-105 Thunderchief	1955	833	Single-engine single-seat jet fighter-bomber
Republic AP-100	1957	0	Unbuilt Six-engined VTOL strike fighter
Fairchild Republic A-10 Thunderbolt II	1972	716	Twin-engine single-seat jet ground attack aircraft

- Republic-Ford JB-2 (1944) pulse-jet pilotless guided missile, an American copy of the German V-1 flying bomb
