= Republic XF-12 Rainbow =

Prototype reconnaissance aircraft

XF-12 Rainbow
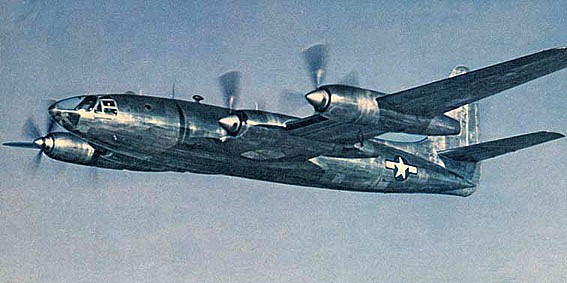

General information
- Type: Strategic aerial reconnaissance
- National origin: United States
- Manufacturer: Republic Aviation
- Status: Canceled
- Primary user: United States Army Air Forces
- Number built: 2

History
- First flight: 4 February 1946
- Retired: June 1952

The Republic XF-12 Rainbow was an American four-engine, all-metal prototype aircraft designed by Republic Aviation in the 1940s for aerial reconnaissance with the United States Army Air Forces (USAAF). Designed to maximize aerodynamic efficiency, the XF-12 was referred to as "flying on all fours" meaning: four radial engines, 400 mph (640 km/h) cruise, 4,000 mi (6,400 km) range, at 40,000 ft (12,000 m). The aircraft was redesignated as the XR-12 when the USAAF became the United States Air Force in 1947.

Although the XF-12 was highly innovative, it was projected to be costly to produce and operate, and rapidly advancing technology—specifically the introduction of the jet engine—threatened to render it obsolete quickly. The prototypes were not completed until after the end of World War II, and postwar budget cuts prompted the cancellation of the production contract in favor of less expensive aircraft based on strategic bombers. Both prototypes were only used briefly for testing and were destroyed, one in a crash and the other as a practice target. A proposed airliner variant, the RC-2, was deemed uneconomical and canceled before being built.

== Development ==
The original proposal from the United States Army Air Corps Air Technical Service Command in late 1943 was for a 400 mph (640 km/h) reconnaissance aircraft with a range of 4,000 nmi (7,400 km; 4,600 mi) and a ceiling of 40,000 ft (12,000 m). Its primary objective was high-speed overflights of the Japanese homeland and key enemy installations. During World War II, due to the range requirements of operating in the Pacific, existing fighters and bombers were being used but were poorly suited to the USAAF's needs. The requirement existed for dedicated photo-reconnaissance aircraft with speed, range, and altitude capabilities beyond what was then available.

In August 1943, US President Franklin D. Roosevelt's son, Colonel Elliott Roosevelt, commander of a Lockheed F-5 (a modified P-38 Lightning) "recon" unit, recommended the acquisition of a dedicated high-performance photo reconnaissance aircraft to provide pre- and post-strike target analysis intelligence as well as photo interpretation to better allow commanders to make decisions for bombing raids. Republic Aviation submitted the XF-12 and it was competing against the Hughes XF-11. Both were powered by the new P&W R-4360. The XF-12's first flight was made on 4 February 1946 and during flight testing, it reached an altitude of 45,000 ft (14,000 m) at 470 mph (760 km/h), and demonstrated a range of 4,500 mi (7,200 km), exceeding design criteria. The XF-12 could photograph in both daylight and night and under conditions of reduced visibility at high altitudes over long ranges and with great speed. This "flying photo lab" was capable of mapping broad stretches of the globe.

Only two prototypes were built each of the XF-11 and the XF-12 were ordered into service by the US Army Air Forces, as the requirement evaporated after World War II ended, while the cheaper off-the-shelf Boeing B-29 Superfortress and Boeing B-50 Superfortress could temporarily fill the role until the jet-powered Boeing RB-47 Stratojet entered service. The XF-12 was the fastest aircraft of its day to use four reciprocating engines, and the only one to exceed 450 mph (720 km/h) in level flight

== Design ==
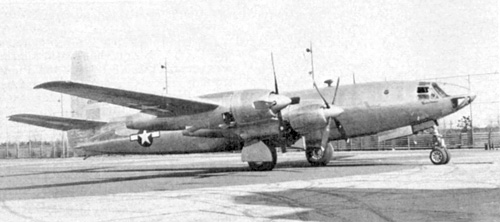
XF-12 Rainbow circa 1946

Minimizing drag was a primary consideration throughout the design of the XF-12. Many features came from Republic's experience with fighter aircraft. Unusually, no compromises to the aerodynamics were made in the shape of its fuselage. Aviation Week was quoted as saying "the sharp nose and cylindrical cigar shape of the XF-12 fulfils a designer's dream of a no compromise design with aerodynamic considerations."

For its reconnaissance role, the XF-12 had three photographic compartments aft of the wing. One vertical, one split vertical, and one trimetrogon each using a 6 in (150 mm) Fairchild K-17 camera. For night reconnaissance, the XF-12 had a belly hold which accommodated 18 high-intensity photo-flash bombs to be ejected over the target. All bays were equipped with electrically operated, inward retracting doors designed for minimum drag and camera lenses were electrically heated to prevent frost build-up. The XF-12 also carried complete darkroom facilities to permit developing and printing the film while still airborne augmented by adjustable storage racks to handle any size of film container and additional photo equipment. This allowed immediate access to the intelligence after landing without the usual processing delay.

Its wing had a straight taper with a high aspect ratio for maximum efficiency and squared tips. The engines used a sliding cowl to facilitate engine cooling instead of cowling flaps, which caused too much drag. There was also a two-stage impeller fan directly behind the propeller hub. These refinements allowed the engines to be tightly cowled for aerodynamic efficiency, while still keeping the engines adequately cooled. When the sliding cowl ring was closed during flight, the cooling air was ducted through the nacelle to the rear exhaust orifice increasing thrust, rather than adding drag as is usually the case.

Air for engine intakes, oil coolers and intercoolers was drawn through the leading edge of each wing between the inboard and outboard engines. This reduced drag compared to using individual intakes for each component. In addition, because the air was taken from a high-pressure area at the front of the wing, this provided a ram air boost for increased power at high speeds, and more effective cooling of the oil and intercoolers. The intakes made up 25% of the total wingspan and were extensively wind tunnel tested. After being used, the air was ducted toward the rear of the nacelle, to provide thrust. The entire engine nacelle was nearly as long as a Republic P-47 Thunderbolt. Research showed that a force roughly equivalent to 250 hp (190 kW) was generated by each engine exhaust during high speed cruise while at altitude. Each engine featured twin General Electric turbochargers at the rear of the nacelle and for brief bursts of additional power, water-methanol injection.

The XF-12 was originally intended to use contra-rotating propellers similar to those used on the XF-11, However, due to delivery delays and reliability issues, they were never installed. They would have been twinned three-bladed propellers (rotating in opposite directions). As it was, the aircraft used standard four-bladed Curtiss Electric propellers. (Note: Republic obtained a waiver from the contra-rotating propeller design requirement, citing developmental problems and disappointing performance tests. Historian Mike Machat notes that some sources erroneously attribute the waiver to the XF-11 maiden flight crash that almost killed Howard Hughes, which was partially caused by a malfunctioning propeller, but this is chronologically impossible because the USAAF granted the waiver in July 1945, about a year before the crash.)

The only visible external difference between the first and second prototypes was the addition of cooling gills on the upper engine cowlings. The second prototype was fitted with the full reconnaissance equipment suite.

== Operational history ==
The first prototype was damaged on 10 July 1947 while undergoing maximum landing weight tests when the right main gear was severed at the engine nacelle. After bouncing hard and staggering back into the air the test pilot climbed to a safe altitude where excess fuel was burnt off, to lighten the aircraft and reduce the risk of fire. The pilot landed on the left main gear and the nose wheel and despite losing as much speed as possible before the other wing dropped, the aircraft suffered significant damage. The wing spar was cracked, and engines and props needed to be replaced but it was repaired by Republic, and returned to service. When the US Army Air Forces became the US Air Force the XF-12 was later re-designated XR-12.

Operation Birds Eye was conceived to demonstrate the XF-12's capabilities. On 1 September 1948, the second prototype departed the US Air Force Flight Test Center at Muroc, California, and climbed west to its 40,000 ft (12,000 m) cruising altitude over the Pacific before heading east. It then photographed its entire flight path across the United States on 390 individual 10 in (250 mm) photos, which were jointed to form a continuous 325 ft (99 m) print.

They landed at Mitchel Field on Long Island, New York after six hours and 55 minutes at an average speed of 361 mph (581 km/h). A photo was taken approximately every 66 seconds. The flight was featured in the 29 November 1948 issue of Life magazine and the filmstrip exhibited at the 1948 US Air Force Association Convention in New York. The XF-12 program had already been canceled when this flight was made.

On 7 November 1948, the second prototype crashed while returning to Eglin Air Force Base from a photographic suitability test flight after the number 2 (port inner) engine exploded, causing violent buffeting. Five of the seven crew escaped safely while two crew members were killed. The first prototype continued flight testing after being returned to service in 1948 but with no orders forthcoming and with the second prototype lost, flight testing was wound down and the remaining prototype was retired in June 1952, having flown just 117 hours from 1949 to 1952. It was later expended as a target at the Aberdeen Proving Ground, Maryland.

== RC-2 ==
Republic proposed an airliner version, the RC-2, which would be lengthened to 98 ft 9 in (30.10 m) with a fuselage plug ahead of the wing, and the Plexiglas nose replaced with a conventional nose. Pratt & Whitney R-4360-59s with only one General Electric turbosupercharger each would replace the R-4360-31s, providing more power at lower altitudes, and fuel capacity would be increased. The airliner would carry a crew of seven, and the lavishly appointed cabin for 46 passengers would feature pressurization to sea level with air conditioning, an electric galley providing hot meals, and an inflight lounge. The RC-2 would cruise above bad weather at 435 mph (700 km/h) at 40,000 feet (12,000 m).

American Airlines and Pan Am made tentative orders, but without military F-12 orders to subsidize development and tooling costs, the RC-2's purchase price was higher than they would accept. The RC-2 also would have had higher operating costs per passenger than more capacious airliners with similar fuel consumption such as the Lockheed Constellation and the Douglas DC-6, and the end of the war created a glut of surplus military transports such as the Douglas C-54 Skymaster which could be readily converted into airliners for a fraction of the cost of new aircraft. Thus, the RC-2 program was canceled before any were built.

== Specifications (XF-12) ==
Data from Jane's all the World's Aircraft 1947

General characteristics

- Crew: 7
- Length: 93 ft 10 in (28.59 m)
- Wingspan: 129 ft 2 in (39.36 m)
- Height: 28 ft 4 in (8.63 m)
- Wing area: 1,640 sq ft (152 m^{2})
- Airfoil:

- Root: Republic R-4,40-318-1
- Tip: Republic R-4,40-413-.6

- Empty weight: 65,000 lb (29,484 kg)
- Gross weight: 101,400 lb (45,994 kg)
- Fuel capacity: 5,000 US gal (4,200 imp gal; 19,000 L)
- Powerplant: 4 × Pratt & Whitney R-4360-31 Wasp Major 28-cyl. four-row air-cooled radial piston engines, 3,250 hp (2,420 kW) each
- Propellers: 4-bladed Curtiss, 16 ft 1 in (4.9 m) diameter reversible-pitch constant-speed propellers

Performance

- Maximum speed: 470 mph (760 km/h, 410 kn)
- Cruise speed: 400 mph (640 km/h, 350 kn) at 40,000 ft (12,000 m)
- Stall speed: 104 mph (167 km/h, 90 kn)
- Range: 4,500 mi (7,200 km, 3,900 nmi)
- Service ceiling: 44,000 ft (13,000 m)
- Rate of climb: 5,000 ft/min (25 m/s)
- Wing loading: 61.8 lb/sq ft (302 kg/m^{2})
- Power/mass: 8.4 lb/hp (5.1 kg/kW)

== See also ==
Aircraft of comparable role, configuration, and era

- Boeing RB-29 Superfortress
- Hughes XF-11
- Lockheed R7V-2/YC-121F Constellation
- SNCASE SE-1010

Related lists

- List of military aircraft of the United States
