= Republic AP-100 =

Canceled American military plane project of the 1940s-1950s

AP-100

General information
- Type: VTOL attack aircraft
- Manufacturer: Republic Aviation
- Status: Canceled project

The Republic Aviation AP-100 was a project for a VTOL, six-turbojet engined, nuclear capable, strike fighter concept. It had three ducted fans in the centre of its fuselage and tail and was a possible contender for the TFX Program. The project was designated as a "fighter", but in fact was a tactical attack aircraft capable of delivering a small nuclear bomb. The weight of the aircraft would have been 38,000 lb (17,237 kg) with its engines generating 14,400 lb (6,532 kg) of thrust.

== Specifications (AP-100, as designed) ==
Data from Air Progress, Spring 1961

General characteristics

- Crew: one pilot (A variant, 2 in B variant)
- Length: 68 ft (21 m)
- Wingspan: 36 ft (11 m)
- Height: 14 ft (4.3 m)
- Wing area: 401 sq ft (37.2 m^{2})
- Gross weight: 38,000 lb (17,237 kg)
- Powerplant: 6 × General Electric J85 turbojet

Performance

- Maximum speed: Mach 2.3
