= Seversky XP-41 =

United States fighter aircraft

XP-41
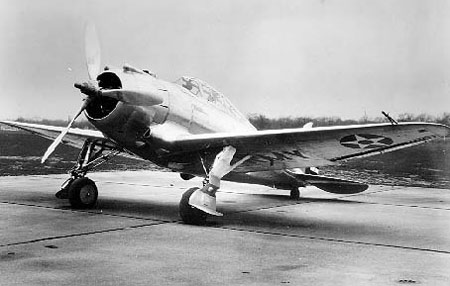

General information
- Type: Fighter
- National origin: United States
- Manufacturer: Seversky Aircraft
- Status: Cancelled
- Number built: 1

History
- First flight: March 1939
- Developed from: Seversky P-35

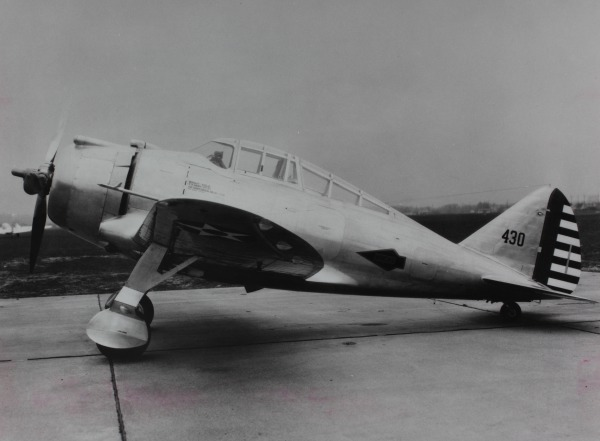
Seversky XP-41

The Seversky XP-41 was a fighter aircraft built in the United States in 1939. A single prototype was modified from the last production Seversky P-35 by adding a new streamlined canopy, a Pratt & Whitney R-1830-19 engine with a two-speed supercharger, and revised landing gear. The XP-41 first flew in March 1939. The aircraft was developed in parallel with the P-43 Lancer, and work was stopped when the USAAC showed a preference for the latter.

== Specifications (XP-41) ==
Data from

General characteristics

- Crew: One
- Length: 27 ft 0 in (8.2 m)
- Wingspan: 36 ft 0 in (11.0 m)
- Height: 12 ft 6 in (3.8 m)
- Wing area: 219.5 sq ft (20.4 m^{2})
- Empty weight: 5,390 lb (2,450 kg)
- Gross weight: 6,600 lb (3,000 kg)
- Max takeoff weight: 7,200 lb (3,273 kg)
- Powerplant: 1 × Pratt & Whitney R-1830-19 radial engine with a two-speed supercharger, 1,200 hp (895 kW)

Performance

- Maximum speed: 323 mph (517 km/h, 281 kn)
- Cruise speed: 292 mph (470 km/h, 254 kn)
- Range: 730 mi (1,168 km, 630 nmi)
- Service ceiling: 31,500 ft (9,600 m)
- Wing loading: 30.1 lb/sq ft (147.1 kg/m^{2})
- Power/mass: 0.18 hp/lb (0.30 kW/kg)

Armament

- Guns: 1 × 0.50 in machine gun and 1 × 0.30 in machine gun

== See also ==
Related development

- Republic P-43 Lancer
- Republic P-47 Thunderbolt
- Seversky P-35

Related lists

- List of fighter aircraft
- List of military aircraft of the United States

== Bibliography ==
- Green, William and Gordon Swanborough. "The End of the Beginning...The Seversky P-35". Air Enthusiast, No. 10, July–September 1979, pp. 8–21. ISSN 0143-5450
