= Seversky SEV-3 =

American three-seat amphibian monoplane

SEV-3
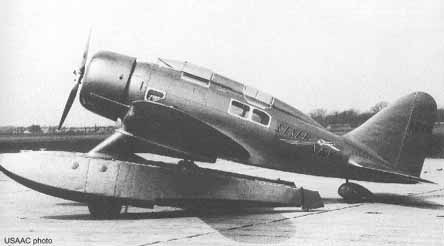

General information
- Type: Three-seat amphibian
- National origin: United States
- Manufacturer: Seversky Aircraft
- Designer: Alexander Kartveli

History
- First flight: 1933

The Seversky SEV-3 was an American three-seat amphibian monoplane, the first aircraft designed and built by the Seversky Aircraft Corporation.

== Design and development ==
The SEV-3 was an all-metal cantilever low-wing monoplane powered by a nose-mounted 420 hp (313 kW) Wright J-6 Whirlwind radial engine. It had two cockpits in tandem, a forward cockpit for the pilot and a rear cockpit for two passengers, both with sliding canopies. It could either be fitted with twin amphibious floats which had main wheels fitted in the floats to allow it to operate from land, or with a fixed tailwheel undercarriage with the mainwheels enclosed in large fairings.

The SEV-3 first flew as a floatplane in June 1933, demonstrating excellent performance as both an amphibian and a landplane. It was built in small numbers mainly for export.

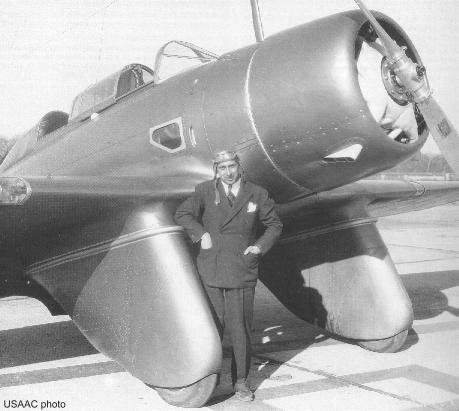
Alexander de Seversky standing before the SEV-3XAR, autumn 1934

== Operational history ==
An SEV-3 established a world speed record for piston-engined amphibians in 1933, and on 15 September 1935, a Wright Cyclone-powered SEV-3 set a record of 230 mph (370.8 km/h) which stood for 49 years. A landplane version was also developed with conventional landing gear.

The design influenced a long line of Seversky and later Republic aircraft, eventually leading to the development of the P-47 Thunderbolt. A landplane version was used by the United States Army Air Corps as a basic trainer with the designation BT-8, 30 of which were ordered in 1935. This proved grossly underpowered and was quickly replaced by the North American BT-9.

One BT-8 was delivered to Bolling Field, on 11 June 1936, for use by Chief of the Air Corps Major General Oscar Westover, and assigned to the 14th Bombardment Squadron, GHQ Air Force. It replaced an O-38F, which was reassigned to the 21st Observation Squadron, GHQ Air Force, for general flying.

== Operators ==
Spain

- Spanish Republican Air Force

Colombia

- Colombian Air Force

== Variants ==
SEV-3XAR

Landplane trainer

SEV-3XLR
Landplane
SEV-3M-WW
Amphibian for the Colombian Air Force, six built (only delivered four to Colombia), with Wright Whirlwind engines.
BT-8
Landplane basic-trainer for the United States Army Air Corps, developed from SEV-3XAR. 30 built.
SEV-X-BT
multi-discipline trainer version of the BT-8 with retractable undercarriage. The sole SEV-X-BT lost in competition to the North American BT-9 and was reportedly scrapped for spares to service the Seversky 2PA.

== Specifications (BT-8) ==
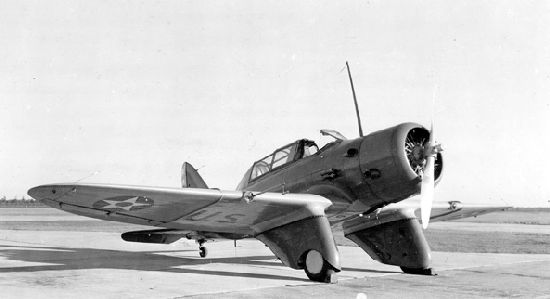
BT-8

Data from United States Military Aircraft since 1909

General characteristics

- Crew: 2
- Length: 24 ft 4 in (7.42 m)
- Wingspan: 36 ft 0 in (10.98 m)
- Wing area: 220 sq ft (20.4 m^{2})
- Empty weight: 3,017 lb (1,317 kg)
- Gross weight: 4,050 lb (1,841 kg)
- Powerplant: 1 × Pratt & Whitney R-985-11 Wasp Junior , 450 hp (336 kW)

Performance

- Maximum speed: 175 mph (282 km/h, 152 kn)

== See also ==
Related development

- Seversky P-35

Related lists

- List of flying boats and floatplanes
