= List of Rolls-Royce Merlin variants =

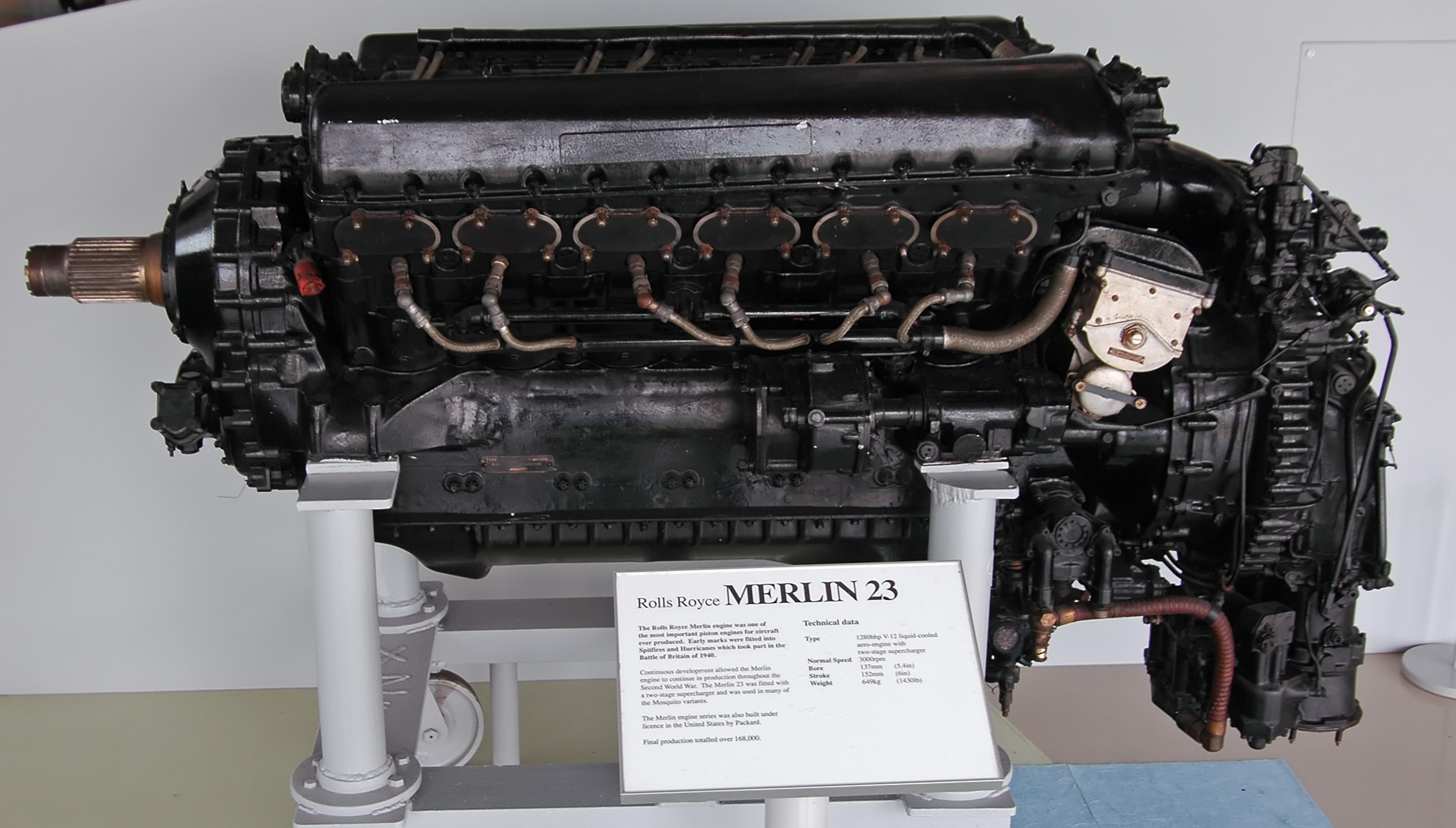
Rolls-Royce Merlin 23

This is a list of Rolls-Royce Merlin variants. Engines of a similar power output were typically assigned different model numbers based on supercharger or propeller gear ratios, differences in cooling system or carburettors, engine block construction, starting system, or arrangement of engine controls. All Merlin engines except versions 131 and 135 were "right hand tractor", i.e. the propeller rotated clockwise viewed from behind.

== Variant table ==
Variant	Take-off power	Combat power	Application	Notes
PV-12	740 hp (552 kW) at 12,000-foot (3,700 m) equivalent			The initial design using an evaporative cooling system. Two built, passed bench Type Testing in July 1934. First flown 21 February 1935.
Merlin B	950 hp (708 kW) at 11,000-foot (3,400 m) equivalent			Two built, ethylene glycol liquid cooling system introduced. "Ramp" cylinder heads (inlet valves were at a 45-degree angle to the cylinder). Passed Type Testing February 1935.
Merlin C	950 hp (708 kW) at 11,000-foot (3,400 m) equivalent			Development of Merlin B; Crankcase and cylinder blocks became three separate castings with bolt-on cylinder heads. First flight in Hawker Horsley 21 December 1935.
Merlin E	955 hp (712 kW) constant output	1,045 hp (779 kW) maximum rating	Supermarine Spitfire prototype	Similar to C with minor design changes. Passed 50-hour civil test in December 1935. Failed military 100-hour test in March 1936.
Merlin F				(Merlin I) Similar to C and E. First flight in Horsley 16 July 1936. This became the first production engine; and was designated as the Merlin I. The Merlin continued with the "ramp" head, but this was not a success and only 172 were made. The Fairey Battle was the first production aircraft to be powered by the Merlin I and first flew on 10 March 1936.
Merlin G		1,030 hp (768 kW)		(Merlin II) Replaced "ramp" cylinder heads with parallel pattern heads (valves parallel to the cylinder) scaled up from the Kestrel engine. 400 Hour flight endurance tests carried out at RAE July 1937; Acceptance test 22 September 1937. It was first widely delivered as the 1,030-horsepower (770 kW) Merlin II in 1938, and production was quickly ramped up.
Merlin I	890 hp (664 kW) at 2,850 rpm		Fairey Battle Mk.I	First production Merlin; 172 built. Merlin I through III used 100% glycol coolant.
Merlin II (RM 1S)	880 hp (656 kW) at 3,000 rpm	1,030 hp (768 kW) at 3,000 rpm at 5,500 ft (1,676 m) with + 6 psi (41 kPa) boost	Spitfire Mk.I, Defiant Mk.I, Hurricane Mk.I, Sea Hurricane Mk.I, Battle Mk.I	Used 100% glycol coolant. First production Merlin II delivered 10 August 1937.
Merlin III (RM 1S)	880 hp (656 kW) at 3,000 rpm	1,310 hp (977 kW) at 3,000 rpm at 9,000 ft (2,743 m) with 100 octane fuel and +12 psi (83 kPa) boost (5-minute limit).	Spitfire Mk.I, Defiant Mk.I, Hurricane Mk.I, Sea Hurricane Mk.I, Battle Mk.I	Variant of Merlin II with universal propeller shaft, able to be fitted with de Havilland or Rotol propellers. From late 1939, using 100 octane fuel and + 12 psi (83 kPa) boost, the Merlin III developed 1,310 hp (977 kW) at 3,000 rpm at 9,000 ft (2,700 m). Later developing 1,440 hp (1,074 kW) at 3,000 rpm, +16 psi (110 kPa) boost at 5,500 ft (1,676 m) for the Sea Hurricane. Using 87 Octane fuel the power ratings were the same as the Merlin II. First production Merlin III delivered 1 July 1938.
Merlin VIII (RM 3M)	1,080 hp (805 kW) at 3,000 rpm	1,275 hp (951 kW) at 3,000 rpm, +9 psi (62 kPa) boost, sea level with 100 octane	Fulmar Mk.I	Lower gearing on supercharger to give improved performance at low altitudes
Merlin X (RM 1SM)	1,280 hp (954 kW) at 3,000 rpm	1,280 hp (954 kW) at 3,000 rpm, +10 psi (69 kPa) boost, sea level	Halifax Mk.I, Wellington Mk.II, Whitley Mk.V and Whitley Mk.VII	1,130 hp (843 kW) at 3,000 rpm at 5,250 ft (1,600 m) with maximum boost pressure +10 psi (69 kPa); this was the first production Merlin to use a two-speed supercharger; Used in Halifax Mk.I, Wellington Mk.II, and Whitley Mk.V bombers. First production Merlin X delivered 5 December 1938.
Merlin XII (RM 3S)	1,175 hp (876 kW) at 3,000 rpm	1,280 hp (954 kW) at 3,000 rpm, +12 psi (83 kPa) boost, 10,500 ft (3,200 m)	Spitfire Mk.II	Coffman cartridge starter. First version of Merlin to use 30/70% glycol/water coolant with reinforced construction, able to use constant boost pressure of up to +12 psi (83 kPa) using 100 octane fuel. First production Merlin XII, 2 September 1939.
Merlin XX (RM 3SM)	1,280 hp (954 kW) at 3,000 rpm	1,490 hp (1,111 kW) at 3,000 rpm, +16 psi (110 kPa) boost, with 100 Octane fuel at 12,500 ft (3,810 m).	Beaufighter Mk.II, Defiant Mk.II, Halifax Mk.II, Halifax Mk.V, Hurricane Mk.II and Hurricane Mk.IV, Lancaster Mk.I, Lancaster Mk.III, Spitfire Mk.III	Had a two speed supercharger giving boost pressures of up to + 14 psi (97 kPa). First production Merlin XX, 4 July 1940. (Note: In August 1940 drawings of the Merlin XX were sent to the Packard Motor Car Company and used as the basis for the Packard Merlin 28.)
Merlin 21 (RM 3SM)	1,280 hp (954 kW) at 3,000 rpm	1,490 hp (1,111 kW) at 3,000 rpm, +16 psi (110 kPa) boost, 12,500 ft (3,810 m)	de Havilland Mosquito Mk.I, Mk.II, Mk.III, Mk.IV and Mk.VI	Merlin XX with direction of coolant flow reversed for Mosquito wing radiator installation
Merlin 22 (RM 3SM)	1,390 hp (1,037 kW) at 3,000 rpm	1,435 hp (1,070 kW) at 3,000 rpm, +16 psi (110 kPa) boost, 11,000 ft	Lancaster Mk.I, York Mk.I	Similar to Merlin XX with two-piece cylinder block designed by Rolls-Royce
Merlin 23 (RM 3SM)	1,390 hp (1,037 kW) at 3,000 rpm	1,435 hp (1,070 kW) at 3,000 rpm, +16 psi (110 kPa) boost, 11,000 ft (3,353 m)	de Havilland Mosquito Mk.I, Mk.II, Mk.IV, Mk.VI, Mk.XII and Mk.XIII	Merlin 22 with direction of coolant flow reversed for Mosquito wing radiator installation
Merlin 24 (RM 3SM)	1,610 hp (1,201 kW) at 3,000 rpm	1,510 hp (1,126 kW) at 3,000 rpm, +18 psi (124 kPa) boost, 9,250 ft (2,819 m)	Lancaster Mk.I, Lancaster Mk.VII, York Mk.I and Halifax Mk.II	Similar to Merlin 22 but with improved boost control to permit increased ratings
Merlin 25 (RM 3SM)	1,610 hp (1,201 kW) at 3,000 rpm	1,510 hp (1,126 kW) at 3,000 rpm, +18 psi (124 kPa) boost, 9,250 ft (2,819 m)	de Havilland Mosquito Mk.VI and Mk.XIX	Merlin 24 with direction of coolant flow reversed for Mosquito wing radiator installation
Merlin 27 (RM 3SM)	1,610 hp (1,201 kW) at 3,000 rpm	1,510 hp (1,126 kW) at 3,000 rpm, +18 psi (124 kPa) boost, 9,250 ft (2,819 m)	Hurricane Mk.IV	As Merlin 22 with different gear reduction ratio
Merlin 28 (RM 3SM)	1,300 hp (969 kW) at 3,000 rpm	1,240 hp (925 kW) at 3,000 rpm, +9 psi (62 kPa) boost, 11,500 ft (3,505 m)	Lancaster Mk.III, Kittyhawk II (Curtiss P-40F)	Built by Packard, similar to Merlin XX with two-piece cylinder block designed by Packard. Known as the V-1650-1 when supplied to USAAF
Merlin 29 (RM 3SM)	1,300 hp (969 kW) at 3,000 rpm	1,240 hp (925 kW) at 3,000 rpm, +9 psi (62 kPa) boost, 11,500 ft (3,505 m)	Hurricane Mk.XII (Canadian-built), Kittyhawk II (Curtiss P-40F)	Similar to Merlin 28 with different reduction gear ratio and propeller shaft splined to suit American propellers
Merlin 30 (RM 2M)	1,300 hp (969 kW) at 3,000 rpm	1,360 hp (1,014 kW) at 3,000 rpm, +12 psi (83 kPa) boost, 6,000 ft (1,829 m)	Barracuda Mk.I and Fulmar Mk.II	Similar to Merlin VIII but different supercharger (smaller diameter impeller with higher gearing)
Merlin 31 (RM 3SM)	1,300 hp (969 kW) at 3,000 rpm	1,240 hp (925 kW) at 3,000 rpm, +9 psi (62 kPa) boost, 11,500 ft (3,505 m)	Mosquito Mk.XX (Canadian), Mosquito Mk.40 (Australia)	Packard-built version of Merlin 21
Merlin 32 (RM 5M)	1,620 hp (1,208 kW) at 3,000 rpm	1,640 hp (1,223 kW) at 3,000 rpm, +18 psi (124 kPa) boost, 2,000 ft (610 m)	Barracuda Mk.II, Seafire Mk.II, Hurricane Mk.V, Spitfire PR Mk. XIII	A "low altitude" version of Merlin with cropped supercharger impellers for increased power at lower altitudes, as per the Merlin XXX; fitted with a Coffman engine starter; used mainly in Fleet Air Arm aircraft. First production Merlin 32 delivered 17 June 1942.
Merlin 33 (RM 3SM)	1,400 hp (1,044 kW) at 3,000 rpm	1,400 hp (1,044 kW) at 3,000 rpm, +9 psi (62 kPa) boost, 11,500 ft (3,505 m)	Mosquito XX (Canadian), Mosquito 40 (Australia)	Packard-built Merlin 23
Merlin 35	1,280 hp (954 kW) at 3,000 rpm, 54.3 inHg (1,380 mmHg) +12 psi (83 kPa) boost	1,245 hp (928 kW) at 3,000 rpm at 11,500 ft (3,500 m)	Boulton Paul Balliol, Avro Athena	Merlin T24-2 with single-speed, single-stage supercharger
Merlin 38 (RM 3SM)	1,400 hp (1,044 kW) at 3,000 rpm	1,400 hp (1,044 kW) at 3,000 rpm, +9 psi (62 kPa) boost, 11,500 ft (3,505 m)	Lancaster I and III	Packard-built Merlin 22
Merlin 45 (RM 5S)	1,185 hp (884 kW) at 3,000 rpm	1,515 hp (1,130 kW) at 3,000 rpm, +16 psi (110 kPa) boost, 11,500 ft (3,505 m)	Spitfire Mk.V, Spitfire PR Mk.IG (later redesignated Spitfire PR.VII), Spitfire PR Mk.IV, Seafire Mk.IB, Seafire Mk.IIC	A variant of the Merlin XX fitted with single-stage, single-speed supercharger for Spitfire use. First production Merlin 45 delivered 13 January 1941. First of specialised engines for Spitfire Mk V variants and early Seafires.
Merlin 45M	1,230 hp (917 kW) at 3,000 rpm	1,585 hp (1,182 kW) at 3,000 rpm, +18 psi (124 kPa) boost, 2,750 ft (838 m)	Spitfire LF Mk.V	Version of Merlin 45 with "cropped" (smaller diameter) supercharger impeller allowing greater boost at low altitudes.
Merlin 46 (RM 6S)	1,100 hp (820 kW) at 3,000 rpm	1,415 hp (1,055 kW) at 3,000 rpm, +16 psi (110 kPa) boost, 14,000 ft (4,267 m)	Spitfire Mk.V, Spitfire PR Mk.IV, Spitfire Mk.VII, Seafire Mk.IB and Seafire Mk.IIC	Similar to Merlin 45 with larger supercharger impeller diameter
Merlin 47 (RM 6S)	1,100 hp (820 kW) at 3,000 rpm	1,415 hp (1,055 kW) at 3,000 rpm, +16 psi (110 kPa) boost, 1,400 ft (427 m)	Spitfire HF Mk.VI high-altitude intercepter	Similar to Merlin 46 with a Marshall compressor (often called a "blower") to pressurise the cockpit. First production Merlin 47 delivered 2 December 1941.
Merlin 50 (RM 5S)	1,185 hp (884 kW) at 3,000 rpm	1,470 hp (1,096 kW) at 3,000 rpm, +16 psi (110 kPa) boost, 9,250 ft (2,819 m)	Spitfire Mk.V	Low-altitude version with supercharger impeller "cropped" to 9.5 in (241 mm) in diameter. Merlin 50 series was first to use the Bendix Stromberg "negative-g" carburettor.
Merlin 50M (RM 5S)	1,230 hp (917 kW) at 3,000 rpm	1,585 hp (1,182 kW) at 3,000 rpm, +18 psi (124 kPa) boost, 2,750 ft (838 m)	Spitfire LF Mk.V	Similar to Merlin 50 with smaller diameter supercharger impeller
Merlin 55 (RM 5S)	1,185 hp (884 kW) at 3,000 rpm	1,470 hp (1,096 kW) at 3,000 rpm, +16 psi (110 kPa), 9,250 ft (2,819 m)	Spitfire Mk.V and Seafire Mk.III	Similar to Merlin 45 but with two-piece cylinder blocks
Merlin 55M (RM 5S)	1,230 hp (917 kW) at 3,000 rpm	1,585 hp (1,182 kW) at 3,000 rpm, +18 psi (124 kPa) boost, 2,750 ft (838 m)	Spitfire LF Mk.V, Seafire Mk.III	Variant with "cropped" supercharger impellor
Merlin 60 (RM 6SM)	1,390 hp (1,037 kW) at 3,000 rpm	1,110 hp (828 kW) at 2,850 rpm, +9 psi (62 kPa) boost, 29,000 ft (8,839 m)	Wellington Mk.VI	First variant fitted with two-stage, two-speed supercharger; rated for high altitude.
Merlin 61 (RM 8SM)	1,280 hp (954 kW) at 3,000 rpm	1,565 hp (1,167 kW) at 3,000 rpm, +15 psi (103 kPa) boost, 11,250 ft (3,429 m)	Spitfire Mk.IX and Spitfire PR Mk.XI	Production variant of Merlin 60 fitted with a new two-speed two-stage supercharger providing increased power at medium to high altitudes. First British production variant to incorporate two-piece cylinder blocks designed by Rolls-Royce for the Packard Merlin. First production Merlin 61 delivered 2 March 1942.
Merlin 62 (RM 6SM)	1,390 hp (1,037 kW) at 3,000 rpm	1,110 hp (828 kW) at 2,850 rpm, +9 psi (62 kPa) boost, 29,000 ft (8,839 m)	Wellington Mk.VI	Similar to Merlin 60 but with two-piece cylinder blocks
Merlin 63 (RM 8SM)	1,280 hp (954 kW) at 3,000 rpm	1,710 hp (1,275 kW) at 3,000 rpm, +18 psi (124 kPa) boost, 8,500 ft (2,591 m)	Spitfire Mk.VIII, IX, PR.XI	Replaced Merlin 61
Merlin 63A (RM 8SM)	1,280 hp (954 kW) at 3,000 rpm	1,710 hp (1,275 kW) at 3,000 rpm, +18 psi (124 kPa) boost, 8,500 ft (2,591 m)	Spitfire PR Mk.XI	Merlin 63 with crankcase from Merlin 64, but no blower and blanking covers fitted
Merlin 64 (RM 8SM)	1,280 hp (954 kW) at 3,000 rpm	1,710 hp (1,275 kW) at 3,000 rpm, +18 psi (124 kPa) boost, 8,500 ft (2,591 m)	Spitfire Mk.VII	Cabin pressure blower
Merlin 66 (RM 10SM)	1,315 hp (981 kW) at 3,000 rpm	1,705 hp (1,271 kW) at 3,000 rpm, +18 psi (124 kPa) boost, 5,750 ft (1,753 m)	Spitfire LF Mk.VIII LF Mk.IX	Fitted with supercharger rated for low altitude; Bendix-Stromberg anti-g carburettor
Merlin 67 (RM 10SM)	1,315 hp (981 kW) at 3,000 rpm	1,705 hp (1,271 kW) at 3,000 rpm, +18 psi (124 kPa) boost, 5,750 ft (1,753 m)		Similar to Merlin 66 but with reversed coolant flow and 0.42 reduction gear. No production.
Merlin 68	1,670 hp (1,245 kW) at 3,000 rpm	1,710 hp (1,275 kW) at 3,000 rpm, +18 psi (124 kPa) boost, 6,400 ft (1,951 m)	Avro Lincoln, Mustang III (North American P-51B and C)	Packard-built version of Merlin 85. Produced for USAAF as Packard V-1650-7
Merlin 69	1,315 hp (981 kW) at 3,000 rpm	1,705 hp (1,271 kW) at 3,000 rpm, +18 psi (124 kPa) boost, 5,750 ft (1,753 m)	de Havilland Mosquito	Packard version of Merlin 67 - similar to Merlin 66 but with reversed coolant flow and 0.42 reduction gear
Merlin 70 (RM 11SM)	1,250 hp (932 kW) at 3,000 rpm	1,655 hp (1,234 kW) at 3,000 rpm, +18 psi (124 kPa) boost, 10,000 ft (3,048 m)	Spitfire HF Mk.VIII HF.IX, PR.XI	Bendix Stromberg anti-g carburettor
Merlin 71 (RM 11SM)	1,250 hp (932 kW) at 3,000 rpm	1,655 hp (1,234 kW) at 3,000 rpm, +18 psi (124 kPa), 10,000 ft (3,048 m)	Spitfire HF Mk.VII	Cabin pressure blower, Bendix Stromberg anti-g carburettor
Merlin 72 (RM 8SM)	1,280 hp (954 kW) at 3,000 rpm	1,710 hp (1,275 kW) at 3,000 rpm, +18 psi (124 kPa), 8,500 ft (2,591 m)	de Havilland Mosquito PR Mk.IX, B Mk.IX, Mk.XVI and Mk.30. Welkin Mk.I	Similar to Merlin 63 but with reversed coolant flow
Merlin 73 (RM 8SM)	1,280 hp (954 kW) at 3,000 rpm	1,710 hp (1,275 kW) at 3,000 rpm, +18 psi (124 kPa), 8,500 ft (2,591 m)	de Havilland Mosquito Mk.XVI, Welkin Mk.I	Same as Merlin 72 with a cabin pressure blower
Merlin 76 (RM 11SM)	1,250 hp (932 kW) at 3,000 rpm	1,655 hp (1,234 kW) at 3,000 rpm, +18 psi (124 kPa), 10,000 ft (3,048 m)	de Havilland Mosquito PR Mk.XVI, Mk.30, Welkin Mk.I	1,233 hp (919 kW) at 35,000 ft (10,668 m); Fitted with a two-speed, two-stage supercharger and a Bendix Stromberg anti-g carburettor. Dedicated "high altitude" version used in the Westland Welkin high-altitude fighter, and some later Spitfire and de Havilland Mosquito variants.
Merlin 77 (RM 11SM)	1,250 hp (932 kW) at 3,000 rpm	1,655 hp (1,234 kW) at 3,000 rpm, +18 psi (124 kPa), 10,000 ft (3,048 m)	de Havilland Mosquito Mk.XVI, Welkin Mk.I, Spitfire PR Mk.X	Same as Merlin 76 with a pressurising blower
Merlin 85 (RM 10SM)	1,635 hp (1,219 kW) at 3,000 rpm	1,705 hp (1,271 kW) at 3,000 rpm, +18 psi (124 kPa), 5,750 ft (1,753 m)	Lancaster Mk.VI and Lincoln Mk.I	Generally similar to Merlin 66 but with 0.42 reduction gear ratio and intercooler header tank integral with intercooler
Merlin 130/131 (RM 14SM)	2,070 hp (1,544 kW) at 3,000 rpm		de Havilland Hornet F Mk.1, PR Mk.2, F Mk.3, FR Mk.4.	Redesigned "slimline" versions for the de Havilland Hornet. Engine modified to decrease frontal area to a minimum and was the first Merlin series to use down-draught induction systems. Coolant pump moved from the bottom of the engine to the starboard side. Two-speed, two-stage supercharger and S.U. injection carburettor giving a maximum boost of +25 psi (172 kPa). On the Hornet the Merlin 130 was fitted in the starboard nacelle: the Merlin 131, fitted in the port nacelle, was converted to a "reverse" or left-hand tractor engine using an additional idler gear in the reduction gear casing.
Merlin 134/135 (RM 14SM)	2,030 hp (1,514 kW) at 3,000 rpm		de Havilland Sea Hornet F Mk.20, NF Mk.21 and PR Mk.22	Derated 130/131 with maximum boost lowered to +18 psi (124 kPa). With Corliss throttle.
Merlin 224 (RM 3SM)	1,635 hp (1,219 kW) at 3,000 rpm	1,680 hp (1,253 kW) at 3,000 rpm, +18 psi (124 kPa), 2,750 ft (838 m)	Avro Lancaster Mk.I, Mk.III and Mk.X	Packard-built Merlin 24
Merlin 225 (RM 3SM)	1,635 hp (1,219 kW) at 3,000 rpm	1,680 hp (1,253 kW) at 3,000 rpm, +18 psi (124 kPa), 2,500 ft (762 m)	de Havilland Mosquito Mk.25 and Mk.26	Packard-built Merlin 25
Merlin 266 (RM 10SM)	1,670 hp (1,245 kW) at 3,000 rpm	1,710 hp (1,275 kW) at 3,000 rpm, +18 psi (124 kPa), 6,400 ft (1,951 m)t	Spitfire LF Mk.XVI	The prefix "2" indicates engines built by Packard, otherwise as Merlin 66, optimised for low-altitude operation.
Merlin 620		1,175 hp (876 kW) continuous cruising using 2,650 rpm at + 9 psi (62 kPa)	Avro Tudor, Avro York, and Canadair North Star	Capable of emergency rating of 1,795 hp (1,339 kW) at 3,000 rpm using +20 psi (138 kPa) ; civilian engine developed from Merlin 102; two-stage supercharger optimised for medium altitudes, and used an S.U. injection carburettor. Universal Power Plant (UPP) installation similar to that used on Avro Lincoln. The Merlin 620-621 series was designed to operate in the severe climatic conditions encountered on Canadian and long-range North Atlantic air routes.

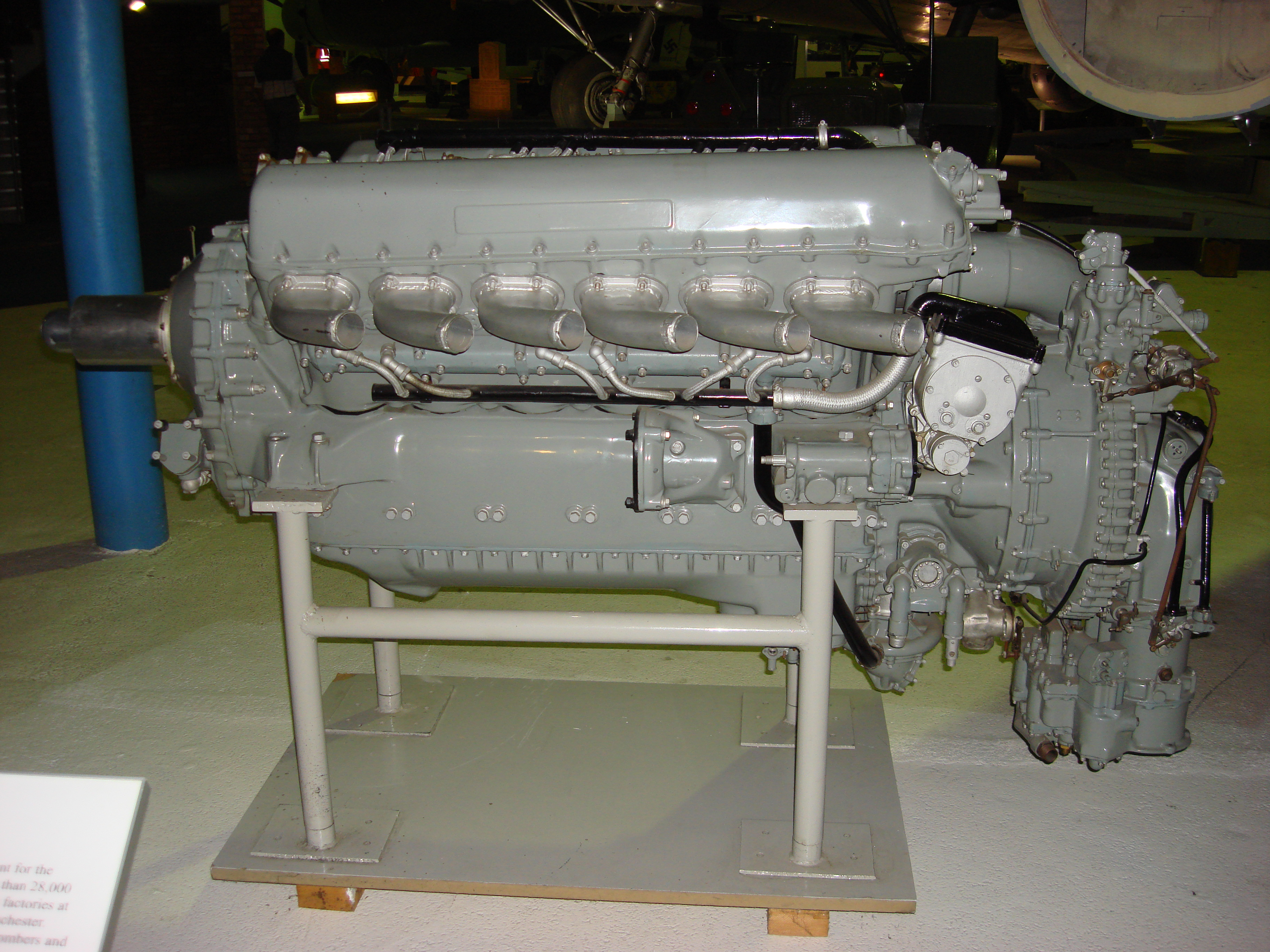
Preserved Merlin XX at the Royal Air Force Museum London

Audio of RR Merlin 66/266 starting.

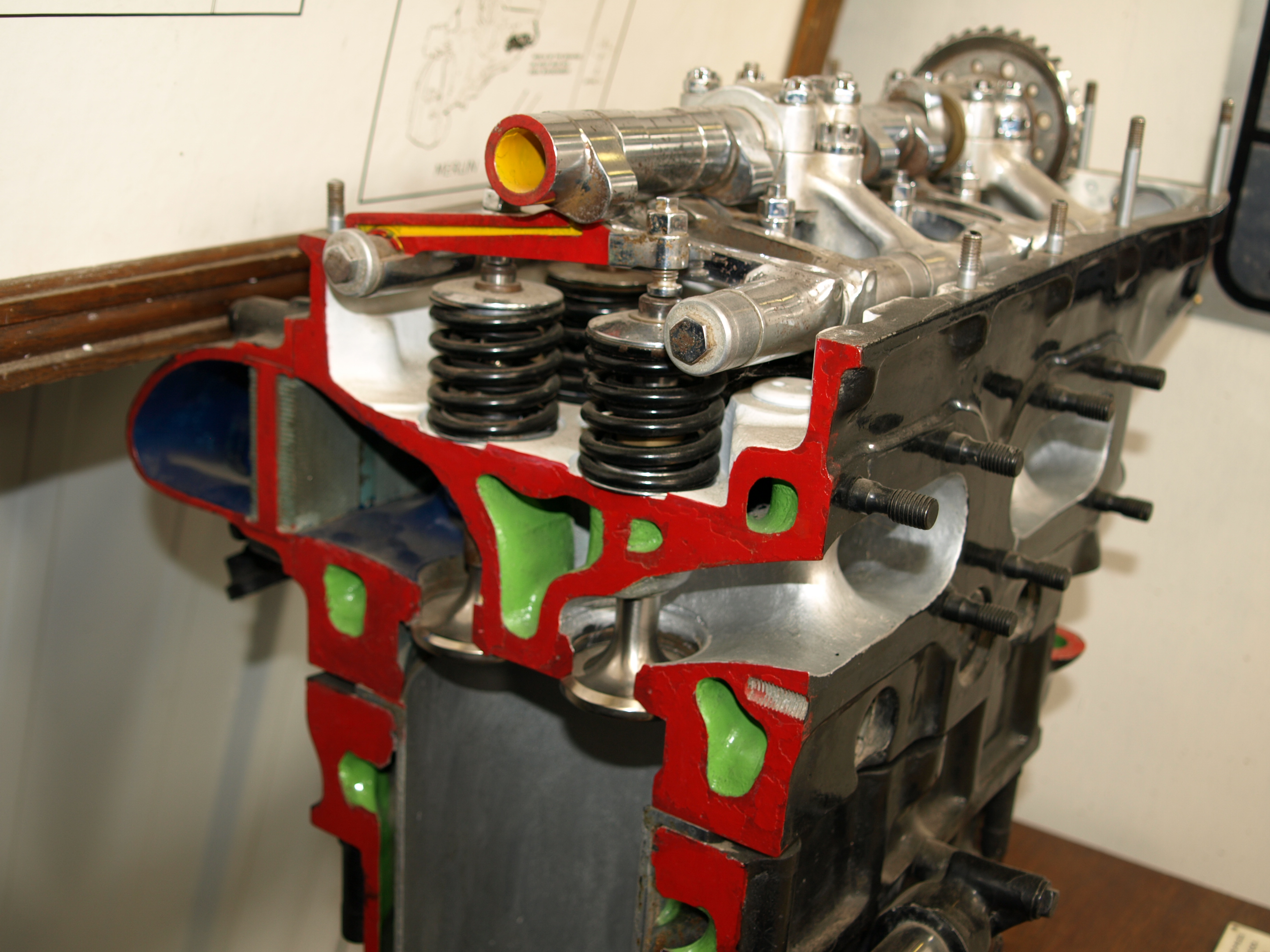
Parallel valve Merlin cylinder head
