= Pratt & Whitney R-2800 Double Wasp =

American WWII-era aircraft engine

R-2800 Double Wasp
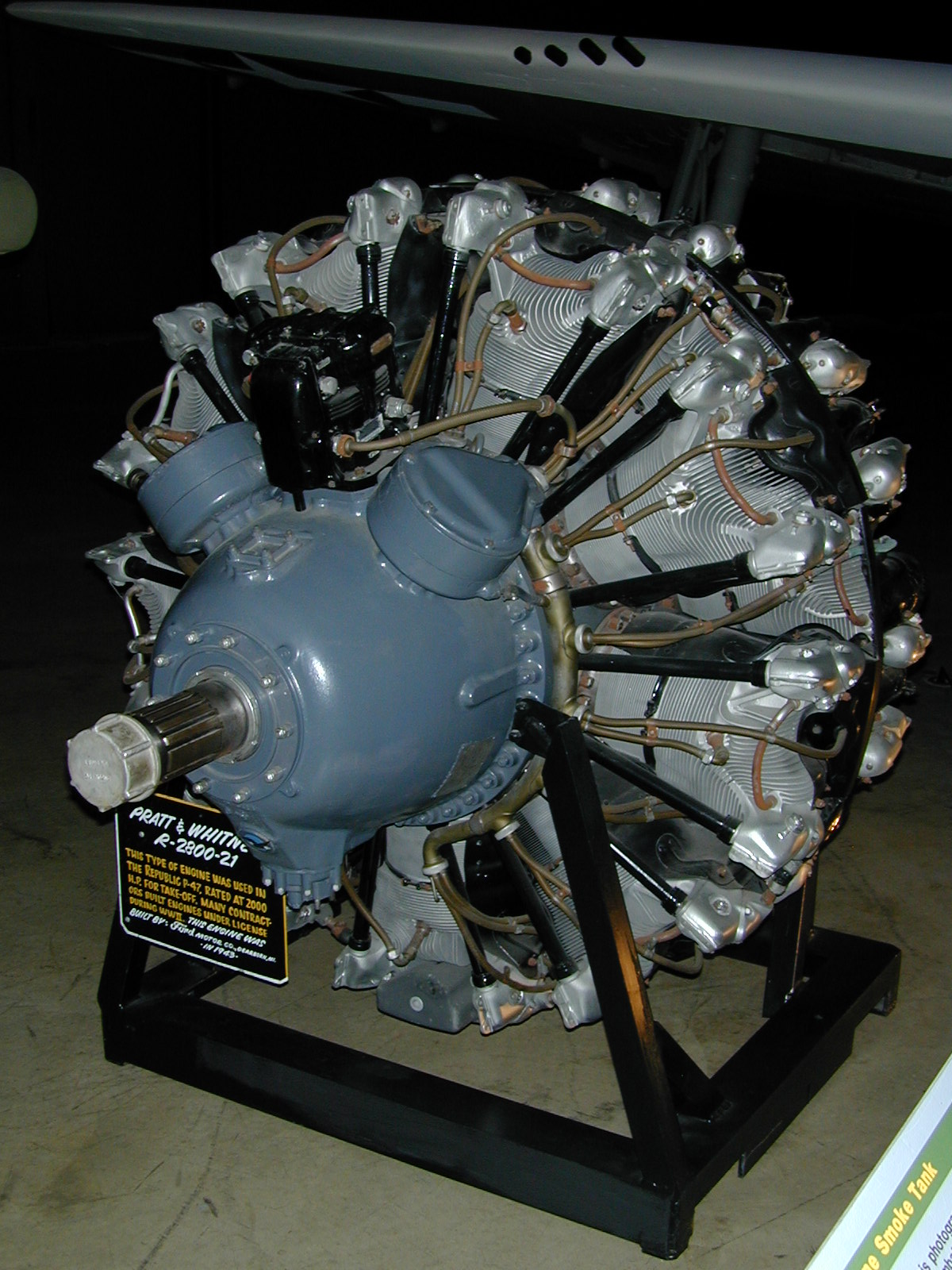
- A preserved R-2800 engine at the National Museum of the United States Air Force
- Type: Radial engine
- National origin: United States
- Manufacturer: Pratt & Whitney
- First run: 1937; First flown May 29, 1940
- Major applications: Convair CV-240 family; Douglas A-26 Invader; Douglas DC-6; Grumman F6F Hellcat; Martin B-26 Marauder; Republic P-47 Thunderbolt; Vought F4U Corsair
- Manufactured: 1939–1960
- Number built: 125,334
- Developed into: Pratt & Whitney R-4360 Wasp Major

The Pratt & Whitney R-2800 Double Wasp is an American twin-row, 18-cylinder, air-cooled radial aircraft engine with a nominal displacement of 2,800 cu in (46 L), and is part of the long-lived Wasp family of engines.

Produced from 1939 to 1960, the R-2800 saw widespread use in major American aircraft during and after World War II, including the Grumman F6F Hellcat, Vought F4U Corsair, and Republic P-47 Thunderbolt. It was developed into numerous military and commercial variants for fighters, attack aircraft, patrol aircraft, transports, and airliners, with changes in supercharging, fuel systems, water injection, reduction gearing, and accessory arrangements.

== Design and development ==
First run in 1937, near the time that the larger 3,347.9 cu in (54.862 L) competing 18-cylinder Wright Duplex-Cyclone's development had been started in May of that year, the 2,804.5 cu in (45.958 L) displacement R-2800 was first flown by 1940, one year before the Duplex-Cyclone. The Double Wasp was more powerful than the world's only other modern 18-cylinder engine, the Gnome-Rhône 18L of 3,442 cu in (56.40 L). (Note: The American Wright Duplex-Cyclone radial of 3,347 cu in (54.85 L) was also under development at the time, and promised to be more powerful than either the P&W or Gnome-Rhone radials.)

The Double Wasp was much smaller in displacement than either of the other 18-cylinder designs, and heat dissipation was a greater problem. To enable more efficient cooling, the usual practice of casting or forging the cylinder head cooling fins that had been effective enough for other engine designs was discarded, and instead, much thinner and closer-pitched cooling fins were machined from the solid metal of the cylinder-head forging. The fins were all cut at the same time by a gang of milling saws, automatically guided as it fed across the head in such a way that the bottom of the grooves rose and fell to make the roots of the fins follow the contour of the head, with the elaborate process substantially increasing the surface area of the fins.

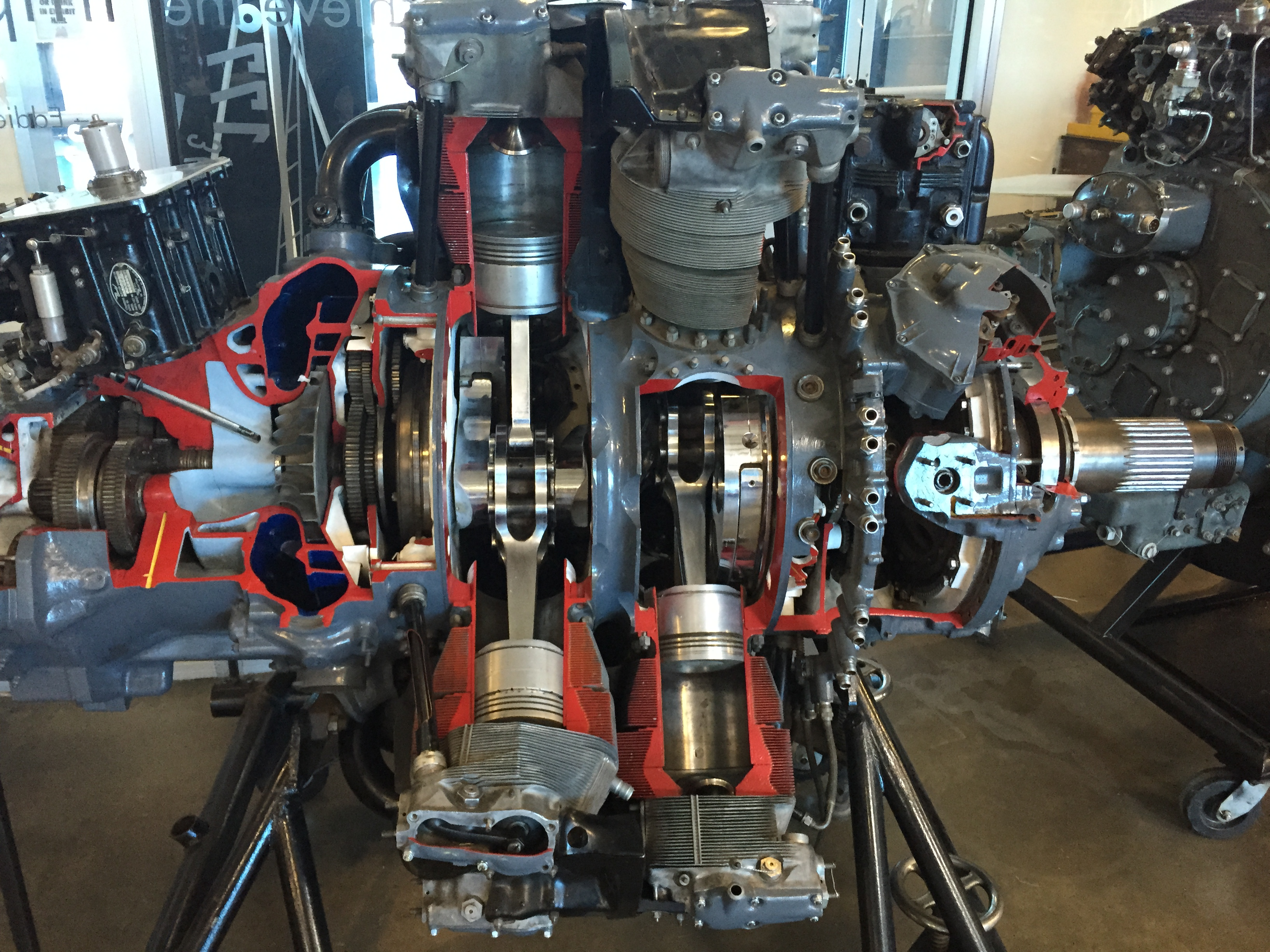
Cutaway of a Pratt & Whitney R-2800 Double Wasp

The twin distributors on the Double Wasp were prominently mounted on the upper surface of the forward gear reduction housing - with one of the pair of magnetos mounted between them on most models - and almost always prominently visible within a cowling, with the conduits for the spark plug wires emerging from the distributors' cases either directly forward or directly behind them, or on the later C-series R-2800s with the two-piece gear reduction housings, on the "outboard" sides of the distributor casings.

When the R-2800 was introduced in 1939, it was capable of producing 2,000 hp (1,500 kW), for a specific power value of 0.71 hp/cu in (32 kW/L). The design of conventional air-cooled radial engines had become so scientific and systematic by then that the Double Wasp was introduced with a smaller incremental power increase than was typical of earlier engines. Nevertheless, in 1941, the power output of production models increased to 2,100 hp (1,600 kW), and to 2,400 hp (1,800 kW) late in the war. Even more was coaxed from experimental models, with fan-cooled subtypes like the R-2800-57 producing 2,800 hp (2,100 kW), but in general, the R-2800 was a rather highly developed powerplant right from the beginning.

=== WWII ===
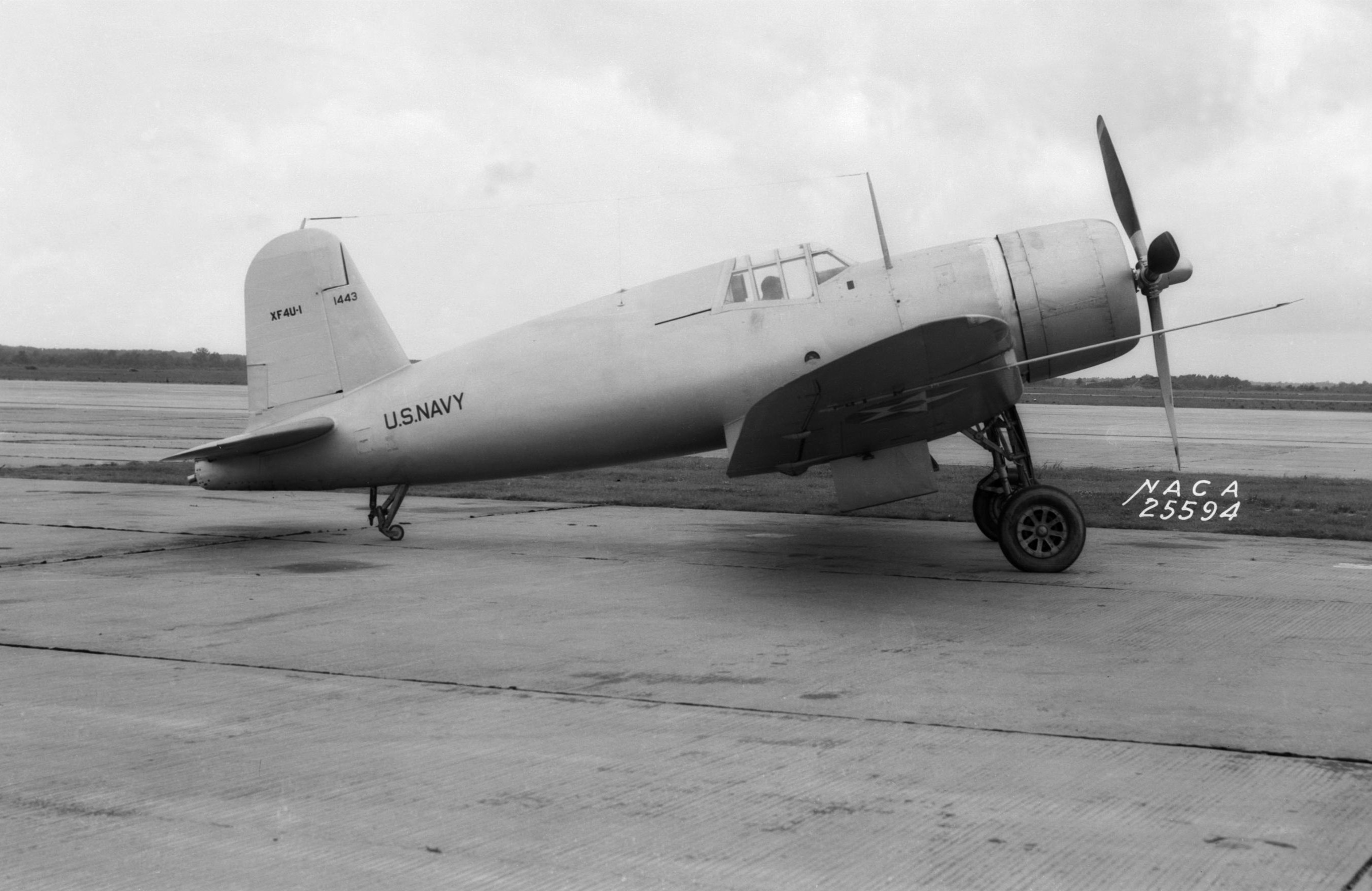
The first prototype F4U Corsair, the earliest aircraft specifically designed to use the Double Wasp

The R-2800 powered several types of fighters and medium bombers during the war, including the US Navy's Vought F4U Corsair, with the XF4U-1 prototype Corsair becoming the first airframe to fly (as originally designed) with the Double Wasp in its XR-2800-4 prototype version on May 29, 1940, and the first single-engine American fighter plane to exceed 400 mph (640 km/h) in level flight during October 1940. The R-2800 also powered the Corsair's naval rival, the Grumman F6F Hellcat, the US Army Air Forces' Republic P-47 Thunderbolt (which unusually, for single-engined aircraft, used a General Electric turbocharger), the twin-engine Martin B-26 Marauder and Douglas A-26 Invader, as well as the first purpose-built twin-engine radar-equipped night fighter, the Northrop P-61 Black Widow.

When the US entered the war in December 1941, designs advanced rapidly, and long-established engines such as the Wright Cyclone and Double Wasp were re-rated on fuel of much higher octane rating (anti-knock value) to give considerably more power. By 1944, versions of the R-2800 powering late-model P-47s (and other aircraft) had a rating (experimental) of 2,800 hp (2,100 kW) on 115-grade fuel with water injection.

After World War II, the engine was used in the Korean War, and surplus World War II aircraft powered by the Double Wasp served with other countries well past the Korean War, some being retired as late as the latter part of the 1960s when the aircraft were replaced.

=== Peacetime ===
Engines grow in power with development, but a major war demands the utmost performance from engines fitted to aircraft whose life in front-line service was unlikely to exceed 50 hours flying, over a period of only a month or two. In peacetime, however, the call was for reliability over a period of perhaps a dozen years, and the R-2800's reliability commended its use for long-range patrol aircraft and for the Douglas DC-6, Martin 4-0-4, and Convair 240 transports. The last two were twin-engine aircraft of size, passenger capacity, and high wing loading comparable to the DC-4 - itself usually powered by the R-2000 bored-out version of the Twin Wasp - and the first Constellations, which mostly used Wright Aeronautical's large Duplex-Cyclones.

The Double Wasp still flies in restored vintage warbird aircraft displayed at air shows, and sees service worldwide on aircraft such as the Canadair CL-215 water-bomber. In addition, R-2800s continue to power Douglas DC-6 cargo and fuel-carrying aircraft in locations such as Alaska. A total of 125,334 R-2800 engines were produced between 1939 and 1960.

== Variants ==
This is a representative, though not exhaustive, list of R-2800 variants, describing some of the mechanical changes made during development of the Double Wasp. Power ratings varied by engine model, fuel grade, supercharger or turbosupercharger installation, water or anti-detonant injection equipment, and aircraft installation. Unless otherwise stated, ratings below are the ratings given by the cited source for the listed variant or installation.

The R-2800 was developed through five basic design series: "A", "B", "C", "D", and "E". The "A" and "B" series were very similar, while the "B" and "C" series were by far the most numerous. The "C" series was a complete redesign of the "A" and "B" series. The "D" series was a one-off variation based on the "B" series, while the "E" series used a modified "CB" power section with hydraulically driven superchargers. Pratt & Whitney's internal variant identification incorporated the series letter as part of the designation, for example, Double Wasp S1A4-G ("A" series) and Double Wasp CB17 ("C" series).

Note
Suffixes such as -S14A-G denote engines developed for export to other countries.

Data from White (Airlife) unless otherwise cited:

=== Military ===
The dash number for each military type (e.g.: -21) was allocated to identify the complete engine model in accordance with the specification under which the engine was manufactured. Thus, dash numbers did not necessarily indicate the sequence in which the engines were manufactured. For example, the -18W was a "C" series engine, built from 1945, whereas the -21 was a "B" series engine, built from 1943.

Until 1940, the armed forces adhered strictly to the convention that engines built for the Army Air Forces used engine model numbers with odd numeric suffixes (e.g.: -5), while those built for the US Navy used even (e.g.: -8). After 1940, however, in the interests of standardization, engines were sometimes built to a joint Army-Navy contract, in which case the engines used a common numeric suffix (e.g., the -10 was used by both Army and Navy aircraft).

The suffix W e.g.: -10W denotes a sub-series modified to use water injection. The "Anti-Detonant Injection" (ADI) system injected a mixture of water and methanol into the carburetor to increase power for short periods. Several models of the R-2800s were fitted with ADI as standard equipment and were not given the W suffix. (Note: P&W authorised the use of: 50% methanol, 50% water; 60% methanol, 40% water; 25% methanol, 25% ethanol, 50% water; or 60% methanol, 39% water, 1% anti-corrosive oil.) Few commercial aircraft used water injection.

"A" Series:

R-2800-1
1,500 hp (1,100 kW) at 2,400 rpm at 7,500 ft (2,300 m). Production prototype of "A" series engines with the first flight test on July 29, 1939. Single-speed two-stage supercharger. Production = 2 (P&W). Tested in Vultee YA-19B.
R-2800-5
1,850 hp (1,380 kW) at 2,600 rpm at 2,700 ft (820 m). Main production "A" series engine used in Martin B-26A, early B series and XB-26D and Curtiss C-55/XC-46. Production = 1,429 (P&W 475, Ford 954.)
R-2800-39
2,000 hp (1,500 kW)
Double Wasp S1A4-G
1,850 hp (1,380 kW)

"B" Series:

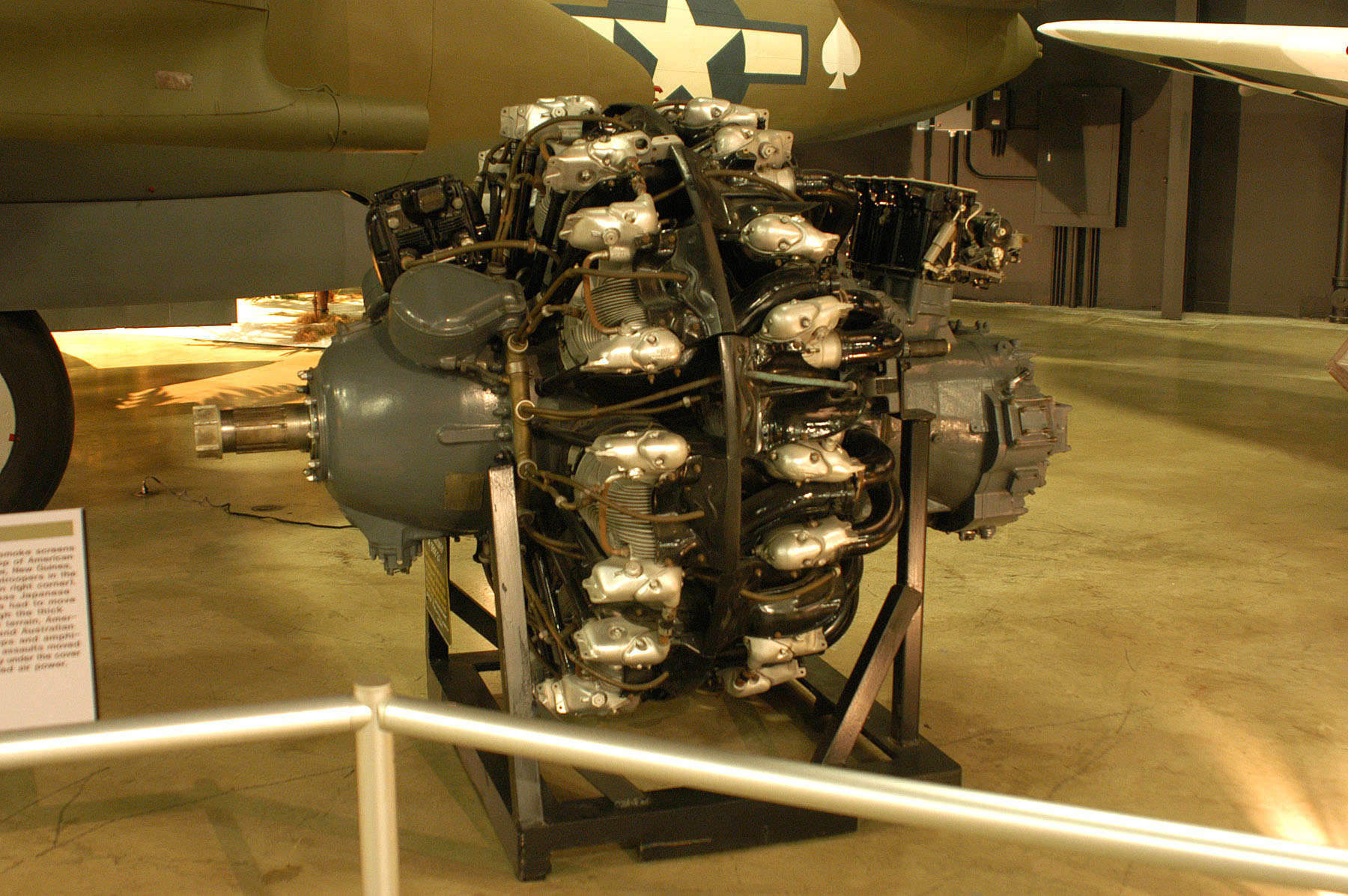
A preserved "B Series" R-2800-21 or -59. The A and B series can be most readily identified by their smooth, single-piece nose casings. This photo shows the simplified tubular ignition harness fitted to some R-2800 subtypes. (Note: The placard on this R-2800, photographed in the National Museum of the United States Air Force says that this is a -21, built by Ford in 1943: components such as ignition harnesses were interchangeable between the likes of -21 and -59 series engines.)

R-2800-8
2,000 hp (1,500 kW) at 2,700 rpm at 1,000 ft (300 m); 1,800 hp (1,300 kW) at 2,700 rpm at 15,500 ft (4,700 m). First series production "B" Series engine using a two-stage, two-speed supercharger, and with internal engineering changes resulting in increased power and reliability. Updraft Bendix-Stromberg PT-13D-4 pressure carburetor. First production engines delivered to USN on November 11, 1941. Used in Brewster F3A-1, Goodyear FG-1, Vought F4U-1 and F4U-2. Production = 3,903 (P&W 2,194; Nash 1,709.)
R-2800-8W
2,250 hp (1,680 kW) WEP with water injection. First production engine using ADI equipment, major production version of -8, and used in some versions of F4U Corsair. Production = 8,668 (P&W 5,574; Nash 3,094.)
R-2800-10 and R-2800-10W
2,000 hp (1,500 kW) at 2,700 rpm at 1,000 ft (300 m); 1,800 hp (1,300 kW) at 2,700 rpm at 15,500 ft (4,700 m); up to 2,250 hp (1,680 kW) WEP with water injection. Similar to the -8 series, apart from the downdraft PT-13G2-10 and PT-13G6-10 (-10W) carburetor. Used in Curtiss XP-60E, Grumman F6F-3 (-10; late production -10W) and F6F-5 (-10W) series and Northrop XP-61, YP-61, and P-61A-1. Production = 4,621 -10 (P&W 2,931; Nash 1,690) and 12,940 -10W (P&W 3,040; Nash 9,900); Total = 17,561.
R-2800-21
2,000 hp (1,500 kW) at 2,700 rpm at 2,500 ft (760 m); 2,000 hp (1,500 kW) at 2,700 rpm at 25,000 ft (7,600 m). First production variant fed by a General Electric C-1 turbosupercharger. (Note: Prototype and production prototypes were the "A" series R-2800-17 (one built) and R-2800-35 (11 built), fitted to the XP-47B and early P-47Bs respectively.) Designed for use in the Republic P-47B, C, D, G and XP-47F and K. Production = 5,720 (P&W 1,049; Ford 4,671.)
R-2800-25
2,000 hp (1,500 kW) — for Northrop P-61 Black Widow
R-2800-27
2,000 hp (1,500 kW)
R-2800-31
2,000 hp (1,500 kW)
R-2800-41
2,000 hp (1,500 kW)
R-2800-43
2,000 hp (1,500 kW)
R-2800-51
2,000 hp (1,500 kW)
R-2800-59
2,000 hp (1,500 kW) at 2,700 rpm at 2,500 ft (760 m); 2,000 hp (1,500 kW) at 2,500 rpm at 25,000 ft (7,600 m); 2,300 hp (1,700 kW) WEP with water injection. Main production variant used in the P-47 series, fed by an improved C-23 turbosupercharger. Differed from -21 in being fitted with ADI and a General Electric ignition system with a simplified tubular ignition harness developed by the Scintilla company in partnership with Bendix. Used in P-47C and D, XP-47L. Production = 11,391 (P&W 592; Ford 10,799). (Note: R-2800-63 with small manufacturing differences was interchangeable with -21 or -59 . Production =2,092 (P&W 1,262; Ford 767).)
R-2800-59W
2,500 hp (1,900 kW)
R-2800-65
2,000 hp (1,500 kW)
R-2800-65W
2,250 hp (1,680 kW)
R-2800-71
2,000 hp (1,500 kW)
R-2800-75
2,200 hp (1,600 kW)
R-2800-79
2,100 hp (1,600 kW)
Double Wasp 2SB-G
1,850 hp (1,380 kW)

"C" Series:

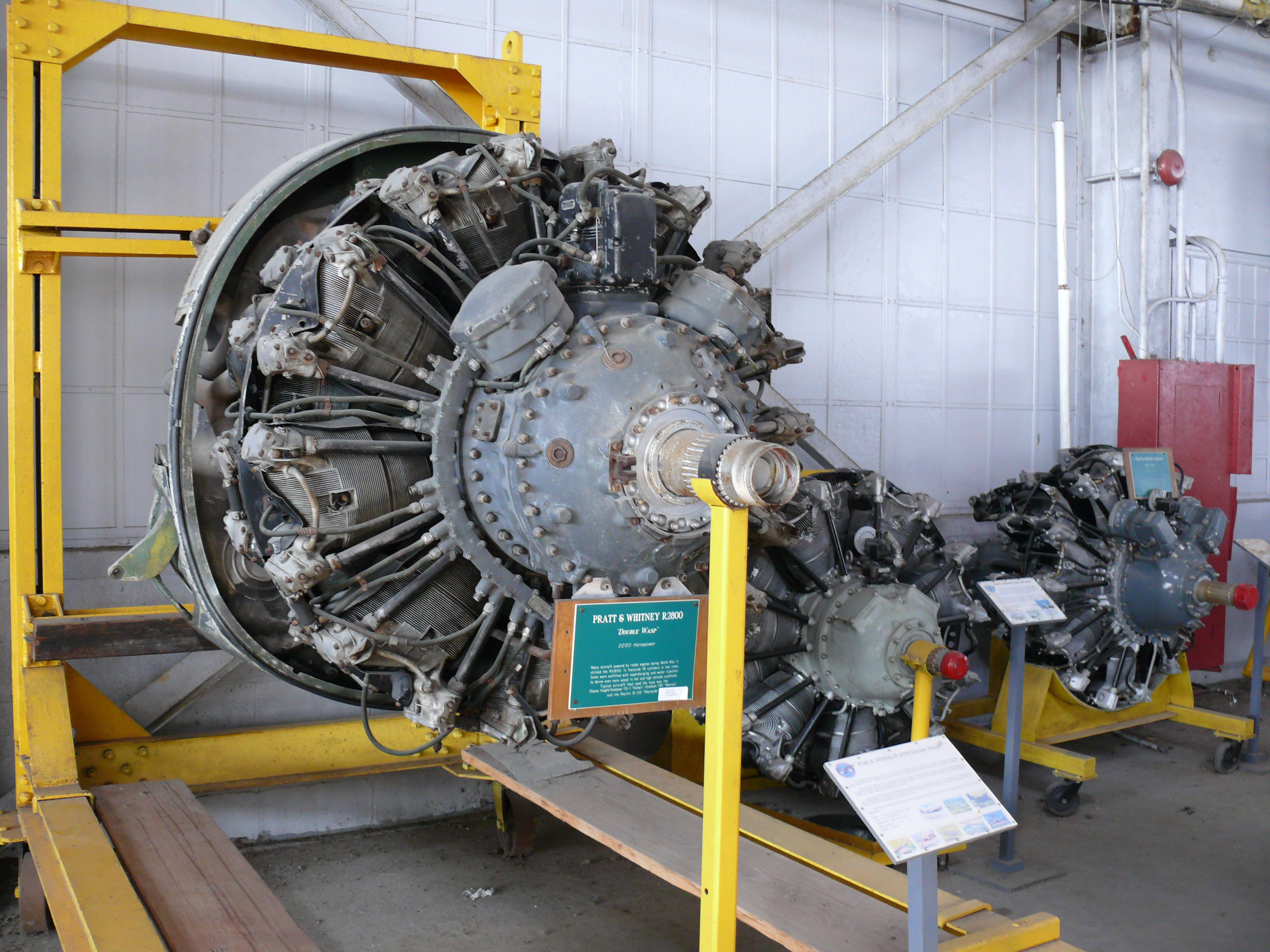
A "C Series" R-2800, with the two-section nose casing incorporating torque-monitoring equipment and a Spark Advance unit, with the "outboard" sparkplug wiring conduit location for each of the twin enclosed distributors.

The "C" series was a complete redesign of the R-2800. Major changes included forged rather than cast cylinders, allowing an increased compression ratio from 6.65:1 to 6.75:1; a redesigned crankshaft; a single-piece, rather than split, crankcase center section; and a two-section nose casing incorporating hydraulically operated torque-monitoring equipment and an automatic vacuum-operated spark-advance unit. The supercharger used fluid coupling for the second stage.

R-2800-18W
2,100 hp (1,600 kW) at 2,800 rpm for takeoff; military ratings included 2,100 hp (1,600 kW) at 2,800 rpm at 1,000 ft (300 m), 1,900 hp (1,400 kW) at 2,800 rpm at 14,000 ft (4,300 m), and 1,800 hp (1,300 kW) at 2,800 rpm at 23,000 ft (7,000 m); used in the F4U-4 Corsair. It used an updraft Bendix-Stromberg PT-13G2-10 carburetor and was fitted to the F4U-4 and variants of the -4. (Note: Because the "C" series engines ran more smoothly than previous R-2800s, the F4U-4 was able to use simplified, solid engine mountings rather than mountings incorporating shock absorbers.) Production was 3,257 by Pratt & Whitney.
R-2800-22W
2,400 hp (1,800 kW)
R-2800-34
2,100 hp (1,600 kW)
R-2800-34W
2,100 hp (1,600 kW), 2,400 hp (1,800 kW) with water-methanol injection
R-2800-44
2,300 hp (1,700 kW)
R-2800-44W
2,400 hp (1,800 kW)
R-2800-48
2,500 hp (1,900 kW)
R-2800-48W
2,400 hp (1,800 kW)
R-2800-52W / -52WA
2,200 hp (1,600 kW) dry; 2,500 hp (1,900 kW) with water injection.
R-2800-54
2,100 hp (1,600 kW)
R-2800-57
2,100 hp (1,600 kW)
R-2800-73
2,100 hp (1,600 kW) at 2,800 rpm standard rating, with war-emergency power rated at 2,800 hp (2,100 kW) at 2,800 rpm from sea level to critical altitude; used in the Northrop P-61C, Northrop F-15A Reporter, and Republic P-47N.
R-2800-77
2,100 hp (1,600 kW)
R-2800-83
2,100 hp (1,600 kW)
R-2800-83AM
2,100 hp (1,600 kW)
R-2800-99W
2,300 hp (1,700 kW)
R-2800-103W
2,500 hp (1,900 kW)
Double Wasp CB16
2,400 hp (1,800 kW), 2,500 hp (1,900 kW)
Double Wasp CB17
2,500 hp (1,900 kW)
Double Wasp S1C3-G
2,100 hp (1,600 kW)

"D" Series:

R-2800-23
2,200 hp (1,600 kW)
R-2800-29
2,000 hp (1,500 kW)

"E" Series:

R-2800-30W
1,720 hp (1,280 kW) normal power at 2,600 rpm, 2,250 hp (1,680 kW) takeoff/military power at 2,800 rpm, and 2,500 hp (1,900 kW) combat power with water injection at 2,800 rpm, all at sea level; fitted with a single-stage variable-speed supercharger for the Grumman F8F-2 Bearcat.
R-2800-32W
Fitted with a two-stage variable-speed supercharger for the Vought F4U-5 Corsair. In the F4U-5 installation, rated at 1,900 hp (1,400 kW) normal power at 2,600 rpm, 2,300 hp (1,700 kW) military power at 2,800 rpm, and 2,675 hp (1,995 kW) combat power with ADI at 2,800 rpm, all at sea level.

(Note: The above list of variants is not exhaustive. A fuller Pratt & Whitney designation index lists additional R-2800 and Double Wasp configurations, including several that were manufactured and others that were not produced.)

== Applications ==
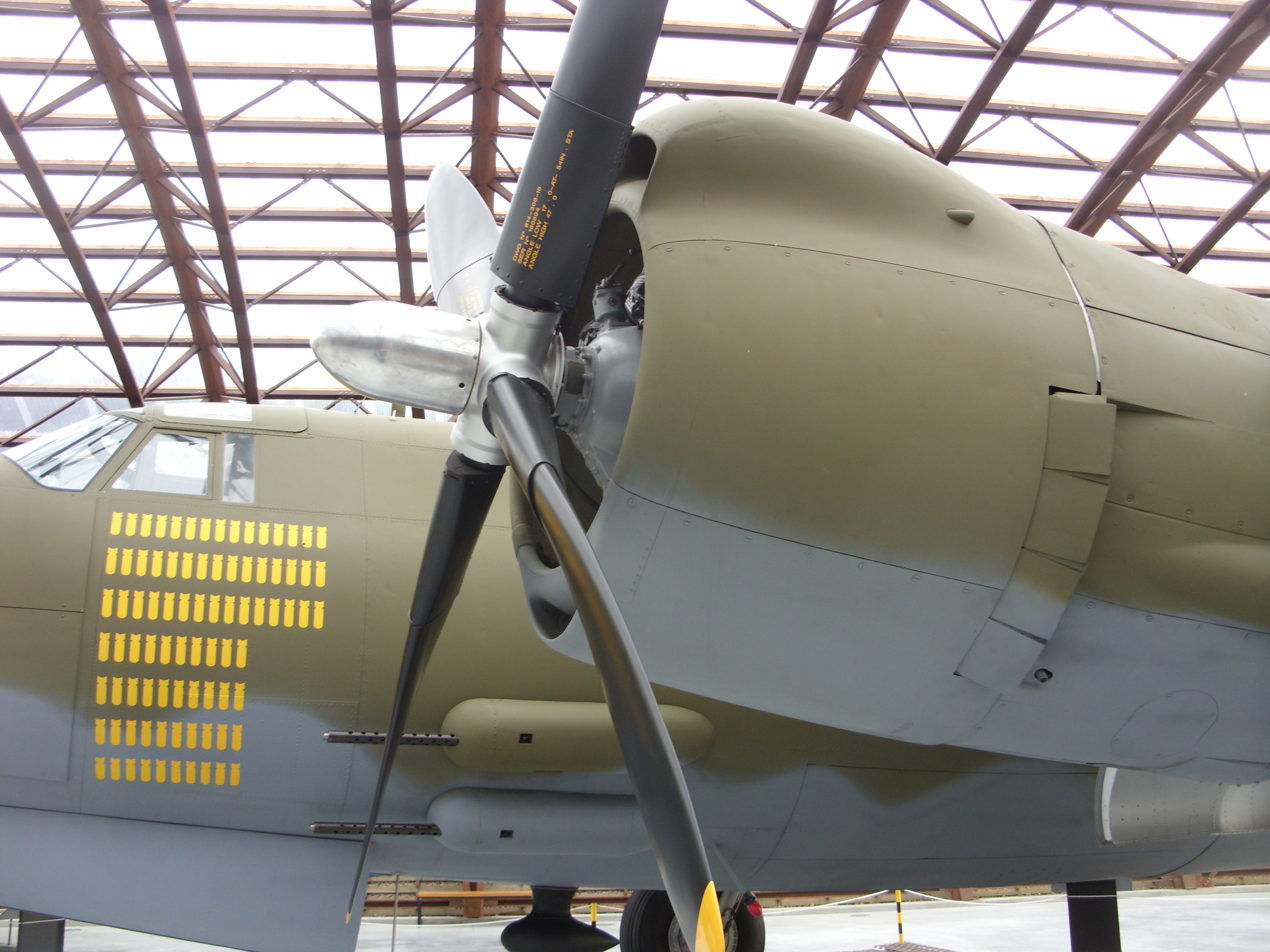
Martin B-26 Marauder

The following is a partial list of aircraft that were powered by the R-2800 (and a few prototypes that utilized it at one point):

- Brewster XA-32
- Breguet Deux-Ponts
- Canadair CL-215
- Canadair C-5 North Star
- Consolidated TBY Sea Wolf
- Convair 240, 340, and 440
- Curtiss P-60
- Curtiss XF15C
- Curtiss C-46 Commando
- Douglas A-26 Invader
- Douglas DC-6
- Fairchild C-82 Packet
- Fairchild C-123 Provider
- Grumman AF Guardian
- Grumman F6F Hellcat
- Grumman F7F Tigercat
- Grumman F8F Bearcat
- Howard 500
- Lockheed Ventura/B-34 Lexington/PV-1 Ventura/PV-2 Harpoon
- Lockheed XC-69E Constellation
- Martin B-26 Marauder
- Martin PBM-5 Mariner
- Martin 2-0-2
- Martin 4-0-4
- North American AJ Savage
- North American XB-28
- Northrop XP-56 Black Bullet
- Northrop P-61 Black Widow
- Northrop F-15 Reporter
- Republic P-47 Thunderbolt
- Sikorsky CH-37 Mojave
- Sikorsky S-60
- Vickers Warwick
- Vought F4U Corsair
- Vultee YA-19B

== Engines on display ==
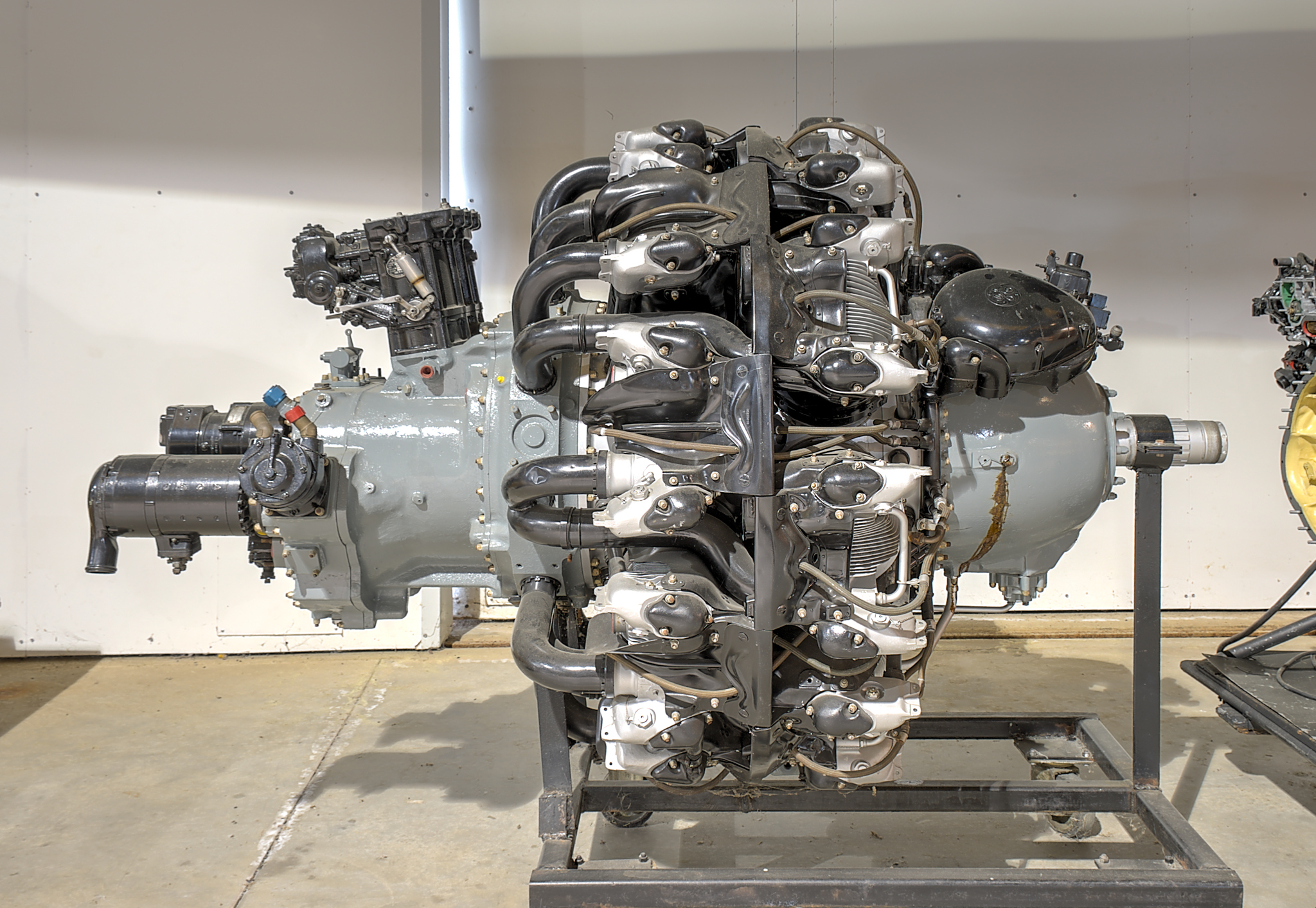
R-2800 on display at Museum of Aviation, Robins AFB

- There is an R-2800-39 on display at the New England Air Museum, Bradley International Airport, Windsor Locks, CT.
- A Pratt & Whitney R-2800 CB16/17 Double Wasp from a Convair 340/440 Metropolitan formerly operated by Aero/Finnair is on display at the Finnish Aviation Museum.
- An R-2800 Double Wasp is on display at Aerospace Discovery at the Florida Air Museum in Lakeland, Florida.
- An R-2800 Double Wasp Cutout is on display at Texas State Technical College in Waco, Texas.
- An R-2800 Double Wasp manufactured by Ford Motor Company is on display at the Yankee Air Museum Belleville, Michigan
- An R-2800-8W Double Wasp is on display at the Flying Leatherneck Aviation Museum at MCAS Miramar, California.
- An R-2800 Double Wasp moving cut-away is on display at the USS Midway Museum at San Diego, California.
- An R-2800 Double Wasp is on display at (The National Museum of WWII Aviation) located in (Colorado Springs, Colorado).
- An R-2800-34 Double Wasp is on public at the Aerospace Museum of California.
- Two R-2800 Double Wasps are displayed alongside a B-25 at the Girua Airport, Popondetta, Oro Province, Papua New Guinea.

== Specifications (R-2800-32W) ==
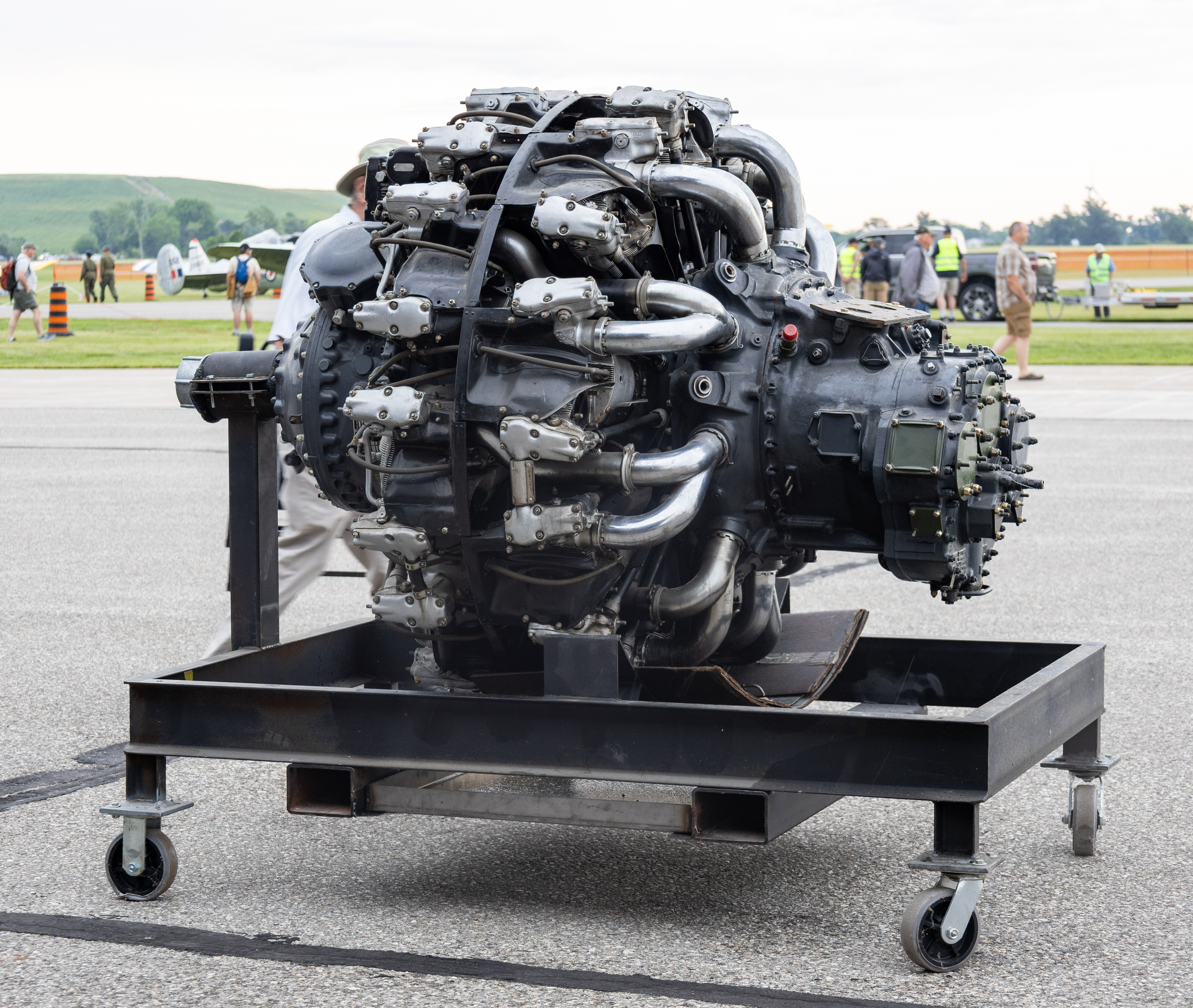
Pratt & Whitney R-2800

Data from Pratt & Whitney designation index and F4U-5 Standard Aircraft Characteristics

=== General characteristics ===
- Type: 18-cylinder air-cooled twin-row supercharged radial engine with anti-detonant injection
- Bore: 5.75 in (146.05 mm)
- Stroke: 6 in (152.4 mm)
- Displacement: 2,804.5 in^{3} (45.96 L)
- Length: 96.50 in (2,451 mm)
- Diameter: 53.00 in (1,346 mm)
- Dry weight: 2,705 lb (1,227 kg)

=== Components ===
- Valvetrain: Poppet, two valves per cylinder
- Supercharger: Two-stage variable-speed centrifugal type supercharger
- Fuel system: One Bendix-Stromberg pressure carburetor
- Fuel type: 115/145 octane gasoline
- Oil system: Dry sump
- Cooling system: Air-cooled

=== Performance ===
- Power output: 1,900 hp (1,417 kW) at 2,600 rpm, normal power at sea level
  2,300 hp (1,715 kW) at 2,800 rpm, takeoff/military power at sea level
  2,675 hp (1,995 kW) at 2,800 rpm, combat power with ADI at sea level
- Specific power: 0.95 hp/in^{3} (43.4 kW/L)
- Compression ratio: 6.75:1
- Power-to-weight ratio: 0.99 hp/lb (1.63 kW/kg)

== See also ==
Related development

- Pratt & Whitney Wasp series
- Pratt & Whitney R-985 Wasp Junior
- Pratt & Whitney R-1340 Wasp
- Pratt & Whitney R-1535 Twin Wasp Junior
- Pratt & Whitney R-1830 Twin Wasp
- Pratt & Whitney R-2000 Twin Wasp
- Pratt & Whitney R-4360 Wasp Major

Comparable engines

- Alfa Romeo 135
- BMW 802
- Bristol Centaurus
- Fiat A.80
- Fiat A.82
- Gnome-Rhône 18L
- Nakajima Homare
- Shvetsov ASh-73
- Wright R-2600 Twin Cyclone

Related lists

- List of aircraft engines
