= Supermarine Speed Spitfire =

Modified Supermarine Spitfire

Speed Spitfire

General information
- Other name(s): Model 323
- Role: Speed record aircraft
- National origin: United Kingdom
- Manufacturer: Supermarine
- Number built: 1
- Registration: N.17
- Serial: K9834

History
- First flight: 11 November 1938
- Retired: 4 June 1946
- Developed from: Supermarine Spitfire

The Speed Spitfire was a Supermarine Spitfire Mk I, re-engined and modified for an attempt on the world air speed record. It was already outdated when it first flew in 1938 and, despite repeated modification, never attained a competitive performance. It was converted for photographic reconnaissance by the RAF, but proved unsuitable and was used as a general "hack" until it was scrapped in 1946.

== Conception ==
In 1937 the idea was raised of attempting a new world landplane speed record with a modified Spitfire. At the time the record of 352 mph (566 km/h) was held by Howard Hughes flying a Hughes H-1 racing aircraft. Although only the prototype K5054 had yet flown, a production Spitfire was expected to be capable of 362 mph (583 km/h) at a height of 16,800 ft (5,100 m). However the speed record had to be flown at an altitude no greater than 245 ft (75 m). The Spitfire was much slower at such a low level; the prototype was only capable of 290 mph (470 km/h) at this height. Consequently, a record-breaking machine would have to be extensively modified. Rolls-Royce began work on a sprint version of the Spitfire's Merlin engine, to run on a special fuel mix.

On 11 November 1937 an appropriately modified Messerschmitt Bf 109 V13, D-IPKY, flown by Herman Wurster, raised the world speed record to 379 mph (610 km/h). It was still believed that a modified Spitfire, with a Merlin delivering a forecast 2,000 horsepower (1,500 kW), stood a good chance of doing better than this, so the Air Ministry decided to go ahead and issued a contract.

== Initial build ==
The 48th production Mk I Spitfire, K9834, was at an early stage of construction and was taken off the production line to be modified for the record attempt. It was designated the Supermarine Type 323,

The engine mountings were strengthened to take the extra torque from the powerful new engine, a longer more streamlined windscreen and sliding canopy replaced the standard type, and the tailwheel was replaced by a lighter skid. Other changes to the airframe included flush rivets externally, and shortened and more rounded wing tips which reduced the span from 36 feet 10 inches (11.23 m) to 33 feet 8 inches (10.26 m).

Internally, the gun mountings were omitted and all military equipment, including the weapons and radio fits, was removed. Their hinged access panels were replaced by fixed ones.

Rolls-Royce abandoned the glycol coolant of the production Merlin and adopted a more efficient pressurised water system. The radiator was made deeper and longer to accommodate the increased engine power. Its underwing well was extended back to the trailing edge, with the inboard section of the starboard (right) flap cut off to make room. An enlarged oil cooler was likewise needed on the other side. The engine drove a fixed-pitch wooden propeller of 10 feet (3.0 m) diameter. This was some 8 inches (200 mm) less than the prototype, in order to try and keep the tip speed down and avoid drag from the creation of transonic shocks. This required an additional, fourth propeller blade.

The finished aircraft weighed some 298 lb (135 kg) more than a standard 1938 vintage Spitfire.

By May 1938 the sprint version of the Merlin II, running on a special racing fuel of leaded petrol with benzol and methanol added, was achieving 2,100 hp (1,565 kW) on the test bench, for short periods.

As with the prototype, following its first flight (see below) all the joints were filled and smoothed, and a gloss paint finish applied. However the Speed Spitfire was given a royal blue livery with silver side flashes. It also retained its manufacturer's test code of N.17, where N was the code for Supermarine.

== Revised requirements ==
In June 1938, still some months before N.17 would be readied for flight, Heinkel He 100 V2 raised the record again to 394.6 mph (635.0 km/h). This was very close to the anticipated maximum speed the as yet unflown Speed Spitfire. Its first flights finally took place at the hands of Mutt Summers on 11 November 1938.

Politically it was necessary that any record attempt should be seen to succeed, so it would not be sanctioned unless the Spitfire showed a clear lead over the current holder. However, during subsequent testing its performance remained marginal, achieving 408 miles per hour (657 km/h) on 24 February 1939. This was not a large enough margin.

It was decided to delete the radiator and some fuel tankage, and change the cooling to a partial-loss system. The upper fuel tank was removed and replaced with a combined condenser and water tank. The water was fed through the engine and back to the tank, where some would be condensed for recirculating, while the overflow was released from the base of the engine as a jet of steam. It was calculated that the Speed Spitfire would be able to make the speed runs and land safely before the water and much reduced fuel would run out at about the same time.

However, before this could be done the World Speed record was broken yet again, this time in quick succession by the Heinkel He 100 V8 (463.9 mph (746.6 km/h)) on 30 March 1939, and Messerschmitt Me 209 V1 (469.22 mph (755.14 km/h)) on 26 April 1939.

There was no possibility of modifying the Spitfire to compete with these speeds, nevertheless work proceeded on the removal of the radiator and fairing over of its duct.

A three-bladed propeller was fitted, and N.17 was taken to Brussels and exhibited in this condition at the July 1939 Second International Aeronautical Exhibition in Brussels.

Following its return the boiling tank was fitted but then, on 30 April 1940, Quill was preparing for takeoff on the modified plane's first flight when the tank split.

A detailed analysis published in that year showed that the engine power at the low altitude required would in any case be inadequate.

== RAF career ==
On the outbreak of War, the Speed Spitfire was still out of commission. The special systems were removed and it was fitted with a standard Merlin XII, three-bladed variable-pitch propeller and standard radiator. Unsuited to fighting, as it had no gun mountings, it was still one of the fastest planes in the world at low level. It was therefore adopted for photographic reconnaissance, given RAF insignia with its original RAF serial of K9834, and fitted with a camera port. It remained in its blue-and-silver livery.

But it still had the reduced fuel tankage. It was flown on an operational mission but proved to have far too short a range to be of any use and the mission failed.

K9834 was then sent to Heston Aircraft Ltd, for further work to bring it up to standard. This included the 'balloon' type cockpit cover and a deeper oil cooler intake. Internally the manual-hydraulic undercarriage retraction was made engine-driven, along with self-sealing fuel tanks and a fireproof bulkhead. Its blue livery was also renewed, although the flashes have been reported as red. The streamlined windscreen introduced excessive distortion and was replaced by a standard PRU type. Photographs of this period also show a tailwheel restored.

However its performance was disappointing. It was subsequently used a liaison craft and "high-speed hack", at one time retained for the personal use of Air Commodore Boothman.

K9834 was finally struck off charge and scrapped on 14 June 1946.

== Specifications (Modified Merlin II) ==
Data from Price 1982, p.91. Specifications are given only where they differ from the early Spitfire Mk I.

General characteristics

- Wingspan: 38 ft 8 in (11.79 m)
- Wing area: 231 sq ft (21.5 m^{2}) gross
- Empty weight: 4,520 lb (2,050 kg)
- Gross weight: 5,490 lb (2,490 kg)
- Fuel capacity: 60 imperial gallons (270 L)
- Powerplant: 1 × Rolls-Royce Merlin II, 2,100 hp (1,600 kW) at sea level. Heavily modified, including water cooling.
- Propellers: 4-bladed Watts, 10 ft (3.0 m) diameter fixed-pitch. Later reduced to 9 feet 9 inches (2.97 m)

Performance

- Maximum speed: 408 mph (657 km/h, 355 kn) at 3,000 feet (910 m). Equivalent to 400 miles per hour (640 km/h) at 200 feet (61 m).
- Wing loading: 23 lb/sq ft (110 kg/m^{2}) fully loaded
