= Supermarine Spitfire prototype K5054 =

Prototype fighter aircraft

K5054
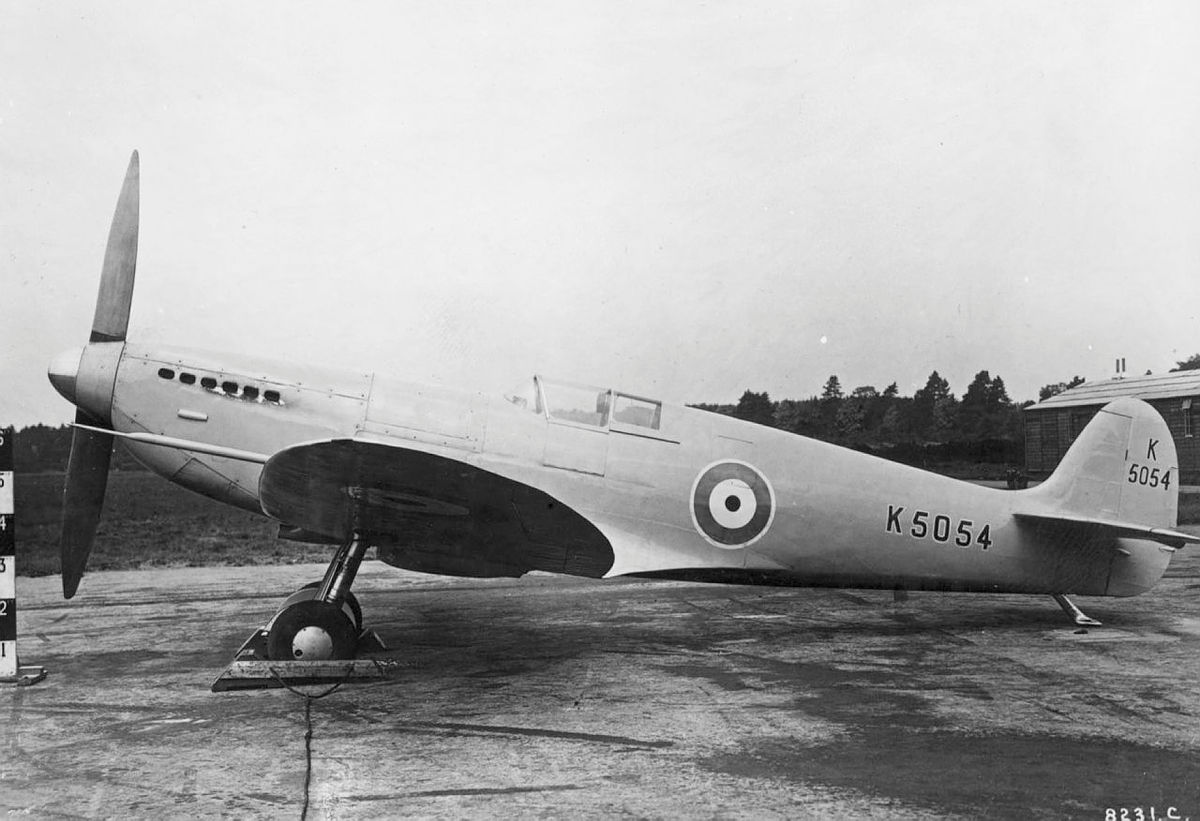

General information
- Type: Supermarine Spitfire
- Manufacturer: Supermarine Aviation Works
- Owners: RAF
- Serial: K5054

History
- First flight: 5 March 1936
- In service: 1936-9
- Last flight: 4 September 1939
- Fate: Crash-landed and written off

The Supermarine Spitfire was developed in the mid-1930s as a short-range, high-performance interceptor aircraft by chief designer R. J. Mitchell.

Only one prototype was made, receiving the military serial K5054. Following its first flight on 5 March 1936, pilot "Mutt" Summers made his famous but oft-misunderstood remark, "I don't want anything touched!" Its appearance and performance caused a significant stir wherever it appeared. The aircraft underwent progressive modifications throughout its life, eventually being converted to near-production standard. It crash-landed several times, finally crashing fatally and being written off just as World War II was breaking out.

Several replicas have been built, including a static one as a memorial to Mitchell. One three-quarter scale replica is flyable.

== Development of the Spitfire ==
Supermarine began development of the Type 300 in 1934, as a private venture following the unsuccessful Type 224 prototype. Chief designer R. J. Mitchell and his team took the Type 224 as their starting point and continued to draw on their experience with the Schneider Trophy seaplanes. The Type 300 was considerably cleaned-up, with progressive refinements including retractable undercarriage, an enclosed cockpit, oxygen-breathing apparatus, and smaller and thinner wings. The distinctive elliptical wing was developed during this phase, enabling it to accommodate the armament and undercarriage in the thinnest possible cross-section, and thus helping the aircraft achieve a high maximum speed. The newly-developed Rolls-Royce PV-XII V-12 engine, soon to become known as the 'Merlin', was adopted from the outset.

In November 1934, Mitchell started detailed design work. On 1 December the Air Ministry issued contract AM 361140/34, providing £10,000 for the construction of a single prototype.

In 1933 Frederick William Hill and his 13 year old daughter Hazel had analysed data from gun firing trials and concluded that eight .303 machine guns would be needed to give sufficient firepower at the predicted high speeds of the new generation of fighters. Following a recommendation by Squadron Leader Ralph Sorley of the Operational Requirements section at the Air Ministry, in April 1935 the Spitfire's armament requirement was changed from two 0.303 in (7.7 mm) Vickers machine guns in each wing to four 0.303 in (7.7 mm) Browning machine guns,. The outer wing section was too thin to fully enclose the additional guns, so small underside blister fairings would be added to production machines to make room for the mechanism. Meanwhile the PV-XII had changed its coolant from water to ethylene glycol, allowing the clumsy evaporative cooling system to be abandoned and replaced by a ducted radiator which had recently been developed by Frederick Meredith at the Royal Aircraft Establishment, Farnborough and actually provided a small amount of jet thrust. By August 1935 both changes had been incorporated into the design.

== Prototype construction ==
Construction on K5054 started in December 1934, although the design continued to evolve during the early stages of build, with the prototype gaining an oval rear fuselage, slightly reduced wing span and rear vision cockpit glazing behind the sliding canopy. Like many prototypes of mass-production designs, the first Type 300 had to be largely hand-built and although its general structure followed that of the proposed production design, its details differed in many ways.

Although the basic wing plan was to stay the same for most production Spitfires, the prototype had integral tips and the alclad skinning was hand-cut to fit the double-curvature of the elliptical wing, the upper skinning being laid out in spanwise strips and the underside in chordwise strips. Similarly, the fuselage and tail was a single integrated assembly, with many small cowling panels to the engine.

Other initial design features which would later be changed included a fixed-pitch propeller, a stubby and partially-recessed engine air intake, a diagonal edge to the rudder tip balance (which matched the edges of the tail plane tip balances) and a tail skid. Underneath the port wing the radiator duct intake ran flush with the starboard undercarriage leg bay, its opening conforming to the angle of the bay. Farther out towards the wingtip a long pitot tube projected from the leading edge.

The Merlin engine was still under development when the airframe was finished. The engine fitted for initial trials was a prototype Merlin C 990 hp (738 kW), with six stub exhaust ports just protruding from each side, driving an Aero-Products "Watts" two-bladed, wooden fixed-pitch propeller.

The prototype was allocated RAF serial number K5054. When first rolled out for ground tests in February 1936, no armament was installed and the undercarriage doors were also missing. Its RAF markings were applied direct onto the unpainted airframe.

Mitchell wanted his Type 300, now named 'Spitfire', to be as fast and sleek as possible. After its first flights (see below), K5054 was given a high-grade paint finish closer to that on a Rolls-Royce car than a typical aeroplane. Workmen experienced on the car applied a coat of filler to cover all the rivets, panel joints and other surface blemishes, and rubbed it down to a smooth finish. They then applied several coats of paint to achieve a high gloss. The colour used has been the subject of debate. It has been variously described as "French Grey", "blue-grey", "pale blue" or "cerulean blue". (Note: Reports on the colour of K5054 include: "This was a shade of blue-grey commonly called "French Grey" and was arrived at by adding blue pigment to a grey enamel base.", "Also the prototype was painted for the first time, with a very smooth light blue-grey finish.", "At this stage the opportunity was taken to paint the aircraft in a pale blue finish, ...", "K5054 at Eastleigh in the cerulean blue finish in which it visited a number of air stations on Empire Day") The laborious finish proved fragile under flight conditions and also added excessively to the aircraft weight. It was later also applied to the Speed Spitfire.

== Career ==
=== Flight testing ===
For its maiden flight the prototype Type 300 was fitted with a fine-pitch propeller to aid in takeoff and the undercarriage locked down for safety. On 5 March 1936, Captain "Mutt" Summers, chief test pilot for Vickers, took it off from Eastleigh Aerodrome (now Southampton Airport). The flight lasted eight minutes. On landing, Summers immediately told the ground crew that, "I don't want anything touched!" This is often misunderstood to mean that the Spitfire was flawless, but in fact Summers just wanted to talk the flight over with Mitchell and the design team before anything, especially the control settings, was altered.

For its next flight K5054 was fitted with a new, coarser-pitch high-speed propeller and its undercarriage unlocked. From now on, the undercarriage would be retracted during flight. Summers made three more flights from 10 March 1936. An updated engine was then fitted and from 24 March Summers left the test-flying to his assistants, Jeffrey Quill and George Pickering. They soon discovered that the Spitfire was a very good aircraft, but not perfect. The rudder was oversensitive, and the top speed was just 330 miles per hour (530 km/h), little faster than Sydney Camm's new Merlin-powered Hurricane.

Ground resonance testing of the aircraft at Farnborough took place in April. Excessive wing flutter was identified and a speed limit of 380 miles per hour (610 km/h) imposed. Returning to Eastleigh, the rudder balance, air intake and engine cowlings were modified, the aircraft given the blue paint scheme described above and the undercarriage doors fitted. These included a second door, hinged off the main one, to close over the outer half of the wheel when in flight.

On 11 May testing resumed. Handling had improved but the maximum speed was still only 335 miles per hour (539 km/h). A new propeller was designed and made, on 15 May taking the top speed to 348 miles per hour (560 km/h), at last visibly outclassing the Hurricane and earning it the reputation as the fastest military aircraft in the world.

=== RAF initial trials ===
The prototype was delivered on 26 May to RAF Martlesham Heath for service evaluation by the Aeroplane & Armament Experimental Establishment (A&AEE). The RAF were so keen to get their hands on it that they broke with tradition and Flight Lieutenant Humphrey Edwardes-Jones took it up again on the same day. The staff were well used to new aircraft arriving, but the Spitfire created exceptional interest and even the cooks came out, still in their white hats, to watch. Edwardes-Jones gave a positive report of the aircraft, asking only that the Spitfire be equipped with an undercarriage position indicator because he had nearly forgotten to lower it for landing.

As the trials continued, the Air Ministry did not wait for the full evaluation and report, but placed its first production order on 3 June. Specification F.16/36, issued to accompany the order, incorporated so many improvements that what was effectively a full new set of design drawings was needed for the production version.

=== Public displays ===
On 16 June the prototype was ferried back to Eastleigh in readiness for a press day two days later, losing oil during the flight. Jeffrey Quill took it up anyway on the day, amid a crowd of press photographers, and the oil pressure dropped to zero while still on his takeoff run. By then committed to the takeoff, he completed a quick circuit and landed uneventfully. An oil pipe had come loose but despite this the engine had performed perfectly throughout.

Following further trials, Edwardes-Jones gave a flying display in K5054, in front of huge crowds at the Hendon RAF display on Saturday 27 June 1936. A couple of days later Summers took it to Hatfield for the SBAC show where it was the star exhibit, giving a display of aerobatics and attracting intense interest from media and industry alike.

=== Continuing development ===
Back again at Martlesham Heath, speed tests proved the troublesome secondary undercarriage doors to be unnecessary and they were removed. A standard set of eight .303" Browning machine-gun armament was fitted with the wings, already designed to accommodate them, being modified accordingly. The engine was also changed for an uprated Merlin F. Trials continued with split peas glued onto the airframe to simulate dome-headed rivets, which were less costly and time-consuming, but also caused greater drag, than flush countersunk ones. The results were used to determine the areas for each type of rivet on the production machines. A radio and aerial were fitted, and the tailskid replaced with a twin tailwheel assembly. This last was quickly replaced by a single tailwheel, due to a tendency to clog with mud.

Following an engine failure due to low oil pressure and consequent wheels-up forced landing at the hands of Sam McKenna on 22 March 1937, a prototype triple ejector exhaust was fitted. Developed for the Merlin by Rolls-Royce, it would become characteristic of all the early production Merlins. Besides a number of other small improvements, the aircraft was repainted in standard RAF camouflage of Dark Earth/Dark Green on the upper surfaces with a silver dope finish underneath. On 19 September, it was found that the new exhausts developed 70 pounds of thrust, equivalent to about 70 hp at 300 mph and pushing the maximum speed up to 360 miles per hour (580 km/h).

Development work continued, especially on the engine exhausts and gun heating system, with the occasional landing mishap, until in July 1938 K5054 was sent back to Farnborough. A planned attempt on the world speed record was shelved and the machine was instead used for continuing development work on the Merlin.

Three days after Hitler's invasion of Poland had marked the start of hostilities and the day after Britain declared war on Germany, on 4 September 1939 an awkward landing at the hands of Flt. Lt. Gilbert Stanbridge "Spinner" White, led to the machine tipping over nose-first onto its back. The fuselage broke up and White suffered fatal neck injuries from the anchor point to the Sutton safety harness, dying the next day. The accident led to the system being redesigned. Parts of the wreck were later used for reconnaissance camera installation trials, but it was never rebuilt.

== Specifications (RAF initial trials) ==
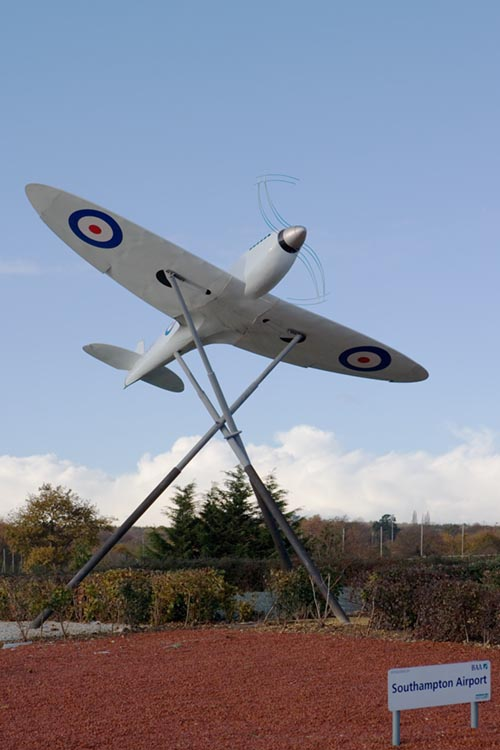
Static model in use as a gate guardian at Southampton Airport, Eastleigh

Data from The First of the Many, Spitfire: Classic Aircraft No. 1

General characteristics

- Crew: 1
- Length: 29 ft 11 in (9.12 m)
- Wingspan: 36 ft 10 in (11.23 m)
- Wing area: 242 sq ft (22.5 m^{2})
- Airfoil: NACA 2200
- Gross weight: 5,322 lb (2,414 kg) with ballast weights in place of guns
- Powerplant: 1 × Rolls-Royce Merlin C V-12 inline piston engine, 1,172 hp (874 kW) at 3,000 rpm at 11,000 feet (3,400 m)
- Propellers: 2-bladed, 11 ft (3.4 m) diameter

Performance

- Maximum speed: 349 mph (562 km/h, 303 kn) at 16,800 feet (5,100 m)
- Service ceiling: 32,000 ft (9,800 m)
- Time to altitude: 15,000 feet (4,600 m) in 5 min 42 sec

== Replicas ==
=== 1942 film replica ===
The First of the Few (also known as Spitfire in the US and Canada) (1942) is a British film produced and directed by Leslie Howard. The aerobatic sequences featured in the last 15 minutes of the film were flown by Jeffrey Quill, an original test pilot on K5054, in early November 1941 flying a Spitfire Mk II mocked up to represent the prototype.

=== R.J. Mitchell memorial, Tangmere ===
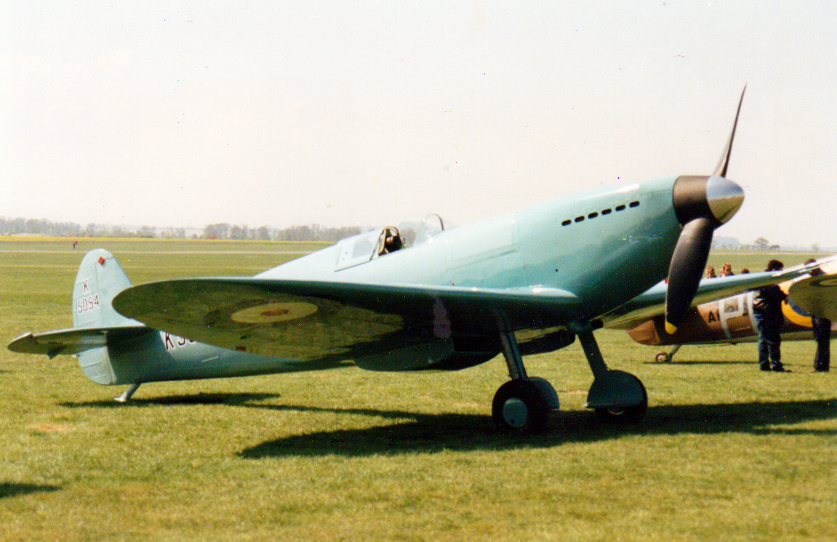
Tangmere replica, seen here on display at Duxford

Former Supermarine test pilot Jeffrey Quill determined in 1983 to build an exact full-scale replica of K5054 for permanent public display as a memorial to its designer, R.J. Mitchell. Together with Mitchell's son Gordon, members of the original Supermarine design team and The Spitfire Society, they commissioned Aerofab Restorations of Andover to create the facsimile. Quill described its accuracy as "99% to the original prototype", although it is non-flying. The overall colour was copied from a desktop model of K5054, believed to have been finished using paint left over from the original machine. Quill unveiled the replica to the public in April 1993 at the RAF Museum, Hendon. Following a period of long-term loan to the Tangmere Military Aviation Museum, the Spitfire Society permanently donated it to the museum in April 2013.

=== G-BRDV Viking Spitfire ===
Clive du Cros built a flying replica Spitfire from wood in 1984. Power was provided by a modified Jaguar V-12 engine delivering 350 horsepower (260 kW) via a 2.77:1 reduction gearbox to its constant-speed propeller. Registered G-BRDV, the replica was painted in the blue-grey livery of K5054. Maximum takeoff weight (MTOW) was 1,134 kg (2,500 lb). Because of its light weight compared to the all-metal original, it tended to float during the landing approach. Following sale to a new owner, it crash-landed during an airworthiness flight test on 22 September 1997 and was extensively damaged, although the pilot was uninjured. The aircraft was deregistered and taken to the Kent Battle of Britain Museum at Hawkinge, where it is currently on static display.

=== Eastleigh sculpture ===
A sub-scale model of K5054 forms the main centrepiece of a Spitfire memorial sculpture on the roundabout at the entrance to Southampton Airport which, as Eastleigh Aerodrome, was the aircraft's initial home. The sculpture was designed in 2003 by Alan Manning and erected by Eastleigh Borough Council. It was unveiled by Mitchell's son, Dr. Gordon Mitchell, in 2004.

=== 19-5054 three-quarter scale flying replica ===
Australian registration 19-5054 is an amateur-built recreational replica of K5054 in its light blue livery. It is built in accurate proportion around a three-quarter scale set of outer wing panels and some fuselage structure from the Australian Supermarine Spitfire Mk 25 homebuild kit. Powered by a 100 horsepower (75,000 W) Rotax engine it has a three-bladed constant speed propeller and retractable undercarriage. Maximum cruise speed is 130 knots (240 km/h). The paint colour is matched to a toy truck in a UK Spitfire Museum, which was finished in paint left over from the original and given to Mitchell's son. (Note: According to Neil Cooper; "R.J. Mitchell gave his son a model truck painted with the same paint as the full size aircraft. We were able to make that paint by contacting the Spitfire museum in the UK, where the toy is held, and getting the colour scanned,")

Built by Chris Weber and originally registered 19-6054, while still incomplete it was sold to Captain Neil Cooper of Virgin Australia. He first flew it at Taree, New South Wales, Australia in 2017.
