= Joseph Summers =

British test pilot (1904–1954)

Joseph "Mutt" Summers
- Born: 10 March 1904; Kingston Upon Hull, England
- Died: 16 March 1954 (aged 50)
- Burial place: Weybridge, England
- Military career
- Allegiance: United Kingdom
- Branch: Royal Air Force
- Service years: 1924–1929
- Nickname: Mutt
- Unit: No. 29 Fighter Squadron
- Awards: CBE

Captain Joseph "Mutt" Summers, CBE (10 March 1904 – 16 March 1954) was chief test pilot at Vickers-Armstrongs and Supermarine.

During his career, Summers flew many first flights on prototype aircraft, (a record of 54 by a test pilot), from the Supermarine Spitfire, to the Vickers Valiant. He also holds the current second place record for 366 general types tested, below Eric "Winkle" Brown's 487.

== Career ==
Summers received his nickname "Mutt" during his early days in the RAF from his habit of urinating before takeoff on the small rear wheel or skid of the aircraft he was testing. This led to his being accused of christening his aircraft like a dog marking its territory. He did this because he was aware that during some crashes a full bladder could prove fatal. Author, Paul Brickhill (in the book, The Dam Busters) referred to the two test pilots Joseph Summers and Jeffrey Quill, as "Mutt" and "Jeff", alluding to the characters in the American comic strip created by Harry Conway "Bud" Fisher.

Summers was granted a short-service commission in the RAF at the age of 21, and learned to fly on Avro 504s and Sopwith Snipes at No. 2 F.T.S. (Flying Training School). He passed out from RAF Digby in 1924 and was posted to No. 29 Fighter Squadron, equipped with Snipes and later with Gloster Grebes.

After six months he was transferred to the single-seater flight at Martlesham Heath, where he helped to test, among other types, the Gloster Gamecock, Bristol Bulldog, Hawker Hornbill and Avro Avenger. He flew for five years at the Royal Aircraft Establishment at Martlesham Heath, including periods on loan to Blackburn Aircraft and Avro. He left his post at Martlesham in May, 1929, and the following month joined Vickers Aviation Ltd, as its chief test pilot. A year later he became chief test pilot to the Supermarine Aviation Works (which had been taken over by Vickers in 1928) and in that capacity flew the first Supermarine Spitfire in 1936.

Summers tested numerous fighters and bombers through the 1930s. He flew the prototype of Barnes Wallis's geodetic aircraft the Vickers Wellesley bomber in June 1935. He was landing this aircraft on 23 July when the port undercarriage collapsed, resulting in several months in the workshops to repair serious damage to the wing.

He flew the prototype Wellington bomber, K4049, with Wallis and Trevor Westbrook (the factory's general manager) aboard, at Brooklands on 15 June 1936.

Through the late 1930s and into the 1940s Summers continued to test numerous aircraft and iron out issues with existing airframes.

=== K5054 prototype Supermarine Spitfire ===
On 5 March 1936 Jeffrey Quill flew Summers in Vickers' Miles Falcon from Martlesham to Eastleigh Aerodrome, where he was to fly the new F.37/34 fighter which had the military serial number K5054.

Summers - then chief test pilot for Vickers (Aviation) Ltd. - took K5054 on its first flight from Eastleigh Aerodrome. After an eight-minute flight, Summers landed the prototype.

K5054 was fitted with a new propeller and Summers flew the aircraft again on 10 March; during this flight the undercarriage was retracted for the first time. After the fourth flight a new engine was fitted, and Summers left the test-flying to his assistants, Jeffrey Quill and George Pickering. They soon discovered that the Spitfire was a very good aircraft, but not perfect. The rudder was over-sensitive and the top speed was just 330 miles per hour (530 km/h), a little faster than Sydney Camm's new Merlin-powered Hawker Hurricane.

A new and better-shaped wooden propeller meant the Spitfire reached 348 miles per hour (560 km/h) in level flight in mid-May, then Summers flew K5054 to RAF Martlesham Heath and handed the aircraft over to Squadron Leader Anderson of the Aeroplane & Armament Experimental Establishment (A&AEE).

=== Second World War ===
Shortly before the Second World War, Summers was succeeded by Jeffrey Quill, his assistant and protégé, who took over testing single-seater prototypes during the war.

During this period of the war, all leading test pilots of the main aircraft manufacturers were ordered by RAF Command to support Groups No. 10, 11, 12 and 13. Most test pilots came from Brooklands where the central manufacture and testing of military aircraft took place. Summers became a supervising RAF fighter tester specifically for No. 11 Group RAF, commanded by Air Vice Marshal Keith Park, during the Battle of Britain. Being a test pilot in this capacity and a former RAF officer, Summers' duty was as a home guard non-combatant position.

During the summer of 1940 Summers was to fly between all No. 11 Group's airfields in south east England to test fighter aircraft and ensure all they were safe to be used by 11 Group pilots after each battle. Any problems were reported to each airfield's maintenance crews. Also pilots were issued requisition tickets for a new aircraft if Summers found an aircraft to be unserviceable.

==== Propeller failures ====
During mid-1940, Jeffrey Quill informed Summers about a problem with propeller fatigue on early versions of the MkI Hurricane and Spitfire. The problem could lead to the propeller detaching itself during flight—something Quill had experienced himself.

Early in the Battle of Britain during an attack over south east England, pilot James Harry "Ginger" Lacey of 501 Squadron from RAF Middle Wallop, complained he had a problem with his Hurricane's engine, and felt it was too dangerous to accelerate any faster than he was.

After Lacey landed the Hurricane, Summers took it up on a five-minute test flight. At 1,500 feet (460 m) Summers noticed a problem with the engine when accelerating to a certain speed. Whilst at full throttle, the propeller sheared off the aircraft. The prop ripped off the cowling and as Summers had no parachute with him it was necessary to glide the plane back to the air field.

==== The Bouncing Bomb ====
In preparation for the Dambusters Raid in May 1943, Summers was test pilot for the experimental bouncing bomb dropped from a Vickers Wellington near Portland, Dorset, a job given to him by close friend Barnes Wallis. He was depicted by Patrick Barr in the 1955 film made of the events.

=== Postwar career ===
Summers flew Britain's first postwar airliner the Vickers VC.1 Viking, adapted from the Wellington bomber, on 22 June 1945. This was followed by the military troop transport the Vickers Valetta, which Summers flew on 30 June 1947 at Brooklands.

The prototype of the turboprop civil transport Vickers Viscount was flown from Wisley Airfield by Summers and Jock Bryce for 10 minutes on 16 July 1948.

The very last prototype to have Summers at the controls on its maiden flight was the Vickers Valiant, once again with Jock Bryce as co-pilot, flown from Wisley Airfield on 18 May 1951.

== Accidents ==
Summers experienced a number of accidents and crashes during his career. During a test flight on the first dual Gloster Grebe, the aircraft spun flat to within 150 feet (46 m) of the ground, coming out completely stalled with full engine. In a full-power dive in the Hawker Hawfinch, a fuselage bay collapsed at about terminal-velocity speed; the anchorage for the Sutton harness was in the tail and this pulled him back and nearly broke his neck. While testing the first Bulldog, Summers spun down from 10,000 to 2,000 feet (3,050 to 610 m), having tried to abandon the machine at 4,000 feet (1,200 m). He had released his harness and was on the centre section when the machine stopped rotating and went into a dive, enabling him to regain control by pushing the stick with his foot. Thereupon he climbed back into the cockpit and landed.

His most dramatic escape was in 1945, when structural failure in a Vickers Warwick caused full rudder to be involuntarily applied at 3,000 feet (910 m) over Weybridge, Surrey. Summers had no alternative but to crash-land the aircraft into an avenue of trees, with a ploughed field at the end. When the aircraft had come to rest, flames emerged from both engine air intakes. Fortunately, some farm labourers had time to get into the fuselage and extricate Summers and his flight engineer before a major fire started.

== Records ==
He was reputedly able to identify issues with an aircraft by listening to the sound it made in flight.

In his career, he clocked up over 5,600 flying hours, which is the equivalent of taking off in an aircraft on 1 January and landing at the end of October. By 1946 he had tested 310 different aircraft.

Summers numbered among his firsts the first flight of a pure jet civil aircraft (the Nene-Viking, a Vickers Viking airframe fitted with Nene jet engines) on 6 April 1948, the first flight of civil turboprop airliner (the Vickers Viscount) on 16 July 1948 and the initial flight of Britain's first four-jet bomber (Vickers Valiant) on 18 May 1951.

By the time he retired, he had achieved 366 general types, second only to the Guinness world record holder Eric "Winkle" Brown who has 487. Summers still holds the world record of 54 "Prototype First Flights".

== Personal life ==
Summers married Dulcie Jeanette Belcher in 1922 in Sculcoates, Yorkshire. He died on 16 March 1954 from complications during colon surgery, six days after his 50th birthday. He was buried in Weybridge Cemetery, Surrey after a ceremony in Westminster Abbey.

== Honours and awards ==
- 9 January 1946 - Commander of the Order of the British Empire to Joseph Summers, Esq., Chief Test Pilot, Vickers Armstrongs Ltd.

== Portrayal in film ==
In the 1955 film, The Dam Busters, Summers was portrayed by the actor Patrick Barr.

== Quotes ==
Don't touch a single thing.

— "Mutt" Summers's comment from the cockpit of the prototype Spitfire K5054 after maiden flight, 6 March 1936.
