= Bendix-Stromberg pressure carburetor =

Aircraft engine part used by the US in WW2

Bendix-Stromberg Pressure Carburetor
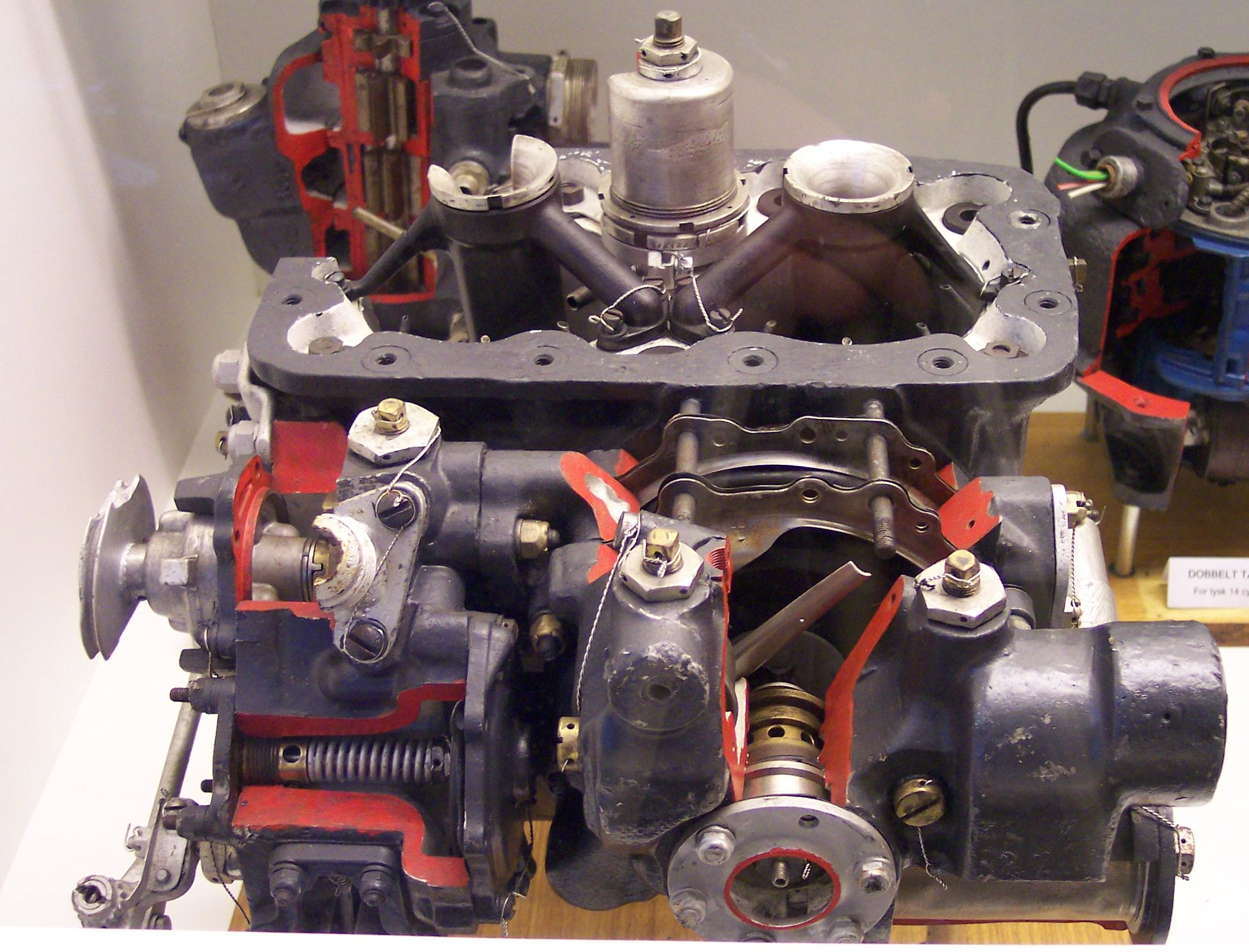
- Cut-away Bendix-Stromberg PD12-F13 from a Pratt & Whitney R-2000 radial engine
- Type: Bendix-Stromberg model PD12-F13
- National origin: United States
- Manufacturer: Bendix

Of the three types of carburetors used on large, high-performance aircraft engines manufactured in the United States during World War II, the Bendix-Stromberg pressure carburetor was the one most commonly found. The other two carburetor types were manufactured by Chandler Groves (later Holley Carburetor Company) and Chandler Evans Control Systems (CECO). Both of these types of carburetors had a relatively large number of internal parts, and in the case of the Holley Carburetor, there were complications in its "variable venturi" design.

A floatless pressure carburetor is a type of aircraft fuel control that provides very accurate fuel delivery, prevents ice from forming in the carburetor and prevents fuel starvation during negative "G" and inverted flight by eliminating the customary float-controlled fuel inlet valve. Unlike the float-type carburetor fuel system that relies on venturi suction to draw fuel into the engine, a pressure carburetor only uses the venturi to measure the mass airflow into the engine and manages the flow of fuel that is continuously under pressure from the fuel pump to the spray nozzle. In 1936, the first Bendix-Stromberg pressure carburetor (a model PD12-B) was installed and flown on an Allison V-1710-7.

== Background ==
The Bendix Corporation marketed three types of aircraft fuel systems under the Bendix-Stromberg name:

The first type was manufactured for low performance aircraft engines and virtually all aircraft engines produced before 1938. These were typically conventional float-type carburetor that were not much different than those found on automobiles or farm tractors of that time, except for size.

After 1938, high performance aircraft engines were equipped with floatless pressure carburetors, especially those used in combat aircraft. The floatless pressure carburetor was the progenitor of today's single-port fuel injection, and was a big step forward in fuel delivery technology. It could be looked upon as the mechanical counterpart of today's electronic fuel control system. These floatless pressure carburetors are the topic of this article.

In the last years of World War II, aircraft engines that exceeded a specific horsepower of greater than 1.0, were equipped first with distributed fuel injection and later with direct injection, which became the fuel system of choice. Using the same principles as the pressure carburetor to measure air flow into the engine, the distributed fuel injection system used individual fuel lines to each cylinder, injecting the fuel at the intake port. The direct-injection systems differed from a pressure carburetor in that the fuel is introduced just up stream from the intake valve in the inlet port in each individual cylinder head in the direct fuel injection system, as opposed to the pressure carburetor where the fuel is introduced at the carburetor. These fuel control devices were individually sized and calibrated to fit almost all piston aircraft engines used by both civil and allied military aircraft made in the post war era. These fuel injection systems are found on high performance general aviation piston engines that continue flying into the 21st century.

== Design and development ==
Starting with the basics of fuel combustion, no matter what type of fuel system is used on a given engine, the carburetor's sole job is to provide exactly the correct amount of fuel into a given amount of air that is entering the engine. To be burnable, the air to fuel ratio must be within the flammability limits of between 9 and 16 pounds (4 and 7 kg) of air to 1 pound (0.5 kg) of fuel (for gasoline engines). Above or below this ratio, the fuel will not burn.

Next, it is also a given that within that range of acceptable mixtures, there is only one ratio that is the ideal air-fuel ratio at that time, given the throttle position set by the pilot. In summary, it can be said that the ideal carburetor provides the correct air-fuel mixture ratio, as required by the engine, under all of its operating conditions.

Lastly, the exact amount of fuel needed changes between the overly-lean lower limit of 16:1 and the overly-rich upper limit of 9:1 as the engine operating condition changes.

To summarize, for a carburetor to deliver the exact amount of fuel required, it is necessary to provide the carburetor with three things:

First, the exact weight of the air flowing through it,
Second, what air-fuel ratio is needed for the engine's operating condition,
Third, what engine operation is sought by the aircraft's pilot.

Once these three things are delivered to the carburetor, a well designed carburetor will provide the engine with the exact, correct, fuel flow at all times. Any well-designed carburetor does this routinely, no matter what type or size engine is used. Aircraft carburetors on the other hand, operate under extraordinary conditions, including violent maneuvers in three dimensions, sometimes all at the same time.

=== The problems: ice, gravity and inertia ===
When fuel is vaporized, it cools the surrounding air due to the refrigeration effect as the fuel absorbs heat when it changes state from a liquid to a gas. This may result in the air dropping below freezing, causing water vapor contained in the air to first change state from a gas to a liquid, which then becomes ice. This ice forms on the throttle plate, which is located "down stream" of the fuel nozzle. The ice also forms on the inner walls of the carburetor, sometimes to such a degree that it blocks airflow to the engine.

Float type carburetors work best when in a stable operating condition. General aviation aircraft operate in a range of conditions not much different from that of an automobile, so a float type carburetor may be all that is needed. Large or fast aircraft are a different matter, especially when considering that fighter aircraft may fly inverted, or through a series of high g turns, climbs and dives, all at a wide range of speeds and altitudes, and in a very short time.

Once the carburetor leaves a stable condition, the float is influenced by both gravity and inertia, resulting in inaccurate fuel metering and a reduction in engine performance as the air-fuel ratio changes, becoming either too lean or too rich for maximum engine performance, and in some cases, stopping the engine.

Float type carburetors are able to compensate for these unstable conditions through various design features, but only within reason. For example, once the float type carburetor is under negative g conditions, such as a rapid nose down attitude, the float lifts toward the top of the fuel bowl as the float becomes weightless when the aircraft descends faster than the float and the fuel. The float is lifted upward by inertia, closing the fuel inlet valve as if the fuel bowl was full of fuel. Cutting off the fuel supply causes the fuel-air ratio to become greater than sixteen to one, which is then too lean for combustion to take place, stopping the engine.

The inverse is also true when the aircraft is in inverted flight. The float becomes submerged as the fuel is pulled downward by gravity to the top of the fuel bowl. The float lifts upward toward the bottom of the inverted fuel bowl. With the float at the bottom of the fuel bowl, the fuel inlet valve opens, as it would when there is not enough fuel in the fuel bowl. With the fuel inlet valve open, the fuel pump continues pumping fuel into the fuel bowl, where the resulting excess fuel causes the fuel-air ratio to become lower than nine to one, which is then too rich for combustion to take place, stopping the engine.

=== The solution: move the fuel nozzle and remove the float ===
Bendix-Stromberg engineers overcame the problems found with float-type carburetors by moving the fuel discharge nozzle to the carburetor adapter or in some cases at the "eye" of the supercharger, both below the throttle plates and by eliminating the float from the fuel metering system. The new "pressure carburetor" design replaced the float-operated fuel inlet valve with a servo-operated poppet-style fuel metering valve.

There are however, either one or two small floats in the fuel regulator air bleed system. These floats have nothing to do with the air-fuel ratio, as their only purpose is to allow any entrained air that may have become trapped in the fuel regulator to return to the fuel tank where it will be vented to the atmosphere.

== Carburetor components ==
The pressure carburetor consists of three major components.

The throttle body is the main component of the carburetor. It contains one or more bores through which all of the air flows into the engine. Each bore contains a number of throttle plates which are used by the pilot to control the air flow into the engine. A venturi is also installed in each bore. The impact tubes are mounted in each venturi, placing them directly in the path of the incoming air. All of the remaining main components are attached to the body, and are interconnected with internal passages or external tubes or hoses.

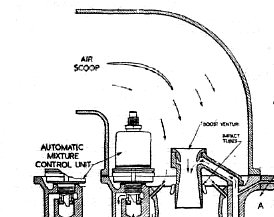
Boost bar with AMC showing impact tubes and boost venturi

The fuel control component is used by the pilot to adjust fuel flow into the engine. It contains a number of jets that control fuel pressures within the fuel control. It has a rotating plate-type valve with either three or four positions: idle-cutoff, which stops all fuel flow, auto lean which is used for normal flight or cruise conditions, auto rich which is used for takeoff, climb and landing operations, and on some carburetors, military which is used for maximum, albeit life shortening, engine performance.

The fuel regulator component takes input signals from various sources to automatically control fuel flow into the engine. It consists of a number of diaphragms sandwiched between metal plates, with the center of the roughly circular diaphragms connected to a common rod, forming four pressure chambers when assembled. The outer end of the rod connects to the fuel metering servo valve that moves away from the throttle body to open, allowing more fuel flow or toward the throttle body to close, reducing the amount of fuel to flow. The rod is moved by the forces measured within the four pressure chambers.

The smaller components of the carburetor are either attached to, are a part of the major portions, or are remotely mounted, depending on the engine application.

The boost component is mounted on the inlet side of the throttle body. It measures air density, barometric pressure, and air flow into the carburetor. It is mounted directly in the air flow at the inlet to the throat. The automatic mixture control, if equipped, is mounted either on the boost portion for throttle bodies with two or more throats, or on the throttle body itself for the single throat models.

The fuel delivery component is either remotely mounted at the "eye" of the engine's supercharger or at the base of the carburetor body. The fuel is sprayed into the air stream as it enters the engine through one or more spring-controlled spray valves. The spray valves open or close as the fuel flow changes, holding a constant fuel delivery pressure.

An accelerator pump is either remotely mounted or mounted on the carburetor body. The accelerator pump is either mechanically connected to the throttle, or it is operated by sensing the manifold pressure change when the throttle is opened. Either way, it injects a measured amount of extra fuel into the air stream to allow smooth engine acceleration.

Military carburetors may have an anti-detonation injection (ADI) system. This consists of a "derichment valve" in the fuel control component, a storage tank for the ADI fluid, a pump, a regulator that provides a specific amount of ADI fluid based on the fuel flow, and a spray nozzle that is mounted in the air stream entering the supercharger.

== Theory of operation ==
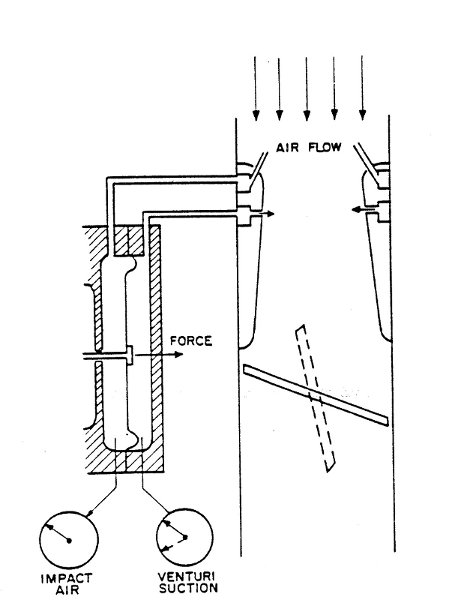
Fuel regulator air diaphragm dividing chambers A and B

There are four chambers in the fuel regulator portion of the carburetor. They are referred to by letters A, B, C, and D, with the A chamber closest to the throttle body. The fuel metering servo valve responds to pressure differentials across the diaphragms separating the chambers. The resulting diaphragm movement controls fuel flow into the engine under all flight conditions.

The diaphragm located closest the carburetor body is the air metering diaphragm. It measures the difference in air pressure taken from two locations within the carburetor. Chambers A and B are on opposite sides of the air metering diaphragm.

The velocity of the air flow entering the carburetor is measured by placing one or more venturi directly in the airflow. The venturi creates a low pressure that changes with the velocity of the air. As the air pressure in chamber A is decreased with greater airflow, the diaphragm is pulled toward the carburetor body. Chamber A also contains a spring that opens the fuel metering valve when the air flow is absent.

The mass of the air entering the carburetor is measured by placing a number of impact tubes directly in the airflow, generating a pressure that represents the air density. The impact tube pressure is connected to "Chamber B" on the side of the air metering diaphragm farthest from the carburetor body. As the air pressure in chamber B is increased, the diaphragm is moved toward the carburetor body.

The difference in pressure between chambers A and B creates what is known as the "air metering force".

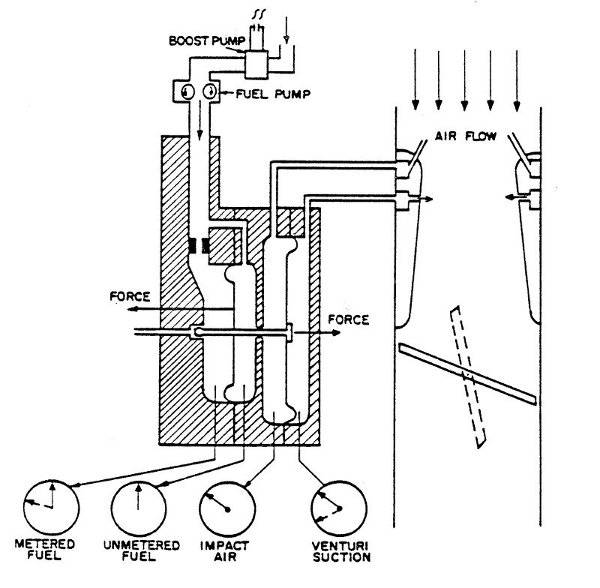
Fuel regulator fuel diaphragm dividing chambers C and D

The second diaphragm is the fuel metering portion of the regulator, and is located farthest from the carburetor body. It measures the difference in fuel pressure taken from two locations within the regulator itself. Chambers C and D are on opposite sides of the fuel metering diaphragm.

Chamber C contains "unmetered fuel", that is the fuel as it enters the carburetor.

Chamber D contains "metered fuel", that is fuel that has already passed through the jets, but not yet injected into the air stream.

The difference in pressure between the two fuel chambers creates the fuel metering force.

The air metering force from chambers A and B is opposed by the fuel metering force from chambers C and D. These two forces combine into movement of the servo valve to adjust the fuel flow to the precise amount required for the needs of the engine, and the needs of the pilot.

== Operation ==
When the engine started, air began flowing through the boost venturi, causing the pressure (referred to as a partial vacuum as it is lower than atmospheric pressure, but not a full vacuum) in the venturi to drop according to Bernoulli's principle. This causes the air pressure in chamber A to drop in proportion with the partial vacuum in the boost venturi.

At the same time, air entering the carburetor compresses the air in the impact tubes, generating a positive pressure in chamber B that is proportional to the density and speed of the air entering the engine. The difference in pressure between chamber A and chamber B creates the air metering force which opens the servo valve allowing the fuel into the fuel regulator.

The pressure of fuel from the fuel pump pushes against the diaphragm in chamber C, moving the servo valve toward the closed position. The fuel also flows to the mixture control valve, which is closed when in the idle-cutoff position and open in all other positions.

Chamber C and chamber D are connected by a fuel passage which contains the fuel metering jets. When the mixture control lever is moved from the idle-cutoff position, fuel starts to flow through the metering jets and into chamber D where it becomes metered fuel.

The discharge valve is spring-loaded to a preset pressure discharge pressure, acting as a variable size restriction to hold a constant pressure in chamber D, despite varying fuel flow rates. The valve is opened as the discharge fuel pressure increases above the force from the spring, thereby lowering the fuel pressure to maintain a balanced position with the spring force.

The fuel mixture is automatically altitude-controlled by the automatic mixture control. It operates by bleeding higher pressure air from chamber B into chamber A as it flows through a tapered needle valve. The needle valve is controlled by an aneroid bellows that senses barometric pressure, causing a leaning of the mixture as altitude increases.

Once airborne and having reached the cruising altitude, the pilot moves the mixture control from auto rich to auto lean. This reduces fuel flow by closing the passageway through the rich jet. The resulting reduction of flow unbalances the fuel metering diaphragm, causing the fuel metering valve to change position, thereby reducing fuel flow to the auto lean flow setting.

In the event of a combat or emergency situation, the mixture control may be moved to the auto rich position, providing extra fuel to the engine, or in military aircraft, into military position, if the aircraft is so equipped. When in the military position, the Anti-Detonation Injection (ADI) system is activated, injecting the ADI fluid into the engine intake system. The pressure in the ADI system moves the derichment diaphragm in the fuel control to close off the derichment jet, reducing the fuel flow to a leaner mixture which produces higher engine power by raising the mean effective pressure. This causes the cylinder head temperature to increase to a very high level, which dramatically increases the risk of detonation (see: engine knocking). Adding the ADI fluid raises the mean octane level of the charge preventing pre-ignition and also lowers the cylinder temperatures to a more acceptable level. As this operation takes the engine well beyond its normal design limits, this power setting is not suitable for prolonged use. Once the ADI fluid is exhausted or if the mixture control valve is moved out of the military position, the fuel control derichment diaphragm pressure is lost, and the derichment jet is opened once again for normal fuel flow.

== Variants ==
Bendix-Stromberg produced a number of pressure carburetor styles and sizes, each of which could be calibrated to a specific engine and airframe.

There are four styles:

- PS single barrel carburetor
- PD double barrel carburetor
- PT triple barrel carburetor
- PR rectangular bore carburetor

Each of these styles is available in a number of sizes, using measurements of the area of the bore on a rectangular bore, or a special system for circular bores, and the actual square inches of the throat area for the rectangular style.

PS style
Single round throat, can be mounted updraft, downdraft and horizontal with slight changes
PS-5, PS-7, PS-9

PD style
Double round throat, can be mounted updraft and downdraft with slight changes
PD-7, PD-9, PD-12, PD-14, PD-16, PD-17, PD-18

PT style
Triple round throat, can be mounted updraft and downdraft with slight changes
PT-13

PR style
Two or four rectangular throats, can be mounted updraft and downdraft with slight changes
PR-38, PR-48, PR-52, PR-53, PR-58, PR-62, PR-64, PR-74, PR-78, PR-88, PR-100

Bendix used a special method to identify round carburetor bores. The first inch of bore diameter is used as the base number one, then each quarter of an inch increase in diameter adds one to the base number.

Examples:

- a 1-1/4 inch bore would be coded as a size number 2 (Base number 1 + 1 for the 1/4 inch over 1 inch)
- a 1-1/2 inch bore would be coded as a size number 3 (Base number 1 + 2 for the two 1/4 inches over 1 inch),

and so on up to a size 18 (Base number 1 + 17 for the seventeen 1/4 inch increments over the 1 inch base).

- Lastly, 3/16 inch is added to the coded size for the actual finished bore diameter.

Using the size number 18 bore as an example, we can calculate the actual bore size as follows:

- The first inch is represented by the base number one, and we subtract that one from the size number, 18. This leaves 17 one-quarter inch units, or 17/4, which reduces to 4-1/4 inches.
- Adding the one inch base number, we now have a 5-1/4 inch bore.
- Last, we add the 3/16 for a grand total of 5-7/16 inch diameter for each of the two bores in the PD-18 carburetor body.

Each carburetor model number includes the style, size and a specific model letter, which may be followed by a revision number. Each application (the specific engine and airframe combination) then receives a "list number" that contains a list of the specific parts and flow sheet for that application. Needless to say, there are hundreds of parts list and flow sheets in the master catalog.

== Applications ==
Generally, the PS style carburetors are used on opposed piston engines found on light aircraft and helicopters. The engine can be mounted in the nose, tail, wing or mounted internally on the airframe. The engine can be mounted vertically as well as horizontally.

PD style carburetors are for inline and radial engines from 900 to 1900 cubic inches.

PT style carburetors are usually found on 1700 to 2600 cubic inch engines

PR style carburetors are used on 2600 to 4360 cubic inch engines
