= Twin Wasp =

Twin Wasp may refer to one of three engines of the Pratt & Whitney Wasp series:

- Pratt & Whitney R-1830 Twin Wasp
- Pratt & Whitney R-1535 Twin Wasp Junior
- Pratt & Whitney R-2180-E Twin Wasp E

== See also ==
- Pratt & Whitney R-2180-A Twin Hornet
