= Pratt & Whitney R-2180 =

Pratt & Whitney R-2180 was the designation for two closely related radial engines developed in the United States by Pratt & Whitney. They had two rows of seven cylinders each.

- Pratt & Whitney R-2180-A Twin Hornet - first run in 1936
- Pratt & Whitney R-2180-E Twin Wasp E - first run in 1945
