= Pratt & Whitney Wasp series =

Family of aircraft engines

Wasp series
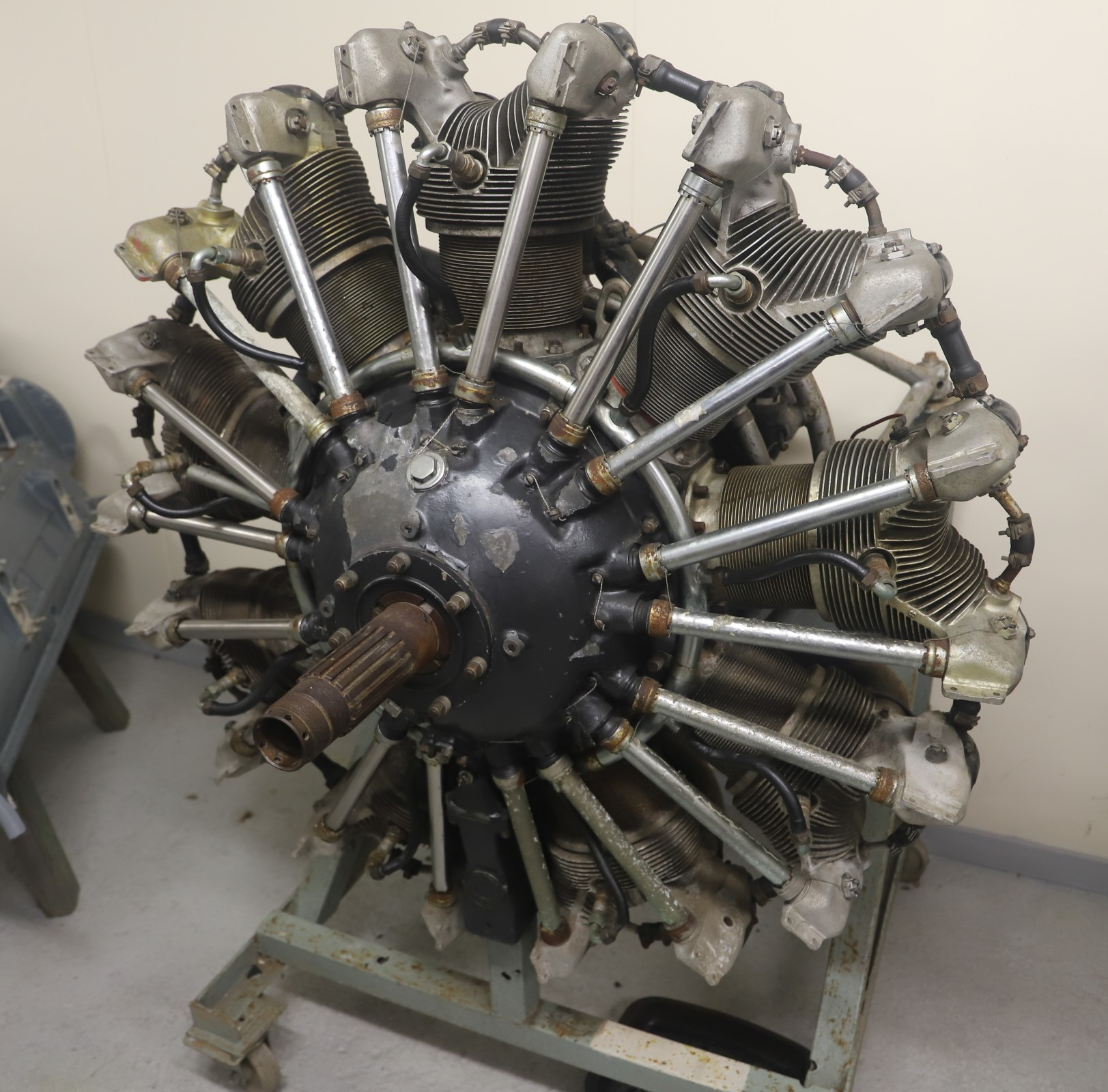
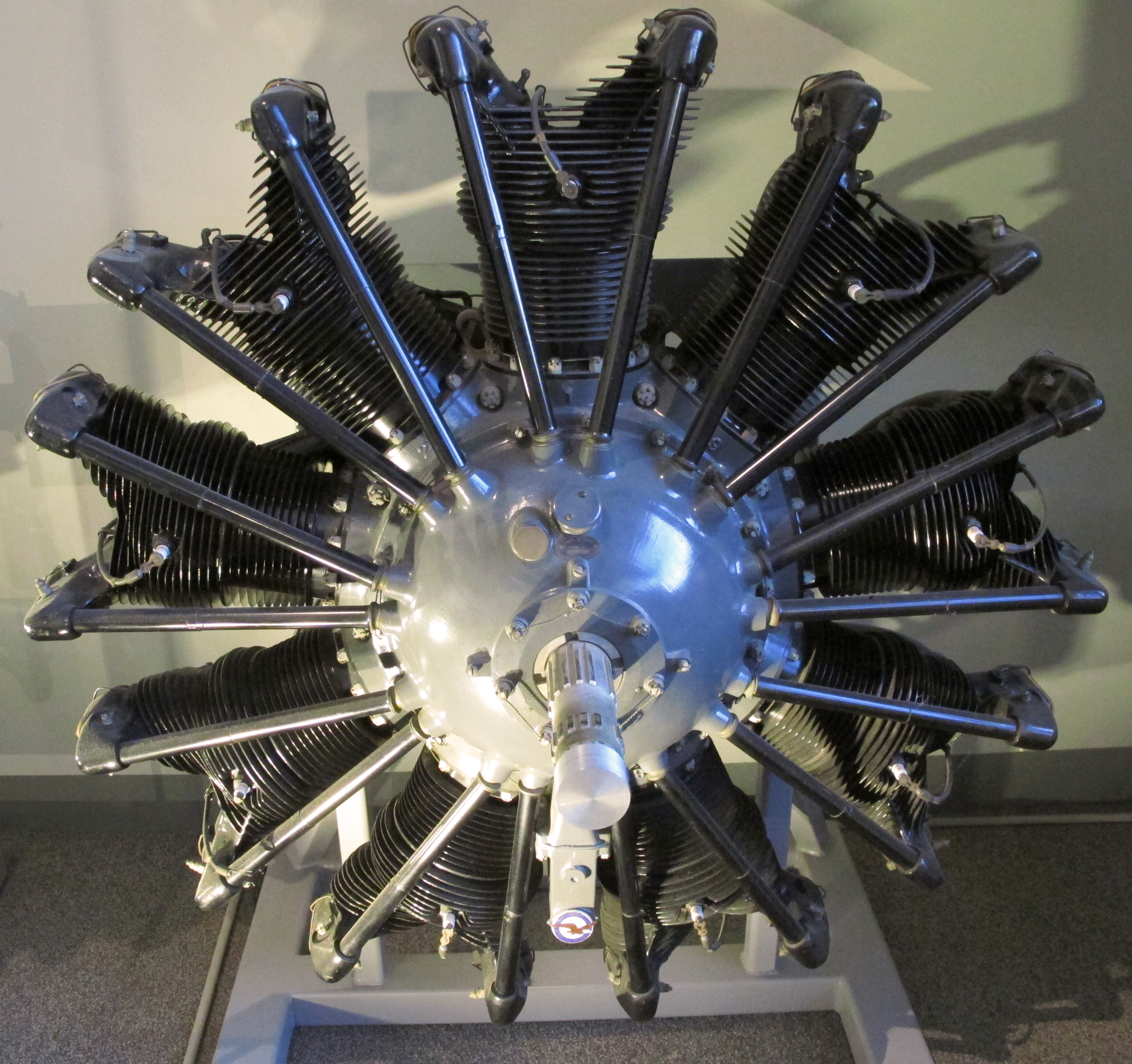
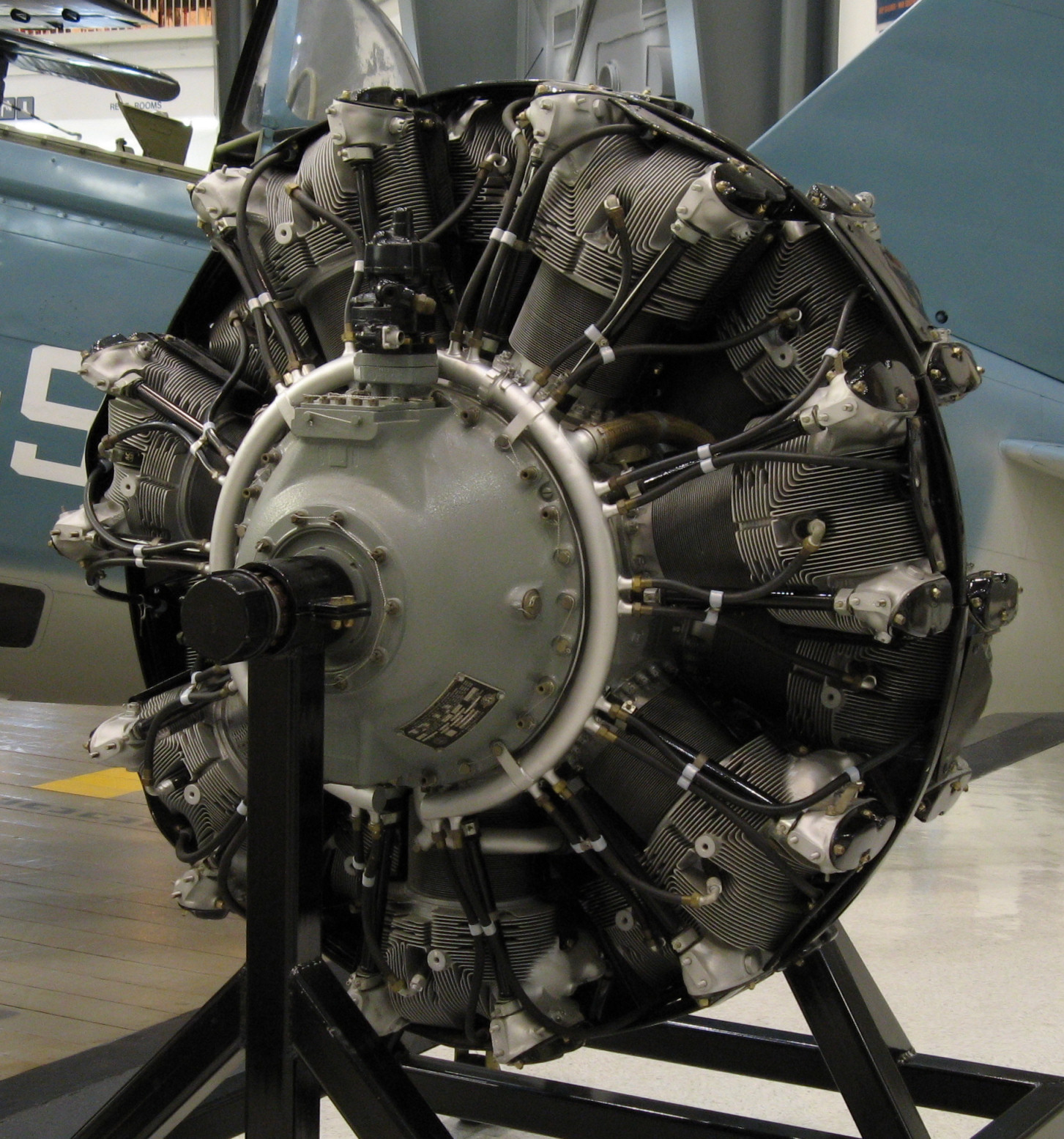
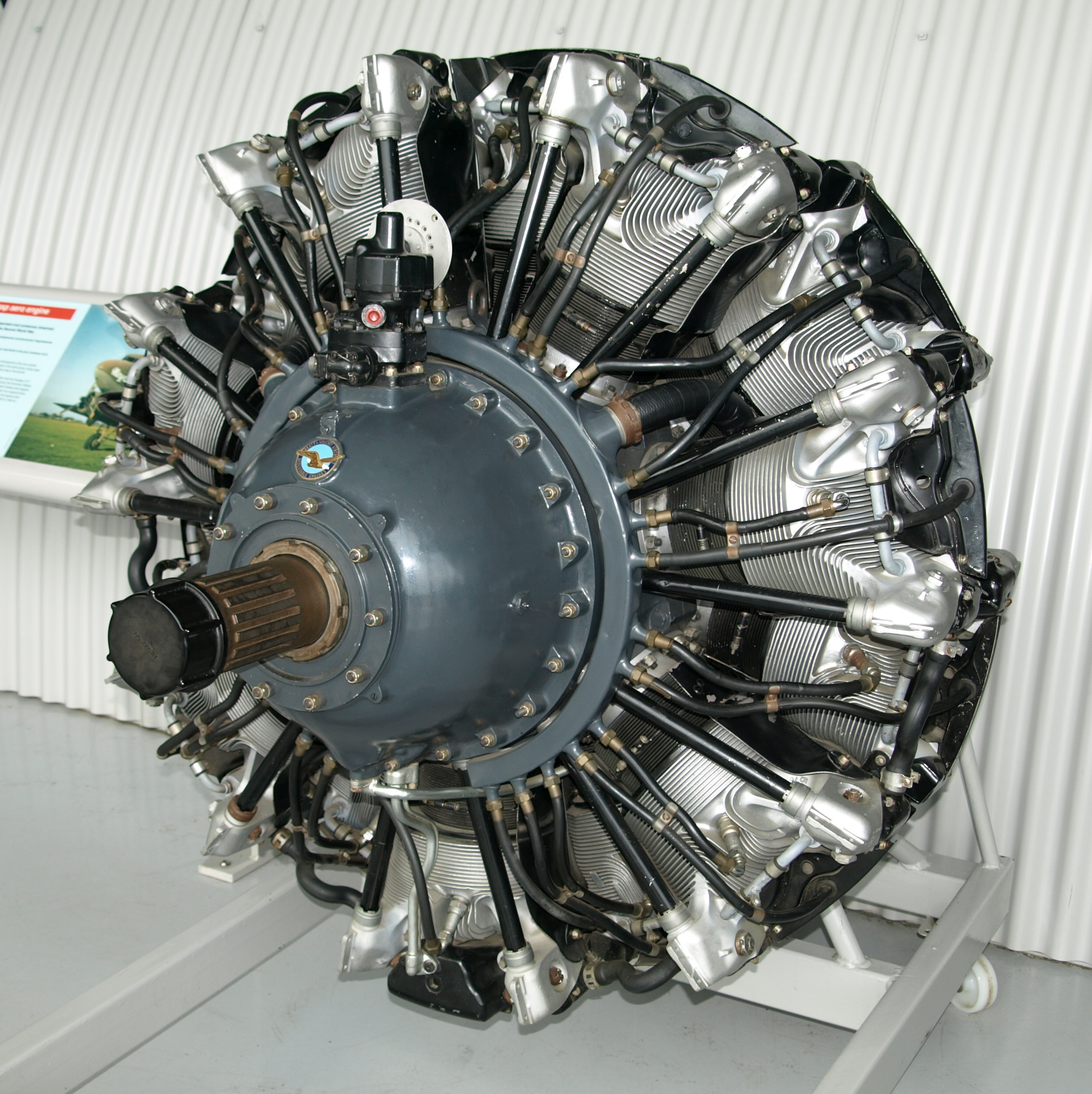
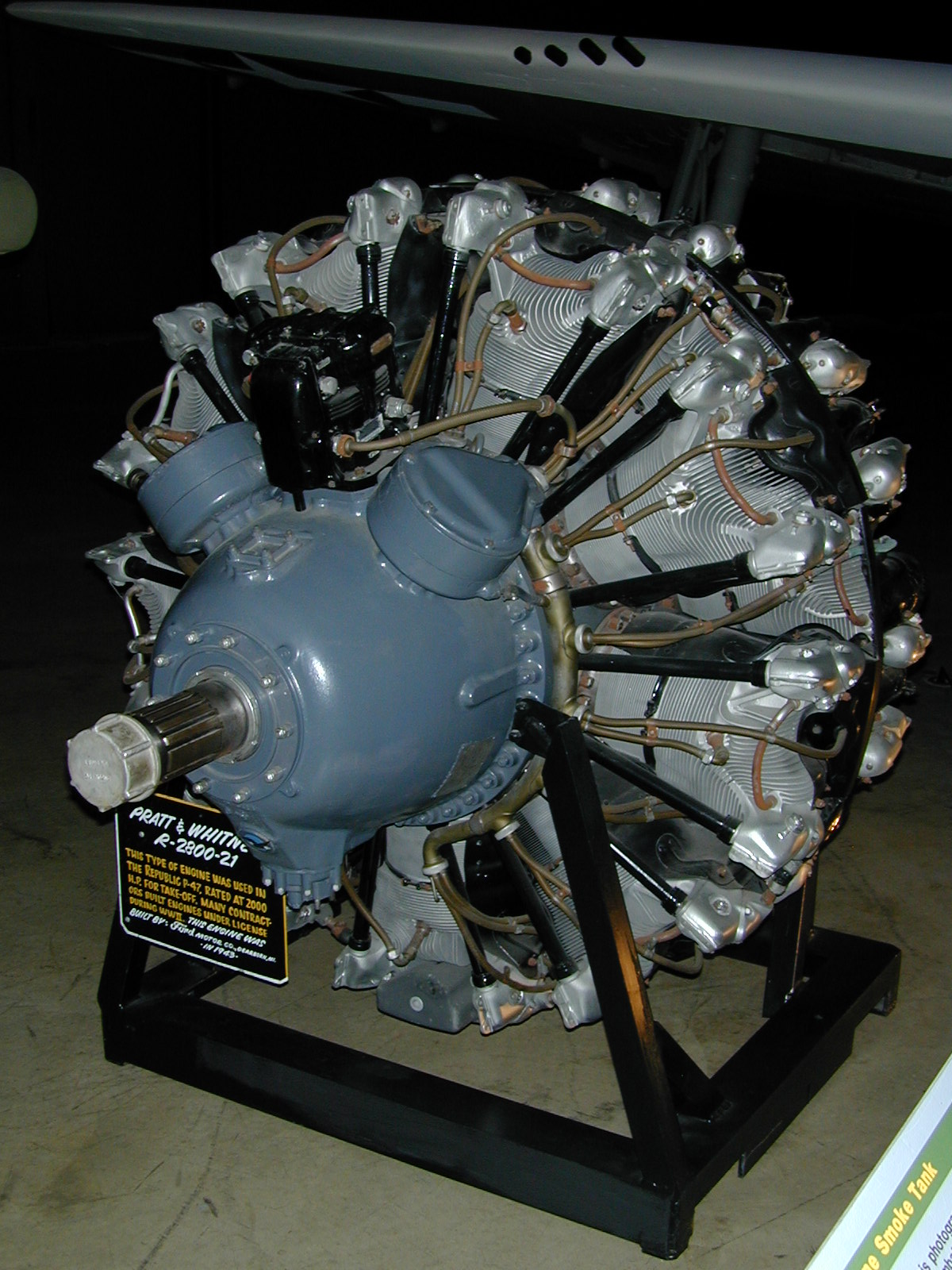
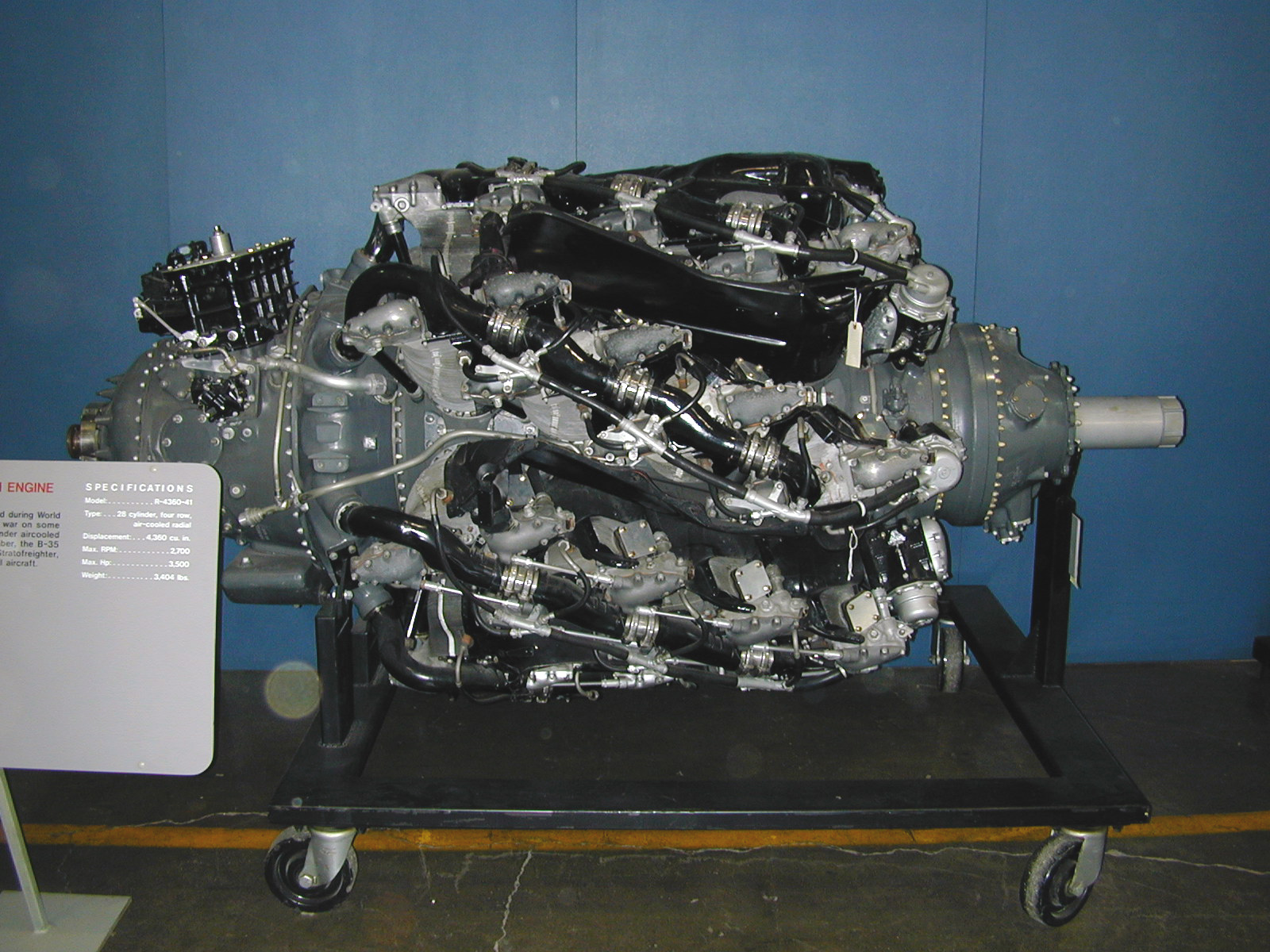
- R-985, R-1340, R-1535, R-1830, R-2800 and R-4360
- Type: Radial engine
- National origin: United States
- Manufacturer: Pratt & Whitney
- Manufactured: 1926–1960
- Number built: 407,724

The Pratt & Whitney Wasp was the civilian name of a family of air-cooled, radial piston engines developed in the 1920s, 1930s, and 1940s.

The Pratt & Whitney Aircraft Company (P&W) was founded in 1925 by Frederick B. Rentschler, who had previously been the president of Wright Aeronautical. He brought with him some of Wright's best designers, and the new team quickly came up with their first design, the R-1340 Wasp. The name "Wasp" was suggested for the first model by Rentschler's wife, Faye.

== Wasp series ==
R-985 Wasp Junior (1930)

- Nine-cylinder, single-row, air-cooled radial
- Bore x stroke: 5 3/16 in × 5 3/16 in (132 mm × 132 mm)
- Displacement: 985 cu in (16.14 L)

R-1340 Wasp (1925)

- Nine-cylinder, single-row, air-cooled radial
- Bore x stroke: 5 3/4 in × 5 3/4 in (146 mm × 146 mm)
- Displacement: 1,344 cu in (22.02 L)

R-1535 Twin Wasp Junior (1931)

- 14-cylinder, two-row, air-cooled radial
- Bore x stroke: 5 3/16 in × 5 3/16 in (132 mm × 132 mm)
- Displacement: 1,535 cu in (25.15 L)
- Power output: 700–950 hp (520–710 kW)

R-1830 Twin Wasp (1931)

- 14-cylinder, two-row, air-cooled radial
- Bore x stroke: 5 1/2 in × 5 1/2 in (140 mm × 140 mm)
- Displacement: 1,830 cu in (30.0 L)
- Power output: 750–1,350 hp (560–1,010 kW)

R-2000 Twin Wasp

- 14-cylinder, two-row, air-cooled radial
- Bore x stroke: 5 3/4 in × 5 1/2 in (146 mm × 140 mm)
- Displacement: 2,000 cu in (33 L)
- Power output: 1,300–1,450 hp (970–1,080 kW)

R-2180-E Twin Wasp E

- 14-cylinder, two-row, air-cooled radial
- Bore x stroke: 5 3/4 in × 6 in (146 mm × 152 mm)
- Displacement: 2,180 cu in (35.7 L)
- Power output: 1,800 hp (1,300 kW)

R-2800 Double Wasp (1940)

- 18-cylinder, two-row, air-cooled radial
- Bore x stroke: 5 3/4 in × 6 in (146 mm × 152 mm)
- Displacement: 2,804 cu in (45.95 L)
- Power output: 1,800–2,500 hp (1,300–1,900 kW) (2,800 hp (2,100 kW) with ADI)

R-4360 Wasp Major (1942)

- 28-cylinder, four-row, air-cooled radial
- Bore x stroke: 5 3/4 in × 6 in (146 mm × 152 mm)
- Displacement: 4,363 cu in (71.50 L)

Note: the designations refer to the engine configurations as follows: "R" = Radial, followed by the approximate displacement in cubic inches.

== See also ==
Related development

- Pratt & Whitney R-1690 Hornet
- Pratt & Whitney R-2180-A Twin Hornet

Comparable engines

- Wright Cyclone series

Related lists

- List of aircraft engines
