= North American NA-116 =

NA-116

General information
- Type: Heavy bomber
- National origin: United States
- Status: Cancelled before built
- Number built: 0

North American NA-116 was a WWII proposal for a four-engined twin-boom heavy bomber.

== Specifications ==
Data from

- Crew: 12 (two pilots, a navigator (also doubling as the bombardier), a radio operator and no fewer than eight machine gunners)
- Length: 85.8 ft (26.2 m)
- Wingspan: 154 ft (47 m)
- Gross weight: 80,000–132,000 lb (36,287–59,874 kg)
- Powerplant: 4 × Pratt & Whitney XR-4360-SSG21-5, 3,450 hp (2,570 kW) each
- Performance
  - Range: 5,000 mi (8,000 km, 4,300 nmi) (Fully loaded and fully fueled)
- Armament
  - 4 x 0.50 caliber heavy machine guns (Nose gunner), 2 x 0.50 cal HMGs installed side-by-side (Dorsal Turret), each dorsal boom turret was outfitted with 2 x 0.50 caliber HMGs 2 x 20mm autocannons positioned at the end of the fuselage in a trainable mounting 2 x 20mm autocannons (Tail boom gun positions)
    - This equaled 10 x 0.50 caliber HMGs (though as many as 14 may have been carried before the end) and 6 x 20mm autocannons.
  - Internal bomb load of up to 34,000 lb of drop stores
