= Pratt & Whitney R-2270 =

1930 14-cylinder radial piston engine by Pratt & Whitney

R-2270
- Type: Radial engine
- National origin: United States
- Manufacturer: Pratt & Whitney
- First run: 1930
- Number built: 1

The Pratt & Whitney R-2270 was an American 14-cylinder air-cooled radial aircraft engine. Displacing 2,270 cu in (37.2 L), it was Pratt & Whitney's first two-row radial engine, developed using parts from existing Wasp and Hornet engines to produce an experimental engine. Design of the engine was begun in January 1929; it first ran on May 14, 1930, and in April 1931 was test-flown in a Boeing Model 40B aircraft. The R-2270 was intended as a purely experimental engine; studies indicated a smaller engine would be more favored by the market, and Pratt & Whitney began development of the R-1830 engine in April 1931.

== Applications ==
- Boeing Model 40 (testbed)

== See also ==
Related development

- Pratt & Whitney R-1340 Wasp
- Pratt & Whitney R-1690 Hornet

Related lists

- List of aircraft engines
