= Boeing XF8B =

Prototype fighter aircraft

XF8B
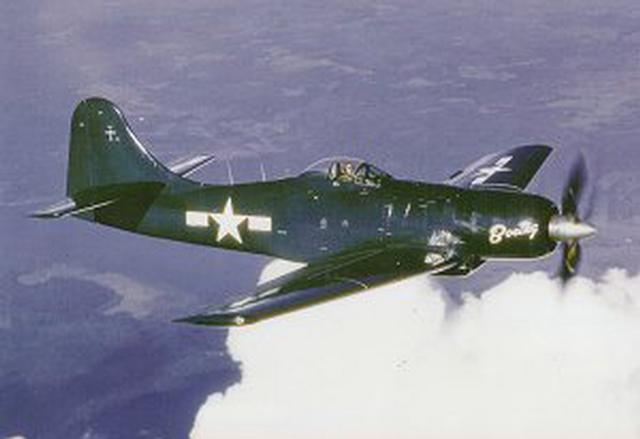
- XF8B-1 BuNo 57986 wearing overall Glossy Sea Blue livery, photographed 12 December 1946

General information
- Type: Fighter
- Manufacturer: Boeing
- Status: Canceled
- Primary users: United States Navy United States Army Air Forces
- Number built: 3

History
- First flight: 27 November 1944

The Boeing XF8B (Model 400) was a single-engine aircraft developed by Boeing during World War II to provide the United States Navy with a long-range shipboard fighter aircraft. The XF8B was intended for operation against the Japanese home islands from aircraft carriers outside the range of Japanese land-based aircraft. Designed for various roles including interceptor, long-range escort fighter, dive-bomber, and torpedo bomber, the final design embodied a number of innovative features in order to accomplish the various roles. Despite its formidable capabilities, the XF8B-1 never entered series production.

== Design and development ==
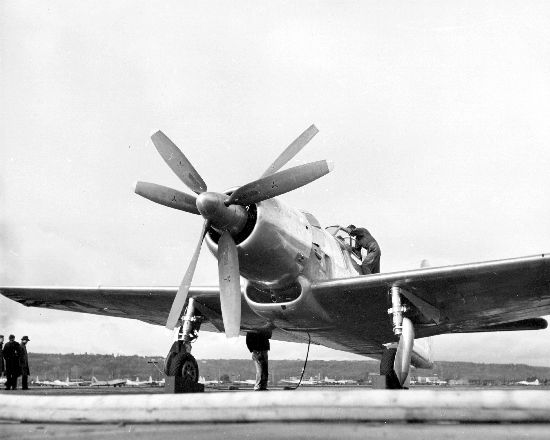
XF8B-1 illustrating the contra-rotating propellers

The XF8B-1 was, at the time, the largest and heaviest single-seat, single-engine fighter developed in the United States. Boeing called the XF8B-1 optimistically, the "five-in-one fighter" (fighter, interceptor, dive bomber, torpedo bomber, and level bomber). It was powered by a single 3,000 hp (2,200 kW) Pratt & Whitney XR-4360-10 four-row 28-cylinder radial engine, driving two three-bladed contra-rotating propellers. It would be the largest single-seat piston fighter to fly in the U.S. to date. The large wings featured outer sections which could fold vertically, while the fuselage incorporated an internal bomb bay and large fuel tanks; more fuel could be carried externally. The proposed armament included six 0.50 inch (12.7 mm) machine guns or six 20 mm wing-mounted cannons, and a 6,400 lb (2,900 kg) bomb load or two 2,000 lb (900 kg) torpedoes. The final configuration was a large but streamlined design, featuring a bubble canopy, sturdy main undercarriage that folded into the wings, and topped by a variation on the B-29 vertical tail.

The contract for three prototypes (BuNos 57984–57986) was awarded 4 May 1943, although only one was completed before the war ended. It first flew in November 1944. The two remaining prototypes were completed after the war, with the third (BuNo 57986) evaluated at Eglin Air Force Base by the United States Army Air Forces.

== Operational history ==
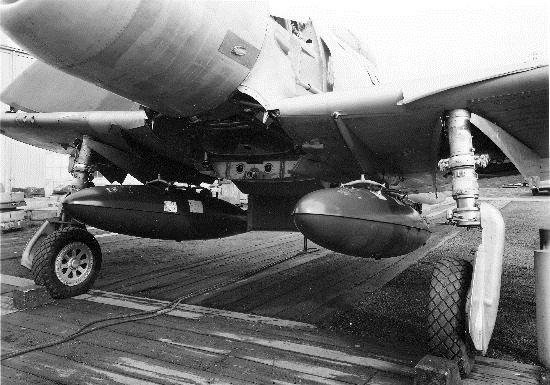
Drop tank arrangement on XF8B-1

To expedite testing and evaluation, a tandem seat was fitted to the first two prototypes to allow a flight engineer to help monitor the test flights. The second seat was easily accommodated in the roomy cockpit.

Although testing of the promising XF8B concept continued into 1946 by the USAAF and 1947 by the US Navy, the end of the war in the Pacific and changing postwar strategy required that Boeing concentrate on building large land-based bombers and transports. The advent of jet fighters led to the cancellation of many wartime piston-engined projects; consequently, since the USAF lost interest in pursuing the project and the U.S. Navy was only prepared to offer a small contract, Boeing chose to wind down the XF8B program. Tests at Boeing Field were marred by an accident in which a test pilot accidentally retracted his landing gear on final approach. Investigation later found this to have been caused by a faulty micro switch. This occurred just as first shift was ending, and as many workers watched from the Plant 2 steps, the XF8B-1 bellied onto the concrete of Boeing Field. As the test program was concluded, the prototypes were scrapped one by one, with 57986 lingering on into 1950.

== Operators ==
United States

- United States Army Air Forces
- United States Navy

== Specifications (Boeing XF8B-1) ==
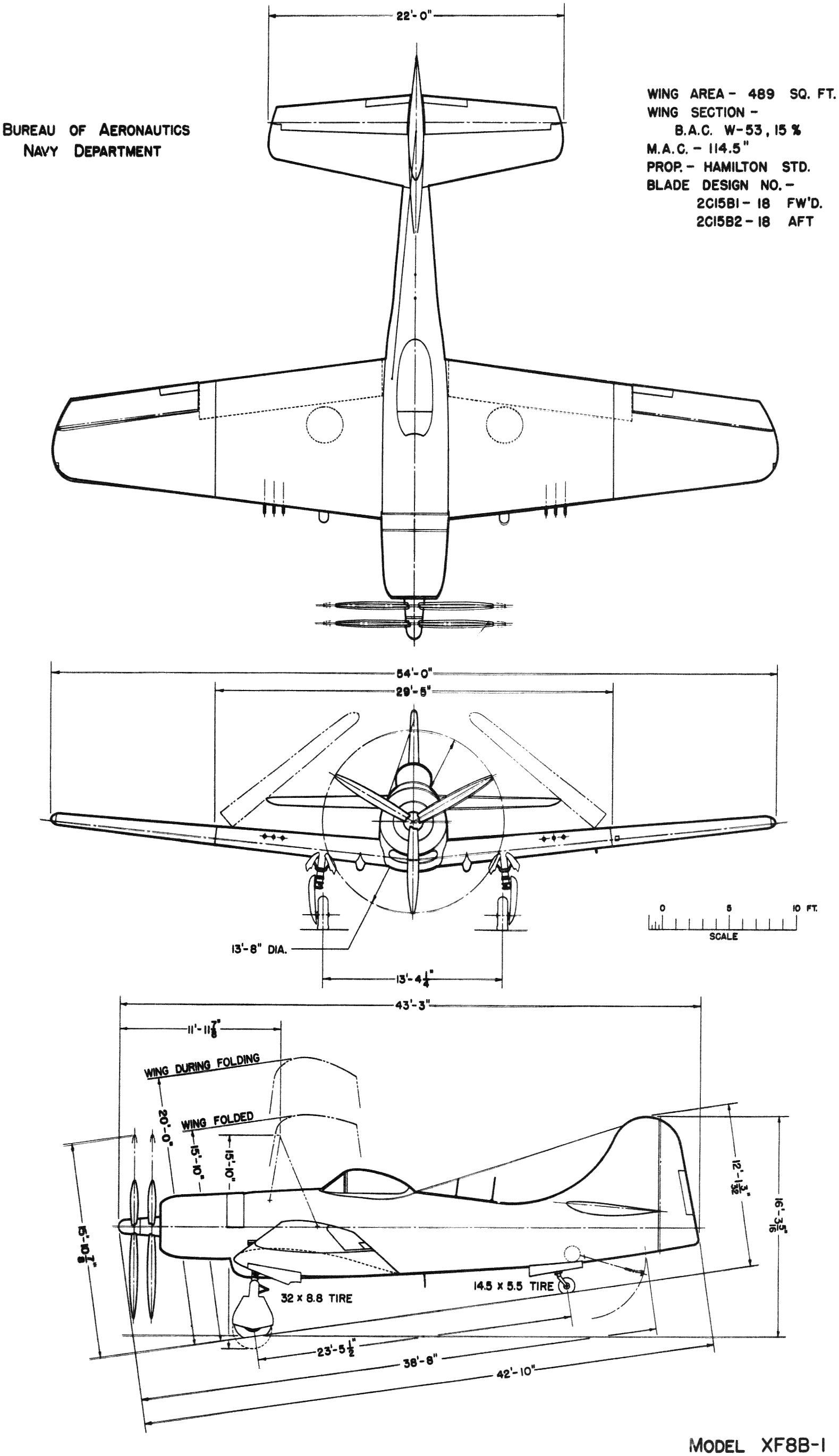
3-view line drawing of the Boeing XF8B-1

Data from Jane's all the World's Aircraft 1947, Boeing XF8B-1 "Five-in-one" fighter., Last of the Line: Boeing's XF8B-1 Multi-purpose Fighter

General characteristics

- Crew: 1
- Length: 43 ft 3 in (13.18 m)
- Wingspan: 54 ft (16 m)
- Height: 16 ft 3 in (4.95 m)
- Wing area: 489 sq ft (45.4 m^{2})
- Empty weight: 13,519 lb (6,132 kg)
- Gross weight: 20,508 lb (9,302 kg)
- Max takeoff weight: 21,691 lb (9,839 kg)
- Powerplant: 1 × Pratt & Whitney XR-4360-10 28 cylinder air-cooled piston engine, 3,000 hp (2,200 kW) for take-off; (3,600 hp (2,700 kW) war emergency with water injection)
- Propellers: 3-bladed 2 × Aeroprop, 13 ft 6 in (4.11 m) diameter contra-rotating co-axial propellers

Performance

- Maximum speed: 450 mph (720 km/h, 390 kn) + (with war emergency power and water injection)
- Cruise speed: 190 mph (310 km/h, 170 kn)
- Range: 2,800 mi (4,500 km, 2,400 nmi)
- Service ceiling: 37,500 ft (11,400 m)
- Rate of climb: 2,000 ft/min (10 m/s)
- Power/mass: 0.15 hp/lb (0.240 kW/kg)

Armament

- Guns: 6 × 20 mm (0.787 in) cannon or 6 × 0.5 in (12.7 mm) machine guns
- Rockets: provision for rockets under the outer wings
- Bombs: 6,400 lb (2,900 kg) bombs or 2 × 2,000 lb (910 kg) torpedoes

== See also ==
Aircraft of comparable role, configuration, and era

- Blackburn Firebrand
- Goodyear F2G Corsair
- Westland Wyvern

Related lists

- List of aircraft of World War II
- List of fighter aircraft
- List of aircraft of the U.S. military, World War II
