= Pratt & Whitney R-4360 Wasp Major =

R-28 piston aircraft engine family

R-4360 Wasp Major
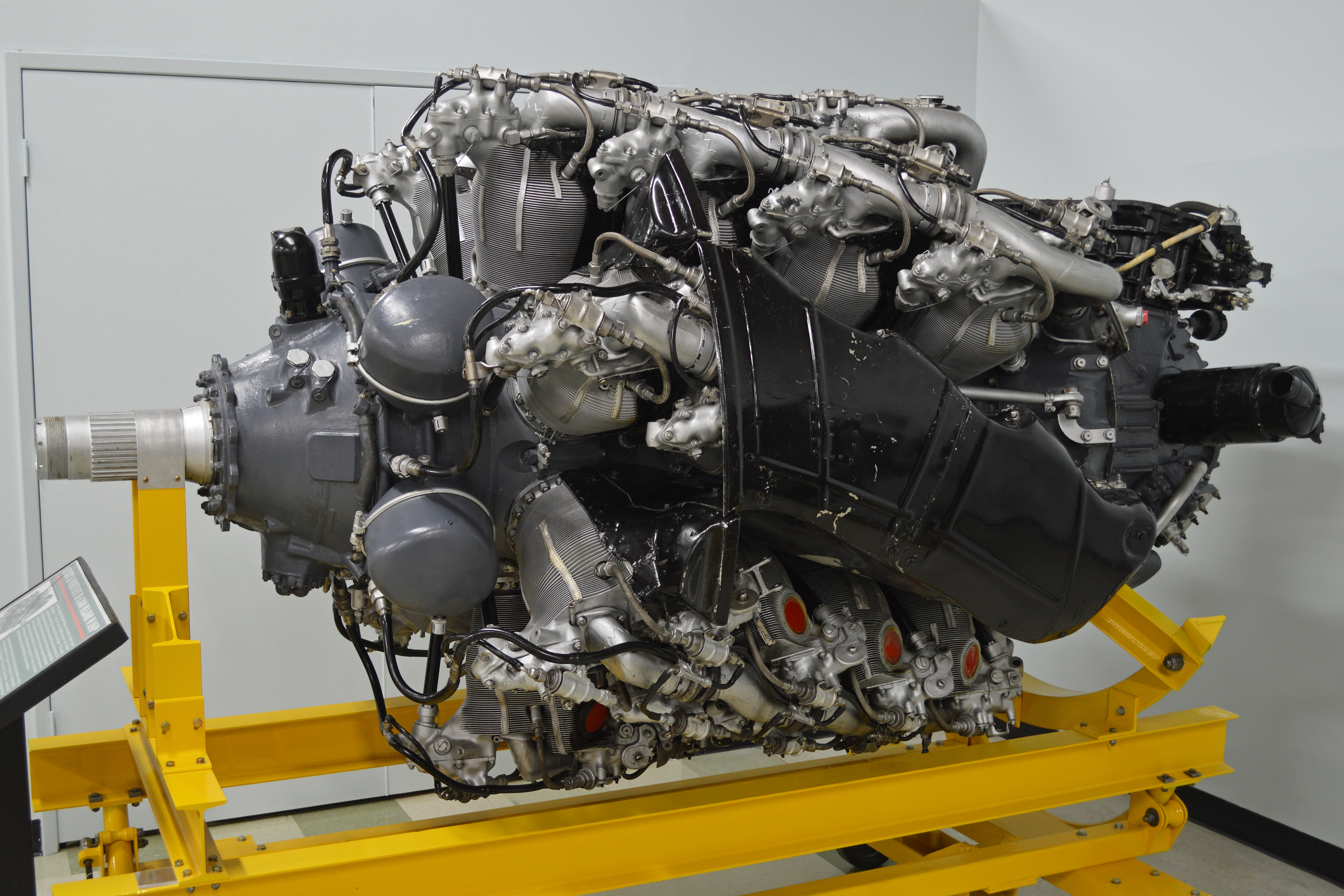
- Pratt & Whitney R-4360 Wasp Major on display at Travis Air Force Base Aviation Museum
- Type: Four-row Radial engine
- National origin: United States
- Manufacturer: Pratt & Whitney
- First run: 28 April 1941 (prototype); 1944 (production)
- Major applications: Boeing 377; Boeing B-50 Superfortress; Boeing C-97 Stratofreighter; Convair B-36; Fairchild C-119 Flying Boxcar
- Manufactured: 1944–1955
- Number built: 18,679
- Developed from: Pratt & Whitney R-2800 Double Wasp; Pratt & Whitney R-2180-A Twin Hornet
- Developed into: Pratt & Whitney R-2180-E Twin Wasp E

The Pratt & Whitney R-4360 Wasp Major is an American 28-cylinder four-row radial piston aircraft engine designed and built during World War II. At 4,362.5 cu in (71.5 L), it is the largest-displacement aviation piston engine to be mass-produced in the United States, and at up to 4,300 hp (3,200 kW) the most powerful. The prototype first ran on 28 April 1941, with production-standard engines running in 1944. It was the last of the Pratt & Whitney Wasp family, and the culmination of its maker's piston engine technology.

The war was over before it could power airplanes into combat. It powered many of the last generation of large piston-engined aircraft before turbojets, but was supplanted by equivalent (and superior) powered turboprops (such as the Allison T56).

Its main rival was the twin-row, 18-cylinder, nearly 3,350 cu in (54.9 L) displacement, up to 3,700 hp (2,800 kW) Wright R-3350 Duplex-Cyclone, first run some seven years earlier (May 1937).

== Design and development ==
The R-4360 was a 28-cylinder four-row air-cooled radial engine. Each row of seven air-cooled cylinders possessed a slight angular offset from the previous, forming a semi-helical arrangement to facilitate effective airflow cooling of the cylinder rows behind them, inspiring the engine's "corncob" nickname. A mechanical supercharger geared at 6.374:1 ratio to engine speed provided forced induction, while the propeller was geared at 0.375:1 so that the tips did not reach inefficient supersonic speeds.

The first prototype R-4360 was assembled using a modified H-3130 nose case and reduction gear, a supercharger and Bendix PT-13 carburetor from the R-2800 “B” series, and connecting rods from the R-2180. It was successfully test-run on 28 April 1941. The first airborne tests followed shortly thereafter. A modified Vultee A-31 Vengeance, designated V-85, served as the testbed, and the R-4360 made its maiden flight on 25 April 1942.

The engine was a technological challenge and the first product from Pratt and Whitney's new plant near Kansas City, Missouri. The four-row configuration had severe thermal problems that decreased reliability, with an intensive maintenance regime involving frequent replacement of cylinders required. Large cooling flaps were required, which decreased aerodynamic efficiency, putting extra demands on engine power when cooling needs were greatest. Owing in large part to the maintenance requirements of the R-4360, all airplanes equipped with it were costly to operate and suffered decreased availability. Its commercial application in the Boeing Stratocruiser was unprofitable without government subsidy. Abandonment of the Stratocruiser was almost immediate when jet aircraft became available, while aircraft with smaller powerplants such as the Lockheed Constellation and Douglas DC-6 remained in service well into the jet era.

Engine displacement was 4,362.5 cu in (71.5 L), hence the model designation. Initial models developed 3,000 hp (2,200 kW), and later models 3,500 hp (2,600 kW). One model that used two large turbochargers in addition to the supercharger delivered 4,300 horsepower (3,200 kW). Engines weighed 3,482–3,870 lb (1,579–1,755 kg), giving a power-to-weight ratio of 1.11 hp/lb (1.82 kW/kg).

Wasp Majors were produced between 1944 and 1955; 18,679 were built. (Note: 15,600 were built by Pratt & Whitney and the remainder by Ford Motor Company under license.)

A derivative engine, the Pratt & Whitney R-2180-E Twin Wasp E, was essentially the R-4360 "cut in half". It had two rows of seven cylinders each, and was used on the postwar Saab 90 Scandia airliner.

== Variants ==
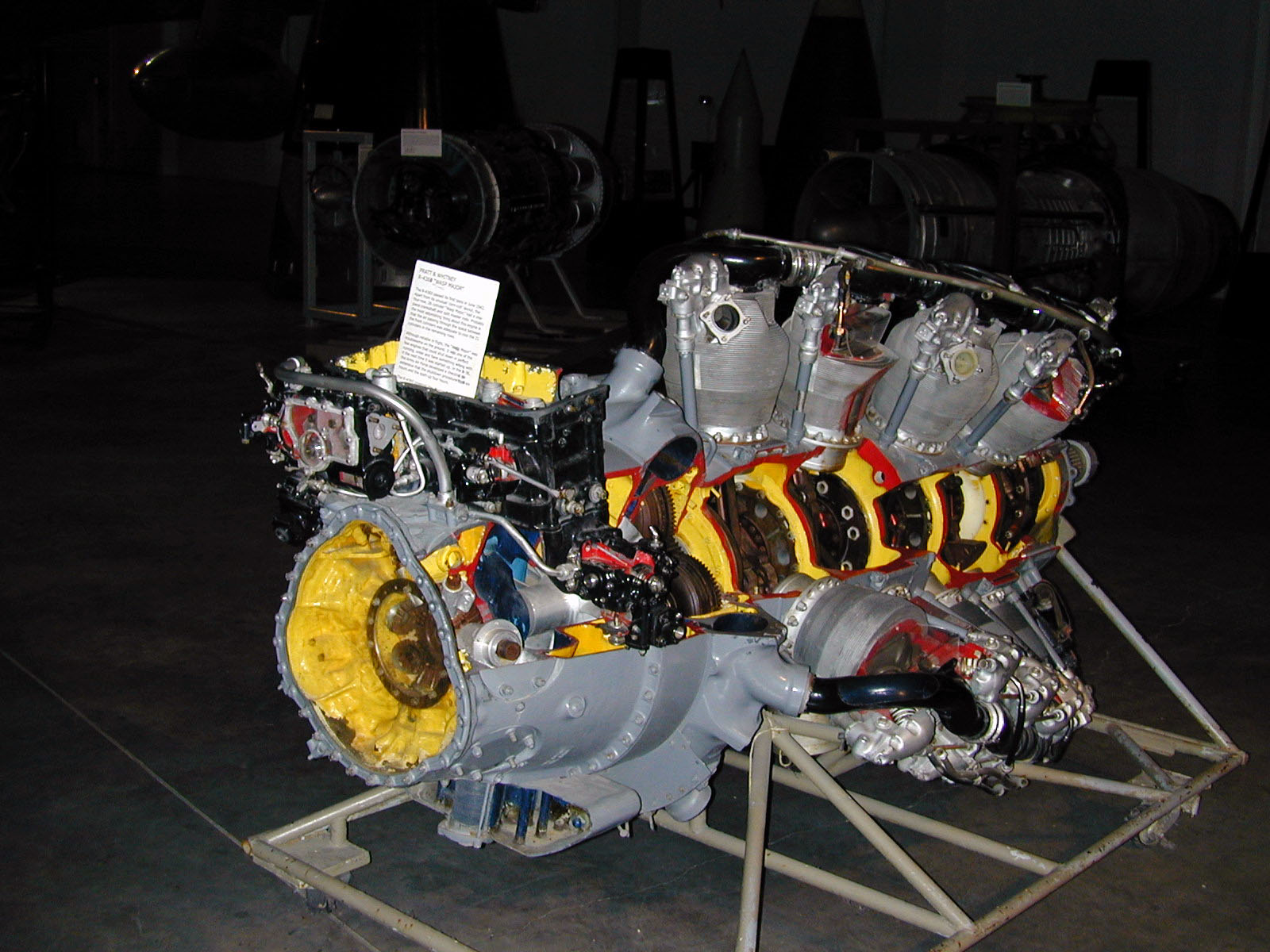
Sectioned R-4360 Wasp Major

The following is a representative list of R-4360 variants. Power ratings varied by model, installation, supercharging arrangement, and operating limits. Data from the Aircraft Engine Historical Society, Graham White's "R-4360: Pratt & Whitney's Major Miracle", and a Pratt & Whitney variant index unless otherwise noted.

Wasp Major B3
3,500 hp (2,600 kW)
Wasp Major B6
3,500 hp (2,600 kW)
R-4360-4
3,000 hp (2,200 kW)
R-4360-10
3,000 hp (2,200 kW); two-stage, dual-rotation engine for the Boeing XF8B.
R-4360-17
3,000 hp (2,200 kW); XB-35/YB-35 outboard engine.
R-4360-19
Republic XP-72 engine with remote auxiliary supercharger.
R-4360-20
3,500 hp (2,600 kW)
R-4360-21
3,000 hp (2,200 kW); XB-35/YB-35 inboard engine.
R-4360-25
3,000 hp (2,200 kW)
R-4360-35
3,500 hp (2,600 kW); Boeing B-50 engine.
R-4360-41
3,500 hp (2,600 kW)
R-4360-43 VDT
4,300 hp (3,200 kW) VDT-type tractor engine for the YB-50C/B-54. A modified B-50, redesignated B-50C, was flight-tested with one VDT nacelle in 1947.
R-4360-45
3,000 hp (2,200 kW); XB-35/YB-35 outboard single-rotation engine.
R-4360-47
3,000 hp (2,200 kW); XB-35/YB-35 inboard single-rotation engine.
R-4360-51 VDT
4,300 hp (3,200 kW); intended for the B-36C, but the program was cancelled before deliveries to the Air Force.
R-4360-55 VDT
4,300 hp (3,200 kW) low-compression VDT pusher development for the B-36C. Its high-altitude triple-turbosupercharger installation used two CHM-2 turbosuperchargers in parallel and one CH-8 in series, and demonstrated normal rated power at a simulated altitude of 50,000 ft (15,000 m).
R-4360-53
3,800 hp (2,800 kW)
R-4360-57 VDT
4,300 hp (3,200 kW) high-compression VDT development of the R-4360-55, with a 7.5:1 compression ratio. Some examples were built, but the engine did not enter production.

Note: VDT stands for "Variable Discharge Turbine".

== Applications ==
- Aero Spacelines Mini Guppy
- Aero Spacelines Pregnant Guppy
- Boeing 377 Stratocruiser
- Boeing B-50 Superfortress
- Boeing C-97 Stratofreighter
- Boeing KC-97 Stratofreighter
- Boeing XF8B
- Boeing XB-44 Superfortress
- Convair B-36 Peacemaker
- Convair XC-99
- Curtiss XBTC
- Curtiss XP-71 (not built)
- Douglas C-74 Globemaster
- Douglas C-124 Globemaster II
- Douglas XTB2D Skypirate
- Fairchild C-119 Flying Boxcar
- Fairchild XC-120 Packplane
- Goodyear F2G "Super" Corsair
- Hughes H-4 Hercules ("Spruce Goose")
- Hughes XF-11
- Lockheed R6V Constitution
- Martin AM Mauler
- Martin JRM Mars
- Martin P4M Mercator
- Northrop YB-35
- Republic XP-72
- Republic XF-12 Rainbow
- SNCASE SE-2010 Armagnac
- Vultee XA-41

== Engines on display ==
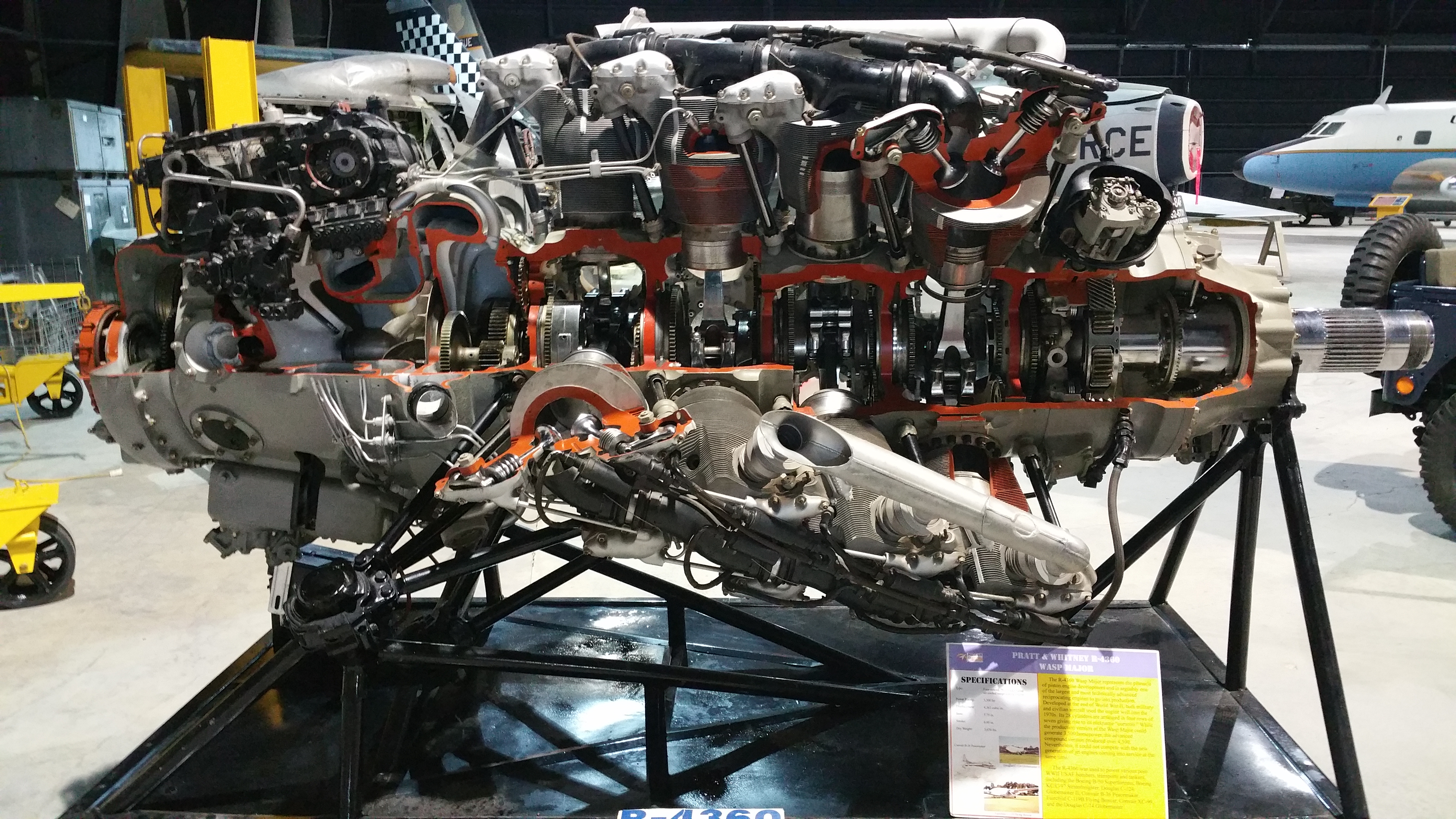
R-4360 cutaway

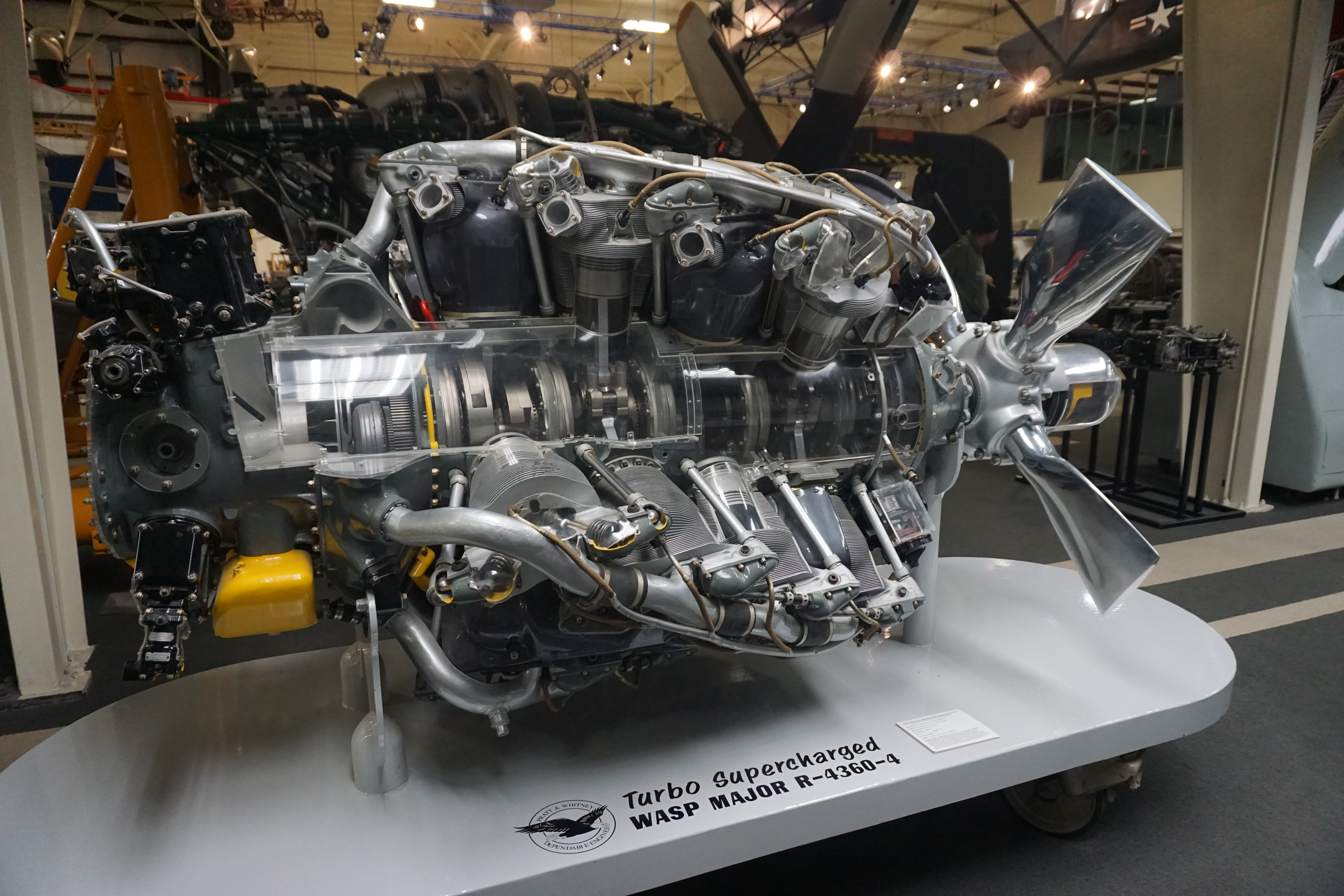
R-4360-4 on display at the Air Zoo

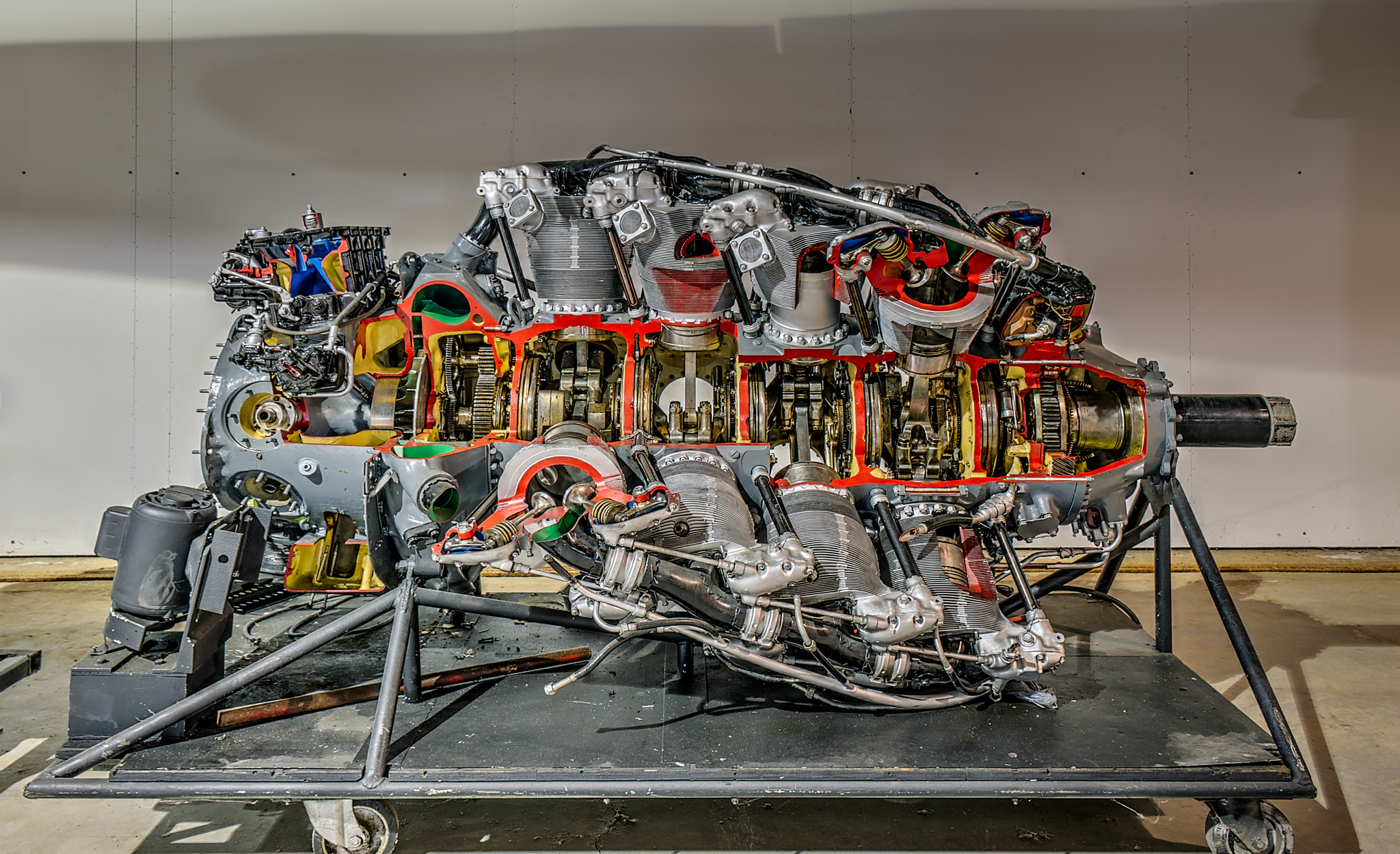
R-4360 on display at Museum of Aviation, Robins AFB

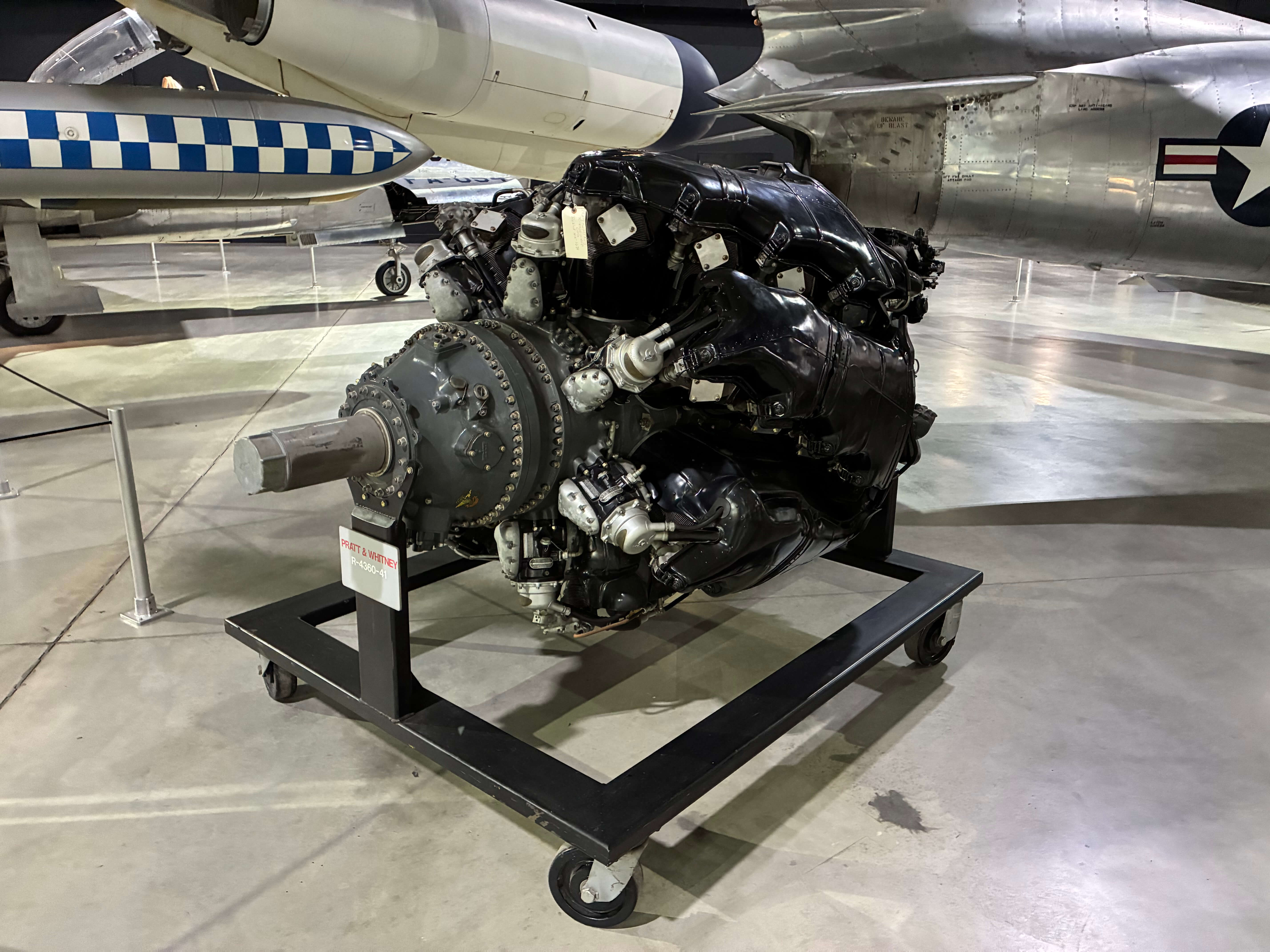
R-4360 on display at the National Museum of the United States Air Force in Dayton, Ohio

- An R-4360 is on display at the Mid America Museum of Aviation and Transportation in Sioux City, Iowa.
- An R-4360 is on display at the Museum of Flight in Seattle, Washington.
- An R-4360 is on display at the Heritage Flight Museum in Burlington, Washington.
- An R-4360 is on display at the New England Air Museum, in Windsor Locks, Connecticut.
- An R-4360 is on display at the Museum of Alaska Transportation and Industry in Wasilla, Alaska.
- An R-4360 is on display at the CAF Airpower Museum in Dallas, Texas.
- An R-4360-35 on a B-50 'QEC' stand is on display at the Air Zoo in Kalamazoo, Michigan.
- An R-4360-20WA is on display at the Teaneck Ignition Service in Teaneck, New Jersey.
- An R-4360-20WD is on display at the Combat Air Museum in Topeka, Kansas.
- An R-4360-59B is on display at the Combat Air Museum in Topeka, Kansas.
- An R-4360-69 is on display at the Castle Air Museum in Atwater, California.
- An R-4360 cutaway is on display at the Hill Aerospace Museum at Hill Air Force Base in Roy, Utah.
- An R-4360 cutaway is on display at the Air Victory Museum in Lumberton, New Jersey.
- An R-4360-4 cutaway is on display at the Air Zoo in Kalamazoo, Michigan.
- An R-4360 cutaway is on display at the Museum of Aviation in Warner Robins, Georgia.
- An R-4360 cutaway is on display at the Evergreen Aviation and Space Museum in McMinnville, Oregon.
- An R-4360 cutaway is on display at the CAF Airpower Museum in Dallas, Texas.
- An R-4360 cutaway is on display at the Pima Air and Space Museum in Tucson, Arizona.
- An R-4360 cutaway is on display at the Air Force Armament Museum at Eglin Air Force Base in Valparaiso, Florida.
- An R-4360 cutaway is on display at the Strategic Air Command & Aerospace Museum in Ashland, Nebraska.
- An R-4360-4 cutaway is on display at the National Museum of Naval Aviation in Pensacola, Florida.
- An R-4360-59B cutaway is on display at the Steven F. Udvar-Hazy Center of the National Air and Space Museum in Chantilly, Virginia.
- An R-4360-59B cutaway is on display at the Florida Air Museum in Lakeland, Florida.
- An R-4360 cutaway is on display at the Mid-Atlantic Air Museum, Reading, Pennsylvania
- Two R-4360s are on display at the National Museum of the United States Air Force in Dayton, Ohio.
- An operational R-4360 is on display at the Penngrove Power and Implement Museum in Penngrove, California.
- An operational R-4360 is on display at Nieman's Harley Rentals in St Helena, California

== Specifications (R-4360-51 VDT) ==
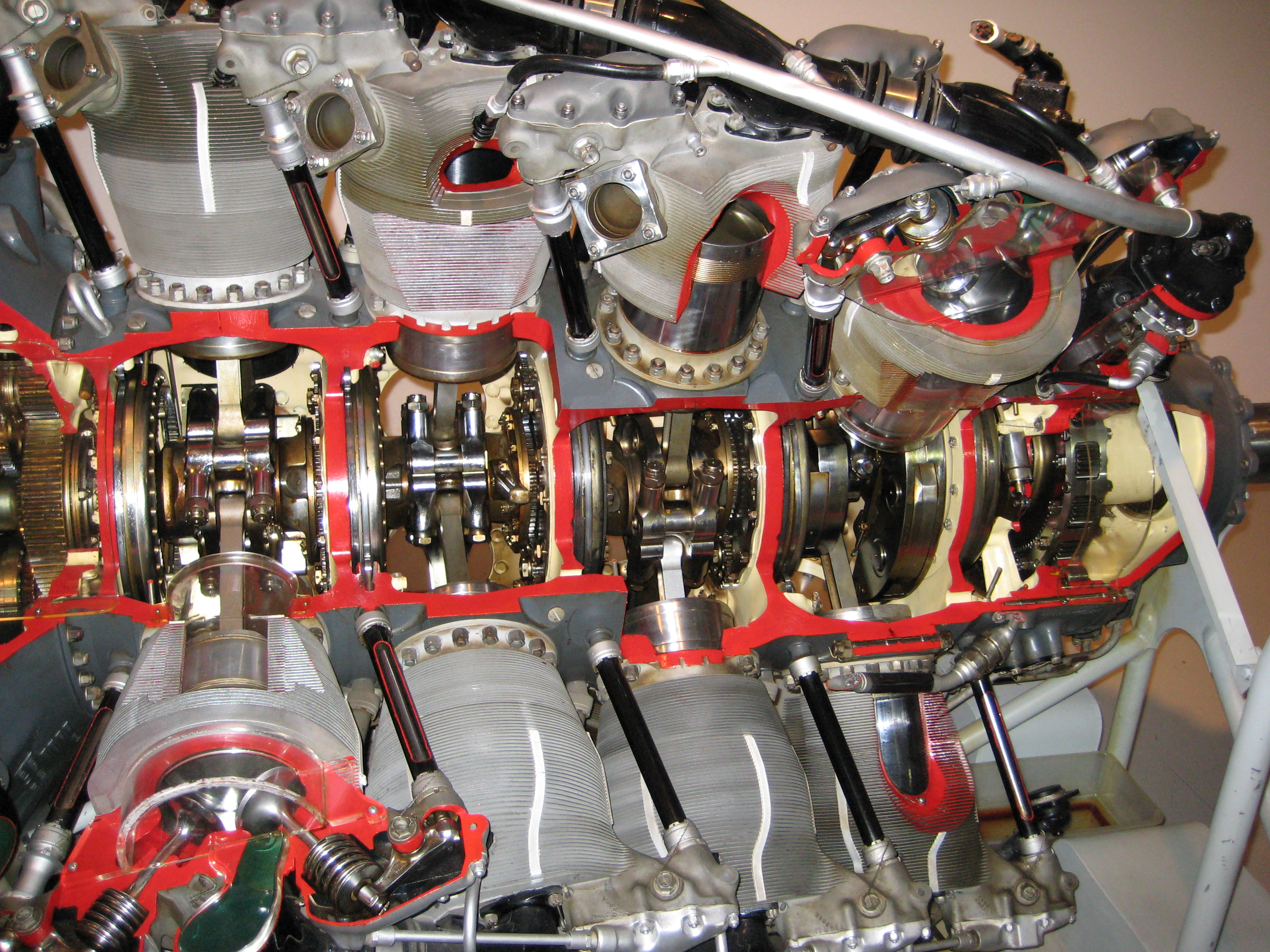
Pratt & Whitney R-4360 Wasp Major (sectioned)

Data from White, 1995

=== General characteristics ===
- Type: 28-cylinder supercharged air-cooled four-row radial engine
- Bore: 5.75 in (146 mm)
- Stroke: 6.00 in (152 mm).
- Displacement: 4,362.5 cu in (71.489 L)
- Length: 103 in (2,600 mm)
- Diameter: 61 in (1,500 mm)
- Dry weight: 3,720 lb (1,690 kg)

=== Components ===
- Valvetrain: Poppet, two valves per cylinder
- Supercharger: Gear-driven single stage variable speed centrifugal type supercharger
- Turbocharger: General Electric CHM-2 (optional)
- Fuel system: Bendix-Stromberg PR-100E2 pressure carburetor
- Fuel type: 115/145 Aviation gasoline
- Oil system: Dry sump
- Cooling system: Air-cooled

=== Performance ===
- Power output: 4,300 hp (3,200 kW) at 2800 rpm
- Specific power: 0.99 hp/cu in (45 kW/L)
- Compression ratio: 7:1
- Power-to-weight ratio: 1.16 hp/lb (1.91 kW/kg)

== See also ==
Related development

- Pratt & Whitney Wasp series
- Pratt & Whitney R-1830 Twin Wasp
- R-1535 Twin Wasp Junior
- Pratt & Whitney R-2180-A Twin Hornet
- Pratt & Whitney R-2180-E Twin Wasp E
- Pratt & Whitney R-2800 Double Wasp

Comparable engines

- BMW 803
- Shvetsov ASh-2
- Bristol Centaurus
- Lycoming XR-7755
- Wright R-3350 Duplex-Cyclone
- Wright R-4090 Cyclone 22

Related lists

- List of aircraft engines
