= Saab 90 Scandia =

Passenger aircraft

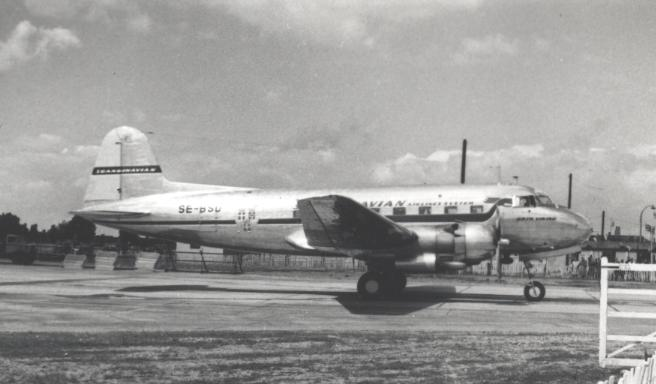
- Saab Scandia of SAS at London Airport-Heathrow in May 1953

General information
- Type: Airliner
- Manufacturer: Saab
- Status: Out of service, one preserved
- Primary users: VASP ABA, SAS
- Number built: 18

History
- Manufactured: 1946–1954
- Introduction date: 1950
- First flight: November 16, 1946

The Saab 90 Scandia was a civil passenger aeroplane, manufactured by Svenska Aeroplan Aktiebolaget (SAAB), in Linköping, Sweden. In 1944, as it became clear that hostilities in Europe (the Second World War) would soon end, SAAB realised that the company had to diversify from purely military endeavours if it were to survive. The board therefore decided to manufacture a twin-engined, short- to medium-haul passenger aircraft, as a successor for the Douglas DC-3. (This diversification also led to automobile production, with the Ursaab and subsequent Saab 92 passenger vehicles.)

The design of the 90 Scandia was quite similar to the DC-3. The most distinct visible difference was that the 90 had tricycle landing gear while the DC-3 had a tailwheel. The Scandia also had a quite different vertical stabilizer shape, and numerous more subtle differences. The 90 had to compete with the many surplus DC-3s available on the market at the same time, making sales difficult.

== Design and development ==
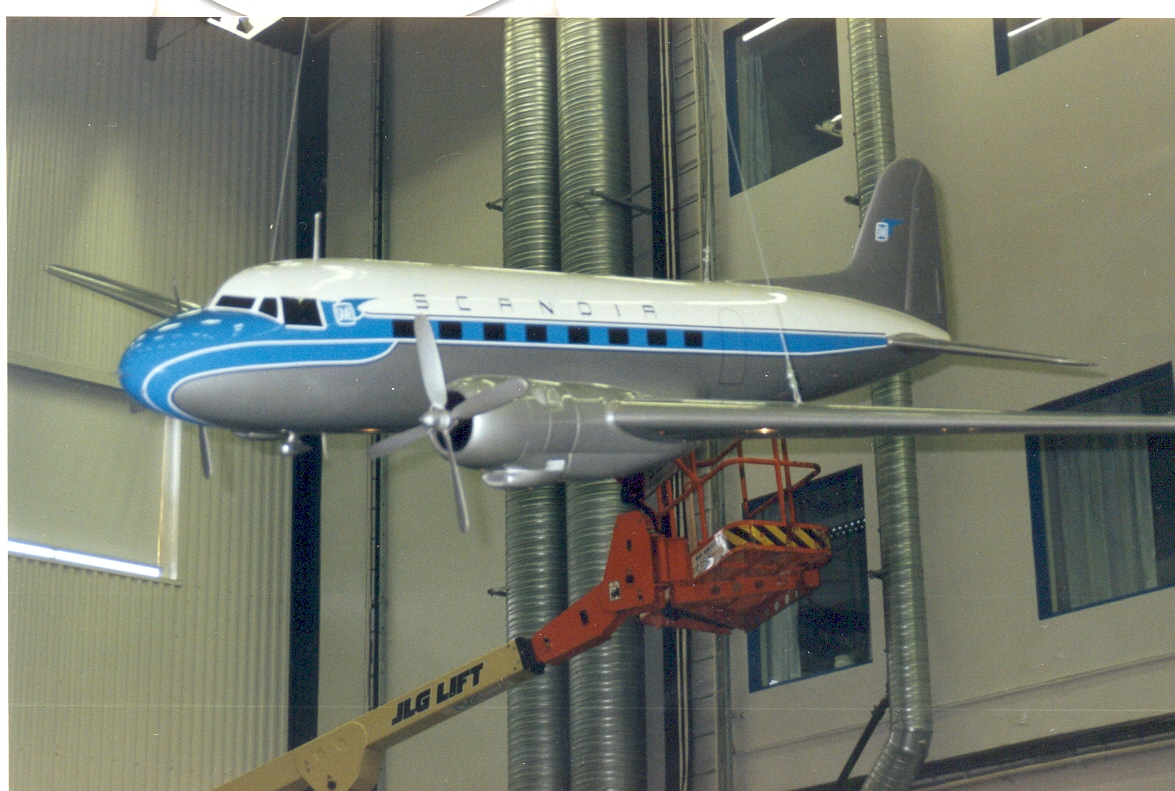
Model of Saab Scandia at Linköping

In late 1943, the design office of SAAB realised that the demand for military aircraft would be likely to considerably drop once the Second World War came to an end, and consultations were made with the Swedish airline AB Aerotransport to determine the airline's needs for new airliners. SAAB's board of directors decided to launch detailed design work on the new airliner, known initially as Projekt CT, in February 1944. The new airliner was intended to be a short to medium-range replacement for ABA's Douglas DC-3s. It was a low-winged, all-metal twin-engined aircraft and was planned to carry 25–30 passengers, with a range of about 1,000 kg (2,200 lb) and a take-off weight of about 11,600 kg (25,600 lb). Pratt & Whitney R-2000 Twin Wasp radial engines rated at 1,450 hp (1,080 kW) were chosen for the project, with the intention that the first prototype would fly in summer 1945.

Production of the prototype was delayed by industrial action in early 1945, and the desire to seek airworthiness certification under American rules to aid export sales. The project was publicly announced in December 1945, with the name SAAB 90 Scandia.

The prototype Saab 90 (Scandia) first flew in November 1946. It was capable of seating 24–32 passengers, with low-speed capability. It was to be fitted with Pratt & Whitney R-2000 engines. It had a single nosewheel and fully retractable landing gear. ABA Swedish Airlines, a predecessor of SAS, ordered 11 examples. The Type certificate was issued in June 1950. Delivery started in October 1950 but, after testing, specification had changed to the Pratt & Whitney R-2180-E Twin Wasp E. Two Brazilian airlines (VASP and Aerovias do Brasil) also ordered a total of six aircraft. The prototype was subsequently converted to a luxury private executive aircraft for the Brazilian industrialist Olavo Fontoura.

=== Design ===
The Scandia project was initiated in 1944 by a supposed need (after World War II) for an aircraft carrying 25–30 passengers for a distance of up to 1000 km.

Main design objectives were: safety; two engines; long life; economic operation.

The wing was shaped, using NACA profiles, to provide good stalling characteristics. Low wing design was chosen since it provided:

- Less structural weight
- Better safety in an emergency landing
- Possibility for one continuous flap

The wing was built in three pieces. The centre section with engine mounts, and left and right sections which were bolted to the centre section, immediately outboard of the engine nacelles.

The fuselage diameter was chosen to allow for four seats per row. This configuration gave a capacity of 32 passengers. A configuration with wider and more comfortable seats, three seats per row, carrying a total of 24 passengers was also offered. The prototype (90.001) was equipped with 1,450 bhp (1,080 kW) Pratt & Whitney Twin Wasp R2000 engines (changed to 1,650 bhp (1,230 kW) P&W Twin Wasp R2180 on the production version).

The entire aircraft was built of metal except for the rudders which were fabric-covered metal frames.

=== Test flights ===
The prototype (SE-BCA) made its first flight on November 16, 1946. Claes Smith was the pilot. The first flight lasted for 20 minutes. The plane had exceptionally good slow-flying characteristics, with full control down to 110–115 km/h. The stall was slow and preceded by vibrations. The plane also turned out to be easily maneuvered with one engine shut down, which at the time was typically not the case with twin-engined aircraft. Unfortunately the rudder harmony was not satisfactory, with high control forces in some situations. The engine installation also needed redesign.

The prototype flew a total of 154 hours before the winter of 1947/48 when it was parked in the hangar for modifications. The engines were elevated for increased clearance between propeller blades and ground. The cabin, which previously contained only test equipment, was furnished. On February 7, 1948, the prototype took off again and began the second testing phase. The second phase consisted of mainly performance tests. After 700 hours of test flying it was decided to introduce the following changes to the production planes:

- More powerful engines
- Four-blade Hamilton-Standard propellers
- Spring tabs on rudder and elevators for reduced control forces

== Operational history ==
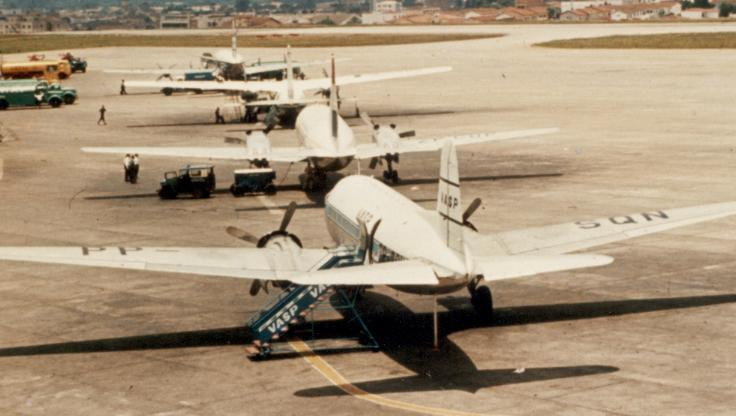
VASP Scandia PP-SQN (nearest) at São Paulo Congonhas airport in 1965

The first production Scandias were delivered in 1950. SAS received its eight aircraft between October 1950 and October 1954. SAS initially operated its Scandias on intra-Scandinavian flights. Scheduled services by Scandias were operated also to European cities including Amsterdam, Brussels and London Airport (Heathrow) between 1951 and 1955. Until Scandias were withdrawn in 1957 they also served in a modest first class configuration on the new route from Scandinavia to Moscow via Riga.

VASP operated its fleet of new and ex-SAS Scandias on intra-Brazilian scheduled flights between October 1950 and late 1966.

The Swedish Air Force put heavy and insistent demands upon the SAAB factory, for the Saab 29 fighter aircraft, which spelled the end of the Scandia project in Sweden, with residual production being undertaken by Fokker, in the Netherlands.

Altogether, only 18 examples were manufactured. The entire SAS fleet was eventually purchased by VASP, in 1957.

A larger version with pressurised cabin called 90B was planned, but never built.

The last flight with a 90 Scandia was on July 22, 1969. The sole surviving Scandia is the 16th built, ex VASP PP-SQR, which is preserved in deteriorating condition by a museum at Bebedouro in the state of São Paulo, Brazil.

== Variants ==
Saab 90A
Twin-engined short-range airliner. Main production version.
Saab 90B
Proposed version. Not built.

== Operators ==
Brazil

- VASP

Denmark, Norway and Sweden

- Scandinavian Airlines System (SAS)

Sweden

- Aktiebolaget Aerotransport (ABA)

== Accidents and incidents ==
Three VASP Scandias were lost in fatal crashes with a further two written off in non-fatal accidents.

- December 30, 1958: a VASP Saab Scandia 90A-1 registration PP-SQE flying from Rio de Janeiro-Santos Dumont to São Paulo-Congonhas during climb after takeoff had a failure on engine no. 1. The pilot initiated procedures to return to the airport but during the second turn the aircraft stalled and crashed into Guanabara Bay. Of the 34 passengers and crew aboard, 20 died.
- September 23, 1959: a VASP Saab Scandia 90A-1 registration PP-SQV en route from São Paulo-Congonhas to Rio de Janeiro-Santos Dumont during climb after takeoff did not gain enough height and crashed 1 1/2 minutes out of São Paulo, killing all 20 passengers and crew.
- November 26, 1962: a VASP Saab Scandia 90A-1 registration PP-SRA en route from São Paulo-Congonhas to Rio de Janeiro-Santos Dumont collided in the air over the Municipality of Paraibuna, State of São Paulo with a private Cessna 310, registration PT-BRQ, en route from Rio de Janeiro-Santos Dumont to São Paulo-Campo de Marte. Both were flying on the same airway AB-6 in opposite directions and failed to make visual contact. Both aircraft crashed, killing all 23 passengers and crew of the Saab and all four occupants of the Cessna.

== Surviving aircraft ==
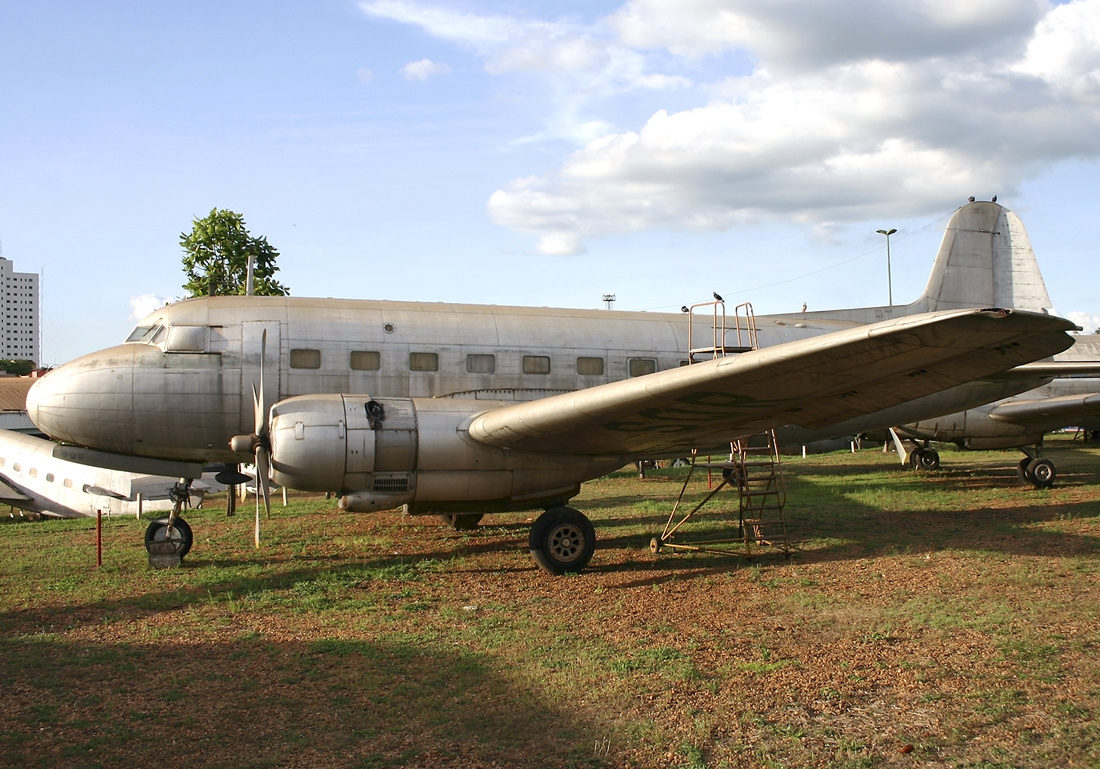
Saab 90 Scandia PP-SQR in Bebedouro, Brazil

As of 2007, only one 90 Scandia, PP-SQR, remains. It stands outdoors in at the Eduardo André Matarazzo Museum of Weapons, Vehicles and Machines in Bebedouro, Brazil.

== Specifications ==
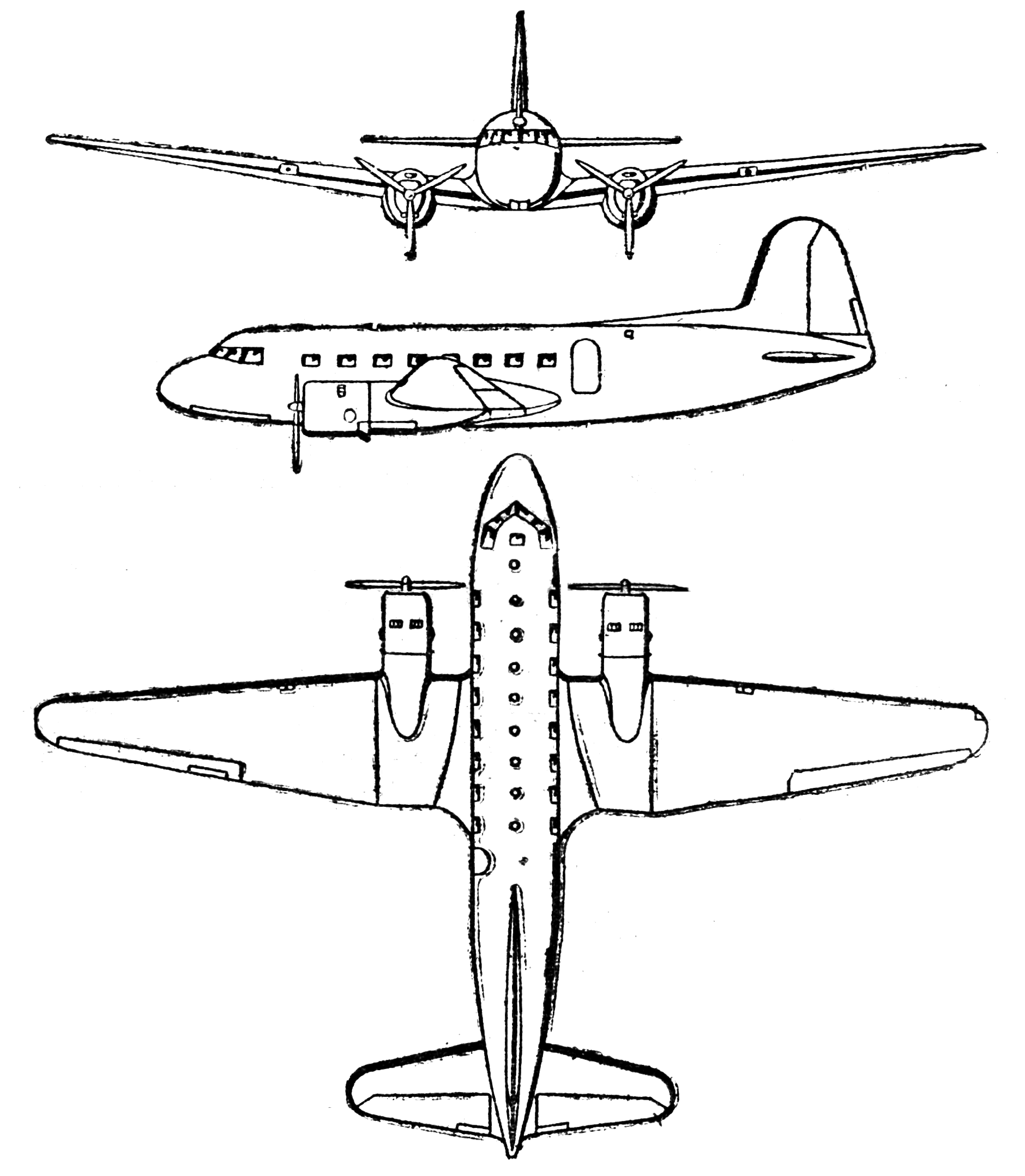
Saab 90 Scandia

Data from From Seventeen to Thirty-Nine,

General characteristics

- Crew: 3 + cabin attendant
- Capacity: 24 or 32 passengers / 10.7 m^{3} (377.9 cu ft) cargo underfloor
- Length: 21.3 m (69 ft 11 in)
- Wingspan: 28 m (91 ft 10 in)
- Height: 7.4 m (24 ft 3 in)
- Wing area: 85.7 m^{2} (922 sq ft)
- Aspect ratio: 9.15:1
- Empty weight: 9,960 kg (21,958 lb)
- Max takeoff weight: 15,900 kg (35,053 lb)
- Fuel capacity: 2,000 L (530 US gal; 440 imp gal)
- Powerplant: 2 × Pratt & Whitney R-2180-E Twin Wasp E 14-cylinder air-cooled radial piston engines, 1,361 kW (1,825 hp) each (with water injection)
- Propellers: 4-bladed constant-speed feathering propellers

Performance

- Maximum speed: 450 km/h (280 mph, 240 kn) at 2,600 m (8,530 ft)
- Cruise speed: 340 km/h (210 mph, 180 kn) (normal cruise)
- Range: 2,650 km (1,650 mi, 1,430 nmi)
- Service ceiling: 7,500 m (24,600 ft)
- Rate of climb: 7.5 m/s (1,480 ft/min)

== See also ==
Aircraft of comparable role, configuration, and era

- CASA C-207 Azor
- Convair CV-240 family
- Douglas DC-3
- Martin 4-0-4
- Vickers VC.1 Viking
