= Pratt & Whitney R-2180-A Twin Hornet =

1930s American aircraft radial engine

R-2180-A Twin Hornet
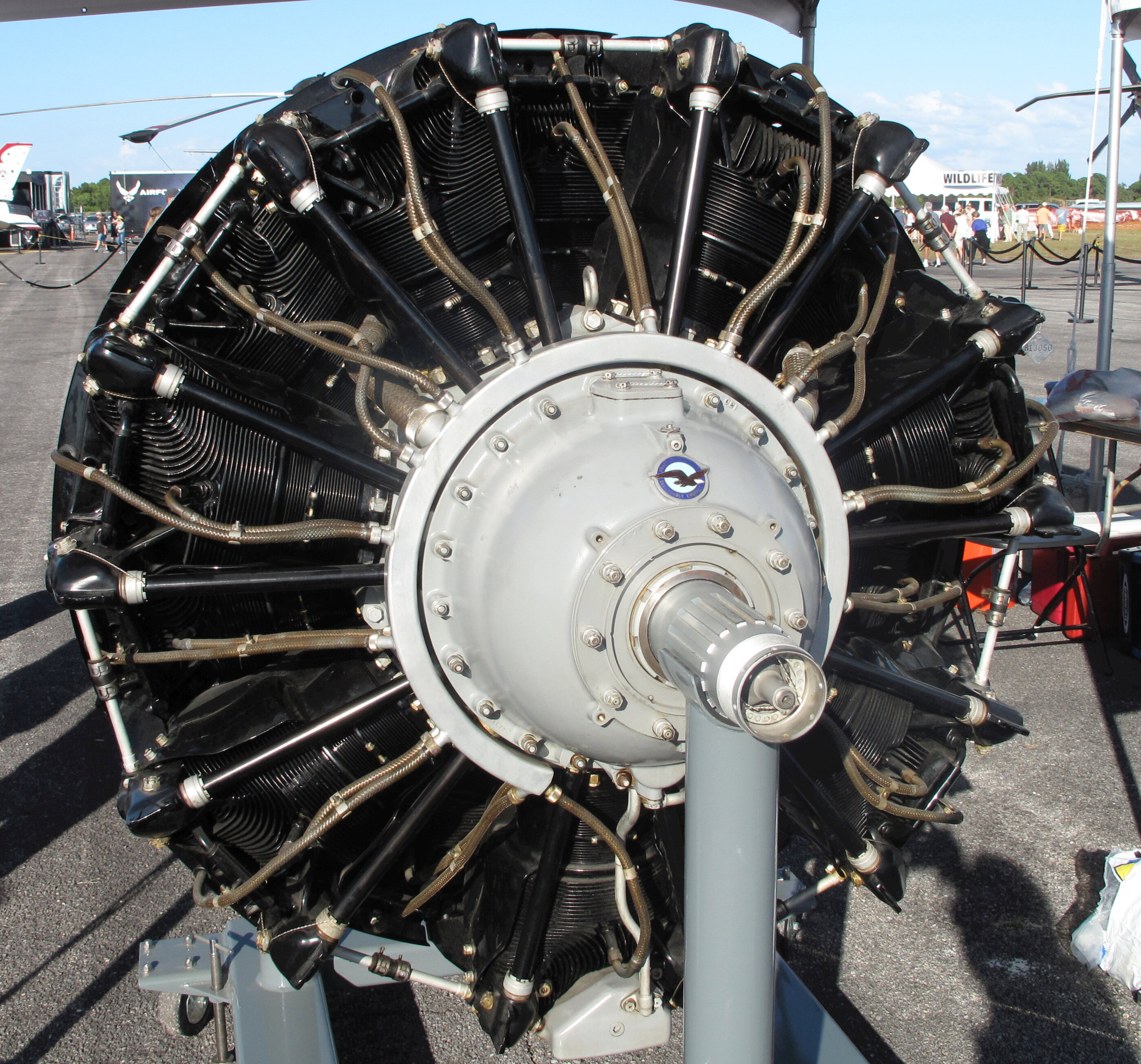
- Type: Radial engine
- National origin: United States
- Manufacturer: Pratt & Whitney
- First run: 1936
- Major applications: Douglas DC-4E
- Number built: 30
- Developed from: Pratt & Whitney R-1690
- Developed into: Pratt & Whitney R-2800; Pratt & Whitney R-4360

The Pratt & Whitney R-2180-A Twin Hornet was a radial engine developed in the United States by Pratt & Whitney. It had two rows of seven cylinders each.

== Applications ==
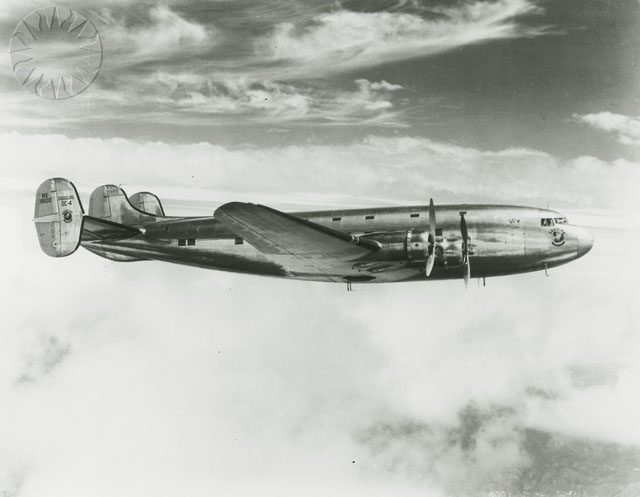
Douglas DC-4E powered by four P&W R-2180-A Twin Hornet engines

- Douglas DC-4E
- North American XB-21
- Republic P-44 Rocket
- Saab 90 Scandia
- Stearman XA-21

== Specifications (R-2180-A) ==
Data from The Engines of Pratt & Whitney: A Technical History

=== General characteristics ===
- Type: 14-cylinder air-cooled, twin-row radial engine
- Bore: 5.75 in. (146 mm)
- Stroke: 6.00 in. (152 mm)
- Displacement: 2,181 in³ (35.7 L)
- Length: 76.20 in (1.94 m)
- Diameter: 54 in (1.37 m)
- Dry weight: 1,565 lb-1,647 lb

=== Components ===
- Cooling system: Air-cooled

=== Performance ===
- Power output: 1,200-1,500 hp

== See also ==
Related development

- Pratt & Whitney R-1690 Hornet
- Pratt & Whitney R-1830 Twin Wasp
- Pratt & Whitney R-2180-E Twin Wasp E
- Pratt & Whitney R-2800 Double Wasp
- Pratt & Whitney R-4360 Wasp Major

Comparable engines

- Gnome-Rhône 14N
- Mitsubishi Kinsei
- Piaggio P.XIX

Related lists

- List of aircraft engines
