= Pratt & Whitney R-2180-E Twin Wasp E =

American radial aircraft engine

R-2180-E Twin Wasp E
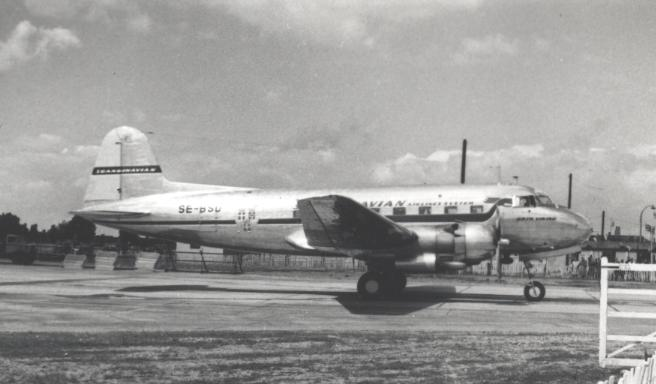
- A Saab Scandia powered by two P&W R-2180 Twin Wasp E engines
- Type: Radial engine
- National origin: United States
- Manufacturer: Pratt & Whitney
- First run: 25 September 1945
- Major applications: Saab 90 Scandia; Piasecki H-16 Transporter
- Manufactured: 1949–1951
- Number built: 75
- Developed from: Pratt & Whitney R-2800; Pratt & Whitney R-4360

The Pratt & Whitney R-2180-E Twin Wasp E was a radial aircraft engine developed in the United States by Pratt & Whitney. It had two rows of seven cylinders each. Its only production application was on the post-World War II Saab 90 Scandia airliner.

== Design and development ==
The R-2180-E Twin Wasp E was a post-World War II development of Pratt & Whitney's large radial engine family. It was effectively a fourteen-cylinder simplification of the twenty-eight-cylinder R-4360 Wasp Major engine; its cylinders are the same size and displacement as those of the Wasp Major. The engine first ran on 25 September 1945 and was first shipped on 31 January 1949.

The R-2180-E Twin Wasp E was available in a "power-egg" installation certificated in 1945 for use as an engine upgrade for the Douglas DC-4. Pratt & Whitney built 75 R-2180 Series E engines before production ended in 1951.

== Applications ==
- Piasecki XH/YH-16 Transporter
- Saab 90 Scandia

== Specifications (R-2180-E1) ==
Data from Aviation Week and Pratt & Whitney characteristics table

=== General characteristics ===
- Type: 14-cylinder, supercharged, air-cooled, twin-row radial engine
- Bore: 5.75 in. (146 mm)
- Stroke: 6.00 in. (152 mm)
- Displacement: 2,181 in³ (35.7 L)
- Length: 76.20 in (1.94 m)
- Diameter: 54 in (1.37 m)
- Dry weight: 1,870 lb (850 kg)

=== Components ===
- Supercharger: Centrifugal supercharger, 7:1 impeller ratio
- Fuel system: Stromberg AR-48C1
- Fuel type: 100/130 octane
- Cooling system: Air-cooled

=== Performance ===
- Power output:
  - Take-off without water injection: 1,650 hp (1,230 kW) at 2,800 rpm at 3,000 ft (910 m)
  - Take-off with water injection: 1,800 hp (1,300 kW) at 2,800 rpm at 2,500 ft (760 m)
  - Maximum continuous: 1,400 hp (1,000 kW) at 2,700 rpm at 6,200 ft (1,900 m)
  - Normal: 1,300 hp (970 kW) at 2,600 rpm at 5,000 ft (1,500 m)
- Compression ratio: 6.7:1

== See also ==
Related development

- Pratt & Whitney R-2180-A Twin Hornet
- Pratt & Whitney R-1830 Twin Wasp
- Pratt & Whitney R-2000 Twin Wasp
- Pratt & Whitney R-2800 Double Wasp
- Pratt & Whitney R-4360 Wasp Major

Related lists

- List of aircraft engines
