= Pratt & Whitney R-2000 Twin Wasp =

Radial aircraft engine

R-2000 Twin Wasp
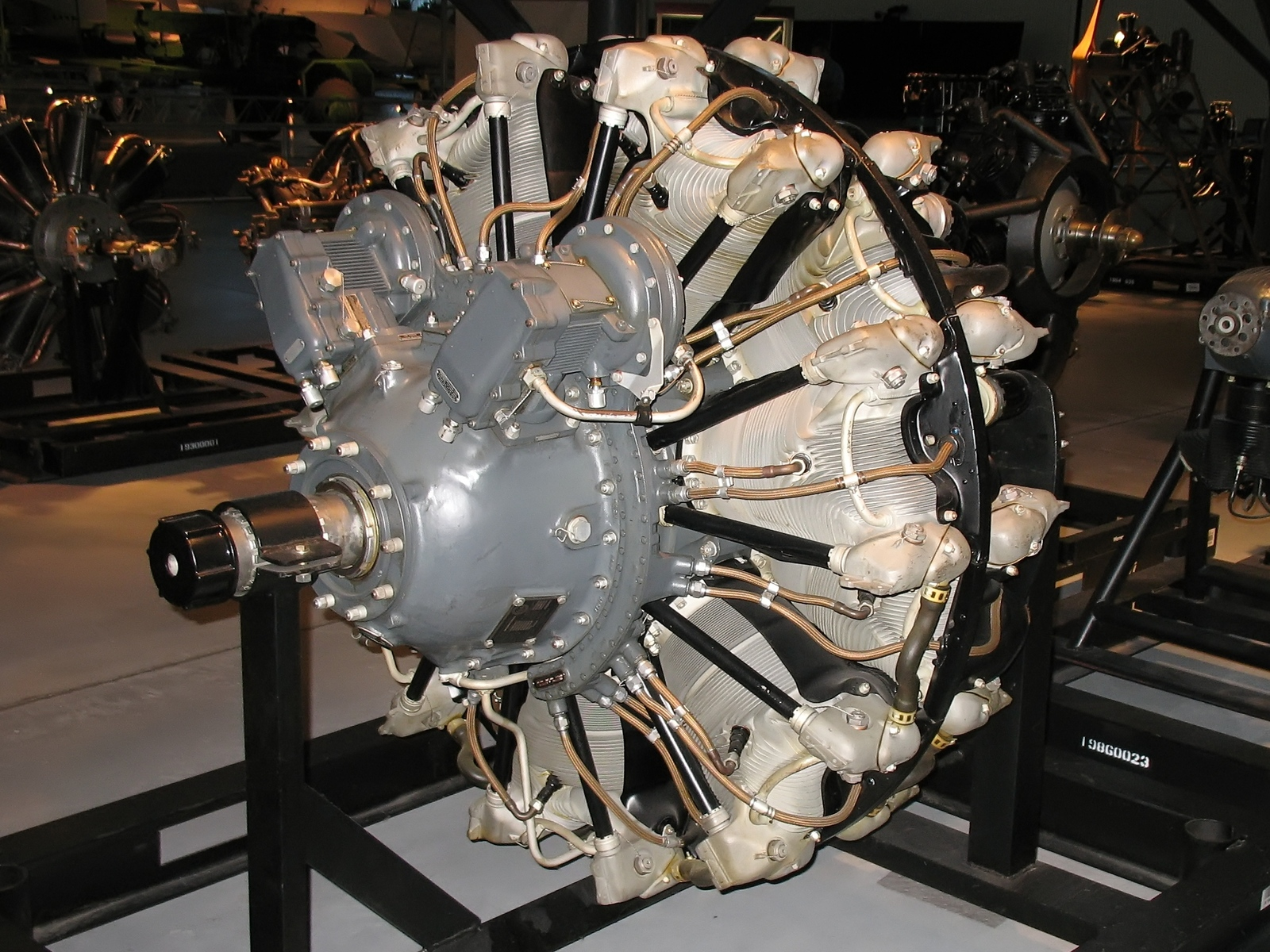
- A preserved R-2000 Twin Wasp
- Type: Radial engine
- National origin: United States
- Manufacturer: Pratt & Whitney
- First run: 21 May 1940
- Major applications: C-54 Skymaster; Douglas DC-4; de Havilland Canada DHC-4 Caribou
- Manufactured: 1941–1959
- Number built: 12,966
- Developed from: Pratt & Whitney R-1830 Twin Wasp

The Pratt & Whitney R-2000 Twin Wasp is an American radial engine developed in 1942 to power military aircraft. It is one of the Pratt & Whitney Wasp series of radial engines.

== Design and development ==
The R-2000 was an enlarged version of the Pratt & Whitney R-1830 Twin Wasp, with focus on reducing the manufacturing costs and fuel requirements. The bore was increased to 5.75 in (146 mm), while it still retained the 5.5 in (140 mm) stroke. This brought displacement up to 2,000 in^{3} (32.8 L). There were a number of detail changes from the R-1830, such as front-mounted instead of rear-mounted magnetos (as with the larger, and earlier Double Wasp), plain bearings for the crankshaft rather than roller bearings, and 87 octane fuel (specified because there were fears wartime supplies of 100 octane might fall short, but those fears were groundless).

The R-2000 produced 1,300 hp (970 kW) at 2,700 rpm with 87 octane fuel, 1,350 hp (1,010 kW) with 100 octane fuel and 1,450 hp (1,080 kW) at 2,800 rpm with 100/130-grade fuel.

== Applications ==
- Aviation Traders Carvair
- Douglas C-54 Skymaster
- Douglas DC-4
- Douglas Hyper DC-3
- de Havilland Canada DHC-4 Caribou
- Vought XF5U

== Specifications (R-2000 2SD1-G) ==
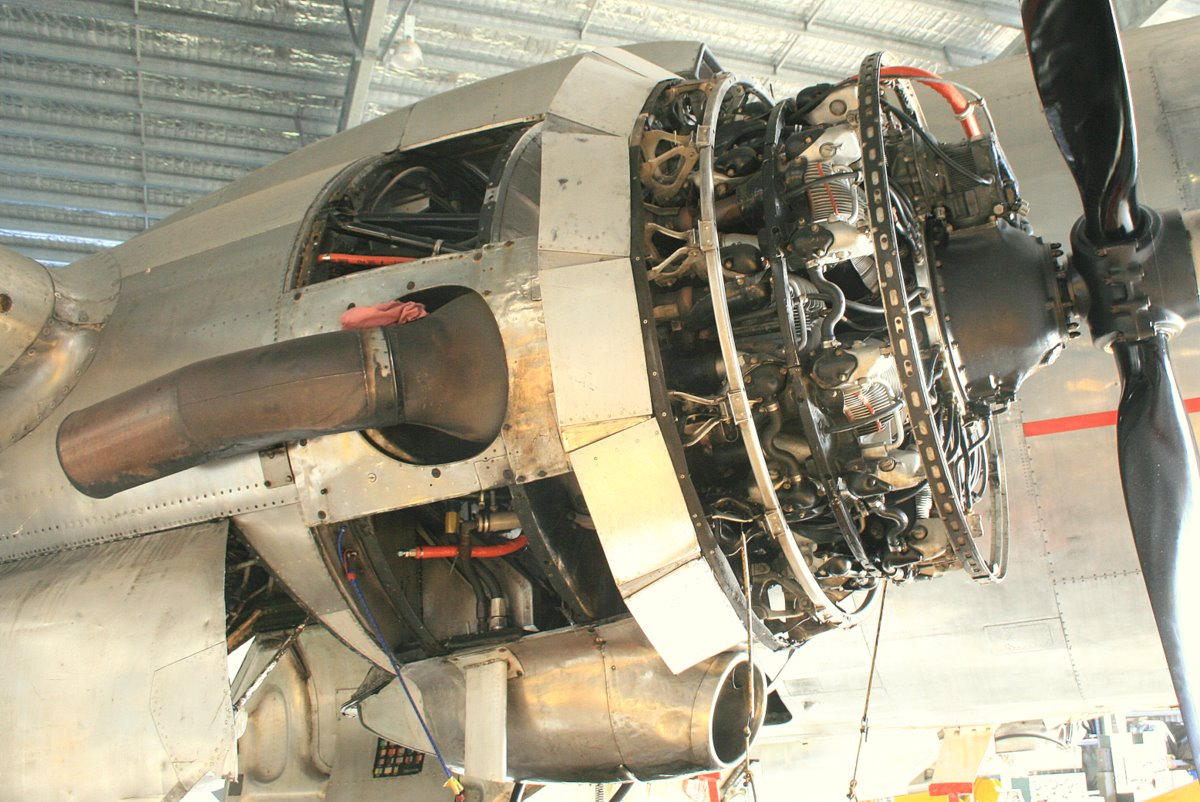
R-2000 mounted on the wing of a Douglas DC-4

Data from Aircraft Engines of the World

=== General characteristics ===
- Type: Twin-row radial engine, 14-cylinder
- Bore: 5.75 in (146.05 mm)
- Stroke: 5.5 in (139.7 mm)
- Displacement: 2,004 in^{3} (32.84 L)
- Length: 60.7 in (1,540 mm)
- Diameter: 49.5 in (1,260 mm)
- Dry weight: 1,590 lb (720 kg)

=== Components ===
- Supercharger: 2-speed
- Fuel system: Stromberg carburetor
- Fuel type: 100/130 grade gasoline
- Cooling system: Air-cooled
- Reduction gear: 2:1

=== Performance ===
- Power output:
  - 1,450 hp (1,080 kW) at 2,700 rpm (take-off rating)
  - 1,450 hp (1,080 kW) at 2,700 rpm at 1,000 ft (300 m) (low-altitude military rating)
  - 1,100 hp (820 kW) at 2,700 rpm at 16,000 ft (4,900 m) (high-altitude military rating)
  - 1,100 hp (820 kW) at 2,550 rpm at 7,500 ft (2,300 m) (low-altitude normal rating)
  - 1,000 hp (750 kW) at 2,550 rpm at 17,000 ft (5,200 m) (high-altitude normal rating)
  - 735 hp (548 kW) at 2,230 rpm at 14,700 ft (4,500 m) (cruise rating)
  - 700 hp (520 kW) at 2,150 rpm at 2,150 ft (660 m) (cruise rating)
- Compression ratio: 6.5:1

== See also ==
Related development

- Pratt & Whitney R-1340 Wasp
- Pratt & Whitney R-985 Wasp Junior
- Pratt & Whitney R-1535 Twin Wasp Junior
- Pratt & Whitney R-1830 Twin Wasp
- Pratt & Whitney R-2800 Double Wasp
- Pratt & Whitney R-4360 Wasp Major

Related lists

- List of aircraft engines
