= Pratt & Whitney R-1830 Twin Wasp =

1932 14-cylinder radial piston engine family by Pratt & Whitney

R-1830 Twin Wasp
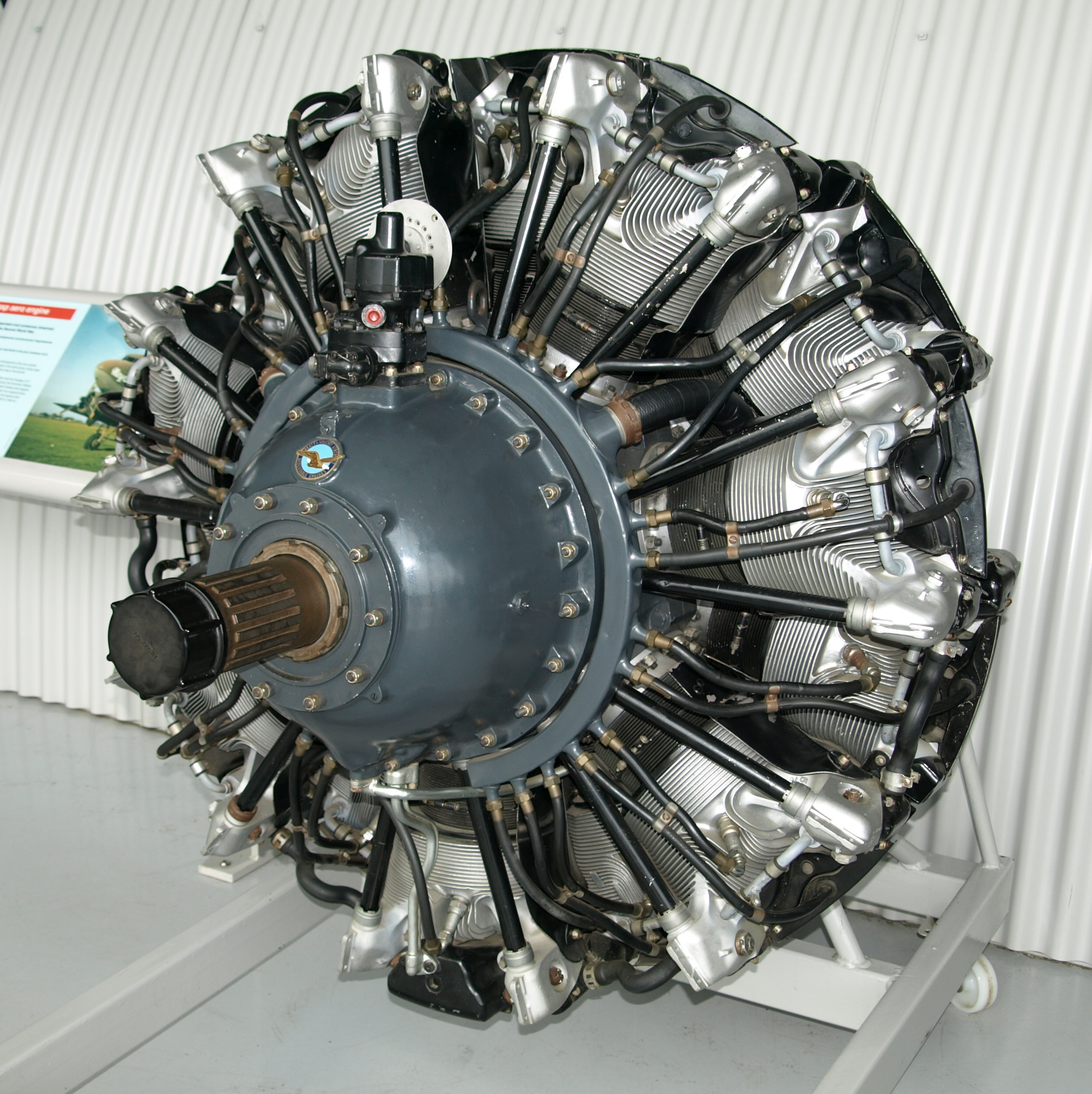
- R-1830 on display at the Imperial War Museum Duxford
- Type: Radial engine
- National origin: United States
- Manufacturer: Pratt & Whitney
- First run: 16 April 1931
- Major applications: Consolidated B-24 Liberator; Douglas C-47 Skytrain; Douglas DC-3; Grumman F4F Wildcat; Consolidated PBY Catalina; Douglas TBD Devastator; Short Sunderland; Vickers Wellington
- Manufactured: 1932–1951
- Number built: 173,618
- Variants: Pratt & Whitney R-2000 Twin Wasp

The Pratt & Whitney R-1830 Twin Wasp is an American air-cooled radial aircraft engine. It has 14 cylinders, arranged in two rings of seven. It displaces 1,830 cu in (30.0 L) and its bore and stroke are both 5.5 in (140 mm). The design traces its history to 1929 experiments at Pratt & Whitney on twin-row designs. Production began in 1932 and it was widely used during the 1930s.

It was selected as the power plant for both the four-engined Consolidated B-24 Liberator heavy bomber and the twin-engined Douglas DC-3 transport, two of the most-produced aircraft. The production run of 173,618 R-1830 examples makes it the most-produced aviation engine in history.

A further developed version, the R-2000, was produced starting in 1942. The R-2000 was "bored-out" to 5.75 in (146 mm) and had a number of other minor changes to improve fuel economy and allow it to run at higher power ratings on lower-octane fuel. The primary user of the R-2000 was the Douglas DC-4.

Mostly retired today, the R-1830 is still used on Douglas DC-3 and various museum aircraft and warbirds seen at airshow. Spares are still available and there is still a market for second-hand engines and parts.

== Variants ==
R-1830-1
800 hp (600 kW)
R-1830-9
850 hp (630 kW), 950 hp (710 kW)
R-1830-11
800 hp (600 kW)
R-1830-13
900 hp (670 kW), 950 hp (710 kW), 1,050 hp (780 kW)
R-1830-17
1,200 hp (890 kW)
R-1830-21
1,200 hp (890 kW)
R-1830-25
1,100 hp (820 kW)
R-1830-33
1,200 hp (890 kW)
R-1830-35
1,200 hp (890 kW) Fitted with GE B-2 turbosupercharger
R-1830-41
1,200 hp (890 kW) Fitted with GE B-2 turbosupercharger
R-1830-43
1,200 hp (890 kW)
R-1830-45
1,050 hp (780 kW)
R-1830-49
1,200 hp (890 kW)
R-1830-64
850 hp (630 kW), 900 hp (670 kW)
R-1830-65
1,200 hp (890 kW)
R-1830-66
1,000 hp (750 kW), 1,050 hp (780 kW), 1,200 hp (890 kW)
R-1830-72
1,050 hp (780 kW)
R-1830-75
1,350 hp (1,010 kW)
R-1830-76
1,200 hp (890 kW)
R-1830-82
1,200 hp (890 kW)
R-1830-86
1,200 hp (890 kW)
R-1830-88
1,200 hp (890 kW)
R-1830-90
1,200 hp (890 kW)
R-1830-90-B
1,200 hp (890 kW)
R-1830-92
1,200 hp (890 kW)
R-1830-94
1,350 hp (1,010 kW)
R-1830-S1C3-G
1,050 hp (780 kW), 1,200 hp (890 kW)
R-1830-S3C4-G
1,200 hp (890 kW)
R-1830-S6C3-G
1,100 hp (820 kW)
R-1830-SC-G
900 hp (670 kW)
R-1830-SC2-G
900 hp (670 kW), 1,050 hp (780 kW)
R-1830-SCG-3
1,650 hp (1,230 kW) same engine built in Sweden as STWC-3G by SFA company for Swedish J 22, B 17 and B 18.

== Applications ==
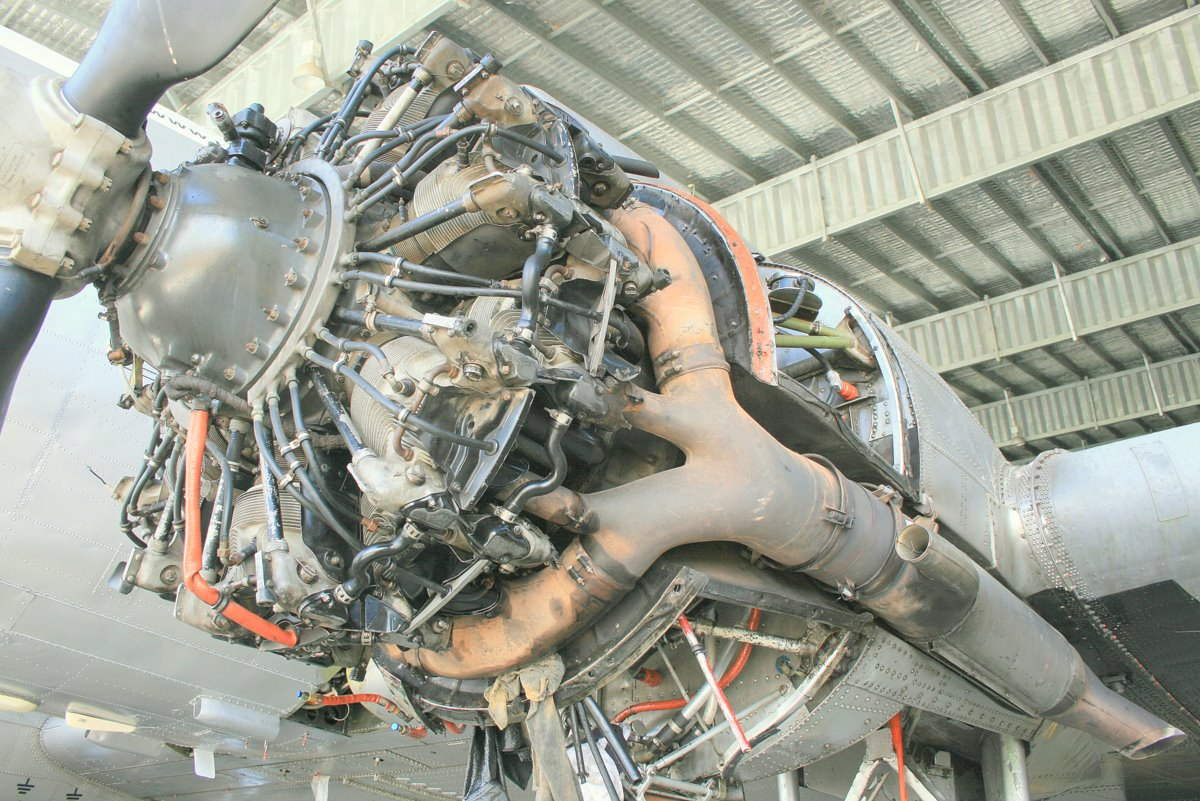
R-1830 mounted on the left wing of an ex-military Douglas C-47

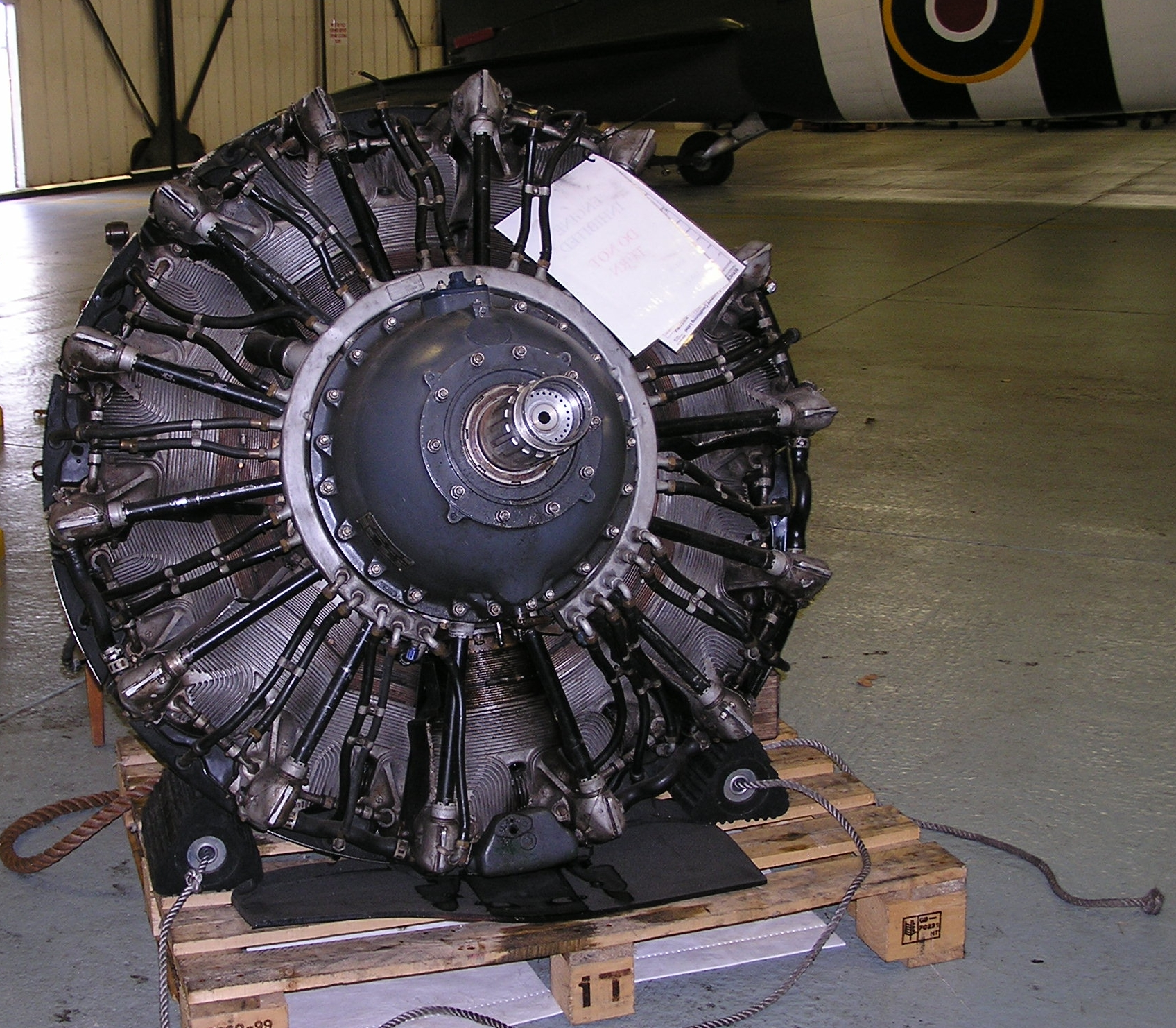
RAF Dakota's Twin Wasp out for servicing

- Bloch MB.176
- Boeing XB-15
- Budd RB Conestoga
- Burnelli CBY-3
- CAC Boomerang – Australian "emergency fighter"
- CAC Woomera
- Chu XP-0
- Consolidated B-24 Liberator
- Consolidated PBY Catalina
- Consolidated PB2Y Coronado
- Consolidated PB4Y Privateer
- Curtiss P-36 Hawk
- DAP Beaufort – Australian-built variants of Bristol Beaufort
- Douglas C-47 Skytrain
- Douglas DC-3
- Douglas DB-7 – early variants only
- Douglas TBD Devastator
- FFVS J 22 – "emergency fighter"; built in-house by the Swedish Air Force
- Grumman F4F Wildcat
- I.Ae. 24 Calquin
- Laird-Turner Meteor LTR-14
- Lioré et Olivier LeO 453
- Lockheed Model 18 Lodestar
- Lisunov Li-3 – a Yugoslav version of the Lisunov Li-2
- Martin Maryland
- Martin M-130
- Republic P-43 Lancer
- Saab 17
- Saab 18
- Short Sunderland V
- Seversky P-35
- Vickers Wellington IV
- VL Myrsky – Finnish "emergency fighter"
- Vultee P-66 Vanguard

== Engines on display ==
- Model R-1830-65 on display at the Museo Nacional de Aeronautica, Buenos Aires, Argentina
- Model R-1830-86 on display at the New England Air Museum, Bradley International Airport, Windsor Locks, Connecticut.
- Model R-1830-90C on display at the Dutch aviation museum Aviodrome
- Model R-1830-92 displayed at the Smithsonian Institution's National Air and Space Museum in Washington, DC
- Model R-1830 on display at the Northeast Classic Car Museum in Norwich, New York
- Model R-1830 cut-away display at Arizona Commemorative Air Force Museum in Mesa, Arizona

== Specifications (R-1830-S1C-G) ==
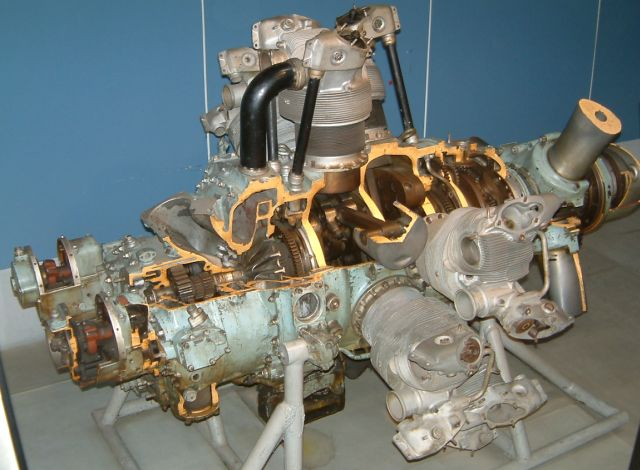
Pratt & Whitney R-1830 "Twin Wasp" (sectioned)

Data from

=== General characteristics ===
- Type: Fourteen-cylinder two-row supercharged air-cooled radial engine
- Bore: 5.5 in (139.7 mm)
- Stroke: 5.5 in (139.7 mm)
- Displacement: 1,829.4 cu in (29.978 L)
- Length: 59.06 in (1,500 mm)
- Diameter: 48.03 in (1,220 mm)
- Dry weight: 1,250 lb (570 kg)

=== Components ===
- Valvetrain: Two overhead valves per cylinder
- Supercharger: Single-speed General Electric centrifugal type supercharger, 1:7.15 speed increase
- Fuel system: Two-barrel Stromberg carburetor
- Fuel type: 95-100 octane rating gasoline
- Cooling system: Air-cooled
- Reduction gear: Epicyclic gearing, 3:2 (16:9 for many variants)

=== Performance ===
- Power output:
- 1,200 hp (890 kW) at 2,700 rpm for takeoff
- 700 hp (520 kW) at 2,325 rpm cruise power at 13,120 ft (4,000 m)
- Specific power: 0.66 hp/cu in (30.03 kW/L)
- Compression ratio: 6.7:1
- Specific fuel consumption: 0.49 lb/(hp•h) (295 g/(kW•h))
- Power-to-weight ratio: 0.96 hp/lb (1.58 kW/kg)

== See also ==
Related development

- Pratt & Whitney Wasp series
- Pratt & Whitney R-985 Wasp Junior
- Pratt & Whitney R-1340 Wasp
- Pratt & Whitney R-1535 Twin Wasp Junior
- Pratt & Whitney R-2000 Twin Wasp
- Pratt & Whitney R-2800 Double Wasp
- Pratt & Whitney R-4360 Wasp Major

Comparable engines

- BMW 801
- Bristol Taurus
- Fiat A.74
- Gnome-Rhône 14N
- Mitsubishi Kinsei
- Nakajima Sakae
- Piaggio P.XI
- Piaggio P.XIX
- Shvetsov ASh-82
- Tumansky M-88
- Wright R-1820

Related lists

- List of aircraft engines
