= North American NA-40 =

American prototype bomber aircraft

NA-40
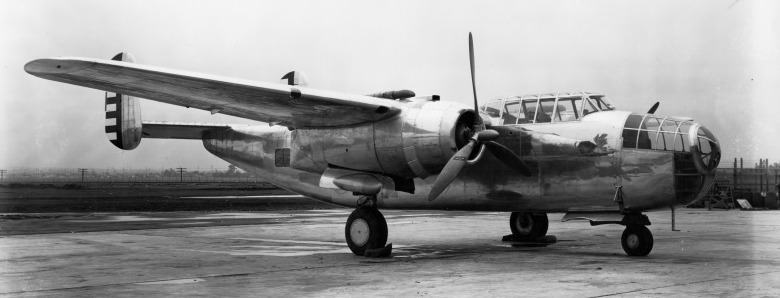

General information
- Type: Attack bomber
- National origin: United States
- Manufacturer: North American Aviation
- Primary user: United States Army Air Corps
- Number built: 1

History
- First flight: January 1939
- Developed from: North American XB-21
- Developed into: North American B-25 Mitchell

The North American NA-40 was an American prototype bomber aircraft developed by North American Aviation in the late 1930s for evaluation by the United States Army Air Corps. Although unsuccessful, it led directly to the North American B-25 Mitchell medium bomber.

== Design and development ==
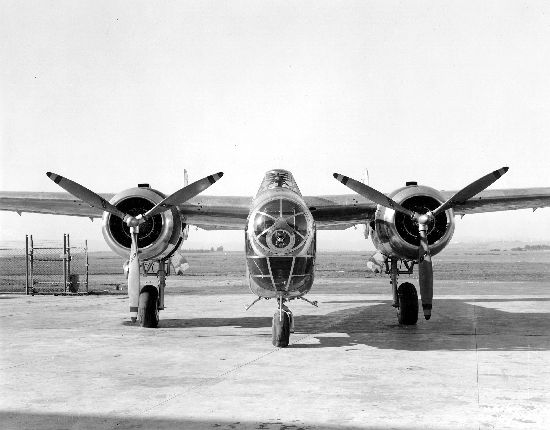
NA-40 prototype front view, showing constant dihedral wing discarded early in development of the successor B-25 design

The Air Corps issued a circular (number 38-385) in March 1938 describing the performance they required from the next bombers — a payload of 1,200 lb (540 kg) with a range of 1,200 mi (1,900 km) at more than 200 mph (320 km/h). Several American aircraft companies responded with submissions: Bell Model 9 with two engines, Boeing-Stearman Model X-100 with Pratt & Whitney R-2180 radials, Douglas Model 7B with Pratt & Whitney R-1830 Twin Wasp radials, Martin Model 167F and North American submitted their NA-40 design. The NA-40 had benefited from the North American XB-21 (NA-39) of 1936, which was the company's partly successful design for an earlier medium bomber that had been initially accepted and ordered, but then cancelled. However, the company's experience from the XB-21 contributed to the design and development of the NA-40. The single NA-40 built flew first at the end of January 1939. It went through several modifications to correct problems. These improvements included fitting 1,600 hp (1,193 kW) Wright R-2600 "Twin Cyclone" radial engines, in March 1939, which solved the lack of power.

In March 1939, North American delivered the substantially redesigned and improved NA-40 (as NA-40B) to the United States Army Air Corps for evaluation. It was in competition with other manufacturers' designs produced - the Bell had not been built - Douglas 7B, Stearman XA-21, and the Martin Model 167F but failed to win orders. The aircraft was originally intended to be an attack bomber for export to the United Kingdom and France, both of which had a pressing requirement for such aircraft in the early stages of World War II.

Despite the loss of the 7B in an accident injuring a French observer in January, the French had ordered the 7B and a revised version (as the DB-7). Unfortunately, the NA-40B was destroyed in a crash on 11 April 1939 while undergoing testing. Although the crash was not considered due to a fault with the aircraft design, the U.S. Army ordered the DB-7 as the A-20 Havoc.

The Air Corps issued a specification for a medium bomber in March 1939 that was capable of carrying a payload of 2,400 lb (1,100 kg) over 1,200 miles (1,900 km) at 300 mph (480 km/h) NAA used the NA-40B design to develop the NA-62, which competed for the medium bomber contract. No YB-25 was available for prototype service tests. In September 1939, the Air Corps ordered the NA-62 into production as the B-25, along with the other new Air Corps medium bomber, the Martin B-26 Marauder "off the drawing board".

== Variants ==
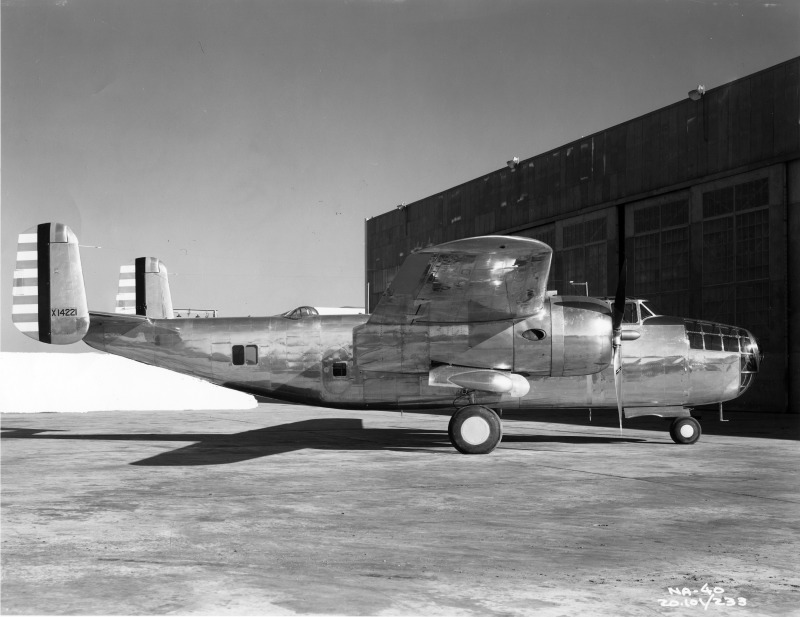
North American NA-40B prototype side

NA-40
A twin-engined, five-seat bomber to meet 1938 USAAF requirement for an attack bomber, it was powered by two 1,100 hp (820 kW) Pratt & Whitney R-1830-56C3G radials. Wingspan was 66 ft (20.12 m), and length 48 ft 3 in (14.71 m). First flown on 29 January 1939, it proved to be underpowered and unstable.
NA-40B
The NA-40B (also known as the NA-40-2) was a modification of the NA-40 prototype with two 1,600 hp (1,193 kW) Wright R-2600-A71-3 radials and numerous minor changes. It first flew in revised form on 1 March 1939, but crashed on 11 April 1940.
NA-40-3 through NA-40-7
Proposed export versions, not built.

== Specifications (NA-40B) ==
Data from Baugher

General characteristics

- Crew: 5
- Length: 47 ft 10 in (14.58 m)
- Wingspan: 66 ft (20 m)
- Wing area: 559 sq ft (51.9 m^{2})
- Empty weight: 13,961 lb (6,333 kg)
- Gross weight: 19,741 lb (8,954 kg)
- Powerplant: 2 × Wright R-2600-A71-3 Twin Cyclone 14-cylinder radial engines, 1600 hp (1193 kW) each at take-off power at sea level, and 1275 hp (951 kW) each at 12,000 ft (3.6 km)

Performance

- Maximum speed: 309 mph (497 km/h, 269 kn) at 14,000 ft (4,300 m)

Armament

- Guns: 3x 0.30 in (7.6 mm) flexible machine guns (nose, turret and ventral/waist)
- Bombs: designed for 2,100 lb (950 kg)

== See also ==
Related development

- North American XB-21
- North American B-25 Mitchell

Aircraft of comparable role, configuration, and era

- Douglas DB-7
- Martin Model 167F
- Stearman X-100

Related lists

- List of bomber aircraft
- List of military aircraft of the United States
