= Douglas A-20 Havoc =

American light bomber and attack aircraft of World War II

A-20 Havoc DB-7/Boston/P-70
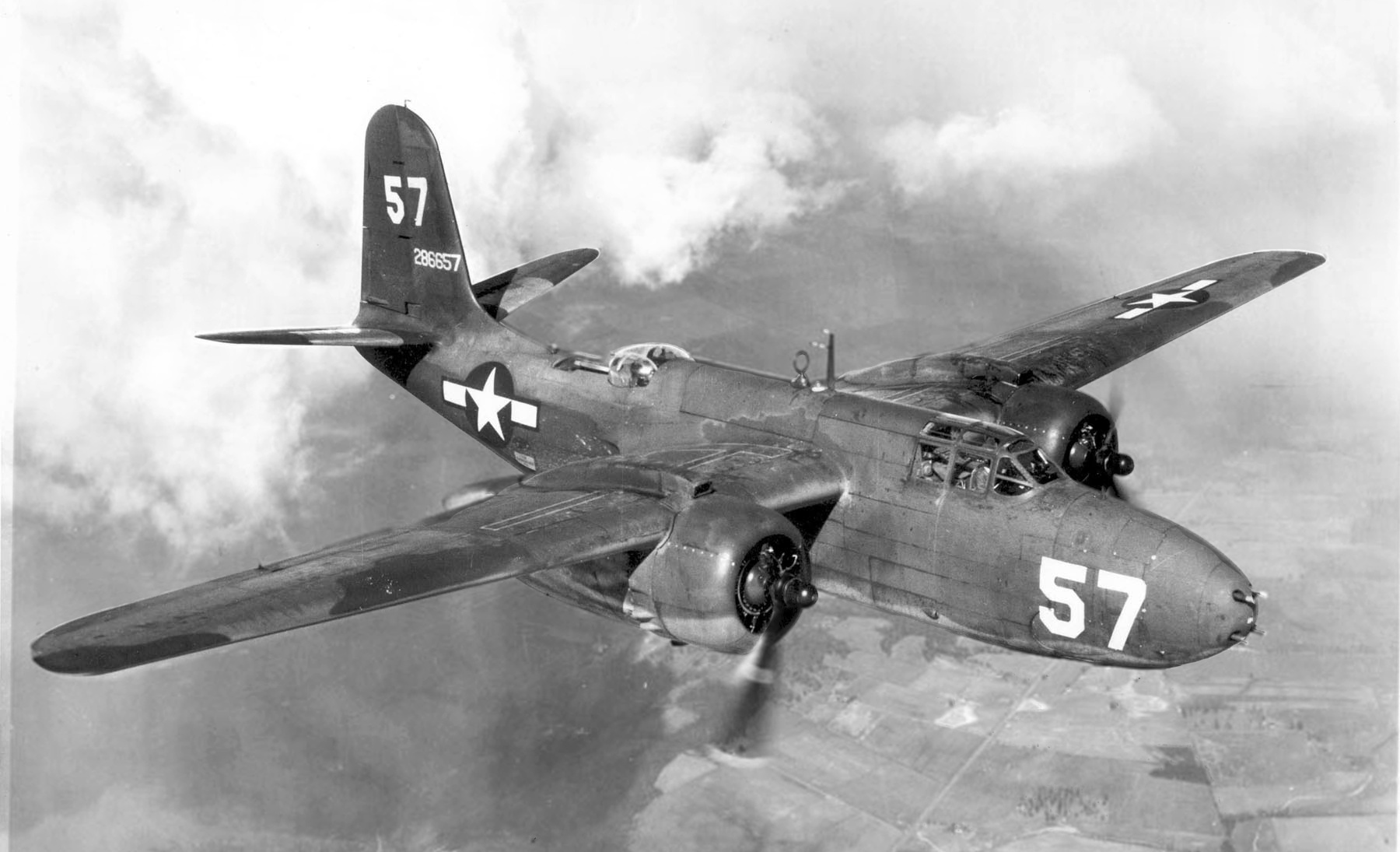
- A-20G of the United States Army Air Forces

General information
- Type: Medium bomber; Attack aircraft; Night fighter
- National origin: United States
- Manufacturer: Douglas Aircraft Company
- Primary users: United States Army Air Forces Soviet Air Force; Royal Air Force; French Air Force; South African Air Force
- Number built: 7,478

History
- Manufactured: 1939–1944
- Introduction date: 10 January 1941
- First flight: 26 October 1938
- Retired: (USAF) 1949

The Douglas A-20 Havoc (company designation DB-7) is an American light bomber, attack aircraft, night intruder, night fighter, and reconnaissance aircraft of World War II.

Designed to meet a U.S. Army Air Corps (USAAC) requirement for a bomber, it was ordered by France for its air force before the USAAC decided the aircraft would also meet its requirements. French DB-7s were the first to see combat; after the fall of France, the bomber served with the Royal Air Force under the service name Boston. From 1941, night-fighter and intruder versions were given the service name Havoc. In 1942, USAAF A-20s saw combat in North Africa.

It served with several Allied air forces, principally the United States Army Air Forces (USAAF), the Soviet Air Forces, Soviet Naval Aviation, and the Royal Air Force (RAF) of the United Kingdom. In total, 7,478 aircraft were built, of which more than a third served with Soviet units. It was also used by the air forces of Australia, South Africa, France, and the Netherlands during the war, and by Brazil afterwards.

In most British Commonwealth air forces, the bomber variants were known as Boston, while the night-fighter and intruder variants were named Havoc. The exception was the Royal Australian Air Force, which used the name Boston for all variants. The USAAF used the P-70 designation to refer to the night-fighter variants.

== Design and development ==
In March 1936, a design team headed by Donald Douglas, Jack Northrop, and Ed Heinemann produced a proposal for a bomber-reconnaissance aircraft powered by a pair of 450 hp (340 kW) Pratt & Whitney R-985 Wasp Junior 9-cylinder radial engines mounted on a shoulder wing. It was estimated to be capable of 250 mph (400 km/h) with a 680 lb (310 kg) bomb load. Reports of aircraft performance from the Spanish Civil War indicated that this design would be seriously underpowered, and it was canceled.

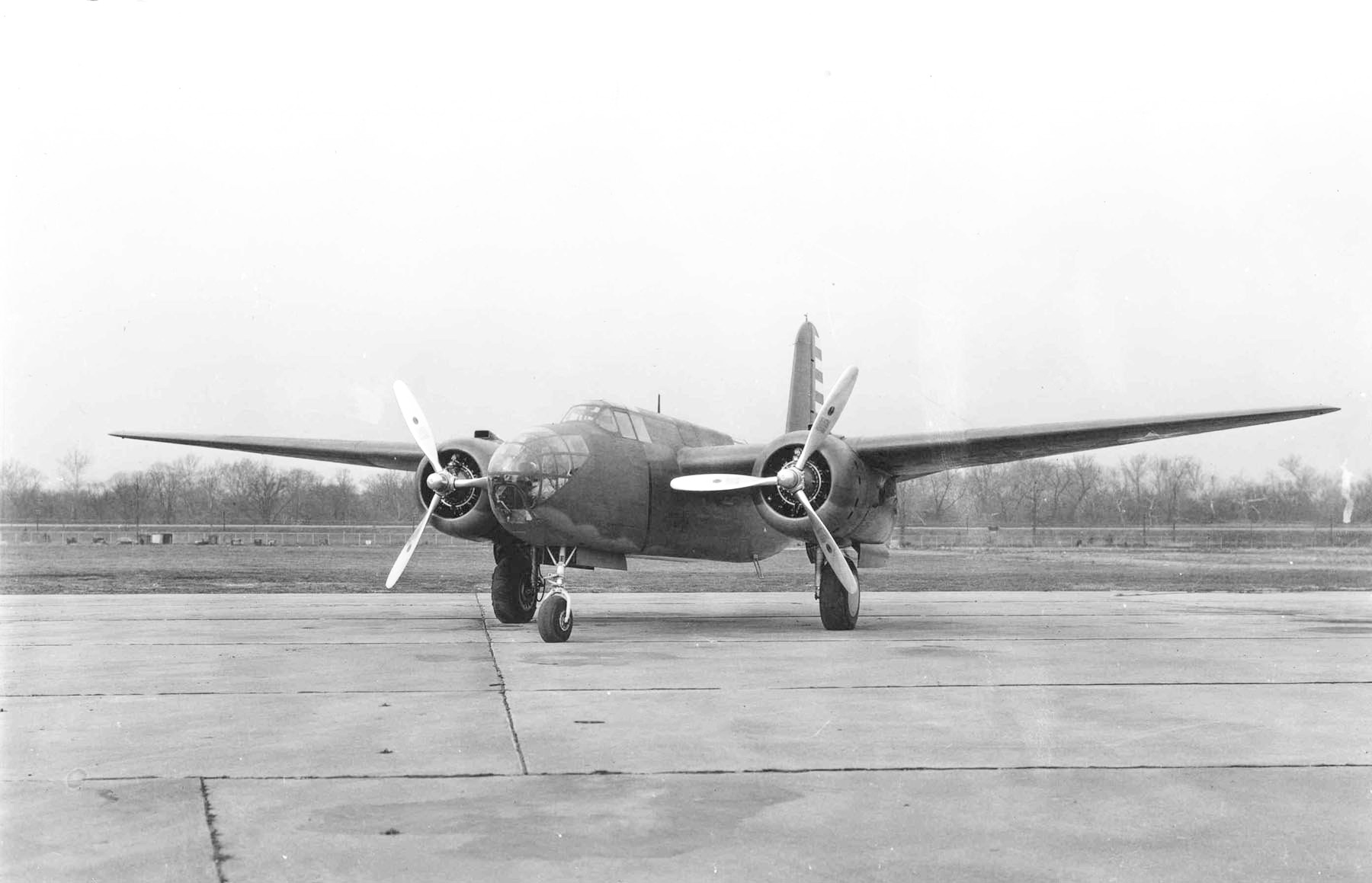
A-20A

In 1937, the USAAC issued a new specification for an attack aircraft. To meet this requirement, the Douglas team, now headed by Heinemann, developed the Model 7B, with a similar layout to the 7A, but was powered by 1,100 hp (820 kW) Pratt & Whitney R-1830-S3C3-G Twin Wasp 14-cylinder engines, and carried a bomb load of up to 2,000 lb (910 kg). It faced competition from the North American NA-40, Stearman X-100, Martin 167F, and an unbuilt design from Bell Aircraft, the Model 9. The Air Corps invited all five companies to build prototypes at their own expense and to submit sealed bids for production of their aircraft.

The prototype Model 7B made its first flight on 26 October 1938. The model attracted the attention of a French Purchasing Commission visiting the United States. The French discreetly participated in the flight trials, so as not to attract criticism from American isolationists. The Model 7B crashed on 23 January 1939 while demonstrating single-engine performance, killing the test pilot and seriously injuring a French observer aboard the aircraft. The presence of a foreigner on a test flight for an aircraft still under development caused a scandal in the press. Despite the crash, the French were impressed enough to place an order for 100 production aircraft on 15 February 1939, following this up with an order for 170 more in October 1939.

As a result of the French order, Heinemann carried out another major redesign of the aircraft. While the design's wings were largely unchanged, the revised design had a new, deeper but narrower fuselage, which accommodated a crew of three - a pilot, bombardier and gunner. The wing was mounted lower than on the Model 7B, while the engines, 1,000 hp (750 kW) R-1830-SC3-Gs, were mounted in nacelles slung under the wings. Normal bomb load was 1,410 lb (640 kg), or 1,800 lb (800 kg) in overload conditions, with a defensive armament of single 7.5mm MAC 1934 machine guns in dorsal and ventral mounts and four fixed forward-firing guns in the nose. The revised aircraft, the DB-7, first flew on 17 August 1939.

In 1939, the USAAC decided that the new bomber was best placed to meet its requirements for an attack bomber, which had been updated in 1938 from those that gave rise to the Model 7B, and in June 1939, it ordered 186 aircraft powered by Wright R-2600 Twin Cyclone engines, under the designations A-20 and A-20A (with the A-20s having 1,700 hp (1,300 kW) turbosupercharged R-2600-7 engines and the A-20As having 1,600 hp (1,200 kW) supercharged R-2600-3 or -11 engines). These had a larger vertical tail to cope with the increased power of the Wright engines, had a longer nose to give more room for the bombardier/navigator, and carried more fuel. R-2600 powered aircraft also proved popular for export, with France ordering 100 DB-7As powered by the R-2600 but with the short nose of the DB-7 in October 1939, and 480 long-nosed DB-73s, equivalent to the A-20A, in April 1940 and Britain ordering 300 DB-7Bs, again equivalent to the A-20A in February and April 1940.

In a report to the British Aeroplane and Armament Experimental Establishment at RAF Boscombe Down, test pilots summed it up as: "has no vices and is very easy to take off and land ... The aeroplane represents a definite advantage in the design of flying controls ... extremely pleasant to fly and manoeuvre." Ex-pilots often consider it their favorite aircraft of the war due to the ability to toss it around like a fighter. The Douglas bomber/night fighter was found to be extremely adaptable and found a role in every combat theater of the war, and excelled as a true "pilot's aeroplane".

When DB-7 series production finally ended on 20 September 1944, a total of 7,098 had been built by Douglas and a further 380 by Boeing. Douglas redesigned its Santa Monica plant to create a mechanized production line to produce A-20 Havocs. The assembly line was over a mile long (6,100 feet), but by looping back and forth, fitted into a building that was only 700 feet long. Man-hours were reduced by 50% for some operations, while production tripled.

== Operational history ==
=== France ===
The French order called for substantial modifications to meet French standards, resulting in the DB-7 (Douglas Bomber 7) variant. It had a narrower, deeper fuselage, 1,000 hp (750 kW) Pratt & Whitney R-1830-SC3-G radials, French-built guns, and metric instruments. Midway through the delivery phase, engines were switched to 1,100 hp (820 kW) Pratt & Whitney R-1830-S3C4-G. The French designation was DB-7 B-3 (the B-3 signifying "three-seat bomber").

DB-7s began to be delivered from Douglas's El Segundo, California, production line on 31 October 1939, and the passing of the "Cash and Carry" act on 4 November 1939 allowed the aircraft to be handed over in the United States to the French, who would then be responsible for delivering the aircraft. The DB-7s were shipped to Casablanca in French North Africa, where they were reassembled and tested before being handed over to operational units of the Armée de l'Air. When the Germans attacked France and the Low Countries on 10 May 1940, about 70 DB-7s had reached North Africa, equipping three escadrilles (squadrons), which were transferred from Africa to the French mainland in response to the German attack. They flew about 70 sorties against the advancing Germans during the Battle of France, with at least eight aircraft being lost, but before the armistice surviving aircraft were evacuated to North Africa to avoid capture. Here, they came under the control of the Vichy government and briefly engaged the Allies during Operation Torch, the Allied invasion of French North Africa in November 1942.

A Douglas Boston from the Lorraine squadron

After French forces in North Africa had joined the Allies, DB-7s were used as trainers and were replaced in front-line escadrilles with Martin B-26 Marauders. Free French squadron I/120 Lorraine, under RAF control, was based in England and re-equipped in 1943 with Boston IIIAs, later with Boston IVs. It was part of No. 2 Group RAF and then the Second Tactical Air Force and carried out numerous raids against targets in mainland Europe.

In late 1944 to early 1945, a few surviving ex-French DB-7s were moved to mainland France, where they saw action against the remaining isolated German pockets on the western coast.

=== British Empire ===
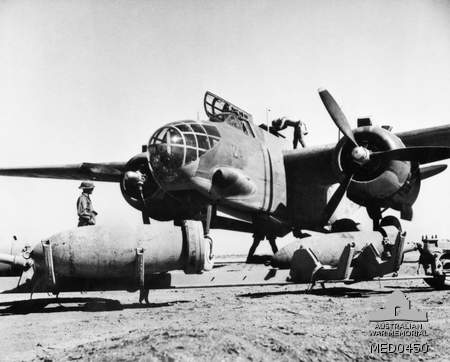
A Douglas Boston Mk III bomber of 24 Squadron, South African Air Force, in Libya during the Western Desert campaign in June 1942

After the Fall of France, a substantial number of DB-7s still had not yet been delivered to the Armée de l'Air. The remainder of the order, which was to have been delivered to France, was instead taken up by the UK via the British Purchasing Commission. In the course of the war, 24 squadrons operated the Boston in Britain, the Mediterranean, and North Africa.

The French had originally intended to use the DB-7 as a short-range, tactical-attack aircraft, but its range was too short for the RAF to be able to use it as a light bomber against German targets in Europe. The RAF was in desperate need of any aircraft suitable for night fighting and intruder duties. The type saw its first operations with the RAF in early 1941, when 181 Boston Mk IIs began to be flown as night fighters and intruders. The two basic versions of the Havoc I were an intruder version (glazed nose, five 0.30-inch machine guns and 2,400 pounds of bombs) and a night fighter version (AI Mk.IV radar and eight 0.30-inch machine guns).

Some Havocs were converted to Turbinlite aircraft, which replaced the nose position with a powerful searchlight. The Turbinlite aircraft could be brought onto a hostile aircraft by ground-control radar. The onboard radar operator then directed the pilot until he could illuminate the enemy. At that point, a Hawker Hurricane fighter accompanying the Turbinlite aircraft would make the attack. The Turbinlite squadrons were disbanded in early 1943.

All the French DB-7As, an improved DB-7 version, were delivered to the RAF, where they were given the name Havoc II and converted to night fighters. Eventually, the British Purchasing Commission ordered a British version as the DB-7B, and the RAF named it Boston III, which was the first to operate with the RAF as a light bomber. They were supplied to squadrons in the United Kingdom and Middle East (later moved to bases in Italy) replacing Bristol Blenheims. Their first raid took place in February 1942. Many Boston IIIs were modified to Turbinlite or intruder planes.

=== Soviet Union ===
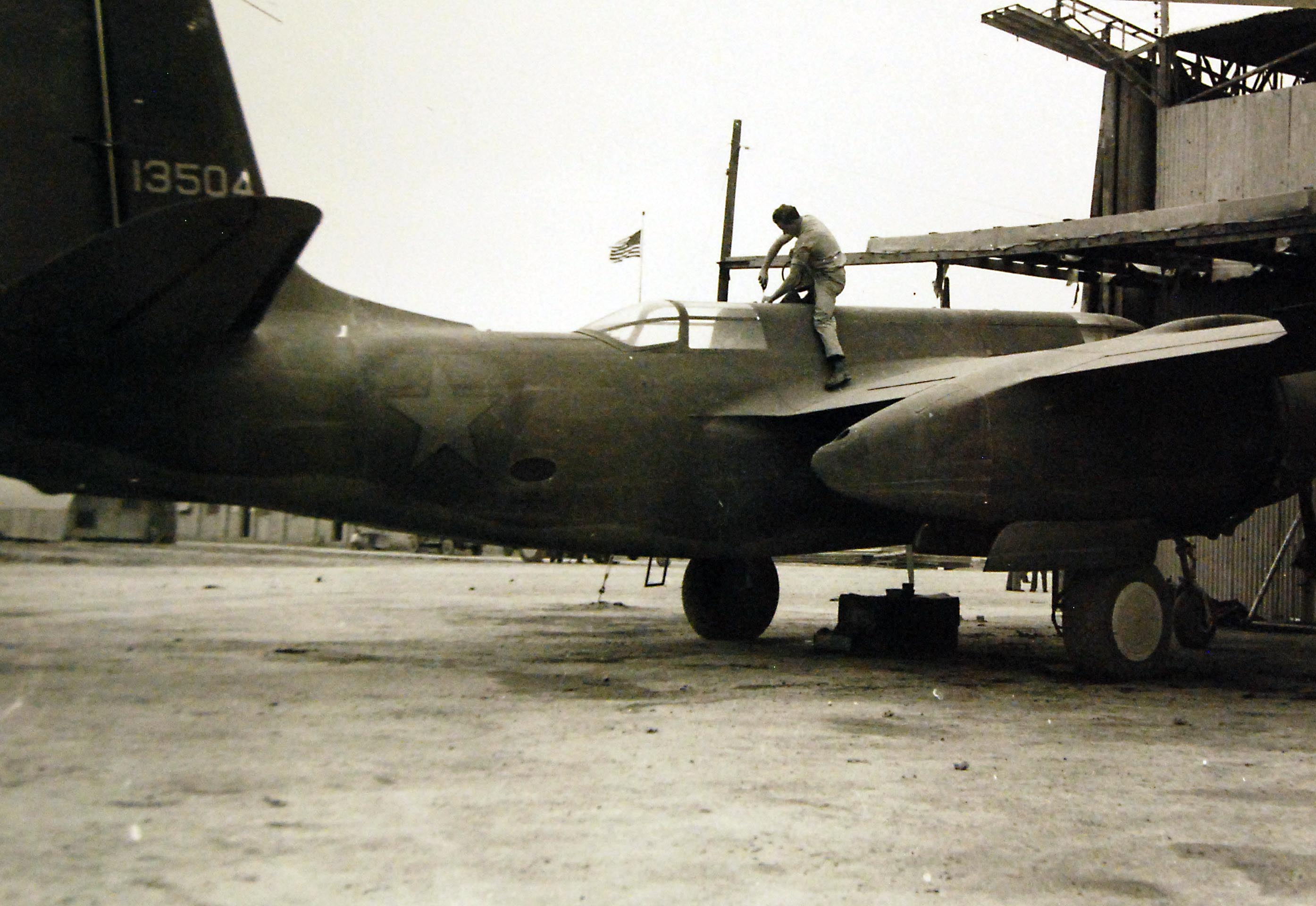
In Iran, an American mechanic completes maintenance on an A-20 before delivery to Soviet Union, 1943.

Through Lend-Lease, Soviet forces received more than two-thirds of the A-20B variant manufactured and a significant portion of G and H variants. The A-20 was the most numerous foreign aircraft in the Soviet bomber inventory. The Soviet Air Force had more A-20s than the USAAF.

They were delivered via the Alaska-Siberia (ALSIB) air ferry route. The aircraft had its baptism of fire at the end of June 1942. The Soviets were dissatisfied with the four .30-caliber Browning machine guns, capable of 600 rounds per gun per minute, and replaced them with the faster-firing, 7.62 mm (0.300 in) caliber ShKAS, capable of up to 1,800 rounds per gun per minute. During the summer of 1942, the Bostons flew ultralow-level raids against German convoys heavily protected by flak. Attacks were made from altitudes as low as 33 ft (10 m) and the air regiments suffered heavy losses.

By mid-1943, Soviet pilots were familiar with the A-20B and A-20C. The general opinion was that the aircraft was overpowered and therefore fast and agile. It could make steep turns of up to 65° of bank angle, while the tricycle landing gear made for easier take-offs and landings. The type could be flown even by crews with minimal training. The engines were reliable but sensitive to low temperatures, so the Soviet engineers developed special covers for keeping propeller hubs from freezing up.

Some of these aircraft were armed with fixed-forward cannons and found some success in the ground-attack role. By the end of the war, 3,414 A-20s had been delivered to the USSR, 2,771 of which were used by the Soviet Air Force.

=== Netherlands ===
In October 1941, the Netherlands government in exile ordered 48 DB-7C planes for use in the Dutch East Indies. Delivery had been scheduled for May 1942, but because of the desperate situation, the U.S. government agreed to divert 32 DB-7B Boston III aircraft to the Dutch East Indies in advance.

The first six were delivered by ship in February 1942. Only one aircraft was assembled in time to take part in the action. The Japanese captured the remaining aircraft of the delivery, and at least one was repaired and later tested by the Imperial Japanese Army.

=== Australia ===
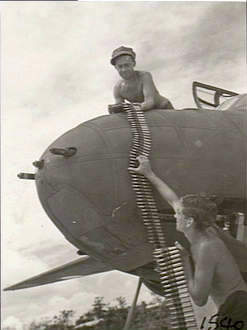
Loading .50-caliber ammunition onto a Boston of No. 22 Squadron RAAF at Noemfoor Island, Netherlands New Guinea, in August 1944

The next 22 DB-7Bs to be delivered to the East Indies were diverted to the Royal Australian Air Force. They served with No. 22 Squadron RAAF and fought in the East Indies from September 1942. RAAF Bostons took part in the Battle of the Bismarck Sea and in attacks on a large Japanese convoy headed toward Lae.

Some A-20A/C/G planes arrived from the U.S. from September 1943. By November 1944, No 22 Squadron was going to be assigned to the Philippines. Thirteen Bostons were destroyed on the ground during a Japanese raid on Morotai. The squadron was withdrawn to Noemfoor, where it was re-equipped with DAP Beaufighters before it returned to action. Surviving Bostons were relegated by the RAAF to transport, mail delivery, and communications.

=== United States ===
In 1940, the U.S. military's indifference to the type was overcome by improvements made for the French and British Commonwealth air forces.

The USAAC was impressed by the A-20A's high power-to-weight ratio and easy handling characteristics. Two variants were ordered, in a tranche of more than 200 aircraft - the A-20 for high-altitude daylight bombing and the A-20A for low- and medium-altitude missions. It was intended that the high-altitude variant would be fitted with turbosupercharged Wright R-2600-7 engines; after a prototype suffered technical problems, the USAAC changed its order and an initial shipment of 123 A-20As (with less-powerful R-2600-3 engines) and 20 A-20s (R-2600-11) entered service in early 1941. A further 59 aircraft from this first order were received as P-70 night fighters, with two-stage supercharged R-2600-11 engines.

The A-20B, another high-altitude bomber variant – lacking heavy armor and self-sealing fuel tanks – received a significant order from the USAAC: 999 aircraft (although two-thirds of these were exported to the USSR). With the lessons of the Pacific in mind USAAF ordered A-20Gs in June 1942.

==== Pacific ====
A major shipment of DB-73s originally destined for France was retained by the U.S. government and converted to the A-20C/G attack configuration. The USAAF received 356, most of which were operated by the 5th Air Force in the South West Pacific theater. When the war started, the 27th Bombardment Group (minus its A-20As) was being sent to the Philippines, where it was to have been re-established as an A-20 unit. The first operational unit in actual combat was the 89th Bombardment Squadron, which began operations in New Guinea on August 31, 1942.

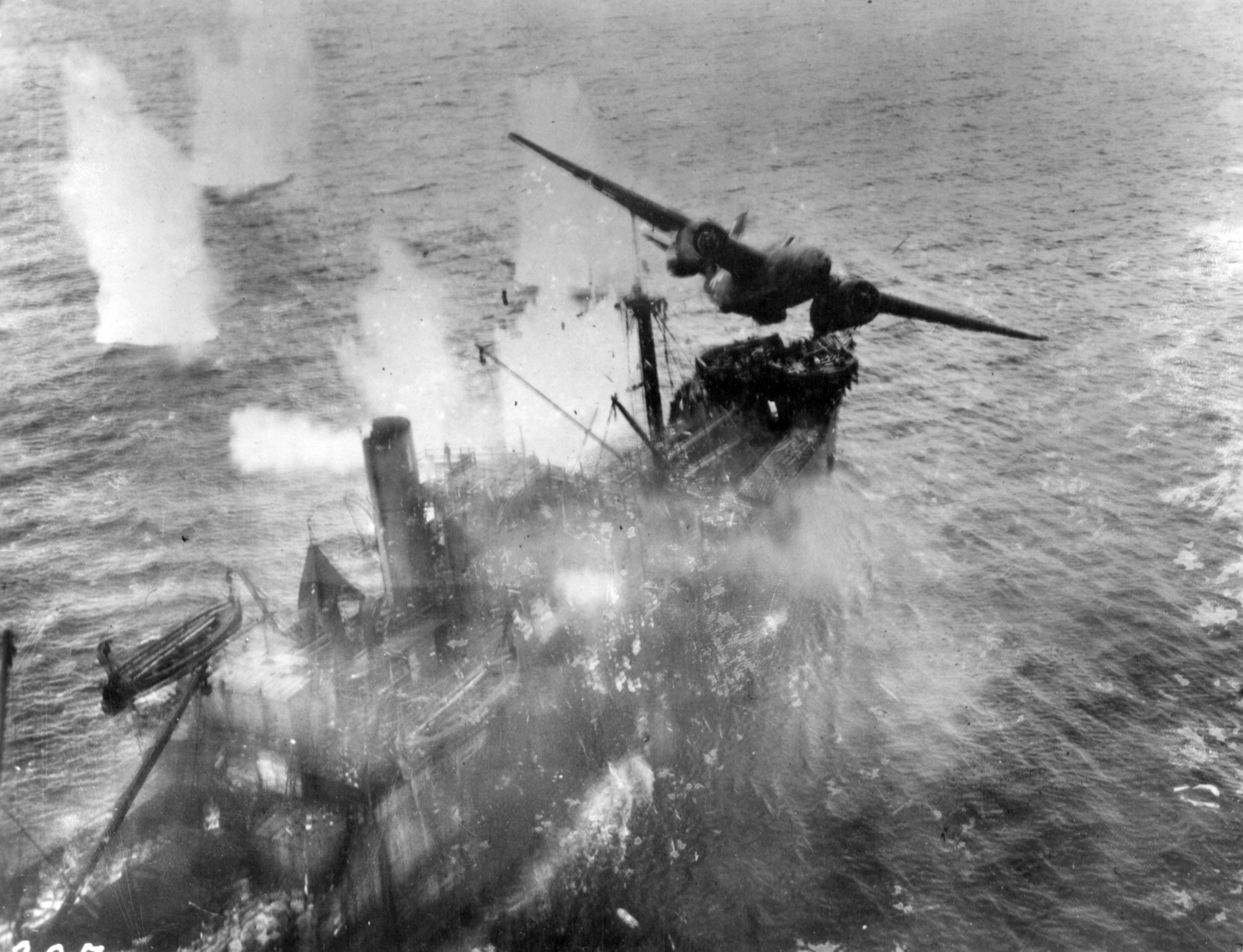
A USAAF A-20 Havoc of the 89th Squadron, 3rd Attack Group, skip-bombs a Japanese merchant ship off Wewak, New Guinea, in March 1944.

In early 1944, the 312th and 417th Bombardment Groups were sent to New Guinea, equipped with A-20Gs. Most sorties were flown at low altitudes, as Japanese flak was not as deadly as German flak, and pilots soon found little need for a bomb aimer. The aimer was subsequently replaced by additional machine guns mounted in a faired-over nose. The A-20G was an ideal weapon for pinpoint strikes against aircraft, hangars, and supply dumps. When operating in formation, their heavy forward firepower could overwhelm shipboard antiaircraft defenses and, at wave-top level (resembling a torpedo run), they could skip bombs into the sides of transports and destroyers with deadly effect. In addition, the captains of small Japanese escorts (destroyers, for example) assumed the approaching aircraft were making torpedo runs and turned their vessels bow-on to the aircraft in defense, making the strafing far more devastating to the unarmored escorts and often leaving them even more vulnerable to follow-up skip-bombing runs.

After the New Guinea campaign, the A-20s squadrons moved to the Philippines. In 1944, three full four-squadron A-20 groups were active in the campaign that led to the invasion of Luzon. After the Philippines were secured, A-20s attacked Japanese targets in Formosa.

The first night fighter squadron to use P-70s in combat was based at Henderson Field to intercept high-flying Japanese night raiders. The 418th and 421st Night Fighter Squadrons briefly flew P-70s in New Guinea. The P-70 scored only two kills during the Pacific war, as its performance was not good enough to intercept Japanese night raiders, and was replaced by the Northrop P-61 Black Widow as soon as possible.

==== Europe and Mediterranean ====
In Europe, USAAF A-20 crews flew their first combat missions attached to RAF units. On 4 July 1942, 12 crews from the 15th Bombardment Squadron became the first members of the 8th Air Force to enter combat. They flew Bostons belonging to No. 226 Squadron RAF from bases in England on missions against enemy airfields in the Netherlands.

USAAF A-20s were assigned to North Africa and flew their first combat mission from Youks-les-Bains, Algeria, in December 1942. They provided valuable tactical support to Allied ground troops, especially during and following the Battle of Kasserine Pass. During the North African campaign, many of the A-20s were fitted with additional forward-firing machine guns. Following the German surrender in Tunisia, the A-20s moved to bases in Italy, Corsica, France, and then back to Italy in January 1945.

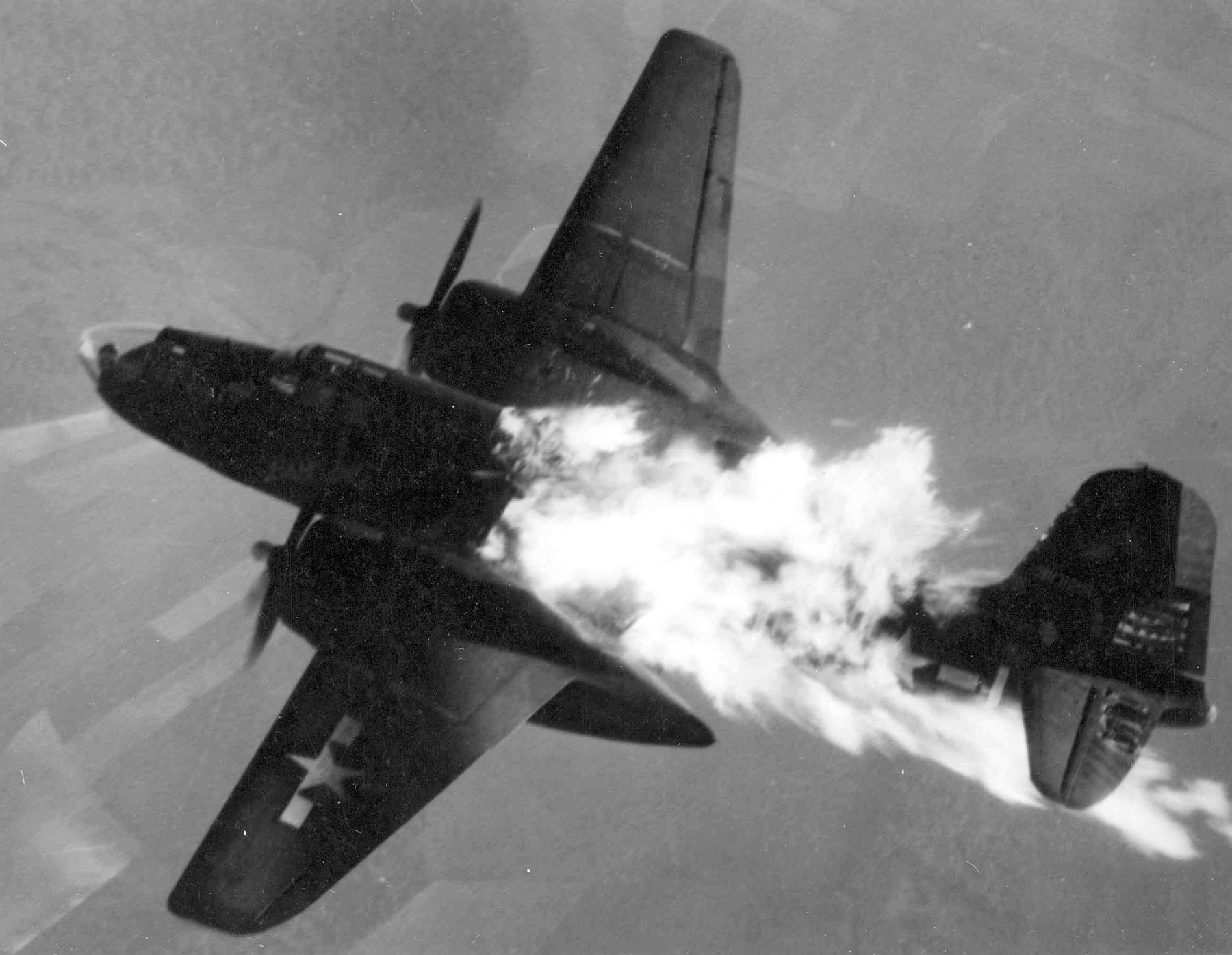
Douglas A-20J-10-DO, 43-10129, of the 416th Bomb Group, destroyed by flak over Beauvoir, France, on 12 May 1944.

Four USAAF night fighter squadrons were sent to North Africa in 1943. For a short time, these squadrons operated the Bristol Beaufighter, due to delays in the delivery of P-70s. No P-70s were operated out of bases on the European continent by the USAAF; while the 427th Night Fighter Squadron was deployed to Italy, the squadron had exchanged its P-70s for Northrop P-61 Black Widows by that time.

Meanwhile, in England, three A-20 equipped bombardment groups were assigned to the 9th Air Force and became operational in 1944. They started using the same low-level tactics that had been so successful in the Pacific, but due to heavy German flak, losses were too high and they switched to medium-level raids. After supporting advancing Allied forces into France until the end of 1944, all units were re-equipped with the Douglas A-26 Invader.

Reconnaissance Havocs joined the 9th Air Force in 1944. Its 155th Photographic Squadron (Night) was issued F-3As for night photographic operations.

== Variants ==
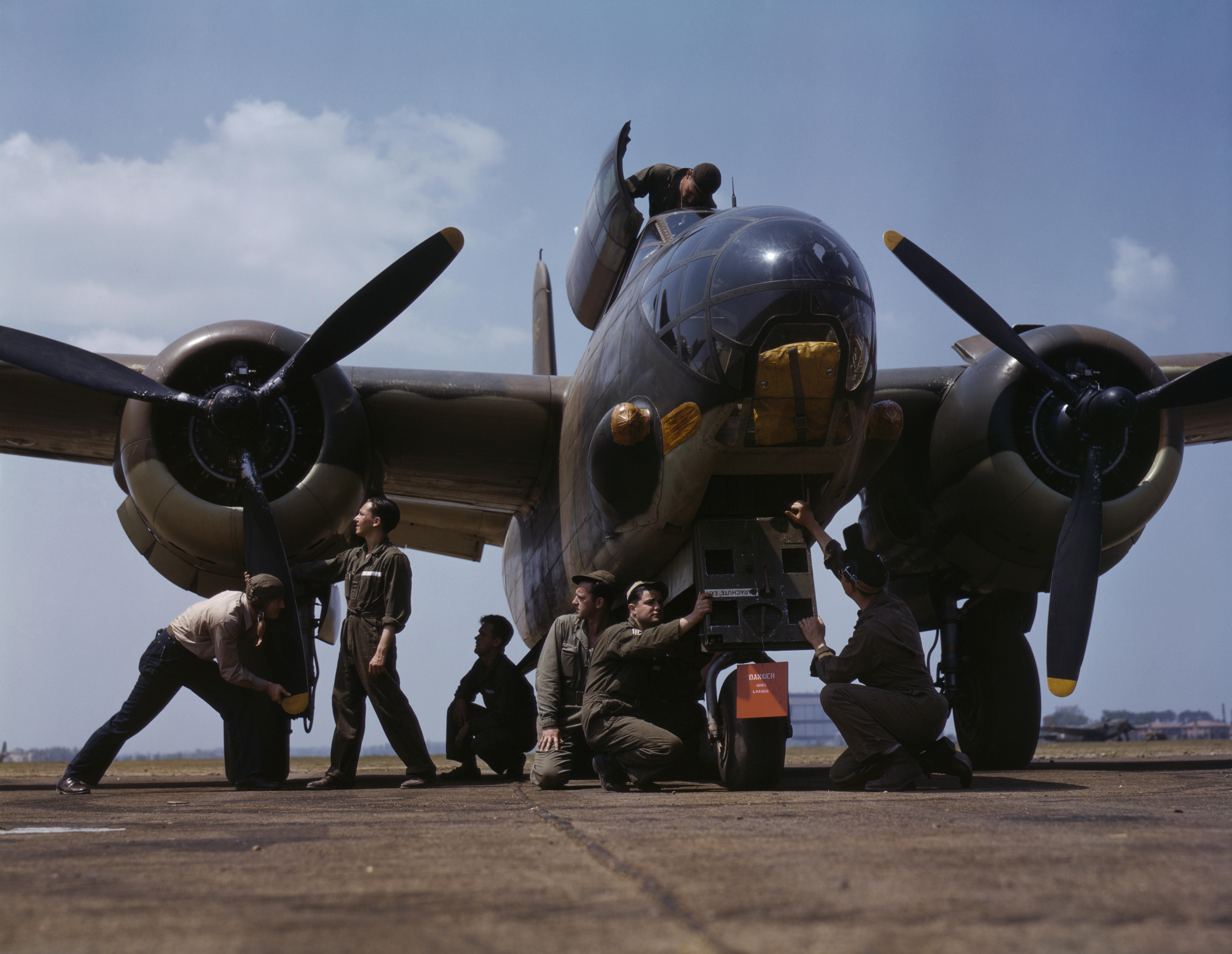
Servicing an A-20 bomber, Langley Field, Va., July 1942

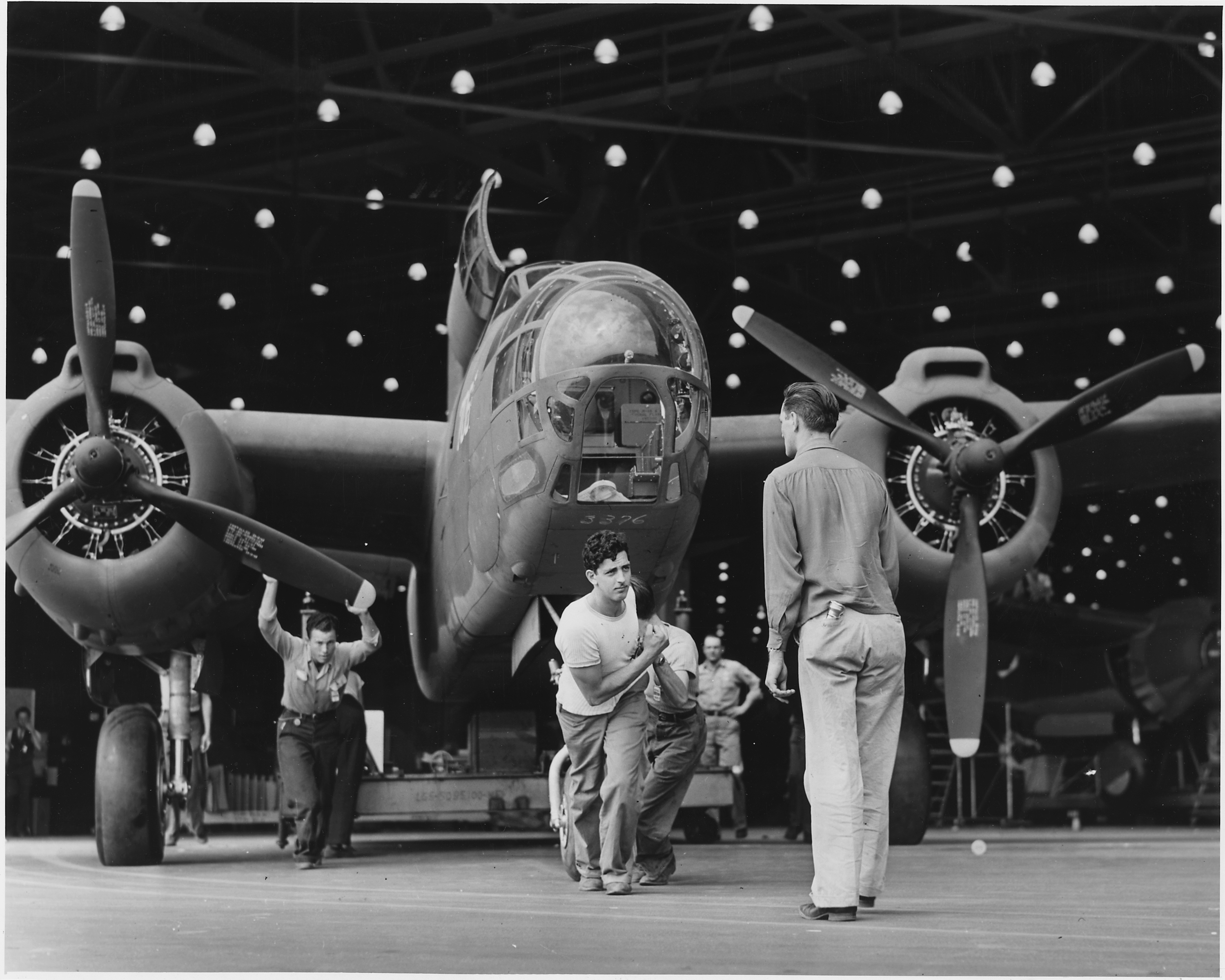
A-20 leaves the assembly line at Long Beach, 1942

Boston I & II
The Royal Air Force agreed to take up the balance of the French order which was diverted to the UK and the bombers were given the service name "Boston", with the further designation of "Mark I" or "Mark II" according to the earlier or later engine type.

Havoc Mk I
The Boston was generally considered unsuitable for use by the RAF since its range was too limited for daylight raids on Germany. Many of the Boston Mk II, plus some re-engined Mk Is, were converted for nighttime duties – either as intruders with 2,400 lb (1,100 kg) of bombs, or as night fighters with AI Mk. IV radar. These Havoc Mk I aircraft were found to be under-powered and were replaced by the de Havilland Mosquito. A total of 181 Bostons were converted to Havocs. In interdiction raids, Havoc intruders caused considerable damage to German targets.

Havoc-Pandora
Twenty Havocs were converted into "intruder" aircraft, carrying the Long Aerial Mine (LAM), an explosive charge trailed on a long cable in the path of enemy aircraft in the hope of scoring a hit. Trials conducted with a single Handley Page Harrow dropping LAMs into the stream of German bombers were not successful, and the Havocs were converted back to Mk I intruders.

Havoc I Turbinlite
Havoc I fitted with a 2.7 million candlepower searchlight in the nose; the batteries for it carried in the bomb bay. A radar operator sat in the after fuselage. They were unarmed, and they were supposed to illuminate targets for accompanying Hawker Hurricane fighters. A total of 31 aircraft were converted. They were made obsolete by high performance fighters that could carry their own radar.

DB-7/Havoc I
Initial French variant, fitted with two 1,000 hp (750 kW) Pratt & Whitney R-1830. Of the 270 DB-7s ordered 116 were accepted by the French before the armistice.

DB-7A/Havoc II
The French Purchasing Commission ordered 100 more bombers, to be fitted with 1,600 hp (1,200 kW) Wright R-2600-A5B Twin Cyclone engines, the same basic engine design as used by North American Aviation's contemporary B-25 medium bomber. These DB-7 aircraft were designated as the DB-7A by Douglas Aircraft. None of these were delivered before the fall of France and they were sent to the UK instead. These were converted into night fighters, by the addition of 12 0.303 inch machine guns in their noses and extra fuel tanks. They had a top speed of 344 mph (550 km/h) at higher altitudes. A total of 39 aircraft were used briefly as Turbinlites.

DB-7B/Boston III
The DB-7B was the first batch of this model to be ordered directly for the Royal Air Force. This was done in February 1940. These were powered by the same engines as the DB-7A, with better armor protection. Importantly, these had larger fuel tanks and they were suitable for use by the RAF as light bombers. This was the batch for which the name "Boston" was first assigned but since the DB-7s intended for France entered service in the RAF first, the aircraft in this order were called the Boston Mk III. Among other combat missions, they took part in the attacks on the German warships Scharnhorst, Gneisenau and Prinz Eugen during their dash through the English Channel (Operation Cerberus) and the raid on Dieppe ("Operation Jubilee"). Three hundred Boston III were produced and delivered and some of them were converted for use as night fighters.

DB-73
A variation on the DB-7B/Boston III built for a French government order and featuring French instruments and secondary equipment; of the 480 DB-73s ordered by France, 240 were built by under license by the Boeing Company in Seattle. None were delivered, due to the fall of France, the DB-73 block was ordered by the RAF, after conversion to the Boston III configuration. Following the German invasion of the Soviet Union, 151 DB-73s were provided to the USSR. Following the Japanese Attack on Pearl Harbor, a further 356 DB-73s were taken up by the USAAF, which transferred 22 to the Royal Australian Air Force (RAAF) for use in the South West Pacific theatre. Australian sources usually list these aircraft as DB-7B.

DB-7C
This was a Dutch Indies Air Force version intended for service in the Dutch East Indies, but the Japanese conquest of the East Indies was complete before they were delivered. Part of this order was stranded in Australia in the so-called "lost convoy", and the first 31 Bostons were assembled at Richmond Airbase in New South Wales and flown by No. 22 Squadron RAAF during the campaign against Buna, Gona, and Lae, New Guinea. The assembly of these 31 bombers was hampered by the fact that their manuals and instrument panels were printed in Dutch. The rest of this order were sent to the Soviet Union which received 3,125 of the Douglas DB-7 series.

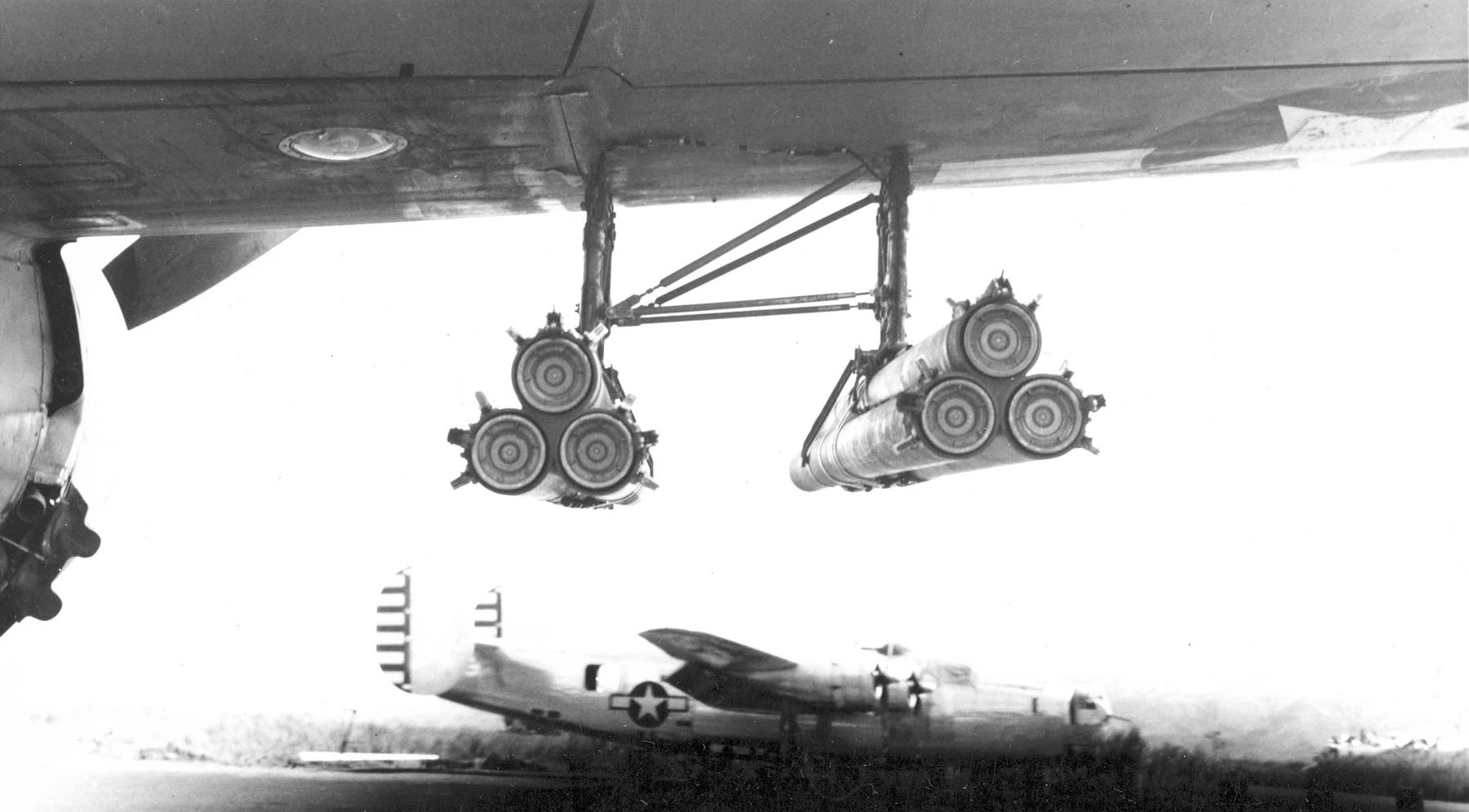
Dual-mount of T30/M10 triple launcher for M8 4.5 in (114 mm) rockets, which were also carried (one-only under each wing) by Republic P-47 Thunderbolts.

When shipments to the UK finally resumed, they were delivered under the terms of the Lend-Lease program. These aircraft were actually refitted A-20Cs known as the Boston IIIA.

A-20
The original American indifference to the Model 7B was overcome by the improvements made for the French and British, and the United States Army Air Corps ordered two models, the A-20 for high-altitude bombing and the A-20A for low and medium altitude combat. Both were similar to the DB-7B. The A-20 was to be fitted with turbosupercharged Wright R-2600-7 engines, but these were bulky and the prototype suffered cooling problems, so the remainder were completed with the two-stage supercharged R-2600-11, 59 as P-70 fighters and 3 as F-3 reconnaissance aircraft. One A-20 was evaluated by the U.S. Navy as the BD-1, while the U.S. Marine Corps flew eight as the BD-2.

A-20A
The U.S. Army ordered 123 A-20As with R-2600-3 engines, and 20 more with the more powerful R-2600-11. They entered service in the spring 1941. The Army liked the A-20A because of its good performance and because it had no adverse handling characteristics. Nine of them were transferred to the RAAF in 1943. The USAAF used the British name Havoc for the A-20A, while the RAAF referred to them as Bostons.

A-20B
The A-20B received the first significant order from the Army Air Corps: 999 aircraft. These resembled the DB-7A rather than the DB-7B, lacking self sealing fuel tanks, with light armor and stepped rather than slanted glazing in their noses. In practice, 665 of these were exported to the Soviet Union, so only about one third of them served with the USAAF.

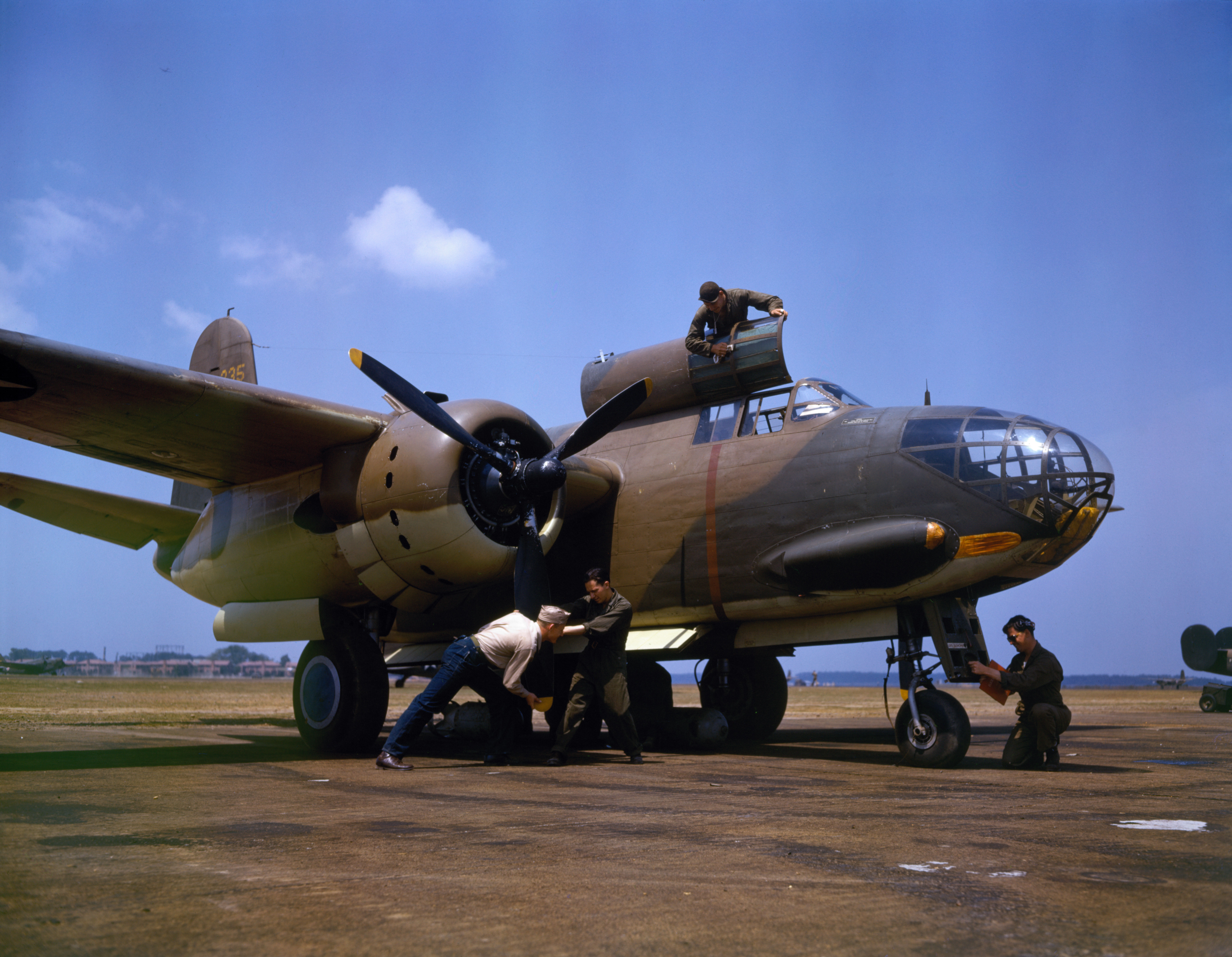
A-20C being serviced at Langley Field, Virginia, 1942.

A-20C
The A-20C was an attempt to develop a standard, international version of the DB-7/A-20/Boston, produced from 1941. It reverted to the slanting nose glass, and it had RF-2600-23 engines, self-sealing fuel tanks, and additional protective armor. These were equipped to carry an external 2,000 lb (910 kg) aerial torpedo. A total of 948 were built for Britain and the Soviet Union, but many were retained by the USAAF after the Japanese attack on Pearl Harbor. The Soviet A-20s were often fitted out with turrets of indigenous design.

A-20D
Proposed lightweight version with R-2600-7 engines and non-self-sealing fuel tanks. Unbuilt.

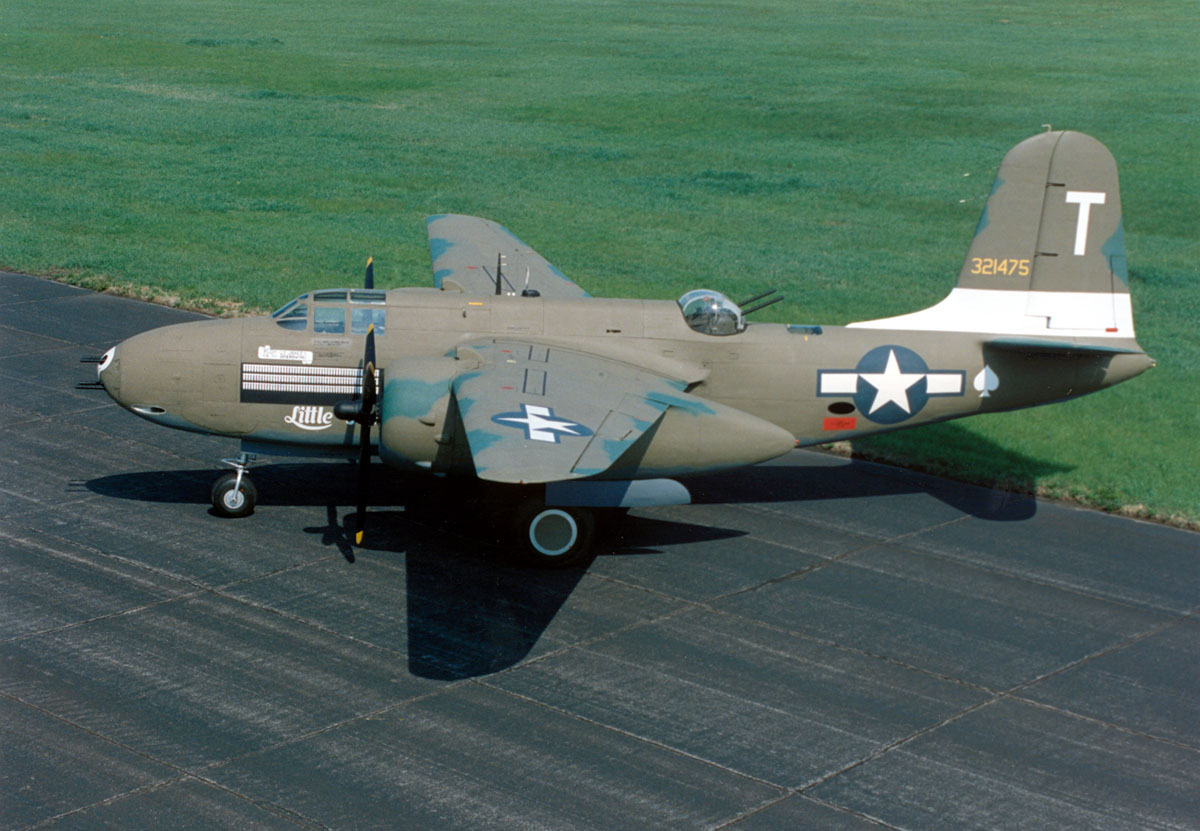
A-20G Havoc displayed at the National Museum of the U.S. Air Force.

A-20G
The A-20G, delivered from February 1943, would be the most produced A-20 variant, with 2,850 built. The glazed nose was replaced by a solid nose containing four 20 mm (.79 in) Hispano cannon and two .50 in M2 Browning machine guns. After the first batch of 250, the less-accurate cannon were replaced by more machine guns. After 750 aircraft had been built, a power-driven gun turret fitted with two .50 in machine guns was fitted, with the fuselage 6 inches (15 cm) wider as a result, and the ventral tunnel gun changed from a .30 in to another .50 in Browning. The powerplants were two 1,600 hp (1,200 kW) R-2600-23. Many A-20Gs were delivered to the Soviet Union. Notably, U.S. A-20Gs were used on low-level sorties in the New Guinea campaign.

A-20H
The A-20H was the same as A-20G, continued with the 1,700 hp (1,270 kW) R-2600-29. 412 of these were built. The takeoff weight was raised to 24,170 lb (10,960 kg).

ZB-20H
In 1948, the last surviving A-20H in United States service was redesignated "B-20" with the elimination of the "A for Attack" category, and was given the "Z" prefix as being obsolete.

A-20J/Boston IV
The A-20J carried an additional bombardier in an extended acrylic glass nose section. These were intended to lead bombing formations, with the following standard A-20s dropping their bombs when signaled by the leader. A total of 450 were built, 169 for the RAF which designated them Boston Mk IV from the summer of 1944 onwards.

A-20K/Boston V
The A-20K (Boston Mk V in RAF parlance) was the final production version of the A-20 series, the same as the A-20J except for R-2600-29s instead of -23s.

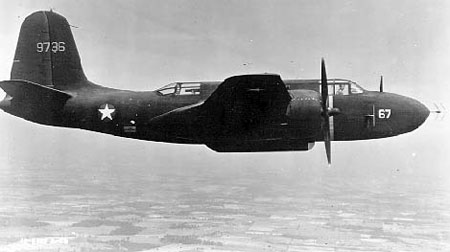
P-70 night fighter with "arrowhead" twin-dipole radar antenna

P-70
In October 1940, the USAAC felt a need for long-range fighters more than attack bombers. As a result, sixty of the production run of A-20s were converted to P-70 night fighters, all delivered by September 1942. They were equipped with SCR-540 radar (a copy of the British AI Mk IV), the glazed nose often being painted black to reduce glare and hide the details of the radar set, and had four 20 mm (.79 in) forward-firing cannon, each provided with 120 rounds, in a tray in the lower part of the bomb bay, while the upper part held an additional fuel tank with a capacity of 250 US gallons (950 L; 210 imp gal). In 1943, between June and October, 13 A-20Cs and 51 A-20Gs were converted to P-70A. Differences were to be found in the armament, with the 20mm cannon package replaced by an A-20G gun nose with six .50 caliber guns installed, the SCR-540 radar installation being carried in the bomb bay with the vertical-plane, twin-dipole "arrowhead" transceiving antenna protruding between the nose guns. Further P-70 variants were produced from A-20G and J variants. The singular airframe P-70B-1 (converted from an A-20G) and subsequent P-70B-2s (converted from A-20Gs and Js) had American centimetric radar (SCR-720 or SCR-729) fitted. The P-70s and P-70As saw combat only in the Pacific during World War II and only with the USAAF. The P-70B-1 and P-70B-2 aircraft never saw combat but served as night fighter aircrew trainers in the US in Florida and later in California. All P-70s were retired from service by 1945.

F-3A
The F-3A was a conversion of forty-six A-20J and K models for night-time photographic reconnaissance (F-3 were three conversions of the original A-20). This variant was employed in the European Theater by the 155th Photo Reconnaissance Squadron which began its deployment as the 423rd Night Fighter Squadron. The 423rd was converted to its photo mission as the 155th Photo Reconnaissance Squadron in part because of knowledge of night fighter tactics which could be used to defend against German aircraft. Although the armament was removed, the crew of three was retained, consisting of a pilot, observer, and navigator. The first Allied aircraft to land at Itazuke, Japan after the August 1945 surrender was an F-3A.

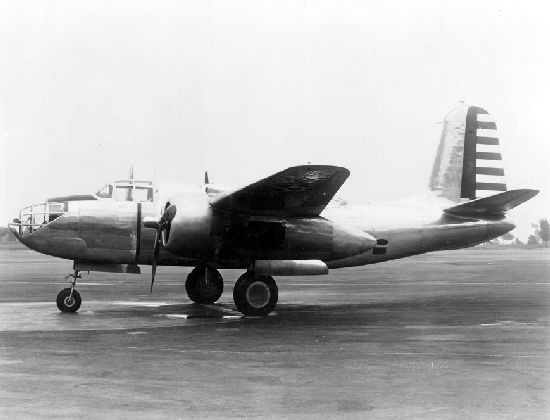
The BD-1 in 1940

BD-1
One A-20A was bought in 1940 by the United States Navy for evaluation for use by the United States Marine Corps. The Navy/Marine Corps did not have any priority on the production lines, so the BD was not put into service.

BD-2
In 1942, eight former Army A-20Bs were diverted to the United States Navy for use as high-speed target tugs. Despite the addition of the target-towing equipment and the removal of all armament and the provision to carry bombs, the aircraft were still designated BD in the Bomber sequence. They were withdrawn from service in 1946.

O-53
An observation/reconnaissance version of the A-20B powered by two 1,700 hp (1,300 kW) R-2600-7 engines. The original order for 1,489 aircraft was canceled and none were built.

== Operators ==
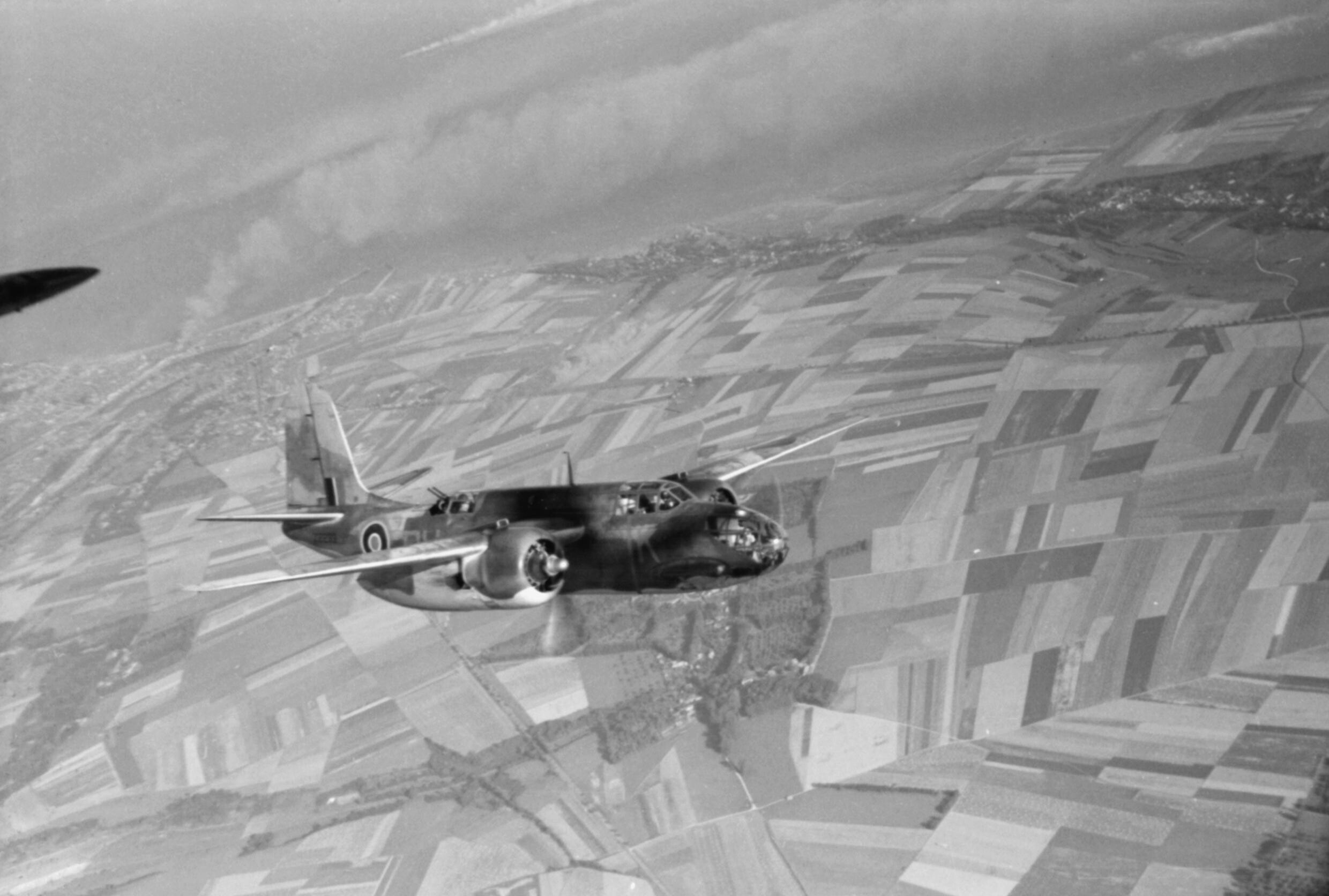
RAF Boston III from No. 88 Squadron RAF over Dieppe, 1942

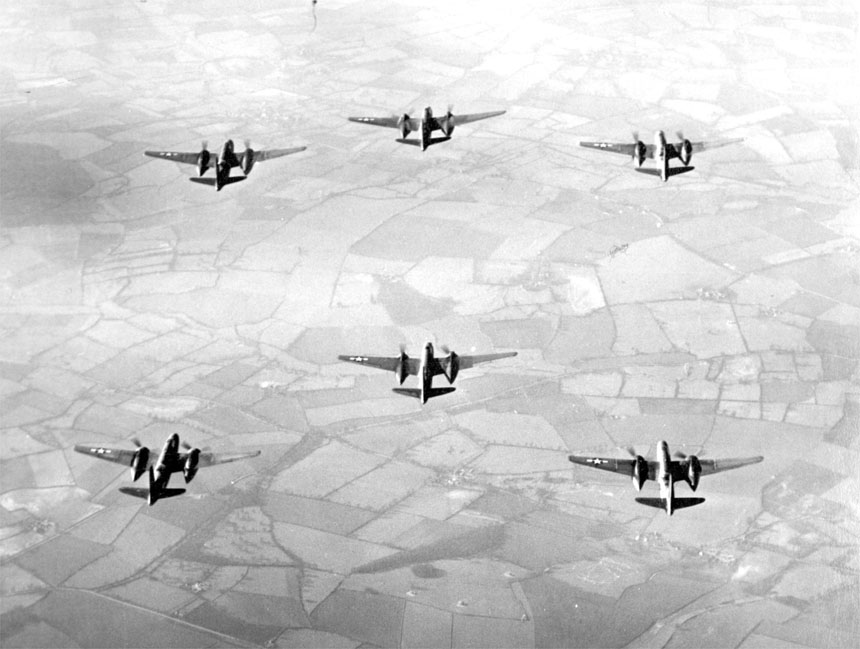
A-20s in bombing formation during World War II.

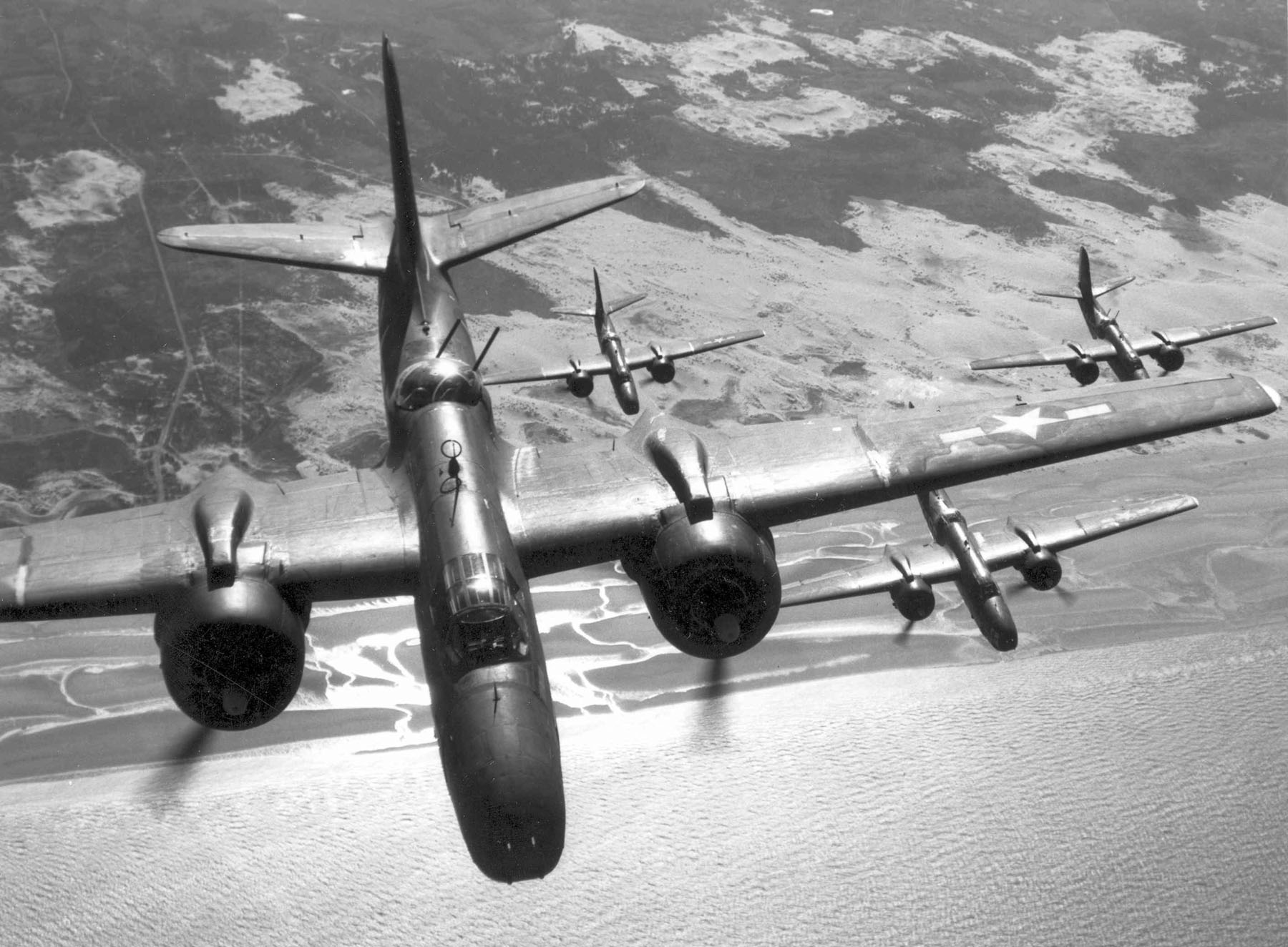
A flight of A-20G or H bombers over France

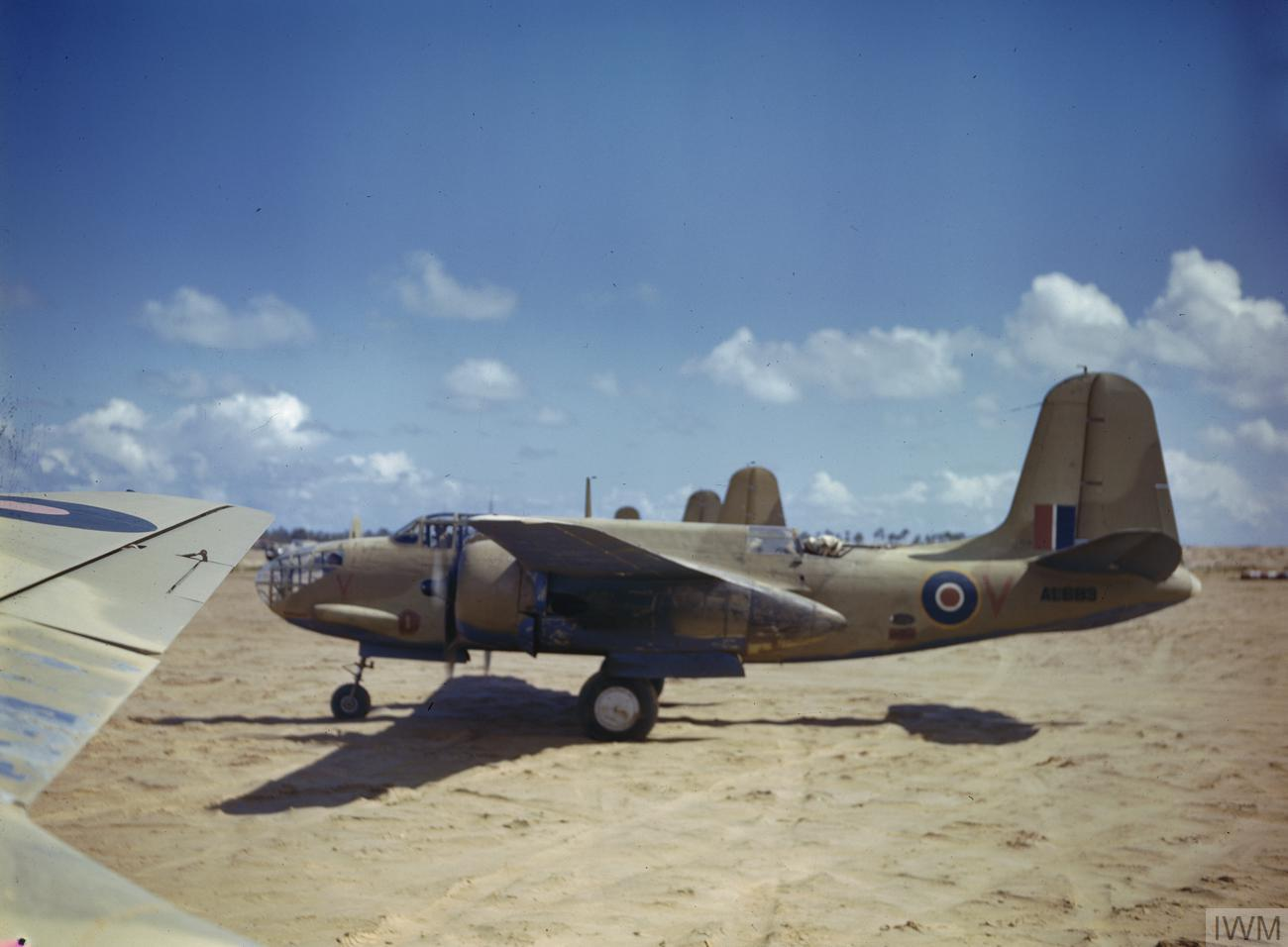
24 Squadron SAAF Boston Mk III North Africa 1941

Australia

- Royal Australian Air Force

Brazil

- Brazilian Air Force

Canada

- Royal Canadian Air Force

(French Fourth Republic) France

- French Air Force

Vichy France

- Vichy French Air Force

Netherlands

- Royal Netherlands East Indies Army Air Force

Poland

- Polish Air Forces in France and Great Britain

South Africa

- South African Air Force

USSR

- Soviet Air Force
- Soviet Naval Aviation

United Kingdom

- Royal Air Force

United States

- United States Army Air Corps
- United States Army Air Forces
- United States Marine Corps
- United States Navy

== Surviving aircraft ==
The last of the 7,478 A-20s/P-70s built (an A-20K) was completed in September 1944. The type was replaced in some air forces before the war's end, by types including the Douglas A-26 or Northrop P-61 (USAAF), Bristol/DAP Beaufighter (RAAF), and de Havilland Mosquito (RAF). Perhaps the last substantial user was the Força Aérea Brasileira, which retired the A-20 in the late 1950s. The number of airframes declined rapidly. By the early 1960s, only six complete A-20s existed, worldwide. That number has since grown slowly, with the discovery of crash sites in the Pacific and Eastern Europe.

== Specifications (A-20G-20-DO) ==
Douglas A-20 Havoc

Data from McDonnell Douglas aircraft since 1920 : Volume I, Jane's Fighting aircraft of World War II

General characteristics

- Crew: 3
- Length: 47 ft 11 7/8 in (14.63 m)
- Wingspan: 61 ft 3.5 in (18.68 m)
- Height: 18 ft 1 1/2 in (5.52 m)
- Wing area: 464 sq ft (43.1 m^{2})
- Airfoil: root: NACA 23018; tip: NACA 23009
- Empty weight: 16,031 lb (7,272 kg)
- Gross weight: 24,127 lb (10,944 kg)
- Fuel capacity: 400 US gal (330 imp gal; 1,500 L) normal capacity

300 US gal (250 imp gal; 1,100 L) in an optional external tank
676 US gal (563 imp gal; 2,560 L) in four optional auxiliary tanks in the bomb-bay

- Powerplant: 2 × Wright R-2600-23 Twin Cyclone 14-cylinder air-cooled radial piston engines, 1,600 hp (1,200 kW) each
- Propellers: 3-bladed Hamilton-Standard Hydromatic, 11 ft 3 in (3.43 m) diameter constant-speed fully-feathering propellers

Performance

- Maximum speed: 317 mph (510 km/h, 275 kn) at 10,700 ft (3,300 m)

325 mph (282 kn; 523 km/h) at 14,500 ft (4,400 m)

- Cruise speed: 280 mph (450 km/h, 240 kn) at 14,000 ft (4,300 m)
- Stall speed: 98 mph (158 km/h, 85 kn)
- Range: 945 mi (1,521 km, 821 nmi)
- Ferry range: 2,300 mi (3,700 km, 2,000 nmi)
- Service ceiling: 23,700 ft (7,200 m)
- Rate of climb: 2,000 ft/min (10 m/s)
- Time to altitude: 10,000 ft (3,000 m) in 8 minutes 48 seconds
- Wing loading: 52 lb/sq ft (250 kg/m^{2})
- Power/mass: 0.141 hp/lb (0.232 kW/kg)

Armament

- Guns:
  - 6 fixed forward firing 0.5 in (12.7 mm) Browning machine guns in the nose
  - 2 0.5 in (12.7 mm) Browning machine guns in dorsal turret
  - 1 flexible 0.5 in (12.7 mm) Browning machine gun, mounted behind bomb bay
- Rockets:
  - 4 triple tube T30/M10 rocket launchers
- Bombs: 4,000 lb (1,800 kg)

== Notable appearances in media ==
The Way to the Stars, also known as Johnny in the Clouds, is a 1945 war drama film that prominently features RAF Bostons. It was made by Two Cities Films and released by United Artists.

== See also ==
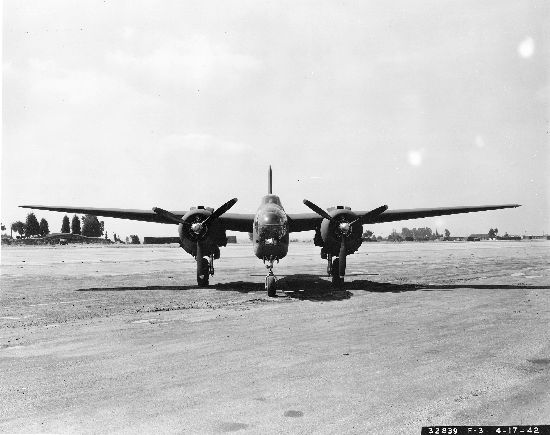
F-3, the photo reconnaissance version of the A-20 in 1942

Related development

- Douglas A-26 Invader
- Douglas DC-5

Aircraft of comparable role, configuration, and era

- Bloch MB.131
- Bristol Beaufighter
- Caproni Ca.314
- Dornier Do 215
- Fokker G.I
- Kawasaki Ki-48
- Martin Baltimore
- Martin Maryland
- Messerschmitt Bf 110
- Mitsubishi Ki-67
- Petlyakov Pe-2
- Petlyakov Pe-3

Related lists

- List of aircraft of the French Air Force during World War II
- List of aircraft of the Royal Air Force
- List of aircraft of the Royal Australian Air Force
- List of aircraft of World War II
- List of military aircraft of the Soviet Union and the CIS
- List of military aircraft of the United States
