= Martin Maryland =

1939 bomber aircraft family by the Glenn L. Martin Company

Model 167 Maryland
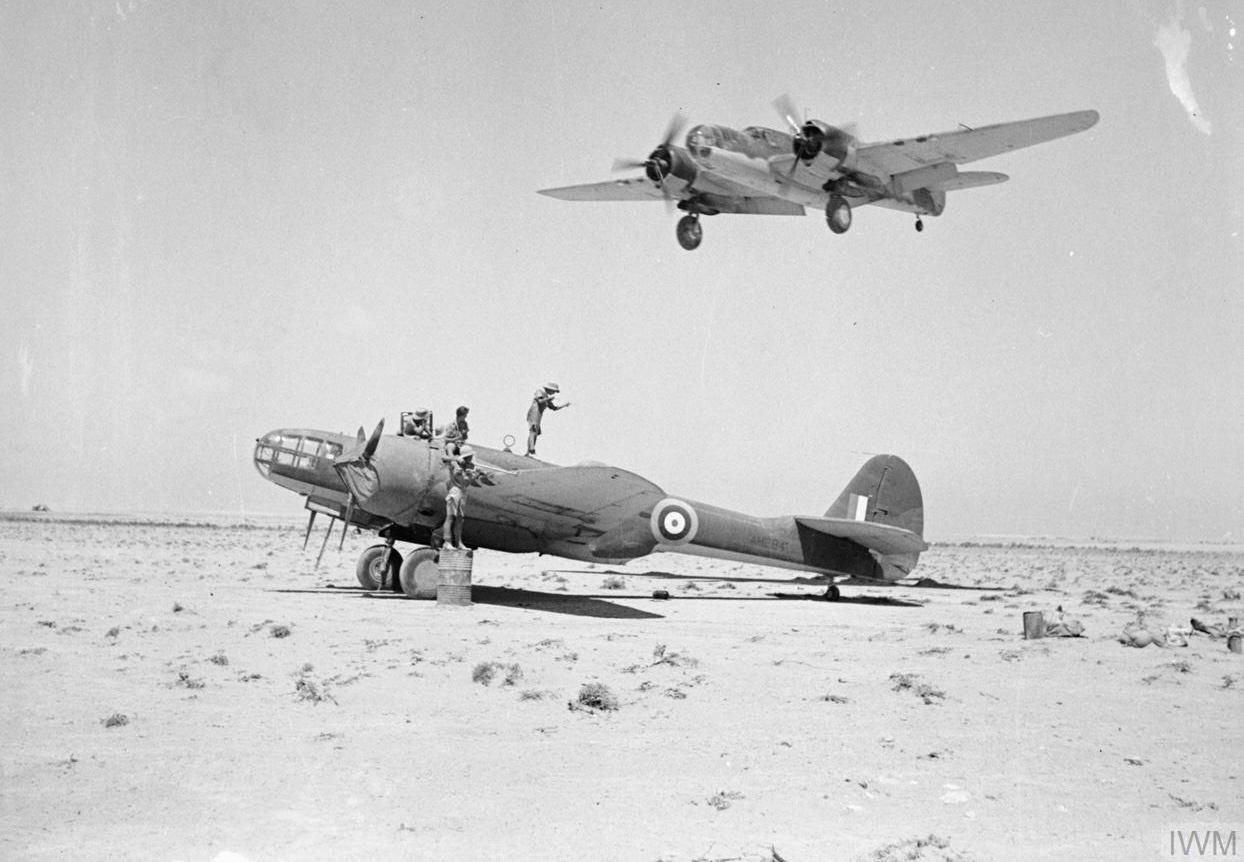
- RAF Marylands c. 1941

General information
- Type: Light bomber
- National origin: United States
- Manufacturer: Martin
- Primary users: Royal Air Force: South African Air Force; French Air Force; French Navy
- Number built: 450

History
- Introduction date: 1940
- First flight: 14 March 1939
- Retired: 1945
- Developed into: Martin Baltimore

The Martin Model 167 Maryland was an American light bomber that first flew in 1939. It saw action in World War II with France and the United Kingdom.

== Design and development ==
In response to a December 1937 United States Army Air Corps requirement for an attack aircraft capable of carrying a bombload of 1,200 lb (540 kg) over a range of 1,200 mi (1,000 nmi; 1,900 km) at a speed of 200 mph (170 kn; 320 km/h) (Note: All the competitors exceeded the speed requirement, with speeds ranging from 260 mph (230 kn; 420 km/h) to 310 mph (270 kn; 500 km/h).), the Glenn L. Martin Company produced its Model 167, which was given the official designation XA-22, competing with designs from Bell Aircraft (the Model 9), Douglas (the Douglas DB-7), North American (the NA-40) and Stearman (the Stearman XA-21). Martin's design was a twin-engine all-metal monoplane, capable of around 310 mph (500 km/h) with a crew of three. The XA-22 was not adopted for operational service in the United States, because the contract was won by the Douglas DB-7, which became the A-20 Havoc, but Martin received foreign orders, and about 450 of the fast, twin-engined bombers were built.

The prototype Model 167W was powered by twin-row Pratt & Whitney R-1830-37 Twin Wasp engines, which were replaced in French production aircraft by single-row nine-cylinder Wright R-1820 Cyclone engines, although the Twin Wasps were then restored for the British Maryland. All versions of the Model 167 were armed with six machine guns, four fixed guns in the wings (mainly for ground-attack), one dorsal gun and one ventral gun. In the prototype, these guns were all 0.30 in Browning machine guns. The dorsal gun was mounted in a fully retractable turret. The French aircraft used license-built Belgian Fabrique Nationale FN-Brownings, and used a lighter semi-retractable dorsal turret. The weight saved helped to increase the top speed to 288 mph (463 km/h).

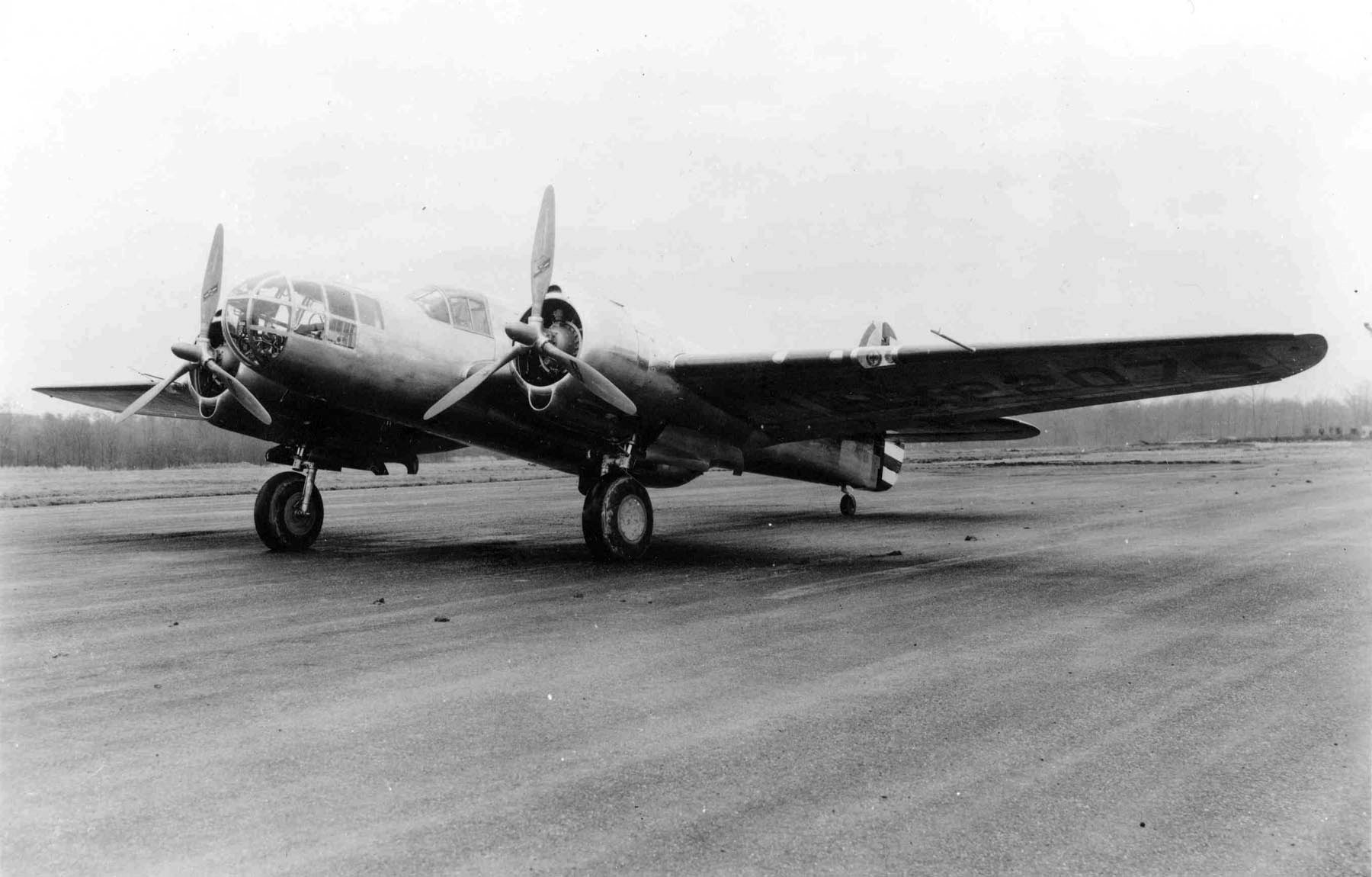
Martin XA-22, 13 April 1939

The Model 167 was a fairly typical twin-engined bomber of the period. The most unusual feature of the Model 167 was the very narrow fuselage, although it was shared with a number of late prewar contemporaries. The crew of three was carried in two isolated compartments: the bombardier sat in the nose below the pilot and the gunner was in the mid-upper twin-machine gun turret in a separate rear compartment, isolated by a bulkhead.

Glenn L. Martin doubled the size of the Baltimore factory, and built all 115 aircraft in six months, but they were prevented from delivering them by a US government arms embargo. Despite that, the French placed an order for an additional 100 aircraft. The embargo was lifted in October 1939, and the 115 aircraft from the first order were delivered by late November 1939. Deliveries then slowed, and only 25 of the second batch reached France before the French surrender to the Germans.

== Operational history ==
=== French service ===
French naval aviation Martin 167s

Facing a massive German arms buildup and desperate for modern aircraft, the French Air Force purchased U.S. aircraft of numerous types in the late 1930s. Martin received an order for more than 200 167 Fs which incorporated French equipment such as metric instruments. French officials expected deliveries to begin in January 1939 but the type, locally called the Glenn Martin 167 A-3 entered service only in early 1940.

Because of the U.S. embargo on arms exports after the beginning of the war, many aircraft were impounded for two months before being shipped to Europe. When the Battle of France began, there were only four Groupes de bombardement (bomber squadrons) equipped. The Glenns were quickly sent to the front lines where they performed well with their adequate speed and excellent manoeuvrability for an aircraft in this class. In about 400 sorties, they suffered a 4 per cent loss rate, much better than the 16 per cent endured by LeO 451 crews against similar targets.

Immediately before the June 1940 Armistice, units flying the Glenn Martin 167 were evacuated to French North Africa to avoid capture by the Germans. One of them landed in Spain and was interned, being tested by the Spanish Air Force. Some examples were transferred to the Aéronautique Navale. During Vichy rule of the French empire, French Martins bombed British Commonwealth forces, most notably during the Syria–Lebanon campaign of 1941. Following Operation Torch in 1943, M.167s were replaced with more modern Allied types, including the Martin B-26 Marauder. Approximately 215 Martin 167s were delivered to France.

=== British service ===
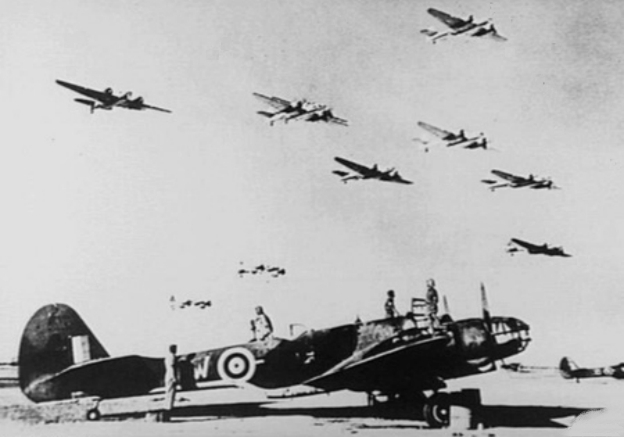
Martin Maryland bombers fly past in formation, North Africa 1941

Just before the Franco-German Armistice, the remaining 75 aircraft on the French order were signed over to the United Kingdom; 32 Marylands had been completed to French specifications and were converted to British requirements in the UK. Engines were changed from the Cyclone 9 to the Pratt and Whitney Twin Wasp and various weapons and instruments were replaced. The last 43 of the order were completed as required by Glenn Martin. All these aircraft became the Maryland Mk.I. A further 150 aircraft had been ordered directly by Britain with two-speed superchargers on their Twin Wasps as the Maryland Mk.II.

Many of the aircraft were shipped to Egypt and Malta in time for the 1941 fighting there. The RAF used the aircraft mainly for photo-reconnaissance operations in North and East Africa, it being faster than the Bristol Blenheim. A Maryland bomber piloted by Adrian Warburton, photographed the Italian fleet before and after the Battle of Taranto on 11 November 1940. Warburton, scored five confirmed kills with the Maryland's forward-firing guns, making him the type's only ace of the war.

Seven Maryland Mk.Is were transferred to the British Fleet Air Arm and were mainly used for target towing duties. On 22 May 1941, a Maryland of 771 Naval Air Squadron based at Hatston in the Orkney Islands, reported that the German battleship Bismarck had left Bergen, confirming that she was breaking out into the Atlantic.

== Operators ==
France

- Armée de l'Air
- Aéronavale
- Free French Air Force

Vichy France

- Vichy French Air Force

South Africa

- South African Air Force
  - No. 12 Squadron SAAF
  - No. 16 Squadron SAAF
  - No. 21 Squadron SAAF
  - No. 24 Squadron SAAF

United Kingdom

- Royal Air Force
  - No. 39 Squadron RAF
  - No. 69 Squadron RAF
  - No. 203 Squadron RAF
  - No. 223 Squadron RAF
- Fleet Air Arm
  - 771 Naval Air Squadron

== Specifications (Maryland Mk I) ==
Data from

General characteristics

- Crew: three (pilot, navigator/bomb aimer/gunner, and radio operator/gunner)
- Length: 46 ft 8 in (14.2 m)
- Wingspan: 61 ft 4 in (18.7 m)
- Height: 16 ft 3 in (5.0 m)
- Wing area: 537 sq ft (49.9 m^{2})
- Empty weight: 10,586 lb (4,802 kg)
- Gross weight: 15,297 lb (6,939 kg)
- Max takeoff weight: 16,809 lb (7,624 kg)
- Fuel capacity: 514 imp gal (2,340 L)
- Powerplant: 2 × Pratt & Whitney R-1830-S1C3-G Twin Wasp radial engines, 1,050 hp (780 kW) each
- Propellers: 3-bladed Hamilton Standard 3T50 constant-speed metal propellers, 10 ft 11 in (3.3 m) diameter

Performance

- Maximum speed: 304 mph (489 km/h, 264 kn) at 13,000 ft (4,000 m)
- Cruise speed: 248 mph (399 km/h, 216 kn)
- Range: 1,300 mi (2,100 km, 1,100 nmi)
- Service ceiling: 29,500 ft (9,000 m)
- Rate of climb: 2,400 ft/min (12 m/s)
- Wing loading: 28.5 lb/sq ft (139.1 kg/m^{2})
- Power/mass: 0.157 hp/lb (259 W/kg)

Armament

- Guns:
  - 4 × .303 in Browning Mk II machine guns in outer wings with 750 rpg
  - 1 × .303 in Vickers K machine gun in a dorsal step position with 5 × 97-round magazines
  - 1 × .303 in Vickers K machine gun in a ventral step position with 5 × 97-round magazines
- Bombs: 2,000 lb (907 kg) internally; (usually 4 × 500 lb (227 kg) bombs)

== See also ==
Related development

- Martin Baltimore

Aircraft of comparable role, configuration, and era

- Bristol Blenheim
- Dornier Do 17
- Kawasaki Ki-48
- PZL.37 Łoś
- Tupolev SB

Related lists

- List of aircraft of World War II
- List of aircraft of the Royal Air Force
- List of aircraft of the French Air Force during World War II
- List of military aircraft of the United States

== Bibliography ==
- Bishop, Chris. The Encyclopedia of 20th Century Air Warfare. London: Amber Books Ltd, 2004. ISBN 1-904687-26-1.
- Cuny, Jean. "Glenn Martin 167 in French Service". Journal of American Aviation Historical Society. Volume 10, No. 1, Spring 1965.
- Cuny, Jean & Danel, Raymond (May 1983). "Les "Glenn" de la Marine nationale: Le Glenn Martin 167" [The "Glenns" of the French Navy: The Glenn Martin 167]. Le Fana de l'Aviation (in French) (162): 30–37. ISSN 0757-4169.
- Dorr, Robert F (1996). "North American B-25 Variant Briefing". Wings of Fame. Vol. 3. London: Aerospace Publishing. pp. 118–141. ISBN 1-874023-70-0. ISSN 1361-2034.
- Francillon, René J (December 1982). "Le Martin XA-22: La Genese des "Glenn"". Le fanatique de l'Aviation (in French). No. 157. pp. 4–11. ISSN 0337-8861.
- Lawrence, Joseph (1945). The Observer's Book Of Airplanes. London and New York: Frederick Warne & Co.
- Mondey, David. American Aircraft of World War II (Hamlyn Concise Guide). London: Bounty Books, 2006. ISBN 978-0-7537-1461-4.
- Munson, Kenneth. Fighters and Bombers of World War II: 1939–45. London: Blandford Press Ltd, 1969. ISBN 0-9637110-4-0.
- Shores, Christopher F. (1971). Martin Maryland and Baltimore Variants. Aircraft in Profile. Vol. XI. Windsor: Profile Publications. pp. 217–230. OCLC 223756773.
- Sturtivant, Ray; Ballance, Theo (1994). The Squadrons of the Fleet Air Arm. Tonbridge: Air Britain (Historians) Ltd. ISBN 0-85130-223-8.
- Sturtivant, Ray; Burrow, Mick (1995). Fleet Air Arm Aircraft 1939 to 1945. Tunbridge Wells: Air Britain (Historians) Ltd. ISBN 0-85130-232-7.
- Wagner, Ray. "American Combat Planes, Third Enlarged Edition". New York: Doubleday & Company, 1982, pp. 178–179. ISBN 978-0-3851-3120-9.
