= North American XB-21 =

American medium bomber prototype

XB-21
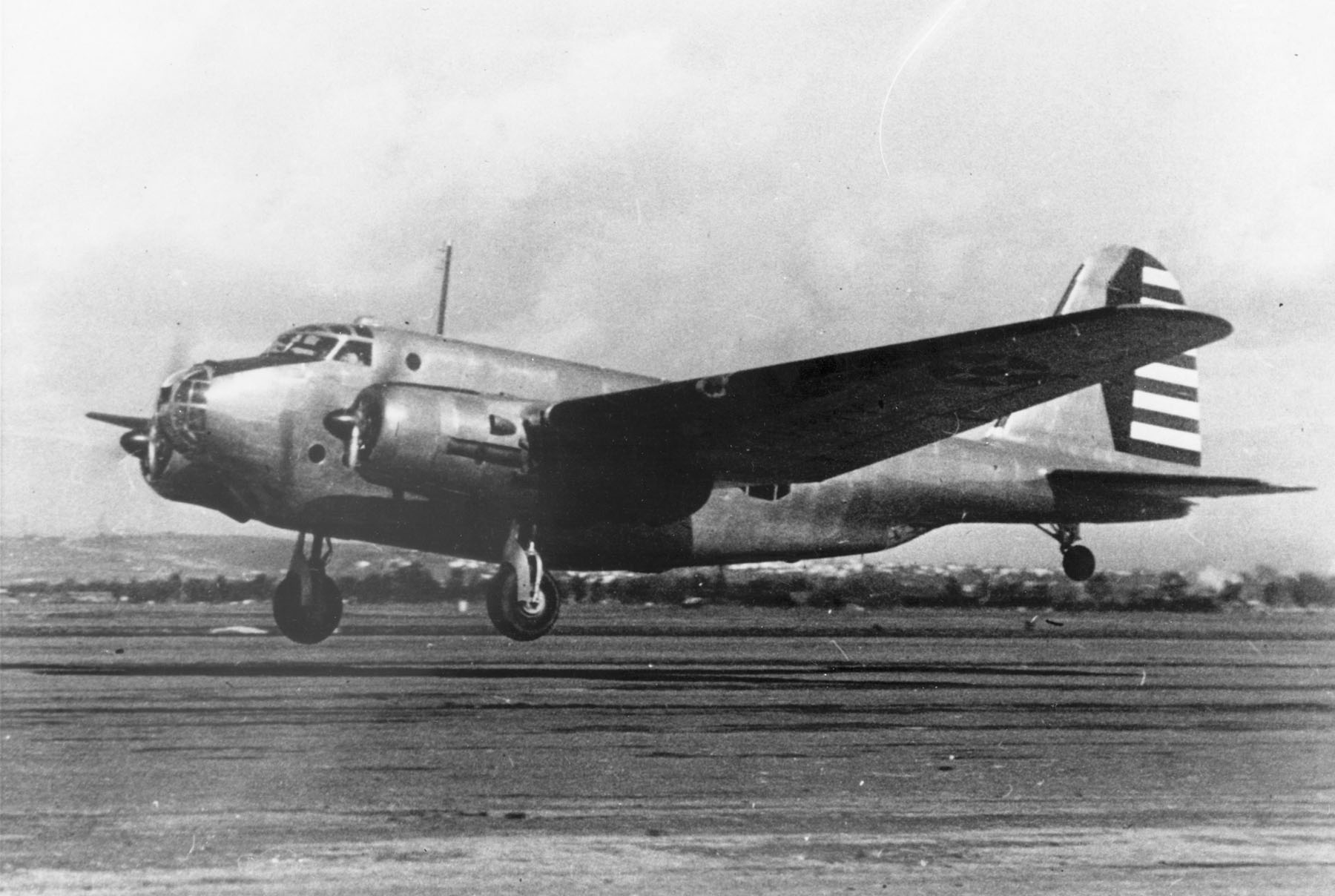

General information
- Type: Medium bomber
- National origin: United States
- Manufacturer: North American Aviation
- Primary user: United States Army Air Corps
- Number built: 1

History
- First flight: 22 December 1936
- Developed into: North American NA-40

The North American XB-21 (manufacturer's model designation NA-21) and sometimes referred to by the name "Dragon", was a prototype bomber aircraft developed by North American Aviation in the late 1930s, for evaluation by the United States Army Air Corps. Evaluated against the Douglas B-18 Bolo, it was found to be considerably more expensive than the rival aircraft, and despite the ordering of a small number of evaluation aircraft, only the prototype was ever built.

== Design and development ==
North American Aviation's first twin-engined military aircraft, the NA-21 prototype was constructed at North American's factory in Inglewood, California, where work on the aircraft began in early 1936. The NA-21 was a mid-wing monoplane of all-metal construction, powered by two Pratt & Whitney R-2180-A Twin Hornet radial engines, which were fitted with turbosuperchargers for increased high-altitude performance.

Flown by a crew of six to eight men, the XB-21 featured a remarkably strong defensive armament for the time, including as many as five .30-calibre M1919 machine guns. These were planned to be fitted in hydraulically powered nose and dorsal turrets, in addition to manually operated weapons installed in waist and ventral positions. Up to 10,000 pounds (4,500 kg) of bombs could be carried in an internal bomb bay, with 2,200 pounds (1,000 kg) of bombs being able to be carried over a range of 1,900 miles (3,100 km).

== Testing and evaluation ==
Undertaking its maiden flight on 22 December 1936 at Mines Field in Los Angeles, test flights indicated a number of minor problems. Modifications resolving these resulted in the aircraft being re-designated NA-39, and, accepted by the US Army Air Corps as the XB-21. The aircraft, which had been assigned the serial number 38-485, was evaluated early the following year in competition against a similar design by Douglas Aircraft, an improved version of the company's successful B-18 Bolo.

During the course of flight testing, the gun turrets proved troublesome, their drive motors proving to be underpowered, and issues with wind blast through the gun slots were also encountered. As a result of these problems, the XB-21's nose turret was faired over, while the dorsal turret was removed.

The XB-21 proved to have superior performance over its competitor, but price became the primary factor distinguishing the Bolo and the XB-21. On this account, the modified B-18 was declared the winner of the competition, Douglas quoting a price per aircraft of US$64,000, while North American's estimate was US$122,000 per aircraft, and an order was placed for 177 of the Douglas aircraft, to be designated B-18A.

Despite this, the US Army Air Corps found the performance of the XB-21 to have been favorable enough to order five pre-production aircraft, to be designated YB-21. However, soon after this contract was awarded, it was cancelled, and none of the YB-21s were ever built, leaving the XB-21 as the sole example of the type ever constructed. Operated by North American Aviation, the XB-21 served as a research aircraft until its retirement.

Although the XB-21 failed to win a production contract, it was the first of a long line of North American Aviation medium bomber aircraft, and provided experience and knowledge that assisted in the development of the North American NA-40, which, developed into the B-25 Mitchell, would become one of the Army's standard medium bombers of World War II.

== Specifications (XB-21) ==
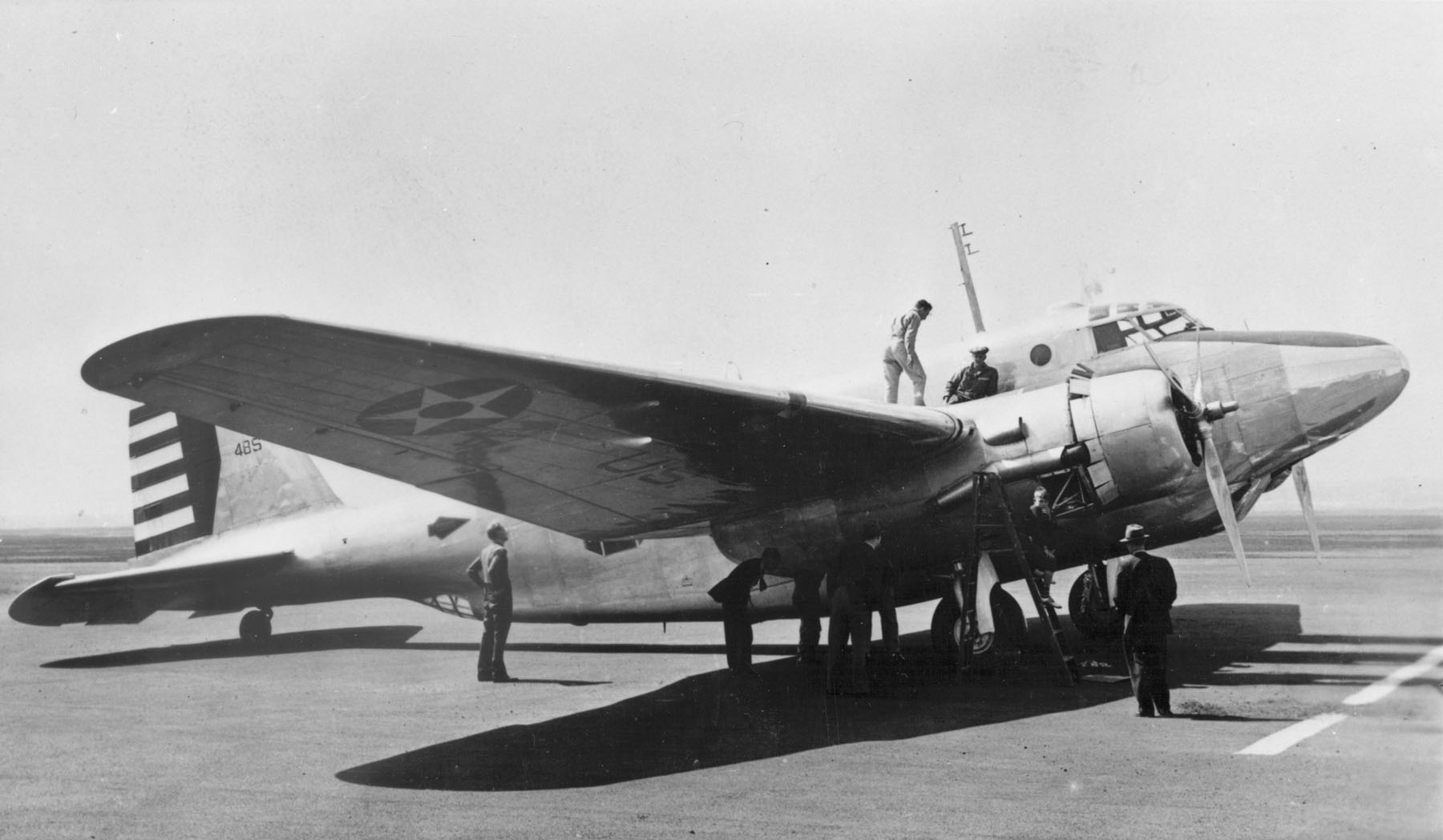
The XB-21 prototype undergoing maintenance

Data from

General characteristics

- Crew: Six to eight
- Length: 61 ft 9 in (18.82 m)
- Wingspan: 95 ft 0 in (28.96 m)
- Height: 14 ft 9 in (4.50 m)
- Wing area: 1,120 sq ft (104 m^{2})
- Empty weight: 19,082 lb (8,655 kg)
- Gross weight: 27,253 lb (12,362 kg)
- Max takeoff weight: 40,000 lb (18,144 kg)
- Powerplant: 2 × Pratt & Whitney R-2180-A Twin Hornet turbosupercharged radial engines, 1,200 hp (890 kW) each
- Propellers: 3-bladed

Performance

- Maximum speed: 220 mph (350 km/h, 190 kn) at 10,000 feet (3,000 m)
- Cruise speed: 190 mph (310 km/h, 170 kn)
- Range: 1,960 mi (3,150 km, 1,700 nmi) with 2,200 pounds (1,000 kg) of bombs
- Combat range: 600 mi (970 km, 520 nmi) with 10,000 pounds (4,500 kg) of bombs
- Service ceiling: 25,000 ft (7,600 m)
- Time to altitude: 10 minutes to 10,000 feet (3,000 m)

Armament

- Guns: Five .30-calibre machine guns, mounted in single turrets in the nose and dorsal positions, and single manually operated mounts in the waist and ventral positions.
- Bombs: Up to 10,000 pounds (4,500 kg) in an internal bay.

== See also ==
Related development

- North American NA-40
- North American B-25 Mitchell

Aircraft of comparable role, configuration, and era

- Breguet 693
- Bristol Blenheim
- Douglas B-18 Bolo
- Fiat BR.20
- Martin Model 146
- Mitsubishi Ki-21
- PZL.37 Łoś

Related lists

- List of bomber aircraft
- List of military aircraft of the United States
