= Stearman XA-21 =

Attack aircraft prototype by Stearman

XA-21
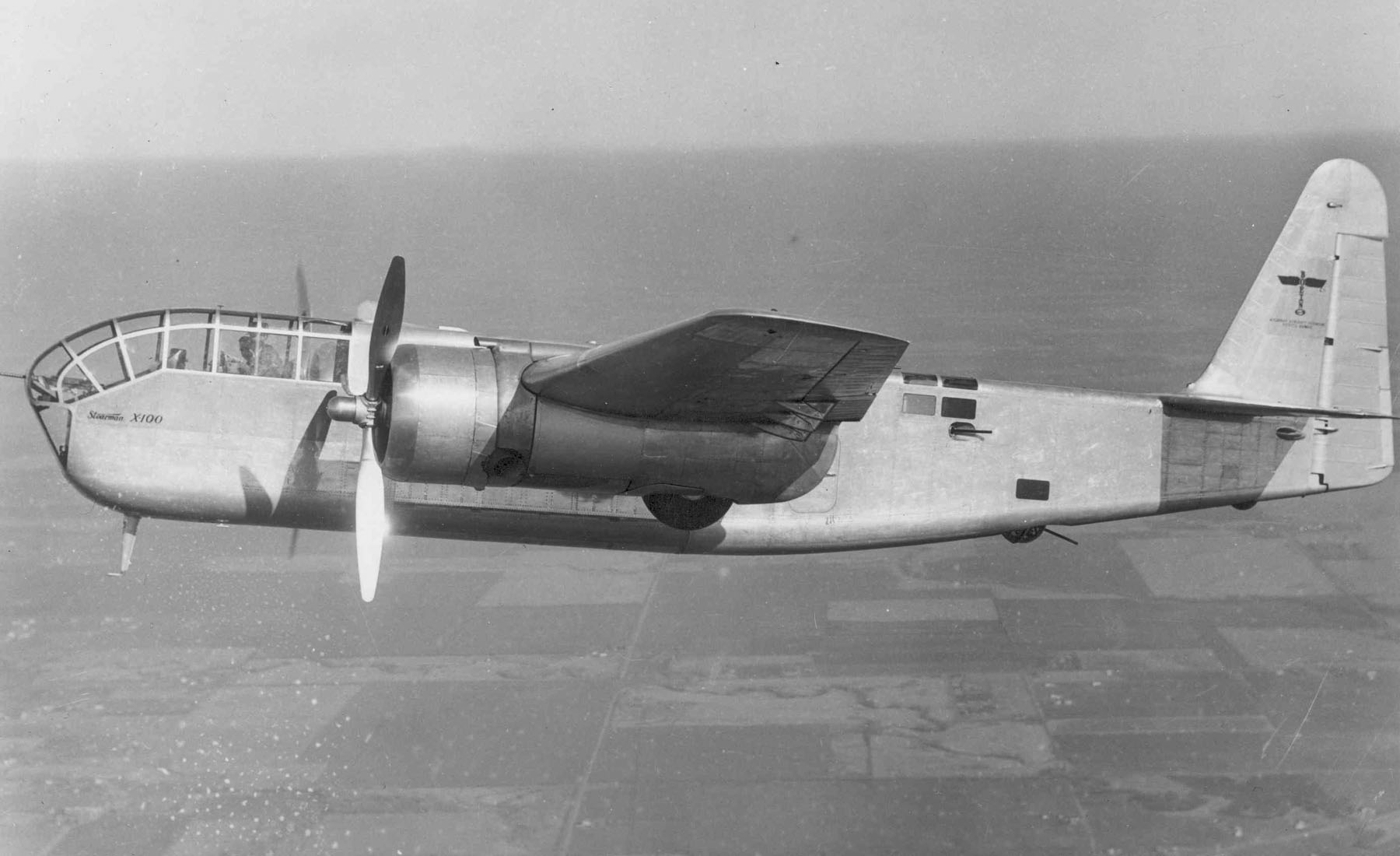
- Stearman XA-21 with streamlined cockpit

General information
- Type: Ground attack
- National origin: United States
- Manufacturer: Stearman Aircraft
- Status: Prototype
- Primary user: United States Army Air Corps
- Number built: 1

History
- First flight: 1938

The Stearman XA-21 (Model X-100) was a competitor in a United States Army Air Corps competition for a twin-engined attack aircraft which (after redesigns) led to the Douglas A-20 Havoc, Martin A-22 Maryland and North American B-25 Mitchell.

== Design and development ==
The X-100, designated XA-21 following purchase by the Army Air Corps, was a twin-engined high-winged monoplane of all-metal construction. Its initial design featured an unusual "stepless cockpit" arrangement, much like those on most German World War II bombers designed during the war years from the He 111P onwards, with a streamlined, well-framed greenhouse canopy enclosing both the pilot and bombardier stations.

== Operational history ==
The XA-21 was first tested with the streamlined cockpit but this configuration was found to restrict the pilot's forward vision, and the aircraft was rebuilt with a conventional (stepped) nose and cockpit structure. Although this change in the cockpit did not significantly affect performance, the XA-21 was not ordered into production.' The sole XA-21 was purchased by the Army Air Corps in September 1939, and was assigned serial number 40-191.

== Operators ==
United States

- United States Army Air Corps

== Specifications (XA-21) ==
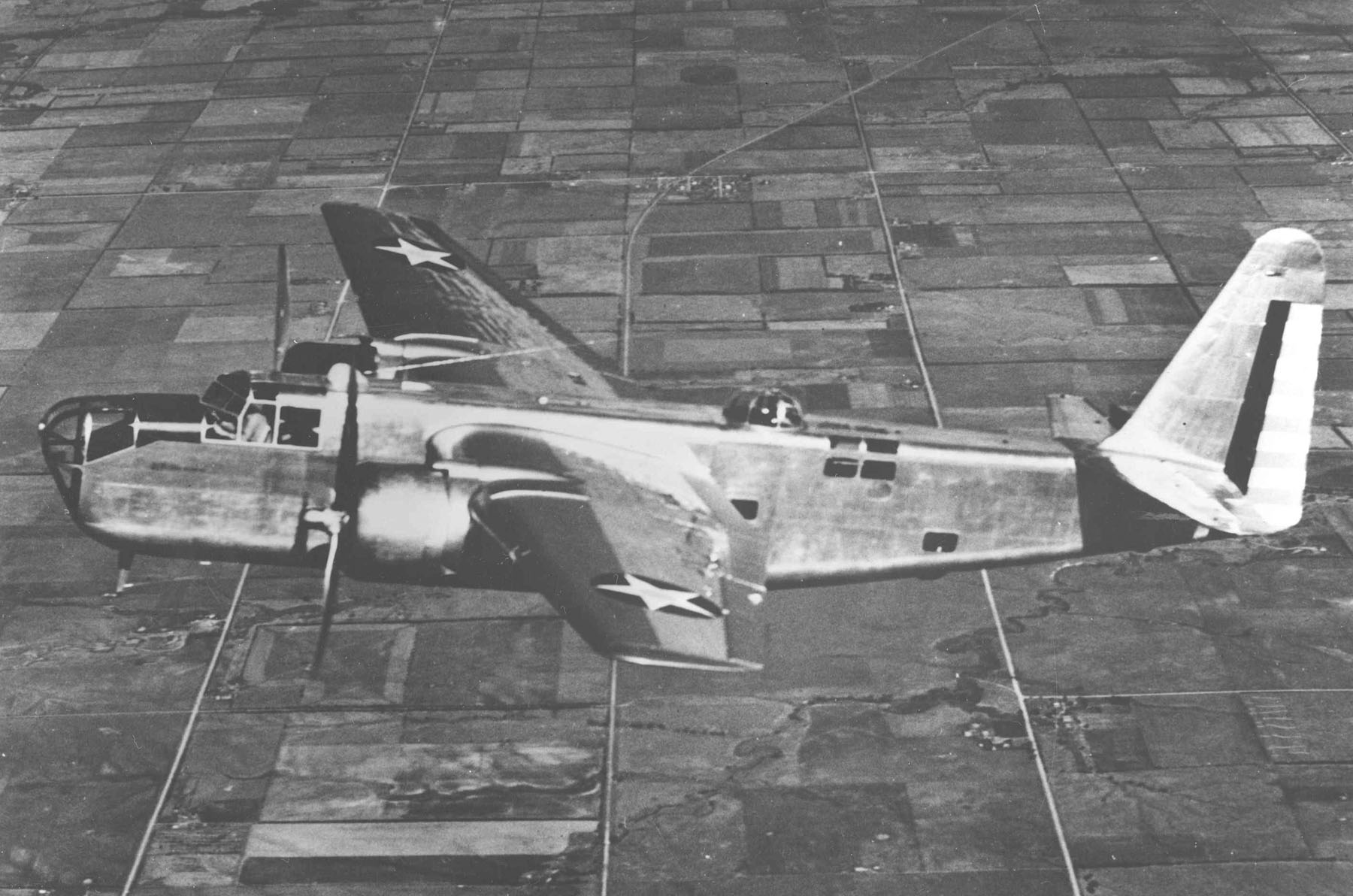
In flight

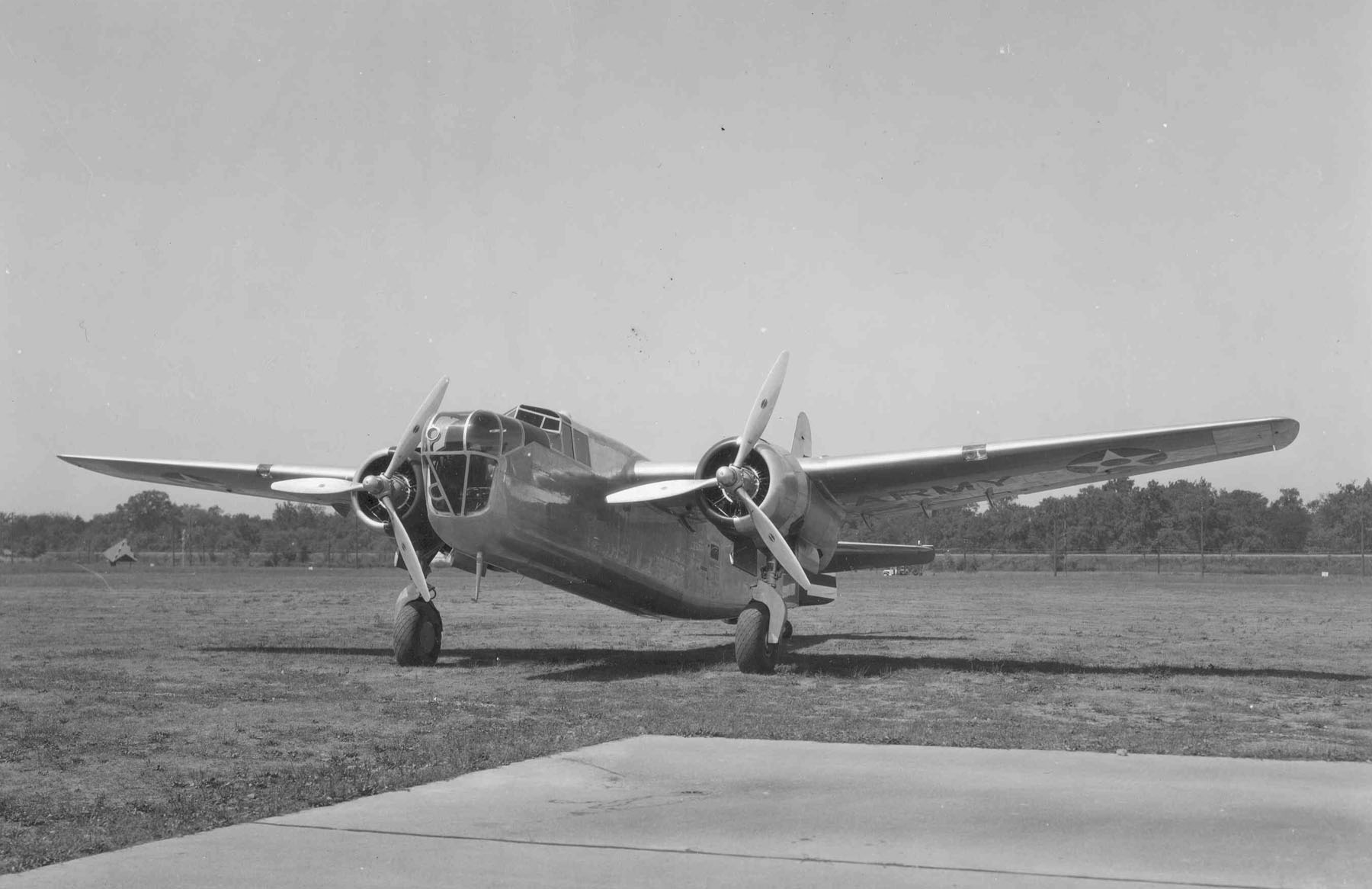
Front view

Data from Museum of the United States Air Force

General characteristics

- Crew: 3
- Capacity: 5,560 lb (2,520 kg)
- Length: 53 ft 1 in (16.18 m)
- Wingspan: 65 ft 0 in (19.81 m)
- Height: 14 ft 2 in (4.32 m)
- Wing area: 607 sq ft (56.39 m^{2})
- Empty weight: 12,760 lb (5,789 kg)
- Gross weight: 18,230 lb (8,269 kg)
- Powerplant: 2 × Pratt & Whitney R-2180-7 Twin Hornet radial engines, 1,400 hp (1,030 kW) each

Performance

- Maximum speed: 223 kn (257 mph, 414 km/h)
- Cruise speed: 174 kn (200 mph, 322 km/h)
- Wing loading: 30.0 lb/sq ft (147 kg/m^{2})
- Power/mass: 0.15 hp/b (250 W/kg)

Armament

- Guns: ** 4 × wing-mounted 0.30 in (7.6 mm) M1919 Browning machine guns
  - 1 × nose-mounted 0.30 in (7.6 mm) in machine gun
  - 4 × aft-firing 0.30 in (7.6 mm) in machine guns
- Bombs: 2,700 lb (1,200 kg)

== See also ==
Related lists

- List of military aircraft of the United States
