= List of accidents and incidents involving military aircraft (1945–1949) =

This is a list of accidents and incidents involving military aircraft grouped by the year in which the accident or incident occurred. Not all of the aircraft were in operation at the time. For more comprehensive lists, see the Bureau of Aircraft Accidents Archives, the Air Safety Network or the Dutch Scramble Stoffer & Blik Database. Combat losses are not included, except for a few singular cases.

== Aircraft terminology ==
Information on aircraft are the type and, if available, the serial number of the operator; the constructor's number, also known as the manufacturer's serial number (c/n); exterior codes; nicknames (if any); flight call sign, and operating units.

== January–March 1945 ==
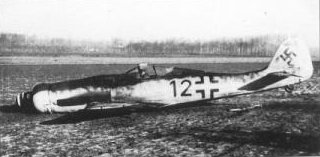
A Focke-Wulf Fw 190D-9, flown by Leutnant Theo Nibel, downed by a partridge near Brussels on 1 January 1945

1 January
A Focke-Wulf Fw 190D-9 Black 12 of 10./JG. 54, flown by Leutnant Theo Nibel of the Grimbergen force, was downed during Unternehmen Bodenplatte when it struck a partridge. The bird made a hole in the plane's radiator, forcing a gear-up landing near Brussels.

A Lockheed P-38G-10-LO Lightning, 42-13400, c/n 222-7834, crash-landed on Attu Island in the Aleutians, 2,000 miles (3,200 km) west of Anchorage, Alaska, on a training mission; the pilot, 2nd Lt. Robert Nesmith, was uninjured. The plane's propellers were torn off, its horizontal stabilizer was broken, and its left nacelle was buckled. After a salvage for parts, it was abandoned in place. Recovered in June 1999, it was transported by helicopter to the U.S. Coast Guard station at Attu and flown to Anchorage in an Alaska Air National Guard Lockheed C-130 Hercules. The plane was registered as N55929. Restored at Elmendorf Air Force Base, Alaska, it was placed on display in McCloud Memorial Park at Elmendorf in April 2000.

2 January
Admiral Bertram Ramsay, departing from Toussus-le-Noble, France in a Lockheed Hudson for a meeting with General Bernard Montgomery in Brussels, was killed with four other people when the aircraft crashed on takeoff. The cause was attributed to icing, which made the aircraft tail-heavy.

10 January
A Northrop P-61B-1-NO Black Widow, 42-39445, c/n 964 of the 550th Fighter Squadron, based at Hollandia, New Guinea, on a supposed proficiency flight (the pilot took three passengers, including a 20-year-old WAAC nurse), landed (largely intact) at the 5,000-foot (1,500 m) level of the Cyclops Mountains, a few miles from its airfield. All aboard survived, with minor injuries. The airframe, recovered in 1989 by helicopter, is being restored at the Mid-Atlantic Air Museum in Reading, Pennsylvania.

19 January
RAF group captain J. F. X. McKenna AFC, elected a fellow of the Royal Aeronautical Society in 1944 and appointed commandant of the Empire Test Pilots' School of the Aeroplane and Armament Experimental Establishment in March of that year, was killed during a familiarisation flight on Mustang Mk IV KH648. The plane crashed when the ammunition-box cover detached at high speed and the aircraft lost a wing on the perimeter of Old Sarum Airfield, 2 nautical miles (3.7 km; 2.3 mi) north-northeast of Salisbury, Wiltshire, England.

23 January
An RAF Expeditor was lost in the Adriatic Sea near Brindisi. The aircraft was one of two carrying a delegation from the House of Commons to visit British forces in Italy; two members of Parliament, Robert Bernays and John Dermot Campbell, were killed. The plane was not found, and an investigation concluded that the pilot had attempted to push on through a heavy snowstorm rather than change course.

30 January
A Consolidated B-24L-1-FO Liberator, 44-49180, crashed west of Helendale, California. The crew consisted of 1st Lt. James G. Wright (pilot), 2nd Lt. Norbert J. Vehr (copilot), 2nd Lt. Carl F. Hansen (radar instructor), 2nd Lt. John R. Palin (radar student), 2nd Lt. Herbert A. Perry (radar student), and T/Sgt. Harvey L. Cook (flight engineer). Perry, Vehr and Cook died in the crash, and the remaining crew members bailed out. The wreckage was recovered to Victorville Army Airfield, California, in February 1945, and reclamation was complete on 9 February.

February
The Akutan Zero was destroyed during a training accident at Naval Air Station San Diego, California. While Cmdr. Richard G. Crommelin was taxiing the Mitsubishi A6M for take-off, a Curtiss SB2C Helldiver went out of control and crashed into it; the Helldiver's propeller sliced the A6M to pieces. From the wreckage, Rear Admiral William N. Leonard salvaged the manifold pressure gauge, air-speed indicator and the folding panel of the port wingtip, which he donated to the National Museum of the United States Navy. The Alaska Aviation Heritage Museum has two manufacturer's plates, and the Smithsonian National Air and Space Museum has small pieces of the A6M. Crommelin, one of the five Alabama brothers who graduated from the U. S. Naval Academy, was killed in a mid-air collision on a mission over Hokkaido in July 1945. USS Crommelin is named for the brothers.

1 February
An RAF Avro York (MW116) crashed off Lampedusa while attempting to ditch after running out of fuel en route to Malta. Four crew members were injured and rescued by USS Kendrick; four other crew members and all eleven passengers were killed. The passengers, part of a Foreign Office delegation en route to the Yalta Conference, included the private secretary to the permanent secretary of the department and a King's Messenger.

9 or 11 February
A Lockheed P-38L-1-LO Lightning, 44-24838, of the 432d Base Unit, Portland Army Air Base, crashed in the Oregon desert about 25 miles (40 km) southeast of Christmas Valley on a gunnery-training flight. The pilot, 25-year-old 2nd Lt. Max J. Clark, was killed. On 14 June 2007, the Bureau of Land Management (BLM) declared the crash scene a historic Federal government site at a Flag Day ceremony. An interpretive plaque, describing the designation and the historical significance of the site, was unveiled.

13 February
A Douglas R4D-6, BuNo 50765, c/n 14848/26293, of Air Transport Squadron 3 of the US Navy crashed into the sea near Alameda, California, while on approach for landing at Naval Air Station Oakland; all twenty-one passengers and three crew members were killed.

During a high-speed taxi run at Seattle's Boeing Field in Boeing XF8B-1, BuNo 57984, pilot Bob Lamsen experienced an unexpected undercarriage retraction at 4:30 pm. The airframe came to rest near the middle of the main runway after sliding about 1,000 feet (300 m). No emergency services were required; reports of smoke and fire were apparently due to runway friction. To aid the investigation, three cranes tried to lift the large fighter plane onto a flatbed truck with the gear still retracted; however, they could not gain sufficient height and a decision was made to manually extend the gear so the airframe could be moved with no further damage.

17 February
Luftwaffe experten (ace) Jürgen Harder (13 June 1918 – 17 February 1945), recipient of the Knight's Cross of the Iron Cross, with 64 claimed victories, was killed in the crash of a Messerschmitt Bf 109G-14, Werk. Nr. 784 738, near Strausberg, Germany, after the plane's engine failed. Technical experts who analysed the wreckage concluded that the piston of cylinder 12 penetrated the engine block; escaping fumes incapacitated Harder, who lost control of the aircraft.

18 February
Luftwaffe pilot Leutnant Erwin Ziller runs into problems 45 minutes into the third flight of Horten H.IX V2, when of one of the plane's jet engines failed; the aircraft spun to the right, and crashed just outside the airfield perimeter. Ziller died in hospital a fortnight later. This second prototype was the only powered Horten IX to fly. The incomplete V3 prototype was shipped to the United States, and is in the Smithsonian National Air and Space Museum.

19 February
Two Lockheed P-38L Lightnings of the 433d Base Unit out of Chico Army Airfield, California, collide in mid-air 28 miles (45 km) northwest of Barstow, California, during a routine training and gunnery-practice flight and came down near Superior Dry Lake. "When the planes collided, one exploded in the air, and the other crashed to the ground." 2d Lt. Earl A. Morgan Jr. (in P-38L-1-LO, 44-23861) and 2d Lt. Walter E. Mogensen (in P-38L-5-LO, 44-25637) were both killed. Morgan's mother, Ruth E. Morgan, lived in Camp Rowio, Texas; Mogensen's father, Carl G. Mogensen, lived in Modesto, California. "Col. Robert A. Nagle, commanding officer, permitted the identity of the two officers to become known last night (19 February) after notification had been given to next of kin."

22 Feb 1945. Two TBF Avengers collide near Anacapa Island off the coast of California, 4 men are killed. (More details needed).

26 February
Lieutenant General Millard Harmon (1888-1945) and Brigadier General James Roy Andersen (1904–1945) are lost with the Consolidated C-87A-CO Liberator Express, 41-24174, on which they were flying between Kwajalein and Johnston Island, en route to Hawaii. Harmon graduated from the United States Military Academy in 1912. In 1942 Harmon first became the Chief of the Air Staff, Army Air Forces and then the commander of all U.S. Army forces in the South Pacific Area. In 1944 he became commander of Army Air Forces, Pacific Ocean Areas (AAFPOA) and deputy commander of the Twentieth Air Force. The flight that Harmon and Andersen were on that led to their deaths was conducted because Harmon was on the way to Washington, D.C. to settle a dispute over long-distance escort fighter groups originally a part of his forces that were transferred to Major General Curtis Lemay, the commander of XXI Bomber Command. Andersen graduated from the United States Military Academy in 1926, served at several army installations, and obtained his wings at Kelly Field, Texas, in 1936. In 1943–1944, he served on the War Department General Staff. In January 1945, Andersen was assigned to HQ AAF, Pacific Ocean Area. Harmon Air Force Base, Guam, and Andersen Air Force Base, Guam, were named in their honor. The pilot of the aircraft was F. E. Savage.

1 March
The first manned flight test, launched from the Lager Heuberg military training area near Stetten am kalten Markt, of Bachem Ba 349 Natter M23 (a vertically-launched bomber interceptor) failed when Oberleutnant Lothar Sieber, 22 (a volunteer), was killed as rocket-powered aircraft reached about 1,650 feet (500 m). The cockpit canopy detached; the Ba 349 nosed over onto its back and fell about 4,800 feet (1,500 m), killing the pilot. No cause for crash was determined, but it was thought that the improperly-latched canopy might have knocked Siebert unconscious. Three successful manned flights subsequently took place and a group of the fighters were readied for intercept missions, but advancing U.S. 8th Army armoured units overran the launch site before the Natters could be used.

Two Bell P-59A-1-BE Airacomets of the 29th Fighter Squadron, 412th Fighter Group at Muroc Army Air Field, California, collided in mid-air over the Mojave Desert near Grey Butte Army Airfield during an anti-aircraft tracking exercise. 2nd Lt. Robert W. Murdock (pilot of 44-22620) and 2nd Lt. Howard L. Wilson, in 44-22626, were killed in the collision.

4 March
At 1:51 am, Junkers Ju 88G-6, Werknummer 620028, D5+AX, piloted by Hauptman J. Dreher with a crew of three from night fighter unit 13./Nachtjagdgeschwader 3, was the last Axis aircraft to crash on British soil during World War II. Confused by auto headlights, the fighter hit a tree while attacking the airfield at RAF Elvington and crashed at Sutton upon Derwent, Yorkshire; all four crew members were killed. Two other Ju 88s crashed in separate incidents at 1:37 and 1:45 am.

14 March
The first of two prototypes of the experimental Cornelius XFG-1-CR fuel glider, 44-28059, crashed 3 miles (4.8 km) west of Wilmington, Ohio, during spin testing from Clinton County Army Air Field in Ohio, killing test pilot Alfred Reitherman of the Spartan Aircraft Company (which designed the aircraft). The fuel-glider concept (being towed behind bombers) was abandoned at the end of the war.

17 March
After an afternoon attack by two Arado Ar 234B Blitzs of 6./KG76 on U.S. Army forces crossing the Rhine at Remagen, Uffw. Pohlmann was killed when his Arado, WNr. 140180, was destroyed in a crash-landing at Burg following engine failure.

18 March
On March 18, 1945, a F-7B Liberator (Serial Number 44-41678), with a crew of nine, departed Cox's Bazaar, India, for a combat photo reconnaissance mission. Immediately after takeoff, the aircraft crashed into the Bay of Bengal and sank into the ocean. Four members of the crew were rescued, but five remained on board the Liberator when it sank. The remains of one crew member later floated to the surface, were recovered, and identified. The plane could not be salvaged, and the remains of the other four lost crew members were never recovered.

20 March
Lockheed test pilot Tony LeVier was forced to bail out of the third Lockheed XP-80 prototype, 44-83021, c.n. 141-1002, nicknamed "Gray Ghost", of the 4144th AAF Base Unit, Muroc Army Air Field, California, after catastrophic turbine-blade failure sliced off the aircraft's tail. LeVier came down on Highway 99 near Rosamond, California, breaking his back; he was sidelined for six months.

27 March
RAF Consolidated LB-30 Liberator II AL504, the first Mk. II accepted by the British, was converted to VIP transport for the prime minister and named Commando; it had received a single PB4Y-style fin and rudder modification. The plane was lost over the Atlantic Ocean between the Azores and Ottawa. Lost with the crew were Air Marshal Peter Roy Maxwell Drummond, the RAF's Air Member for Training; Rupert Brabner MP, the Under-Secretary of State for Air, and Air Ministry deputy undersecretary John Abraham.

31 March
USAAF C-47 crashed in England killing co-pilot 2LT Joseph Lincoln Cotterman according to a Telegram received by the pilots family.

== April–June 1945 ==
5 April
A prototype Ryan XFR-1 Fireball, BuNo 48234, piloted by Ryan test pilot Dean Lake on a test flight over Lindbergh Field in San Diego, California, lost skin between the front and rear spars of the starboard wing; interrupted airflow over the wing made it disintegrate. Lake bailed out, and the airframe broke up; wreckage struck a new Consolidated PB4Y-2 Privateer, BuNo 59836, just accepted by the Navy and preparing to depart for the modification center at Litchfield Park, Arizona. The bomber burned, and the Navy crew of pilot Lt. D. W. Rietz, Lt. J. E. Creed, and Aviation Machinists Mates G. R. Brown and J. H. Randall evacuated the burning PB4Y. Only Randall was injured: first-, second- and third-degree burns and minor lacerations.

5 April
Boeing B-17G-50-VE Flying Fortress 44-8152, c/n 7552 ("Miss Ida") of the 748th Bomb Squadron (H), 457th Bomb Group (H), was lost on takeoff from RAF Glatton. Its target was the ordnance depot in Ingolstadt, Germany. The commanding officer of the 748th, Major Edward B. Dozier, was the designated air commander. As the lead aircraft (containing Dozier and Lt. Donald B. Snow) lifted off the runway, the number-two (port inner) engine caught fire. The airframe crashed just past the end of the runway; the bomb-load explosion was heard throughout the airfield, and created an eight-foot (2.4 m) crater. Nine men were killed, and one crew member survived. The mission was delayed and was out of position in the bomber stream because of the accident. The group bombed in trail at 14,000 feet (4,300 m) because of heavy clouds at the briefed altitude, and the bombing results were unknown.

8 April
The first prototype Rikugun Ki-93 1 twin-engine fighter made its only flight from Tachikawa airfield, a successful 20-minute test of its low-speed handling characteristics, piloted by Lt. Moriya of the Koku Shinsa-bu (Air Examination Department) with 2nd Lt. Ikebayashi in the second seat. Moriya undershot the runway and touched down in soft soil, ground-looping the airframe and tearing off its port undercarriage leg and engine mount and bending its six-blade propeller. Repairs were completed in four weeks; the night before the scheduled second test flight, however, a B-29 bombing raid on Tachikawa destroyed the hangar housing the airframe.

8 April
United States Navy Consolidated PB4Y-2 Privateer, BuNo 59442, Zebra 442 of VPB-108, based at Tinian, Northern Marianas Islands, was lost on an aircrew-search mission over the Pacific Ocean when the crew became disoriented and ditched at 6 pm. Spotted by two PB4Ys on 11 April, the crew was rescued from rafts by the submarine USS Queenfish on 12 April.

11 April
The second of two Northrop XP-61E Black Widows, 42-39557, modified from the P-61B with a cut-down fuselage and bubble canopy, was written off when an over-eager pilot tried the P-38 Lightning trick of retracting the landing gear on take-off while still on the runway. The heavier Widow settled onto the runway, its hollow steel propellers shattered, and the airframe struck a tool shack on the side of the runway; the pilot survived. The first XP-61E, 42-39549, was modified into the sole XF-15 photo-reconnaissance prototype (36 of which were built as the Northrop F-15A Reporter).

13 April
On 5 April, a B-24H-15-DT Liberator 41-28779 of the 564th Bomb Squadron, 389th Bomb Group (Heavy) captured by the Luftwaffe on 20 June 1944 (MACR 6533) and operated as KO+XA by KG 200 left Wackersleben to avoid the Soviet advance with 29 Kampfgeschwader 200 personnel aboard for a flight to Bavaria via Braunschweig. About 25 minutes into the flight, a German flak battery fired on the Liberator; the fuselage, wings and number-four (starboard outer) engine were damaged, and the rudder cables were cut. Pilot Oberfeldwebel Rauchfuss maintained control. Two passengers injured by the gunfire required immediate medical attention, one of whom later died. Rauchfuss landed in a meadow near Quedlinburg, but a powerline forced him to apply power to clear it and the bomber broke its nosewheel strut when it overran into a ploughed field. The strut was removed and sent to the Junkers component factory in Eilsleben for repair; the engine-oil leak and the rudder cables were also repaired. Returned on 12 April, the strut was reinstalled and an attempt was made to take off the following day after all excess equipment was removed to lighten the plane, The clearing was too short, the B-24 bogged down in mud, and the nose strut again broke. The crew destroyed the airframe by punching holes in the fuel tanks and setting it alight with a flare pistol.

18 April
Luftwaffe experten (ace, with 176 victories), Oberst Johannes Steinhoff of the jet experten Jagdverband 44 had a tire blow out on take-off from Munich-Riem Airport when his Messerschmitt Me 262 hits a bomb crater. Steinhoff took off, but could not reach sufficient flying speed and crashed. Severely burned, he spent two years in hospital.

19 April
During an Eighth Air Force raid on a marshaling yard in Aussig, Czechoslovakia, Luftwaffe Messerschmitt Me 262s shot down five Boeing B-17 Flying Fortresses. The fifth, Boeing B-17G-5-BO Flying Fortress 42-31188 ("Dead Man's Hand") of the 709th Bomb Squadron, 447th Bomb Group (piloted by Lt. Robert F. Glazener on its 111th combat mission), was the last 8 AF heavy bomber lost to Axis fighters in the European theatre. Seven of its eight crew members escaped from the plane.

21 April
As the Red Army closed in on Berlin, Hitler's private secretary Martin Bormann implemented Operation Seraglio: a plan to evacuate key – and favoured – members of Hitler's entourage from the Berlin bunker. Junkers Ju 352, c/n 100003, KT+VC, loaded with Adolf Hitler's personal property, left Berlin at about 5 am for Ainring (near Salzburg) piloted by Major Friedrich Gundlfinger. Among 16 passengers were Hitler's valet, SS Sgt Wilhelm Ardnt, and Hitler's bodyguard Max Fiebes. The plane flew low over the Heidenholz Forest, clipping treetops and tearing loose one of its three engines, before crashing and burning near Börnersdorf (south of Dresden). Of its two reported survivors, one later died of their injuries. "A farmer from nearby Bernersdorf [sic], supervising Russian and French forced-labourers, heard screams and hammering from the Junkers, but was able to help only the tailgunner who was able to crawl clear. On hearing of the disaster Hitler was devastated by the loss of Arndt, rather than of his archives."

Deutsche Luft Hansa Focke-Wulf Fw 200B-2 Condor D-ASHH, c/n 0009, "Hessen", hastily loaded with the baggage of the Berlin Headquarters Staff as part of Operation Seraglio, left Berlin Tempelhof Airport for Barcelona via Munich piloted by Flugkapitän August Karl Künstle with five crew members and 16 passengers. The Condor reached Munich safely, but never appeared in Spain. Extensive contemporary inquiries in Germany, Switzerland and Spain about its fate were fruitless. In 1954, evidence was discovered that the overloaded transport crashed and burned with no survivors near Piesenkofen Kreis Mühlberg, Bavaria. A German source gives 1952 as the year that "Hessen"'s crash was confirmed.

Consolidated B-24J-1-FO Liberator 42-95592 "Black Cat" of the 784th Bomb Squadron 466th Bomb Group based at RAF Attlebridge (USAAF Station 120), returning from a mission to bomb a rail bridge in Salzburg, aborted due to bad weather over the target and was hit by flak burst in its port wing near Regensburg. The last 8 AF heavy bomber lost over Germany during World War II, it was the only loss of the mission. The plane's bombardier and tail gunner escaped the aircraft and were captured; the other ten crew members were killed.

23 April

United States Army Air Forces (USAAF) Boeing B-17G-90-BO Flying Fortress 43-38856 (coded "GD-M") of the 534th Bombardment Squadron, 381st Bombardment Group (Heavy) crashed on the east-facing slope of North Barrule on the Isle of Man killing 31 US service personnel (including ground crew) en route from RAF Ridgewell (USAAF Station 167) to RAF Nutts Corner in Belfast for a memorial service for Franklin D. Roosevelt.

26 April
During a training exercise, Boeing B-17G-90-BO Flying Fortress 43-38859 collided in mid-air with another Fortress, B-17G-75-VE 44-8687. The former plane crash-landed and was repaired; the latter was destroyed, with only two crew members surviving.

28 April
Douglas A-26C-25-DT Invader 43-22644, assigned to the 611 Base Unit at Wright Field, Ohio, crashed into Choctawhatchee Bay 3 miles (4.8 km) northeast of Fort Walton, Florida after being struck by a test Speedee (Highball) bouncing bomb which tore off its tail; the bomber nosed over into the water. It had taken off from Eglin Field, Florida, on a low-level bombing exercise at AAF water range Number 60 (south of Lake Lorraine). All three occupants were killed.

29 April
North American AT-6D-NT trainer 42-84963, c.n. 88-16744, of the 2002d Base Unit, piloted by West Point Cadet Robert B. Clark, crashed into Bramley Mountain 3 miles (4.8 km) southeast of the Town of Bovina, Delaware County, New York, (in the Catskill Mountains) due to weather. The Binghamton Press reported on 1 May 1945 that "the young flier was on a routine night cross-country training flight". He was flying to Stewart Field in Newburgh, New York, and apparently was lost when he crashed.

30 April
Just before midnight, the first production Consolidated PB4Y-2 Privateer (BuNo 59359) was being prepared on the ramp at Lindbergh Field in San Diego, California, for a flight to NAS Twin Cities in Minneapolis. A mechanic attempted to remove the port battery solenoid, 14 inches (36 cm) below the cockpit floor, without disconnecting the battery. The mechanic's wrench accidentally punctured a hydraulic line three inches above the battery; the fluid ignited, setting the aircraft ablaze and severely burning him. Only the number-four (starboard outer) engine was deemed salvageable, and the cause was an unqualified mechanic attempting a task for a qualified electrician.

4 May
Consolidated PBY-5A Catalina BU #48416, assigned to NAS Alameda, California crashed into Mount Tamalpais three and 3/4 miles northeast of Alcatraz. The PBY-5A Catalina aircraft had taken off from Naval Air Station Alameda, California, at 1241, May 4, 1945, with an operational load, including 1050 gallons of fuel and 4 depth charges. Five miles northwest of the field in the vicinity of Alcatraz Island, aircraft encountered a lowering of the ceiling. Pilot radioed the tower and asked for instrument clearance to climb through overcast which was granted. About 5 minutes later the plane encountered severe turbulence and downdrafts. The port wing tip stuck to the side of the hill, causing this wing to be torn off and catapulting this plane down the hill to the left where it crashed and burned. Nine officers and an enlisted man were killed: Lieut. Comdr. Norman W. White, Oakland, CA, Lieut. (jg) Robert Moment, Planfield, NJ, First pilot; Lieut. (jg) John Leonard Hart, Seattle, WA, second pilot; Ens. Carlton Cushing Jr., Fairhaven, MA, second pilot; Frank Spofford Jr., West Oxford, MA, aviation machinist mate 1c; Leo Benjamin Ibelli, Brooklyn, NY, aviation machinist mate 3c, Frank Paul Zappacosta, Lynn, MA, aviation radioman 1cl William Thomas Ford, Delaware, OH, aviation radioman 2c. Johnnie Samuel Owens, Bakersfield, CA aviation radioman 3c. The two enlisted men that were injured: Harold Robert Dole, Lorraine, OH, aviation ordnanceman.

6 May
1st Lt. Vincent J. Rudnick, on a local training and acrobatics flight from King's Cliffe, Great Britain, in North American P-51D-5-NA Mustang 44-13720 coded "MC-X" and nicknamed "Mine 3 Express" of the 20th Fighter Group, lost control at the top of a loop at about 2:45 pm near Stoke Ferry. The aircraft went into an irrecoverable spin, the pilot bailed out, and the airframe crashed near a cottage in Springside. In June 1985, the crash site was excavated and some wreckage was found.

8 May
The first prototype (of three) Curtiss XF15C-1, BuNo 01213, crashed on a landing approach to Buffalo, New York due to fuel starvation; test pilot Charles Cox was killed. Two other prototypes were modified with a T-tail to correct problems, but the last Curtiss design for the United States Navy never entered production. The second prototype was scrapped, but the third (and final) airframe is preserved at the New England Air Museum in Connecticut.

10 May
Naval Auxiliary Air Facility Lewiston-based Howard GH-2 Nightingale ambulance (BuNo 32360), overloaded for runway length, crashed on takeoff from the Rangeley, Maine airstrip. Lt. Eugene B. Slocum, AMM3C Louis F. Ceurvorst, Pfc. James V. Haney of the United States Marine Corps, and an unidentified person were killed.

12 May
Two Hawker Tempests from the RAF 3rd Squadron crashed in Denmark. The Tempests collided north of Rotenburg during wing-formation practice. Flight Sergeant Campbell was killed in SN166, and Flight Lieutenant Robertson bailed out of EJ588 (JF-N) too low.

15 May
The crash of North American AT-6A-NT Texan 41-17011, of the 2143d Base Unit, Tuskegee Army Air Field, Alabama, killed Lt. James W. Alexander. Witnesses said that they saw the plane lose a wing after they heard an explosion. The trainer came down in a field three miles (4.8 km) west of Cedar Lake, Indiana and two miles (3.2 km) west of Lowell, Indiana; Cedar Lake is seven miles (11 km) north of Lowell.

17 May
Former Our Gang actor Bobby Hutchins was killed in a mid-air collision while trying to land a North American AT-6D Texan, 42-86536, of the 3026th Base Unit when it hit a North American AT-6C Texan (42-49068, of the same unit) at Merced Army Air Field in Merced, California during a training exercise. The other pilot, Edward F. Hamel, survived.

27 May
The third prototype Curtiss XP-55 Ascender, 42-78847, was destroyed in a crash during an air show at Wright Field in Dayton, Ohio, killing pilot Capt. William C. Glasgow and two civilians on the ground. The pilot attempted a slow roll after a low pass in formation with a P-38 and a North American P-51 Mustang on each wing, crashed at the end of the runway, and plowed through a line of cars on Alternate State Route 4. Dick Bong was flying the Lightning, and Don Gentile was the Mustang pilot. Bong died in a P-80 crash on 6 August, and Gentile was killed in a Lockheed T-33A Shooting Star crash on 28 January 1951.

28 May
Curtiss SB2C-4 Helldiver, BuNo 19866, had a stalled engine during a target run and crashed into Lower Otay Reservoir near San Diego, California. Navy pilot E. D. Frazar of Richmond, Texas and United States Army gunner Joseph Metz of Youngstown, Ohio survived, swam ashore, and hitchhiked back to Ream Field. The plane was raised from the reservoir on 20 August 2010, and will be transported to Pensacola, Florida, for restoration by the National Museum of Naval Aviation.

31 May
North American B-25H-5 Mitchell, reported as 43-4643, of the 420th AAF Base Unit, March Field, California, crashed 27 miles (43 km) southeast of Victorville, California. Three crew members were killed. Joe Baugher lists that airframe as having survived the war, however, and was sold to Paul Mantz on 19 February 1946 for use as a camera platform (registered as NX1203). "At least three men were killed Friday night when a B-25 out of March field [sic] crashed on a hillside in the Lucerne valley, according to a report received by Coroner R. E. Williams from officers at the Victorville Army Air field. [sic] Details of the bomber crash were not immediately learned, the coroner said. First reports given to Coroner Williams indicated that only one body had been found at the time." "March field [sic] authorities yesterday (2 June) announced the names of three Army men killed when their two-engine bomber crashed Thursday night in Lucerne valley while on a combat training flight. The three killed were: Second Lt. August P. Marks, 21; mother, Mrs. Veronica Marks, Detroit. Flight Officer Charles F. Cizek, 20; father Charles J. Cizek, Berwyn, Ill. Sgt. Orville B. Barton, 28; mother Mrs. Florence Barton, Tieton, Wash."

4 June
Aichi E13A "Jake" floatplane, c/n 41116, of 634 Kōkūtai-Teisatsu, 302 Hikōtai, crashed into the sea during a nighttime search mission. Salvaged off Kaseda city, Kagoshima prefecture on 22 August 1992, it is displayed unrestored at the Kasedo Peace Museum in Kyūshū, Japan.

6 June
The Boeing B-29-40-BW Superfortress that led the first B-29 raid on Tokyo on 24 November 1944 (42-24592), nicknamed "Dauntless Dotty", of the 869th Bomb Squadron, 497th Bomb Group, 73rd Bomb Wing, 20th Air Force, left Kwajalein at 3:06 am for the second leg of a ferry flight back to the United States, commanded by Capt. William A. Kelley of Tifton, Georgia. Forty seconds after takeoff the aircraft crashed into the Pacific Ocean and sank, killing 10 of the 13 aboard instantly. Co-pilot 1st Lt. John Neville of Bradley, Illinois, tailgunner S/Sgt. Glenn F. Gregory of Waldron, Illinois, and left gunner S/Sgt. Charles McMurray (spelt McMurry in one source) of Memphis, Tennessee were thrown from the wreckage and recovered by a rescue boat after about 45 minutes in the water. A search for the lost airframe by the Australian National Underwater and Marine Agency was proposed in 2015.

13 June
USAAF Consolidated B-24H-25-FO Liberator 42-95095 of the 66th Bomb Squadron, 44th Bomb Group, returning to the United States from Prestwick Airfield, crashed in Shieldaig in the remote Fairy Lochs in Wester Ross, Scotland; its crew of nine, from the 66th Bombardment Squadron, were killed. Also on board were six crewmen from Air Transport Command, and the pilot was Jack B. Ketcham. A memorial has been erected at the site.

14 June
"Vicksburg, Miss, June 15 (AP) - Seventeen naval personnel, including two WAVES, were killed and a Navy lieutenant seriously injured yesterday (14 June) when a big transport plane exploded and crashed in a wooded area 16 miles northeast of here." The account misstated the casualties' branch of service. The Aviation Archeology database lists USAAF Curtiss C-46D-15-CU Commando 44-77948 of the 811th Base Unit, Lawson Field, Georgia, piloted by William A. Ross, as crashing due to weather six miles (9.7 km) southeast of Oak Ridge, Mississippi, on this date. "Jackson, Miss., June 15 (U.P.). - Army officials today investigated the crash of a plane near Oak Ridge, Miss., in which 17 persons, two of them women, were killed." The Biloxi Daily Herald reported on 16 June that the sole survivor was Sgt. R. L. Bullock of Somerset, New Jersey, an engineer on a B-17 stationed at Laredo, Texas, who was thrown clear when the plane crashed and exploded. He managed "to grab some weeds and pull himself away", but was severely burned and was taken to Mercy Hospital in Vicksburg. Bullock said that after refuelling in Shreveport, Louisiana, bound for Lawson Field, the flight encountered heavy overcast and storms. The C-46 flight engineer warned those aboard to adjust their safety belts just before the transport encountered two air pockets, the first of which dropped the plane 1,000 feet (300 m). "The pilot did everything he could to bring the ship out", said Bullock. "He never did lose control but the downward plunge was too rapid." The Daily Herald reported that the two female victims were a WAC and a WAVE. "The earliest lightning-related accident for which a detailed description is available involved a U.S. Air Force [sic] Curtiss C-46D transport plane en route from Dallas to Jackson, Mississippi, U.S., on June 14, 1945. While at 3,000 ft., one wing was struck by lightning. Unable to maintain altitude, the aircraft crashed into a wooded area."

15 June
"London, June 15 (UP) - Twenty-seven members of the royal air force [sic] were killed early today when a Liberator crashed into the side of a hill on the Dorset coast at Swanage." RY-3, JT985, of No. 232 Squadron was lost.

19 June
The Associated Press reported on 21 June that five men were killed when their army plane crashed near Crestview, Florida, on 19 June. Officials at Marianna Army Airfield in Florida said that the plane, en route from Eglin Field, Florida to Myrtle Beach Army Airfield, South Carolina, came down in a storm. First Lt. Joseph A. McGinnis, 24, the pilot, was from the Marianna base. He was the son of Joseph A. McGinnis of Philadelphia. The others (all stationed at Myrtle Beach) were First Lt. Lawrence F. Schirmer, 25, Sacramento, California; T-Sgt. William J. Koger, 25, husband of Mary G. Koger of Louisville, Georgia; T-Sgt. William H. Epperson, 25, Evanston, Illinois; and S-Sgt. George L. Simmons, 26, of Lakeland, Florida. "McGinnis was an instructor pilot with more than 1,200 hours of flying time and combat experience with the Canadian air force before U. S. entrance in the war, and with the American air corps in North Africa, Sicily and Italy." The Aviation Archeological Investigation and Research site lists Douglas A-26C Invader 44-35024 of the 137th Base Unit as crashing on this date, but that serial number is associated with an A-26B Invader. The site lists the pilot as Joseph A. McGlens Jr., and the crash location as Myrtle Beach.

c. 29 June
Messerschmitt test pilot Ludwig "Willie" Hofman ("Hoffman" in an American source) attempted to ferry captured Messerschmitt Me 262A1a/U4, Werke Nummer 170083, originally coded V-083, "Happy Hunter/Wilma Jeanne II" from Lagerlechfeld (near Augsburg, Germany) to Airfield A-55 near Cherbourg on behalf of the USAAF Air Technical Intelligence as part of Operation Lusty for loading aboard HMS Reaper. The plane's starboard engine failed at about 9,000 feet (2,700 m), and Hofman bailed out over Normandy (with extensive bruising, since he deployed the parachute at high speed). The aircraft was one of two conversions carrying Rheinmetall BK-5 50 mm anti-tank guns in its nose for a bomber attack, although they were never used. An American sergeant admitted a year later that he did not inspect the aircraft's engines before the flight.

== July–September 1945 ==
1 July
Boeing B-29-50-MO Superfortress 44-86334 of the 237th CCTS, 237th AAF Base Unit, Kirtland Field in New Mexico, flown by Second Lt. Ward W. Copenhaver, crashed six miles (9.7 km) south of Benton, Kentucky during a cross-country flight in an electrical storm. Nine crew members were killed, and one survived. "MAYFIELD, Ky., July 1. (AP) - Four Army Air Force officers and five enlisted men were killed and one man escaped almost uninjured when a B-29 bomber crashed northeast of here early today in a severe electrical storm."

2 July
"Las Vegas, Nev., July 2 (UP) - Eleven personnel from Las Vegas Army air field were killed and two seriously injured Saturday when a heavy bomber crashed and burned as it attempted to land at the field, public relations officers announced tonight."

"A Navy pilot was killed yesterday [2 July] when his plane crashed during a routine bombing run at a target range, 10 miles east of the Twentynine Palms Naval Auxiliary Air station, according to coroner R. E. Williams. The coroner was notified that the pilot was flying a Corsair in a run at a target and the plane failed to come out of the dive. It hit the ground and exploded. Inentity [sic] of the flyer was withheld pending notification of next of kin."

5 July
The first prototype Mikoyan-Gurevich I-250, completed on 26 February 1945, had a failure of its port tailplane at low altitude; test pilot Alexandr Deyev was killed when his parachute failed to open in time. Post-crash analysis revealed that he had exceeded the airframe's g-limit while maneuvering.

7 July
On the first flight of the prototype Mitsubishi J8M1 Shusui, a Japanese derivative of the Me 163B, the aircraft reached 1,300 feet (400 m) in a steep climb; the rocket motor then cut out, and the plane crashed at Yokosuka Naval Aeronautical Engineering Arsenal. The cause was believed to be hydrogen peroxide shifting to the rear of the partially-empty tank or an air leak in the fuel line. The pilot, Lt. Cdr. Toyohiko Inuzuka, died in hospital the following day. A redesign of the fuel system followed, but no additional flights were made before the Japanese surrender in August.

12 July
United States Army Air Forces Douglas A-26C-35-DT Invader 44-35553 on a training flight collided in mid-air with Eastern Air Lines Flight 45 from Washington, D.C. to Columbia, South Carolina, a Douglas DC-3-201C NC25647 at roughly 3,100 feet (940 m), 11.9 miles (19.2 km) west-northwest of Florence, South Carolina at 2:36 pm. The A-26's vertical fin struck the airliner's port wing, displacing its engine (which cut into fuselage). The A-26's tail sheared off; two crew members parachuted, and one was killed. The DC-3 pilot belly landed in cornfield, and one passenger of the 24 aboard was killed.

13 July
Consolidated B-24H-20-FO Liberator 42-94956 (c/n 1721) of the 2135th Base Unit at Tyndall Field, Florida, piloted by Paul R. Snyder, crashed due to bad weather 12 miles (19 km) northwest of Southport, Florida. The crew were killed. They included gunner Cpl. Eddie L. Keefe, 19, of Orangeburg, South Carolina, "the only son of O. L. Keefe and Alice Youmans Keefe, of this city." He was survived by his grandparents, Mr. and Mrs. W. F. Youmans, of Luray, South Carolina. Keefe "graduated from Orangeburg high school in 1943 and attended one term at Clemson College. He entered service 22 May 1944. He was a member of Tabernacle Baptist Church. The message of Corporal Keefe's death was received by his parents Saturday morning."

14 July
North American TB-25C Mitchell (built as B-25C-1) 41-13105, assigned to the 409th Fighter Squadron, 372d Fighter Group, Esler Army Air Field near Pineville, Louisiana, crashed and burned one mile northwest of Weldon, Texas in a heavy rainstorm, killing nine crew members.

The engine of Boeing B-29-50-MO Superfortress 44-86329 of the 237th Army Air Forces Base Unit (Combat Crew Training School) failed on takeoff from Kirtland Field, Albuquerque, New Mexico. The plane crashed, killing 13 and injuring one.

15 July
Boeing B-29A-45-BN Superfortress 44-61721 (c/n 11198) of the 236th Army Air Forces Base Unit (Combat Crew Training School), Pyote Field, Texas, piloted by Lieutenant Edward J. Szycher, of Bayonne, New Jersey, went missing after the crew bailed out at 9,500 feet (2,900 m) over northern Minnesota, 180 miles (290 km) north-northwest of St. Paul, Minnesota, after the bomber filled with gasoline fumes which threatened to asphyxiate the crew. All ten crew members descended safely, although one landed in Napoleon Lake in Itasca County and had to swim ashore. The airframe was never found.

16 July
"Washington, July 17 (AP) - The Cuban embassy said today three officers of the Cuban army en route to Washington were killed in an airplane crash near Charleston, S.C., yesterday." "On July 16, 1945, Lieutenants Zorilla and Henderson, flying a C-45 number 212 and carrying as a passenger Major Rivero, an aide to the Chief of the Army, suffered an accident while on an approach to Charleston Airfield in South Carolina, United States while returning from a flight of two aircraft to Washington DC. In the other aircraft, piloted by Lieutenant Fernandez "El Callao" was on board the Chief of the Cuban Army, General Genovevo Pérez Dámera." The plane crashed near Ridgeville, South Carolina with Captain Roberto Henderson Benzanilla, Major Nicolas Rivero Garcia, Lt. Ricardo Zorrilla Armenteros and Genovevo Perez Damera.

Consolidated TBY-2 Seawolf, BuNo 30303's port main gear collapsed at NAS Patuxent River, Maryland, causing major damage.

A U.S. Navy Curtiss SB2C Helldiver crashed about three miles west of Seven Oaks, California, killing its two crew members and causing a wildfire which burned "five or six square miles of slope" in the San Bernardino Mountains near the Santa Ana River. The Eleventh Naval District confirmed the two deaths on the night of 17 July, but withheld identification pending notification of next of kin. Heavy rains in August fouled water systems in the upper San Bernardino Valley as ash, cinders and silt from this fire zone washed downstream.

18 July
Consolidated TBY-2 Seawolf BuNo 30414 overshot the runway while landing at Convair Field in Allentown, Pennsylvania, killing two crew members.

24 July
Major Paul A. Conger bailed out of Bell TP-63A Kingcobra 42-69054 (built as a P-63A-6-BE) of the 234th CCTS, Clovis AAF, New Mexico, after wing failure; the plane crashed three miles west of Clovis. "Major Paul Conger, 27-year-old Army pilot and grandson of Joe Majors, retired Santa Fe employee in San Bernardino, miraculously escaped death last week in New Mexico when his plane crashed after a wing ripped off during a flight. The young flyer, veteran of 160 missions during 28 months service in the European theater, parachuted to safety, although he was seriously injured, according to word received by Mr. Majors from Major Conger's wife. Major Conger has been serving as an instructor at Clovis Army Air field, N. M. The son of Mr. and Mrs. Albert Conger, former San Bernardino residents and now of Piedmont, the young major was credited with destroying 186 enemy planes during his service in the European theater. [Conger is credited with 11.5 kills with the 56th Fighter Group. - Ed.] His wife reported that the accident which resulted in serious burns and bruises for Major Conger occurred last week when he was diving his plane from an altitude of 10,000 feet. At 1,500 feet, a wing came off and tore through the canopy. Despite his serious injuries, Major Conger somehow got his parachute open and landed safely. He was rushed to a hospital where he is believed recovering."

28 July
US Army Air Forces North American B-25D-20 Mitchell bomber 41-30577 ("Old John Feather Merchant") crashed into the 79th floor of the Empire State Building in fog at 9:49 am, killing three on the plane 11 on the ground and causing over US$1 million in damage.

A Ford CG-4A-FO glider, 45-16072, of the 809th Base Unit, Camp Atterbury, Indiana, crashes at Paducah-McCracken County Airport, Paducah, Kentucky, killing the two crew. "Airport officials said that the plane towing the glider was forced down in a rain storm and that the pilot, seeing that the glider could not clear a clump of trees, cut it loose from the plane." KWF are pilot Major George S. Branson, 33, of Rock Hill, South Carolina, and Sergeant Maurice J. Aucoin, 21, of Houston, Texas. "Next of kin have been notified, and an investigation by a board of officers has been called to determine the cause of the crash."

31 July
Eight crew members and International News Service correspondent John Cashman, 27, were killed when their Consolidated B-24 Liberator exploded on take-off from Okinawa. Cashman, who lost his left arm to an ammunition explosion while on Navy sea duty in the Atlantic in May 1942, was honorably discharged in December of that year. He later became a sportswriter and correspondent for the INS, was sent to Guam in February 1945 and covered the invasion of Borneo. Cashman was en route from Borneo to Guam to cover the experiences of XXI Bomber Command crews over Japan when he was killed. A military funeral was held for Cashman on Okinawa, attended by high naval officers, on 1 August.

1 August
USAAF Canadian Vickers OA-10A Catalina 44-34096, en route from Hunter Field, Georgia, to Mather Field, California, crashed in the Cibola National Forest 25 miles southwest of Grants, New Mexico after an apparent engine failure, killing its seven crew members: Lt. Wilson Parker, Lt. William Bartlett, Lt. James Garland, Sgt. Irwin Marcus, Sgt. Robert Crook, Sgt. Harold Post and Sgt. John Jackson. The airframe was so badly damaged that no determination of the cause could be made.

2 August
Lockheed YP-80A Shooting Star 44-83029 (c/n 080-1008) of the 1st Fighter Group as of April 1945 crashed near Brandenburg, Kentucky, killing pilot Major Ira Boyd Jones, 25, of Lancaster, South Carolina. The plane left Wright Field in Ohio shortly after 2 pm on a routine test flight to an unspecified army air field in Texas, said Brig. Gen. Joseph T. Morris, commanding general of Wright Field. "Eight-year-old Chester and Martha Smedley, 14, of near Brandenburg, said they saw a 'big explosion' in the sky. Their father, Sheriff Alex Smedley of Meade county [sic], added that the explosion blew the wings loose from the fuselage, landing 200 or 300 feet apart. Maj. Jones' body, the sheriff said, was found about a quarter of a mile from the wreckage." Maj. Jones, a fighter pilot with 11 months of service in the China-Burma-India theatre, was attached to the fighter test branch at Wright Field. The son of Mrs. Mary C. Jones of Lancaster, South Carolina, he was a graduate of the University of South Carolina. The airframe was one of the test P-80s shipped to Foggia, Italy in December 1944 for tests by Wright Field personnel under combat conditions.

3 August
Four USAAF crewmen were killed as two Douglas A-26 Invaders collided and crashed in a field three miles northeast of Bennettsville, South Carolina. "The planes were flying formation with 10 others en route to the Florence army air base when the accident occurred, Police Chief John L. Watson reported." A-26B-10-DL (41-39130, piloted by 2d Lt. William D. Napier of Sultana, California) and A-26B-20-DT (43-22432, flown by 1st Lt. Julian A. Benson of 728 Wynewood Road, Philadelphia), both of the 127th Base Unit, Florence Army Airfield, were described as coming down five miles northeast of Bennettsville. Also killed were Sgt. James Collins Jr., son of James J. Collins Sr., of 827 6th Avenue, N., Fort Dodge, Iowa and Sgt. Robert L. MacNeil, son of Mrs. Margaret MacNeil, 111 Smith Street, Roxbury, Massachusetts. Lt. Benson was survived by his widow, Mrs. Hope L. Benson. Lt. Napier was survived by his widow, Vera E. Napier. It was unclear from news accounts which enlisted man was in which plane. "The accident was the second mid-air collision in South Carolina within a month. An Eastern Airlines Transport and an army plane crashed 80 miles from Columbia on July 12, killing three persons."

5 August
The first production Martin JRM-1 Mars flying boat (BuNo 76819, "Hawaii Mars") crashed on a test flight in the Chesapeake Bay near Rock Hall, Maryland, after porpoising during landing; it was never delivered to the United States Navy. "Launched only two weeks ago, the Hawaii Mars was on a routine test flight over the bay when, a crewman said, the upper section of the plane's vertical fin broke away at an altitude of 6,000 feet. 'The ship began to flutter immediately and went out of control,' the crew member added, asking that his name not be used. 'The pilot cried out 'prepare to abandon ship.' But pilot William E. Coney, a navy flyer on loan to the Martin firm, regained partial control of the giant craft and some ten minutes later ordered 'stand by for crash.' The plane struck the water about 500 yards offshore. The impact of the 125-mile-an-hour blow ripped open the metal hull, and the plane sank until only part of its tail and left wing remained visible. Two crew members trapped in the flight deck were rescued by companions who ignored the danger of a gasoline explosion. Small boats that sped to the crash scene took the ten to shore. R. S. Noble, flight test engineer, was taken to South Baltimore hospital with cuts, bruises and possible internal injuries. A navy announcement in Washington said the plane would be taken to the Martin plant." Noble was the only man injured. "Witnesses said the plane, apparently having trouble with one of her four engines, came down 500 yards offshore, parts of it remaining above water."

A Boeing TB-17G Flying Fortress built as a B-17G-70-BO (43-37700) of the 325th Combat Crew Training Squadron, Avon Park Army Airfield, Florida, crashed six miles south of Ridgeland, South Carolina after the number-two (port inner) engine caught fire at 10,000 feet during a flight from Stewart Field in New York to its home base in Florida. Pilot Lieutenant Dewey O. Jones ordered the crew to abandon ship. An announcement released by the Hunter Field, Georgia, public-relations office said that five parachuted safely, three were killed, and two other men were missing. Listed as fatalities were Flight Officer Alfred Ponessa of Newburgh, New York (a passenger) and crew members Sergeant Leo B. Bucharia of Long Island, New York and Technical Sergeant Edwin S. Salas of Haverhill, Massachusetts. The missing were listed as Lieutenant William Cherry and Corporal Sidney Podhoretz (addresses not available). The names of the other four survivors were not given.

6 August
All-time high-scoring American flying ace (40 credited kills) Richard Bong was killed trying to bail out of Lockheed P-80A-1-LO Shooting Star jet fighter 44-85048 after a fuel-pump failure during a test flight at Burbank Airport in Burbank, California. News of Bong's death was overshadowed by the dropping of the first nuclear weapon on Hiroshima the same day. The never-completed Richard I. Bong Air Force Base in Wisconsin was named for him.

8 August
Off the coast of Cuba, light cruiser USS Little Rock lost Curtiss SC-1 Seahawk seaplane BuNo 35555 during an aircraft launch and recovery operation. The aircraft nosed over while taxiing towards the recovery sled, throwing pilot Ens. W. R. Merryman clear of the cockpit, and capsized. Merryman was rescued by the ship's whaleboat, and the airframe sank.

Flying over Milton, Florida, B-29-70-BW Superfortress 44-69973 of the 326th CCTS, MacDill Field, Florida, encountered heavy rain. This led to three spirals, the third of which caused the wing to disintegrate from the aileron out; the pilot called for the crew to bail out. The plane crashed in swampland seven miles east of town (according to one source), or seven miles west (according to another). Eleven of the twelve crew members safely parachuted out, including the co-pilot (freed by the pilot from the bomb hatch). The pilot, Robert A. Lane, could not escape and went down with the plane. The crew was on its final flight before its scheduled deployment to Japan.

9 August
"Crashing into a power line five miles west of Corona at 5:22 p. m. yesterday (9 August) a Navy Corsair plane on routine flight from Los Alamitos fell into a river bed and burned, instantly killing the pilot. The identity of the pilot was withheld by naval authorities pending notification of first of kin. There was a short curtailment of electric power in the district served by the line. Navy authorities were investigating the crash last night."

11 August
"Lisbon, Aug. 11 (UP) - A B-17 Flying Fortress en route to the United States from London via the Azores with 20 men crashed at sea 320 miles off Cape Finisterre today."

North American TB-25J Mitchell 44-31401 (c/n 108-37376, built as B-25J-30/32-NC and converted) of the 3036th AAF Base Unit, Yuma Army Airfield, Arizona, piloted by Robert L. Laird, crashed into a mountain 25 miles south-southwest of Yucca Army Airfield in Arizona on a training flight from Yuma AAF. Its five-person crew was killed.

"Yuma, Arizona, August 15 (UP) - Twin brothers were among five Army men killed in the crash of their B-25 plane into Powell peak near Topock, Arizona Saturday, officials of the Yuma Army airfield revealed today. The 20-year-old twin brothers were Second Lts. William G. Winter and John R. Winter, sons of William L. Winter, of Towanda, Pa. The twins were radar observers."

The first of only two Nakajima Kikka twin-jet fighters, completed on 25 June and first flown on 7 August for eleven minutes by Lt. Cdr. Sasumu Tanaoka out of Kisarazu Naval Air Base, crashed on its second flight. The second unflown Kikka was shipped to the United States after the Japanese surrender.

17 August
During Operation Dodge (the RAF airlift of troops home from Italian deployment), Avro Lancaster ME834 (coded KO-G) of 115 Squadron based at RAF Graveley struck HK798 (coded KO-H) of the same squadron and PB754 (coded TL-A) of Graveley-based 35 Squadron when it swerved off runway while taking off from Bari.

Two Boeing B-29 Superfortress bombers collided over Weatherford, Texas during a night bomber training exercise. Eighteen crew members were killed, and two parachuted to safety. An Associated Press account said that some crew who bailed out had their chutes set alight by fiery wreckage, and fell to their deaths. Residents of the town were panicked by the collision overhead. "The explosion shook Weatherford. The skies were full of pieces of burning planes. The glare was seen 20 miles away. Some had a first impression that the town had been hit by a Jap balloon bomb."

Boeing B-29A-10-BN Superfortress 42-93895 of the 234th Combat Crew Training Squadron, Clovis Army Air Field, New Mexico, and Boeing B-29B-40-MO Superfortress 44-86276 (the last Block 40-MO airframe) of the 231st Combat Crew Training Squadron, Alamogordo Army Air Field in New Mexico were involved.

18 August
The last U.S. air-combat casualty of World War II occurred during mission 230 A-8, when two Consolidated B-32 Dominators of the 386th Bomb Squadron 312th Bomb Group launched from Yontan Airfield on Okinawa for a photo-reconnaissance run over Tokyo. Both bombers were attacked by Japanese fighters from the 302nd Air Group at Atsugi and the Yokosuka Air Group, which made 10 gunnery passes. Japanese aces Sadamu Komachi and Saburō Sakai were part of this attack. A B-32 piloted by 1st Lt. John R. Anderson was hit at 20,000 feet; cannon fire knocked out the number-two (port inner) engine. Three crew members were injured, including Sgt. Anthony J. Marchione, 19, of the 20th Reconnaissance Squadron, who took a 20 mm hit to the chest and died 30 minutes later. Tail gunner Sgt. John Houston destroyed one attacker. Lead bomber Consolidated B-32-20-CF Dominator 42-108532 ("Hobo Queen II"), piloted by 1st Lt. James Klein, was not seriously damaged. The second Consolidated B-32-35-CF Dominator (42-108578) lost an engine, had its upper turret knocked out of action, and lost partial-rudder control. Both bombers landed at Yontan Airfield a little after 6 pm, surviving the last air combat of the Pacific War. The following day, propellers were removed from the Japanese aircraft as part of the surrender agreement. Marchione was buried on Okinawa on 19 August; his body was returned to his Pottstown, Pennsylvania home on 18 March 1949, and he was interred in St. Aloysius Old Cemetery with full military honors. The B-32 42-108578 was scrapped in Kingman, Arizona after the war.

19 August
Pilot 1st Lt. James K. Holt ferried captured Messerschmitt Me 262A 500098 ("Cookie VII", FE-4011) from Newark Army Air Base in New Jersey to Freeman Field in Indiana with a refuelling stop in Pittsburgh at about 4 pm as one of two Messerschmitts being sent for testing after arriving in the U.S. aboard HMS Reaper. Landing in Pittsburgh, his brakes failed; he overran the runway, went down a steep incline and hit the side of ditch, tearing the engines and undercarriage off the jet and breaking the fuselage in half. The pilot was unhurt, but the airframe was a total loss.

22 August
"San Diego, Aug. 22 (AP) - A Navy patrol bomber exploded in midair today and crashed into the sea 20 miles southwest of here. Names of the crew of 10 were withheld. A Navy submarine tender, witness of the crash, launched a boat but found no survivors." Consolidated PB4Y-2 Privateer BuNo 59885 of VPB-197, operating from NAAS Camp Kearney, California, was the airframe destroyed.

24 August
The second (of two prototypes) McDonnell XFD-1 Phantom, BuNo 48236, was damaged in a belly landing.

28 August
Consolidated Consolidated B-32-20-CF Dominator 42-108528 of the 386th BS, 312th BG, crashed east of Amaro-O-Shima in the Ryukyu Islands after engine failure. Eleven of the 13 aboard survived one of World War II's last missions. Consolidated B-32-20-CF Dominator 42-108544 was written off when it lost an engine on takeoff from Yontan Airfield on Okinawa. It skidded off the runway, exploded, and burned; thirteen people were killed.

29 August
The temperamental Wright R-3350 Duplex-Cyclone powerplant, prone to overheating and fires, led to the loss of Boeing B-29-40-MO Superfortress 44-86274 of the 421st AAF Base Unit at Muroc Army Airfield in California (flown by Julius H. Massen) when an engine burned. The crew of eleven bailed out 20 miles southeast of Muroc, according to the Aviation Archeology database. "Muroc, California, Aug. 29 (AP) - A crewless B-29 plane headed for the Pacific ocean today after its 11-man crew bailed out when one of the huge ship's engines caught fire, Muroc Army air field officers said. All members of the crew were reported to have landed safely near Lancaster."

2 September
"The Navy and the Marine Corps last night (7 September) disclosed that a Marine lieutenant flying a Hellcat pursuit plane was missing in the Mojave desert [sic] since Sunday. Daily searches by Army, Navy and Marine planes have yielded no trace of the missing ship or its pilot, First Lt. Herbert L. Libbey of Tomaston, [sic] Maine. Lieutenant Libbey left Las Vegas, Nev., at 4:15 p.m. Sunday en route to the Marine Corps air base at Mojave. He was last seen flying over Searles lake [sic], near Trona. The country between Searles lake and Mojave is sparsely inhabited and includes large tracts not reached by roads or trails. Persons with any clues to the whereabouts of the plane or pilot have been asked to telephone Mojave 140 collect; or Franklin 7321 at San Diego. The military search for Lieutenant Libbey has been carried out over a constantly-widening territory, much of it far off of the supposed line of flight. The Navy public information office of the eleventh naval district at San Diego indicated that points as far distant as the Inyo and Colorado deserts and various desert mountain ranges were being searched. No ground hunt has been made." Lt. Libbey had flown F6Fs with VMF-124 from USS Essex F6F-5 BuNo 71033 of VMF-255's wreck was found 13 June 1957. 1st Lt. Herbert Lee Libbey was killed when he crashed 20 miles north of Wildrose Ranger Station in the Panamint mountains.

7 September
"San Diego, Sept. 7, (UP) - A stunting naval fighter plane today struck a power line, crashed through a garage and slashed off a corner of a house in the east San Diego district, police reported. The pilot was killed instantly."

9 September
Consolidated B-32-20-CF Dominator 42-108532 ("Hobo Queen II") was damaged when the nose wheel accidentally retracted on the ground at Yontan Airfield, Okinawa. Two days later, a hoist lifting the B-32 dropped it twice. Since the war had ended, it was not repaired but was disassembled at the airfield.

12 September
On the first flight of Northrop XP-79B 43-52437 out of Muroc Army Air Base in California, the aircraft behaved normally for about 15 minutes; at about 7,000 feet, it began a slow roll from which it failed to recover. Pilot Harry Crosby bailed out at 2,000 feet, but was struck by the revolving aircraft and his chute did not deploy. The largely-magnesium airframe was consumed by fire after hitting the desert floor.

1st Lt. Robert J. Anspach attempted to ferry captured Focke-Wulf Fw 190F FE-113 (coded 10) from Newark Army Air Base in New Jersey, where it had been offloaded from HMS Reaper to Freeman Field in Indiana for testing. During a refuelling stop in Pittsburgh, a faulty electrical horizontal-trim-adjustment switch went to the full-up position and could not be manually overridden. The pilot saw a small dirt strip (Hollidaysburg Airport, south of Altoona, Pennsylvania), and made an emergency landing. The right brake failed; the fighter pivoted left, the landing gear collapsed and the propeller ripped away. The pilot was uninjured, but the Fw 190 was hauled to the Middletown Air Depot in Pennsylvania; the propeller ended up on the wall of a local flying club. The press never heard about this accident or the 19 August Messerschmitt Me 262 crash-landing in Pittsburgh.

14 September
A hurricane destroyed three wooden blimp hangars at Naval Air Station Richmond in Florida, southwest of Miami, with 140 mph (230 km/h) winds. The roofs collapsed, ruptured fuel tanks were ignited by shorted electrical lines, and fire consumed twenty-five blimps (eleven deflated), 31 non-Navy U.S. government aircraft, 125 privately-owned aircraft and 212 Navy aircraft. Thirty-eight Navy personnel were injured, and a civilian fire chief was killed. Air operations were reduced to a minimum after the storm, and NAS Richmond was closed two months later.

15 September
USAAF Douglas C-47B-45-DK Skytrain 45-1011 (c/n 17014/34277) of the 561st Base Unit, Ft. Dix AAF in New Jersey, piloted by James E. Wuest, crashed on take-off one mile west of Kansas City killing 23 of the 24 aboard. "KANSAS CITY, Sept. 15 (AP) - Only one of 21 homeward-bound European war veterans, passengers aboard a military air transport plane which crashed early today remained alive tonight - and his condition was critical. A crew of three died in the craft which crashed and burned only a few seconds after it took off from Fairfax airport. Three of the veterans were alive when rescue parties reached the charred wreckage on the north bank of the Missouri river. Of these, Sgt. Bernard C. Tucker, Etna, California, and Cpl. Fred Ebert, Pasadena, died later at a local hospital. Sgt. Ora DeLong, whose papers indicated he had relatives at Fort Scott, Kan., Winfield, Kan., and San Bernardino, California, remained alive this afternoon but his condition was described as critical. The big Douglas C-47 plane had just left the runway at the local airport after refueling to continue its flight westward from Newark, N. J. Witnesses said one engine sputtered as the craft left the field. The ship made it across the Missouri river, immediately north of the field lost altitude rapidly and topped a tree on the bank of the river. One wing caught the embankment of the Burlington railroad tracks and the ship caught fire, falling in flames north of the track."

17 September
"First Lt. Kenneth Robert Frost was killed early yesterday afternoon (17 September) when his P-38 fighter plane crashed approximately 40 miles north of the Army Air field at Daggett. Lt. Frost, attached to the 444th Army Air force bombardment unit, [sic] was the son of Percy O. and Louise Frost of Los Angeles. A qualified board of officers will be appointed to investigate the cause of the crash, Army officers said." Lost was P-38L-1-LO, 44-24492, listed as from the 444th Combat Crew Training Squadron. The crash site was about 25 miles northeast of Yermo (according to the Aviation Archeology database), or from the 444th AAF Base Unit with the crash site 30 miles northeast of Daggett (listed by Joe Baugher).

18 September
USAAF Lockheed C-69-5-LO Constellation 42-94551 belly-landed at Topeka Army Air Field in Kansas after experiencing engine problems.

Consolidated TB-24J Liberator, built as B-24J-1-NT 42-78549 from the 425th AAF Base Unit at Gowen Field in Idaho, piloted by William P. Bordemer, experienced engine failure and crashed 38 miles (61 km) north of Deeth, Nevada. "Elko, Nevada, September 18 (AP) - One crewman and possibly three parachuted to safety from a Boise-based B-24 bomber which crashed today 30 miles north of Deeth, Nev., a search plane reported tonight. Lew Gourley, piloting a Piper cub, [sic] who first discovered the bomber's wreckage, said he saw one flier hanging unconscious in the harness of one 'chute and that two other 'chutes had been sighted. 'The man who was still in the 'chute harness in the morning has apparently come to,' Gourley said after a second flight to the scene. 'He was extricated from the 'chute and sat up and waved to us.'"

22 September
On the first day of a planned two-day exhibition of captured German aircraft at Freeman Field in Indiana, pilot Lt. William V. Haynes, 20, completed his routine in one of the eight remaining Focke-Wulf Fw 190s at the base (the same Fw 190D-9, Werke Nummer 211016, coded FE-119, which he ferried from Newark, New Jersey, to Freeman on 13 September) when, as he prepared to land (at about 300 feet), the aircraft pitched up, rolled over and bellied into the ground nose-up. The aircraft was destroyed, and the pilot killed. Although an investigation cited "pilot error" (it was thought that he might have attempted a wing-over at too low an altitude for recovery), it might have been another example of the faulty electrical horizontal-trim-switch problem which caused the loss of the Fw 190 at Hollidaysburg Airport in Pennsylvania on 12 September.

29 September
Silverplate Boeing B-29B-35-MO Superfortress 44-27303 ("Jabit III") of the 509th Composite Group, Wendover Army Air Field, Utah, on a cross-country training mission, struck several objects on landing at Chicago Municipal Airport and never flew again. Assigned to the 4200th Base Unit at the airport pending a disposition decision, it was salvaged there in April 1946.

== October–December 1945 ==
2 October
A U.S. Navy Martin PBM-5E Mariner flying boat (BuNo 59336) of VPB-205 carrying Rear Admiral William Sample, commander of Carrier Division 22, Suwannee Captain Charles C. McDonald and seven others, disappeared near Wakayama, Japan on a familiarization flight. They were declared dead on 4 October; the wreckage and their bodies were found on 19 November 1948.

3 October
Captured Focke-Achgelis Fa 223 V14, the first helicopter to fly across the English Channel on 6 September 1945 when it was moved from Cherbourg to RAF Beaulieu, crashed on its third test flight at RAF Beaulieu when a driveshaft failed. The accident was thought to be due to a failure to correctly tension the steel cables which secured the engine, despite warnings from Luftwaffe helicopter pilot Helmut Gerstenhauer.

12 October

USAAF Curtiss C-46F-1-CU Commando 44-78591 was on approach to Nanyuan Airport in China en route from Hankou when it struck a radio antenna and crashed near Beijing, killing all 59 passengers and crew. The crash was the worst involving a C-46.

1 November
The first prototype McDonnell XFD-1 Phantom (BuNo 48235) crashed as a result of aileron failure. Woodward Burke, McDonnell's chief test pilot, was killed.

3 November
Consolidated LB-30/Consolidated C-87 Liberator Express AL-640, assigned to the 1504th AAF Base Unit at Fairfield-Suisun Army Air Base and piloted by Norman C. Fisher, ran out of fuel 500 miles northeast of Honolulu en route to Fairfield-Suisun Army Air Base in California and ditched in the Pacific at 7:40 am (over four hours after it departed Hawaii) at about 25°25′N 149°50′W. It went down about 50 miles from regular patrol routes. Eighteen people were killed, and eight survived; surface vessels rescued the survivors from life rafts. Twenty-one passengers and six crew were aboard, including two women (one civilian and one WAC); one of the women was rescued. Seven bodies were recovered. Seven ships, including aircraft carriers, were involved in the search. On 11 January 1946, commanding general of the Pacific division headquarters in Honolulu announced the conviction of John R. Patrick, 27, of Tulare, California, on a charge of involuntary manslaughter for failing to "determine positively" whether the plane had been refueled before takeoff. Public-relations officers said that the court-martial which tried Patrick also convicted him of destruction of government property through "wrongful neglect". Patrick, a civilian, was one of the eight survivors. His defense, according to the public-relations office, was that he took precautions. Patrick was sentenced to six months of confinement and fined $2,000.

6 November
Ensign J. C. West took off from USS Wake Island in a Ryan FR-1 Fireball, of VF-41, a combination prop-jet design, and soon experienced problems with the Wright R-1820-72W Cyclone radial engine. Before the reciprocating power plant failed completely, West started the General Electric I-16 jet engine and returned to the ship (making the first-ever landing by jet power alone on a carrier). The escort carrier was operating off San Diego for pilot qualifications in the FR-1.

9 November
Disregarding advice from Eric "Winkle" Brown of the Fleet Air Arm (FAA) to treat the rudder of the Heinkel He 162 with suspicion due to several in-flight failures, RAF pilot Flt. Lt. R. A. Marks began a low-level roll in He 162A-2 (Wrk. Nr. 120072, AM61 during the Farnborough Air Show. One of the fin-and-rudder assemblies breaks off and the aircraft crashed in Aldershot before its ejection seat could be deployed, killing Marks.

11 November
A Short Stirling C.5 operated by No. 158 Squadron RAF was departing for the United Kingdom when it crashed on take-off from RAF Castel Benito in Libya after the wing caught fire. Twenty-one soldiers and five crew members were killed, and one person survived.

17 November
A USAAF Republic P-47N-15-RE Thunderbolt 44-88938, crashed between two houses on Windsor Parkway in Hempstead, New York shortly after take-off from Mitchel Field, setting both houses on fire. The morning accident killed pilot 1st Lt. Daniel D. A. Duncan, 24, of New Iberia, Louisiana.

26 November
"Tacoma, Wash., Nov. 26 (UP) - Coast Guard aircraft and small Navy boats tonight began a search of the ocean off Florence, Ore., for six crewmen who parachuted during a gale from a C-46 transport plane enroute from California to McChord field, Wash."

27 November
Douglas C-47B-1-DL Skytrain 43-16261 (c/n 20727), of Air Transport Command, piloted by 1st Lt. William H. Myers, disappeared during a flight from Singapore to Butterworth, British Malaya. The wreckage was found on a mountain slope in the forest reserve area of Bukit Bubu, near Beruas, Perak, Malaysia. The remains of the crew were recovered in August 2015. Also killed were Flight Officer Judson Baskett and PFC Donald Jones.

5 December
Flight 19, a training flight of 5 Grumman TBM Avenger torpedo bombers manned by 14 US Navy and Marine personnel from Ft Lauderdale Naval Air Station in Florida, vanished over the Bermuda Triangle under mysterious circumstances. The Avengers were four TBM-1Cs (BuNo 45714, FT3; BuNo 46094, FT36; BuNo 46325, FT81 and BuNo 73209, FT117) and TBM-3, BuNo 23307 (FT28). A US Navy Martin PBM-5 Mariner (BuNo 59225), carrying 13 sailors, departed from NAS Banana River in Florida to search for the missing planes and disappeared after a large mid-air explosion was seen near its last reported position.

13 December
A captured Dornier Do 335A-12 Pfiel (coded 121, werke nummer 240121), taken to England, was written off.

16 December
The second of two prototypes of the Douglas XB-42 Mixmaster (43-50225) on a routine flight out of Bolling Field in Washington, D.C. quickly experienced a landing-gear extension problem, failure of the port engine and (as the coolant temperature rose) failure of the starboard engine. Maj. Hayduck bailed out at 1,200 feet, Lt. Col. Haney at 800 feet, and pilot Lt. Col. (later Major General) Fred J. Ascani (after crawling aft to jettison the pusher propellers) at 400 feet. All three survived, and the plane crashed in Oxen Hill, Maryland. The secret, jettisonable propellers caused a problem for authorities in explaining what witnesses on the ground thought was the aircraft exploding. A fuel-management problem was speculated, but not proven.

== January–March 1946 ==
1 January
Budd RB-1 Conestoga NC45347 (c/n 003, ex-BuNo 39294), one of twelve purchased from the War Assets Administration by National Skyway Freight Corporation (former American Volunteer Group members) for $28,642 each when new C-47s cost about $100,000, belly-landed on a Bluefield, Virginia golf course after running low on fuel. The new company immediately sold four RB-1 aircraft, which paid for the WAA contract.

10 January
The first prototype Douglas XSB2D-1, BuNo 03551, had an engine fire 1,000 feet over Sunnyvale, California. The aircraft crashed in an orchard and sustained extensive damage, but the crew of two were uninjured.

18 January
A Dornier Do 335A-12 Pfeil (Arrow AM223, ex-DP+UB, wrk nr 240112), a twin-piston-engine "push-pull" aircraft out of RAE Farnborough, had a rear-engine fire in flight which severed the control runs. It crashed into the Cove School in Cove, Hampshire, killing two people (according to one source) and injuring six more on the ground. According to another source, pilot Group Captain A. F. Hards DSO was killed.

28 January
The first prototype Short Shetland I (DX166), the largest British-built flying boat, burned at its mooring from a galley fire before flight testing was completed.

1 March
Two Silverplate Boeing B-29 Superfortresses were written off in a taxi accident at Kirtland Army Air Field in New Mexico. The pilot of Boeing B-29-60-MO Superfortress 44-86473 of the 509th Composite Group assigned to Roswell AAF in New Mexico attempted to taxi without energizing the hydraulic brake system and could not stop the bomber, which collided with Boeing B-29-36-MO 44-27296 "Some Punkins" (also of the 509th). "Some Punkins" was destroyed in August 1946 fire-fighting training. The other plane was dropped from inventory in April 1946 after salvage.

7 March
Silverplate Boeing B-29-30-MO Superfortress 42-65387 from Kirtland Army Air Field in New Mexico, on a practice mission to the Los Lunas bombing range, released a 10,150-pound Fat Man before it disintegrated for unknown reasons and spun in from 32,000 feet. Ten crew members died, and wreckage was strewn up to 16 miles from the crash site. The B-29 which dropped the weapon in Operation Crossroads test Able on 1 July 1946 was named "Dave's Dream" for bombardier Dave Semple, who was killed in this accident.

17 March
A Republic of China Air Force Douglas C-47 Skytrain crashed into hills near Nanjing in bad weather, killing all 20 on board (including Lt. Gen. Dai Li [also known as Tai Li], head of Chiang Kai-shek's Military Intelligence Service). According to a CIA website, "Dai Li was dead, but many refused to believe it. Some blamed the crash on communist sabotage, others on a bomb planted by OSS. The most common rumor was that Dai Li had faked his own death. But Dai Li was dead, and it was bad weather that did it, not the OSS. He was buried on a hillside outside Nanjing, not far from Sun Yat-sen's mausoleum. In 1949, his remains were destroyed by the communists. A hero to some, a demon to others, Dai Li with his genius for organization had created the largest spying machine of its time, but reviews of its effectiveness are mixed." However, Jay Robert Nash wrote in Spies: A Narrative Encyclopedia of Dirty Trick and Double Dealing From Biblical Times To Today: "Tai Li was killed when his plane exploded in mid-flight, undoubtedly from a bomb planted by one of K'ang Sheng's agents."

19 March
Col. George V. Holloman, an aviation-instrument inventor and early experimenter with guided missiles, was killed in a Boeing B-17G-95-DL (44-83779, piloted by Major General James Edmund Parker) accident due to bad weather in Hokusekiko, Formosa (Taiwan), en route from China to the Philippines. Holloman had received the DFC for conducting the first instrument-only landing of an aircraft. Alamogordo Army Air Base in New Mexico was renamed Holloman AFB on 13 January 1948.

The wreckage of a Boeing B-29 Superfortress en route from Hickam Field in Hawaii to Hamilton Field in California was discovered by a private pilot on a 3,820-foot ridge 15 miles southeast of Livermore, California and 25 miles northeast of San Jose. The plane was unheard from after an 02:00 radio contact, and seven crew members were killed. Capt. J. M. Clark of the 1503d Army Air Forces Base Unit at Hamilton Field, flying a C-54 over the Livermore area, reported spotting the crash site at 17:15 and identified the plane by its serial number. A ground crew from Merced Army Air Field made its way towards the wreckage. Clark said that the B-29 pilot, apparently forced down with engine trouble after losing his way near the end of the flight, missed the top of the ridge by only ten feet. The tail and scattered wreckage was on top of the ridge, with the remainder of the plane scattered down the slope on the opposite side. Pacific Division Air Transport Command said that the B-29 was one of a group that were being ferried to the mainland from an advance base in the Pacific. An ATC officer said that the bombers are brought there (Honolulu) for a "routine check" before being turned over to new crews to be shuttled to the continental U.S. B-29-45-BA (44-83960), of the 1521st Army Air Force Base Unit at Hickam Field, was piloted by Fred S. Andes.

USAAF Douglas C-47B-50-DK Skytrain (45-1085, c/n 34355/17088) of the 3d MATW at Topeka Army Air Field in Kansas, piloted by Richard K. Young, en route from Stockton Army Air Field to Denver, crashed in the Sierra Nevada north of Lake Tahoe. All three crew members and 23 passengers were killed; all were Army and Navy personnel. The C-47 crashed in mid-morning, and some witnesses said that it exploded in the air. The fuselage landed near Hobart Mills, California, seven miles north of Truckee. Reno Army Air Base commanding officer Capt. Harold Simer, who reached the scene soon after game warden Bill La Mar arrived at about 15:30, said that the plane's starboard wing had not been found and might have dropped away first. He said that the plane had spiralled down crazily, striking a tree (which sheared off the port wing); the fuselage hit the mountain slope and nosed over, breaking open. There were no signs of life when La Mar arrived, either in the fuselage or outside the wreckage. All were in Army of Navy uniform and were, for the most part, intact. There was no fire. Snow in the hollow was over an average person's head in depth. Hobart Mills, a ghost town about a mile away with only a caretaker and his wife, was the nearest point to which a vehicle could approach the crash site. "Rescuers at once sent for caterpillar tractors and snow plows, and Capt. Simer said that night lights were also on the way so that the task of making a road among the big pines could go on in the dark. Clair Heater, caretaker at Hobart Mills, and three California highway maintenance workers from Sierraville, D. W. Roberts, Floyd V. Reed, and Tom Dewyre, all said they saw the plane apparently explode in the air and break into pieces."

28 March
Consolidated Liberator C Mk VIII KN760 of No. 159 Squadron RAF crashed on the airfield at Pegu, Burma (Myanmar) shortly after takeoff due to engine failure. The pilot attempted an emergency landing; the aircraft stalled and plunged to the ground, exploding on impact. Of the 21 personnel on board, 17 were killed; the other four were seriously injured.

31 March
The U.S. Navy reported on 1 April that Douglas R4D-6 Skytrain (BuNo 39100, c/n 32796/16048), assigned to the USMC Marine Air Wing 2 (MAW-2), Marine Air Group 25 (MAG-25), squadron VMJ-253, was missing on a routine flight in bad weather between Noumea, New Caledonia and Guadalcanal. The plane's wreckage was discovered on a mountain near Touho, New Caledonia.

== April–June 1946 ==
2 April
The Eleventh Naval District announced that U.S. Navy Ryan FR-1 Fireball (BuNo 39699) crashed in the Pacific about 40 miles off San Diego at 14:10, with the probable loss of pilot Ens. R. F. Krieger, of Coronado. The plane hit gunnery sleeve and crashed near Los Coronados Island.

4 April
"Washington, April 5 (AP) - Nine Navy men were killed in the Caribbean area yesterday when a bomb dropped in practice accidentally hit an observation tower, the Navy said today. The tower was located at the edge of an airfield on Culebra island, 16 miles off Puerto Rico.

5 April
A Fleet Air Arm Vickers Wellington (HE274) crashed into a residential area in Rabat, Malta during a training exercise, killing all four crew members and 16 civilians on the ground.

6 April
"Los Angeles, April 6 (AP) - Two Navy fliers were killed tonight when their two-engine dive bomber crashed in rain and heavy fog in the Palos Verdes hills. The bodies were burned."

The loss of a 100-piece Marine Corps art collection slated to become part of the permanent war record in a plane crash in New Mexico was announced in San Francisco. The exhibit, composed of battle drawings by Corps artists, was being flown to Philadelphia for exhibition with other war pictures. The plane crash killed eleven occupants, and destroyed all cargo.

8 April
Beechcraft C-45F Expeditor 44-8706 of the United States Army Air Forces 33d Army Air Field Base Unit, piloted by Woodrow W. Davis, crashed into Mount Diablo, California, killing both crew members. An Army search plane spotted the wreckage of the flight, which departed Oakland Airport at 11:05 for Los Angeles. "Lt. Stephen W. Cummings reported there was no sign of life, and that only the tail of the plane was visible in a ravine on the northwest slope of Mt. Diablo, [a] 3,849-foot peak 10 miles east of Oakland. The Army said only two officers were aboard when the ship took off in 'very soupy weather.'"

15 April
Consolidated TBY-2 Seawolf (BuNo 30314) ground-looped during a cross-wind landing at NAS Anacostia in Washington, D.C., sustaining minor damage.

24 April
Air Transport Command announced that six were killed when Douglas C-47-DL Skytrain 41-18530 crashed in the Tarawa atoll lagoon.

"West Greenwich, R. I., April 24 (UP) - Two Navy fighter planes collided in the air today and one of them crashed in flames on a home, killing a mother and her 2-year-old son. Both pilots escaped injury. Trapped in the blazing bungalow were Mrs. Eva Parenteau, 30, and her son, Raymond." Mrs. Parenteau's other two children, Phillip, 9, and Joseph, 8, were playing in a nearby yard and were not injured. The pilot of F4U-4 Corsair (BuNo 81416) bailed out after colliding with an F4U-4 (BuNo 81312), and his plane struck the home; the other fighter landed at NAS Quonset Point. Both aircraft were from VBF-82 on a training flight.

25 April
"Hayward, April 25 (UP) - Three Navy men were dead today in the crash of a twin-engine Navy transport in Redwood canyon, seven miles from Castro valley. Deputies from the Hayward sheriff's office found the charred bodies of the three men in the burning wreckage. Their names were withheld pending notification of next to kin. No other passengers were believed on board the plane."

5 May
"Spokane, Wash., May 5 (UP) - Airfield officials at Billings, Mont., said tonight at [sic] Sgt. H. D. Avery of Youngstown, Ohio, had parachuted from an overdue C-45 Army plane in trouble over Wilsall, Mont., but that the whereabouts of the plane and six other passengers was unknown. Air search attempts were hampered by bad weather. Avery said that he jumped on orders from Major D. L. Van Fleet, pilot of the plane, when the craft developed motor trouble over Wilsall. He said that none of the other passengers parachuted and the plane continued on its course." The wreckage had not been located by 10 May. Beechcraft C-45F (43-35681) of Air Materiel Command, Wright Field, Ohio, piloted by Maj. Dorence L. Van Fleet, was downed 37 miles north-northeast of Livingston. The C-45 struck Lobo Peak in the Crazy Mountains in a snowstorm, killing all six on board. The wreckage burned, and the bodies were badly charred. The survivor's correct name was Frank Avry.

10 May
On a mission out of NAS Pensacola in Florida, Consolidated PB4Y-2 Privateer (BuNo 59437) of VB-4 collided in midair with PB4Y-2 BuNo 59721 (also of VB-4) while in formation over Munson, Florida during joint training with an F6F Hellcat. As the fighter dove at the patrol bombers, they manoeuvered into a turn; the plane flying wing collided with the leader, knocking out one of the leader's engines. The lead plane went into a spin and crashed; the second PB4Y flew straight and level for a short time before it also spun in and crashed. The wreckage came down about eight miles north of Munson. The F6F notified nearby Whiting Field about the accident, and landed safely. Fourteen were killed on 59721, and 13 on 59437; one body in an unopened parachute was also found.

16 May
B-17G-95-VE Flying Fortress 44-85510 of the 234th AAFBU at Clovis Army Air Field in New Mexico crashed into White's Hill near Fairfax, California, en route to Hamilton Field in Marin County after running out of fuel. Two crew members were killed. A United Press account reported, "Seven Army men rescued from the twisted fuselage of a B-17 Flying Fortress fought for life tonight after the plane crashed into the rugged foothills of Mt. Tamalpais. Two others were killed. Two men, believed to have been the pilot and co-pilot, were thrown clear of the wreckage. Only semi-conscious, they walked and crawled four miles to a private residence. Hamilton field officials said all seven men's injuries were listed as critical and that they were being moved to Letterman General hospital, San Francisco, for treatment. Army salvage crews and hospital corpsmen cut their way through the metal fuselage to four men trapped in the pilot's compartment. The radio operator, semi-conscious and moaning for more than seven hours, was freed from the body of the plane at 9:30 a.m. He was the last man out." The pilot was listed as Warder H. Skaggs.

17 May
"Calcutta, May 22 (UP) - An American C-47 transport plane with 10 persons aboard and carrying 36 American war dead for reinterment has been missing between Akyab and Calcutta since May 17, it was revealed today." Douglas C-47B-1-DK 43-48308 (c/n 25569/14124), with three crew and eight passengers, struck a wooded hillside in Birmanipara, Tripura in a heavy storm while carrying the remains of Allied prisoners of war from Rangoon to Calcutta-Barrackpore. The wreckage was discovered on 16 December 2011 by 34 Battalion of the Indian paramilitary Assam Rifles. The site was found after a four-month search.

20 May
In an accident similar to the B-25 Mitchell hitting the Empire State Building in 1945, USAAF Beech C-45F Expeditor 44-47570 of the 4108th AAF Base Unit, Air Materiel Command, on a navigation-training flight from Lake Charles Army Air Field in Louisiana, crashed in fog at about 20:10 into the 58th floor of the Bank of Manhattan Trust Building at 40 Wall Street in New York City whilst attempting to land at Newark Army Airfield in New Jersey. Five crew members were killed. The War Department identified the dead as Maj. Mansel R. Campbell, pilot, Pontiac, Michigan; Capt. Tom L. Hall, Sioux Falls, South Dakota; 1st Lt. Robert L. Stevenson, Bronx, New York; 1st. Lt. Angelo A. Ross, Whitehall, New York; and 1st Lt. Mary E. Bond, W.A.C., Newtown, Pennsylvania. The flight, which had stopped in Smyrna, Tennessee, was last in radio contact with the Newark tower at 19:08.

A Grumman J4F-2 Widgeon amphibian out of NAS Brunswick in Maine made forced landing on Sebago Lake due to engine trouble, receiving moderate damage. The crew was uninjured.

23 May
Wilmington, Massachusetts: On the morning of May 23, 1946, two U. S. Navy F6F-5N Hellcat aircraft took off from the Squantum Naval Air Station for a tactical training flight. One of the aircraft (Bu. No. 70927) was piloted by Ensign Stephen J. Pilcher, 22; the other was piloted by his long-time friend, Ensign J. Thomas Holmes (22). Both men were from Wilmington, Massachusetts. Pilcher was not scheduled to fly, and was filling in for another pilot. The pilots flew to Wilmington, where they engaged in mock combat over the town. At about noon, Pilcher's plane entered a dive from about 1,800 feet and pulled out near the ground. Pilcher attempted to regain altitude; the plane went into a slow roll to the right before it nosed over and hit the ground. The plane exploded on impact, killing Pilcher instantly, in a wooded area in Wilmington's Nee Park section between Cedar and Harris Streets. After the accident, Holmes returned to Squantum.

25 May
"Honolulu, May 26 (UP) - Headquarters of Pacific division, Army Air forces air transport command, announced today that a C-54 Skymaster [was] missing between Kwajalein and Guam with five crew members. There were no passengers. Listed as part of the freight load was 8,600 pounds of mail." C-54G-1-DO 45-489 of the 1521st AAFBU, piloted by Louis L. Jernigan, was listed as missing near 12°45′N 149°5′E.

26 May
"Jacksonville, Fla., May 26 (AP) - At least four persons were killed when a Navy C-47 transport plane made a forced landing near Flagler Beach, the Florida state highway patrol reported tonight. The plane's four other passengers were injured, one critically, the patrol reported. The injured men were taken to a hospital at Daytona Beach. The plane was en route from the Jacksonville naval air station to Miami. W. H. Courtney of Daytona Beach, who said he was at Flagler Beach when the plane went down, reported the craft burst into flames while still in the air and that a 'sheet of flame' went up from the wreckage when it struck." R4D-5, BuNo 17144 (c/n 12334), was involved.

3 June
"San Diego, June 3 (AP) - Two Navy pilots were believed killed today when their Fireball pursuit planes collided five miles off the coast near San Clemente, 60 miles north of here. The Navy in reporting the crash said the accident occurred when the wing of one of the planes broke off and the other craft rammed the damaged plane. The two planes fell into the sea. The bodies were not recovered." FR-1s BuNo 38696 and 39677 were involved.

"Honolulu, T. H., June 3 (UP) - The Navy announced today that a B-17 Flying Fortress with 10 men aboard has disappeared between Kwajalein and Guam during an aerial search for a C-54 transport which has been missing with five aboard in the same area since May 25."

"Manila, June 3 (AP) - Philippine army headquarters reported today that eight persons were killed and six seriously injured in the crash of one of its C-47 transport planes, one mile north of Legaspi, southern Luzon."

20 June
A Vought F4U Corsair of Marine VMF-223 crash-landed at MCAS El Toro in California when the pilot apparently reached for the flaps lever and pulled the landing-gear lever, retracting the undercarriage.

== July–December 1946 ==
4 July
Pacific theatre pilot Lt. Col. John C. "Pappy" Herbst (18 credited victories) was fatally injured at age 36 in front of 30,000 spectators at the San Diego County Fair when his Lockheed P-80A-1-LO Shooting Star 44-85083 of the 445th Fighter Squadron, 412th Fighter Group, March Field in California crashed after failing to pull up in a dive just west of the Del Mar Fairgrounds while flying with an early-jet demonstration team. Herbst crashed in a dry riverbed near the Del Mar Racetrack after his aircraft stalled during an encore of their routine finale in which a pair of P-80s did a loop while configured to land. Herbst had married his second wife less than 24 hours earlier. His wingman, Major Robin Olds, narrowly avoided the same fate while flying in formation.

7 July
Howard Hughes was seriously injured when he mishandled a propeller-pitch control failure and crashed his Hughes XF-11 reconnaissance plane 44-70155 during its maiden flight. The aircraft struck homes in the Beverly Hills, near the Los Angeles Country Club golf course where Hughes was attempting an emergency landing.

8 July
The first of two Vought XF4U-5 Corsairs, created by mating Vought F4U-4 Corsair BuNo 97296 with a Pratt & Whitney R-2800-32W radial engine and first flown on 3 July 1946, was lost during a routine test flight when pilot Bill Horan attempted a deadstick landing in Stratford, Connecticut. The airframe was destroyed, and Horan was killed.

9 July

Eight USAAF crew, 15 U.S. Coast Guardsmen returning from duty in Greenland, one United States Public Health Service Commissioned Corps doctor, and one civilian were killed when their B-17G-105-BO Flying Fortress 43-39136, c/n 10114, crashed into Mount Tom in Massachusetts at about 22:20 while attempting to land at Westover Field. A monument to the victims at the crash site was dedicated on 6 July 1996.

11 July
The first of three Mikoyan-Gurevich I-300 prototypes (I for istrebitel, or interceptor), F-1, a twin-engine tricycle-geared jet-powered design first flown on 24 April 1946, developed an uncontrollable pitch during a high-speed run and crashed, killing pilot Alexei Grinchik. Replacement test pilot Mark Gallai had two close calls in an I-300 when the tailplane and elevator distorted, probably the same condition which killed Grinchik.

12 July
The unarmed second prototype of the Mikoyan-Gurevich I-250, with a strengthened tailplane after the crash of the first prototype on 5 July 1945, continued flight testing until an engine fire forced an emergency landing and damaged it beyond repair.

26 July
The crash of Stinson L-5E Sentinel 44-17844 during a routine flight out of Eglin Field in Florida killed Capt. Russell H. Rothman, originally from Chicago, when the liaison aircraft crashed 17 miles northwest of Valparaiso, Florida. Rothman, who began military service on 16 September 1941 and had flown 800 hours in C-46 Commando and C-47 Skytrain transports in the European theatre, had recently received an Army commission. He held the Unit Citation, the Air Medal with three clusters, the European and Middle East Theatre of Operations Ribbon, the American Defense Ribbon and the World War II Victory Medal.

29 July
The first Swedish pilot to use an ejection seat to escape a crippled aircraft, Lt. Bengt Johansson (who later changed his name to Järkenstedt), saved himself when his Saab J 21A-1 of 2 Divisionen, F9 Wing out of Säve collided with a FFVS J 22 of another F9 Division during naval gunnery-attack practice. While climbing after a gunnery pass, the J 21 was struck by the pursuing J 22 (shearing off one of its twin tails). With control lost, Johansson jettisoned canopy and ejected; the other pilot also bailed out of the crippled J 22. Both parachuted into the sea, where they were rescued by a Swedish navy destroyer. The contemporary Swedish press described the incident as a first, because the 13 January 1942 ejection by German Helmut Schenk from a Heinkel He 280 was little-known at the time.

5 August
The second of 14 built, Douglas C-74 Globemaster 42-65403 (c/n 13914) crashed in Torrance, California when it lost a wing during an overload dive test. All four crew members bailed out.

16 August
Captain Elmer Lee Belcher Jr. of Roanoke, Alabama was killed in a crash near Salinas, Ecuador. Belcher, stationed at France Field Canal Zone with the 20th Fighter Squadron of the Sixth Air Force, was flying P-47D 44-40191 by instruments in bad weather.

20 August

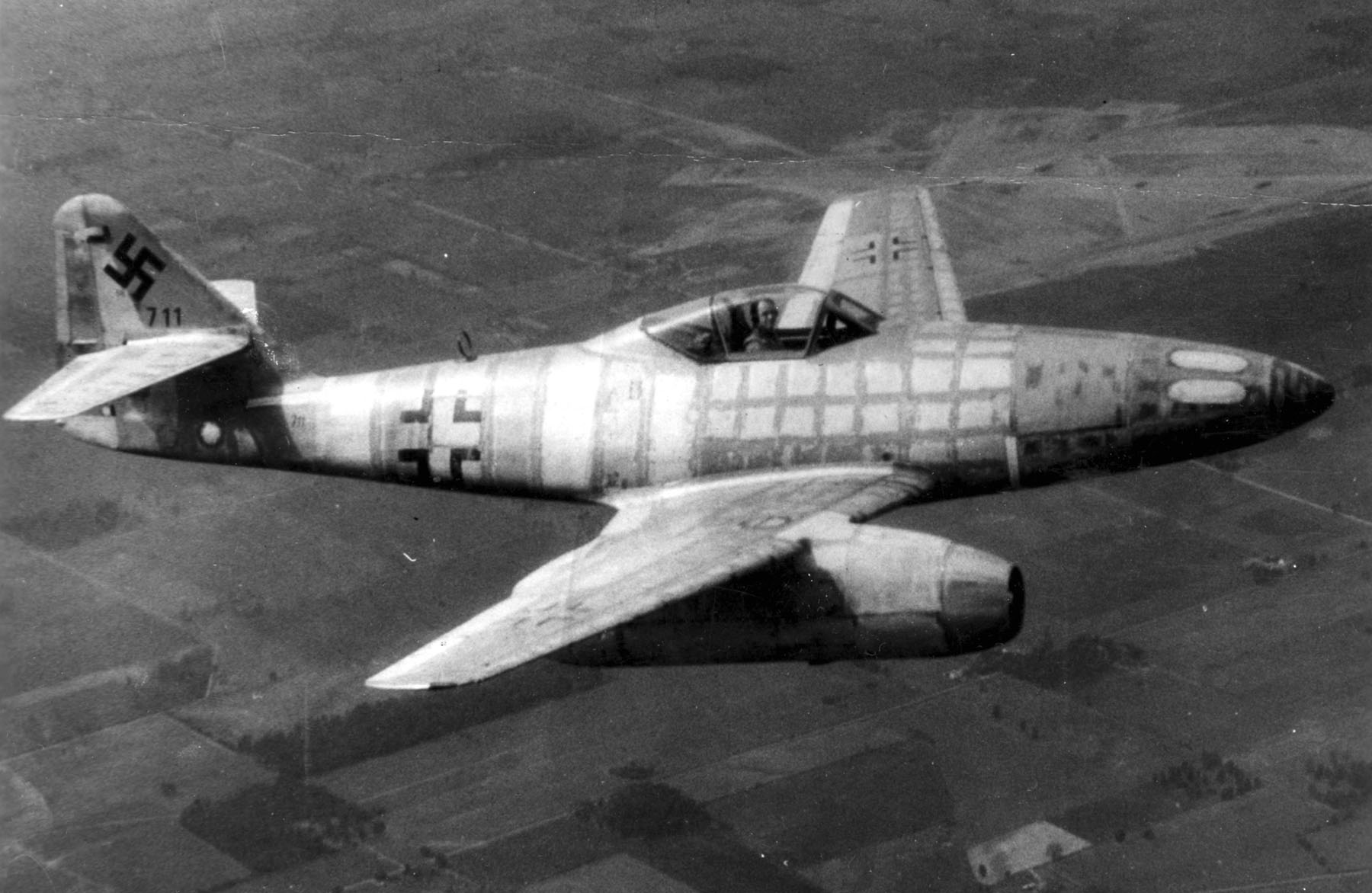
Me 262A, the first of its type to come into Allied hands, was lost near Xenia, Ohio on 20 August 1946.

A captured Messerschmitt Me 262A, Wrknr. 111711, FE-0107, 711, crashed Tuesday afternoon about two miles south of Xenia, Ohio, near Route 68. Test pilot Walter J. McAuley Jr. of the Flight Performance Section, Flight Test Division, Wright Field, Ohio, parachuted to safety. The new airframe had been surrendered on 31 March 1945 by Messerschmitt test pilot Hans Fay, who defected during a functional check flight rather than fly it to an operational unit (landing at Rhein-Main in Frankfurt). It was the first Me 262 to fall into Allied hands.

4 September
First prototype Bell XP-83 44-84990, bailed back to Bell Aircraft Company by the USAAF as a ramjet testbed and modified with an engineer's station in the fuselage in lieu of the rear fuel tank and a pylon for a test ramjet under the starboard wing, caught fire in the ramjet on a flight out of Niagara Falls Airport in New York. Flames spread to the wing, forcing Bell test pilot "Slick" Goodlin and engineer Charles Fay to bail out. The twin-jet fighter crashed at about 10:20 on a farm in Amherst, New York (about 13 miles from the airport), creating a crater about 25 feet in diameter.

6 September
The first prototype of the Avia S-92.1 Turbina, a Czechoslovak version of the Messerschmitt Me 262A-1a (standard Me 262s built from extant parts) crash-landed on its sixth test flight out of a former Luftwaffe base northeast of Prague. During high-speed runs at 13,125 feet (4,000 meters), the port engine flamed out; pilot Antonin Kraus, unable to get a relight, opted for a wheels-up landing in a field. The aircraft broke in two on landing (although Kraus was uninjured), and was a total write-off. For propaganda reasons, the second prototype (S-92.2) was reportedly the first true prototype; the first one was an experimental ship, and the first two-seater (the Avia CS-92.3), was declared the first series-production aircraft.

13 September
Major General Paul Bernard Wurtsmith of Strategic Air Command was killed when his North American TB-25J-27-NC Mitchell 44-30227 of the 326th Base Unit, MacDill Field, Florida, crashed at about 11:30 into Cold Mountain near Asheville, North Carolina. In February 1953, the United States Air Force named Wurtsmith Air Force Base in Oscoda Township, Michigan, in his honor.

27 September
Geoffrey de Havilland Jr. was killed when de Havilland DH 108 TG306 (the second prototype) broke up in flight, coming down in the Thames near Egypt Bay.

29 September
Blue Angels pilot Lt. (JG) Ros "Robby" Robinson was killed in Grumman F8F-1 Bearcat BuNo 95986, Blue Angels No. 4, at NAS Jacksonville in Florida when he failed to pull out of a dive during a Cuban Eight manoeuvre. A wingtip broke off his fighter.

1 October
RAF Bristol Brigand TF.1 RH744 failed to develop sufficient power on takeoff from RAE Farnborough, overran into soft ground and flipped over. There were no injuries, but it was the first Brigand to be written off.

William J. Smokovitz, flying a B-29A (tail number 45-21726) out of Grand Island AAF, in Nebraska, crashed in Buffalo Valley, Nevada.

12 November
"Santiago, Chile, Nov. 13, (AP) - Seven persons were injured last night when a United States army Douglas plane crashed in the Andes near Uspallain on a flight from Panama to Santiago. Two among the crew of five and four passengers were uninjured."

30 November
An Argentine Air Force Vickers VC.1 Viking T-1 crashed at El Palomar Airport in Argentina.

10 December
Curtiss R5C-1 Commando military transport BuNo 39528 (c/n 26715/CU355, ex-USAAF 42-3582) of VMR-152 crashed into Mount Rainier's South Tahoma Glacier near the 9,500-foot level, killing 32 U.S. Marines. The wreckage was not found until 22 July 1947. "Capt. A. O. Rule, commanding officer of Sand Point naval air station, said that the transport flew directly into the side of a sheer 3,000 foot cliff, exploded and threw parts and personnel over a wide area. 'In view of the nature of the glacier at the foot of this mountainside,' he said, 'little hope is entertained for the recovery of the bodies.'" "The ice and deep crevasses of Tahoma glacier high on Mount Rainier may have claimed forever the bodies of 32 Marines who died when their transport plane flew into the mountain last Dec. 10, it was indicated today (27 July) by the Navy and by searchers back from a second climb on the glacier. The climbers said they recovered additional evidence of the identity of the plane and saw much more wreckage that could not be reached, but failed to locate a single body."

Testing of the sole prototype CAC CA-15, A62-1001 (unofficially known as the Kangaroo, and first flown on 4 March 1946), ended when Flt Lt J. A. L. Archer experienced a hydraulic failure (later found to be a leaking ground test gauge) on his approach to Point Cook; Archer had no choice but to orbit and burn off fuel. The main gear was halfway down and unable to be retracted (or lowered) any further, but the tail wheel was down and locked. On landing, the tail wheel struck the airstrip first; this caused the aircraft to porpoise before the airscoop dug in. The aircraft settled back on the fuselage and skidded to a stop, heavily damaged. After repairs at CAC, it returned to ARDU in 1948. Since jets were entering service, no further development occurred and the airframe was scrapped in 1950.

30 December
U.S. Navy Martin PBM-5 Mariner flying boat BuNo 59098, supporting Operation Highjump, departed from seaplane tender USS Pine Island on a prolonged reconnaissance flight and crashed during a blizzard in Antarctica. Three crew members were killed, and six others were stranded for 13 days before they were rescued. The three who died (Ensign Maxwell A. Lopez, ARM1 Wendell K. Henderson, and ARM1 Frederick W. Williams) were buried at the crash site, and their remains have not been recovered.

== January–June 1947 ==
15 January
An RCAF Beechcraft with five Air Force personnel and one civilian aboard developed engine trouble and crashed about halfway between Watson Lake and Whitehorse, Yukon. All were killed.

20 January
"Rotan, Tex., Jan 20, (AP) - Two persons were killed and three injured in the crash of an army B-29 nine miles southwest of Rotan today. Six survivors parachuted from the craft, which was being ferried from Smoky Hil army air field, Salina, Kas., to Pyote, Tex., army air field. Three of these received only minor injuries. Lt. E. R. Henningsen, of Salina, pilot of the plane, who received minor cuts on his leg, identified the dead as Lt. Leonard J. Davenport of Ithaca, N. Y., and Tech. Sgt. Basil L. Joseph of Salina. Lt. Paul Taylor, the navigator, and Sgt. James W. Felkel also were injured."

A Douglas R5D Skymaster operated by the Naval Air Transport Service crashed while making a ground-control approach to fog-bound Oakland Airport, California, when it struck an embankment and disintegrated as it slid down the runway after the undercarriage was sheared off. Despite this, 20 of 21 aboard survived with injuries. A WAVE medical corpsman was the only fatality.

26 January
"Manila, Jan. 29 (Wednesday). (AP) - The 13th air force announced today that Lt. Calvin G. Fuller, Macon, Ga., and Cpl. Winfield H. Mobley, Hazelhurst, [sic] Ga., were killed Sunday in the crash of their training plane one mile north of the army's air base on Palawan."

27 January
United States Army Air Forces Silverplate Boeing B-29-36-MO Superfortress 44-65385 of the 428th Base Unit, Kirtland Army Air Field, New Mexico, for Los Alamos bomb-development testing, crashed immediately after take-off from Kirtland on a routine maintenance test flight. No specific cause was documented; a fire in one engine and the pilot's failure to compensate for loss of power was believed to have caused the accident. Twelve crew members were killed.

28 January
Two Vought F4U Corsairs collided in flight 12 miles south of Cecil Field in Jacksonville, Florida, killing one pilot and injuring the other when he bailed out. Lt. (j. g.) Jacob E. Lieb, USNR, 28, of Newhall, Iowa, was killed. Ens. Donald Loranger, USNR, 22, of Hanford, California, broke his leg bailing out.

"Roswell, N. M., Jan 28. (AP) - Capt. Shester H. Bohart, B-29 Superfortress pilot at Roswell army airfield, said he thought the shooting was all over. Now he's not so sure. Taxiing toward the runway, Bohart noticed a tire going flat. Inside the tire mechanics found an Indian arrowhead."

February
Second prototype Curtiss XBTC-2, BuNo 31402 of only two built, crashed at NATC Patuxent River in Maryland during testing of full-span duplex wing flaps and dual-rotation propellers.

18 February
The USS Cusk, the world's first submarine to launch a guided missile, fired a Republic-Ford JB-2 which crashed due to an apparent control malfunction after flying 6,000 yards.

21 February

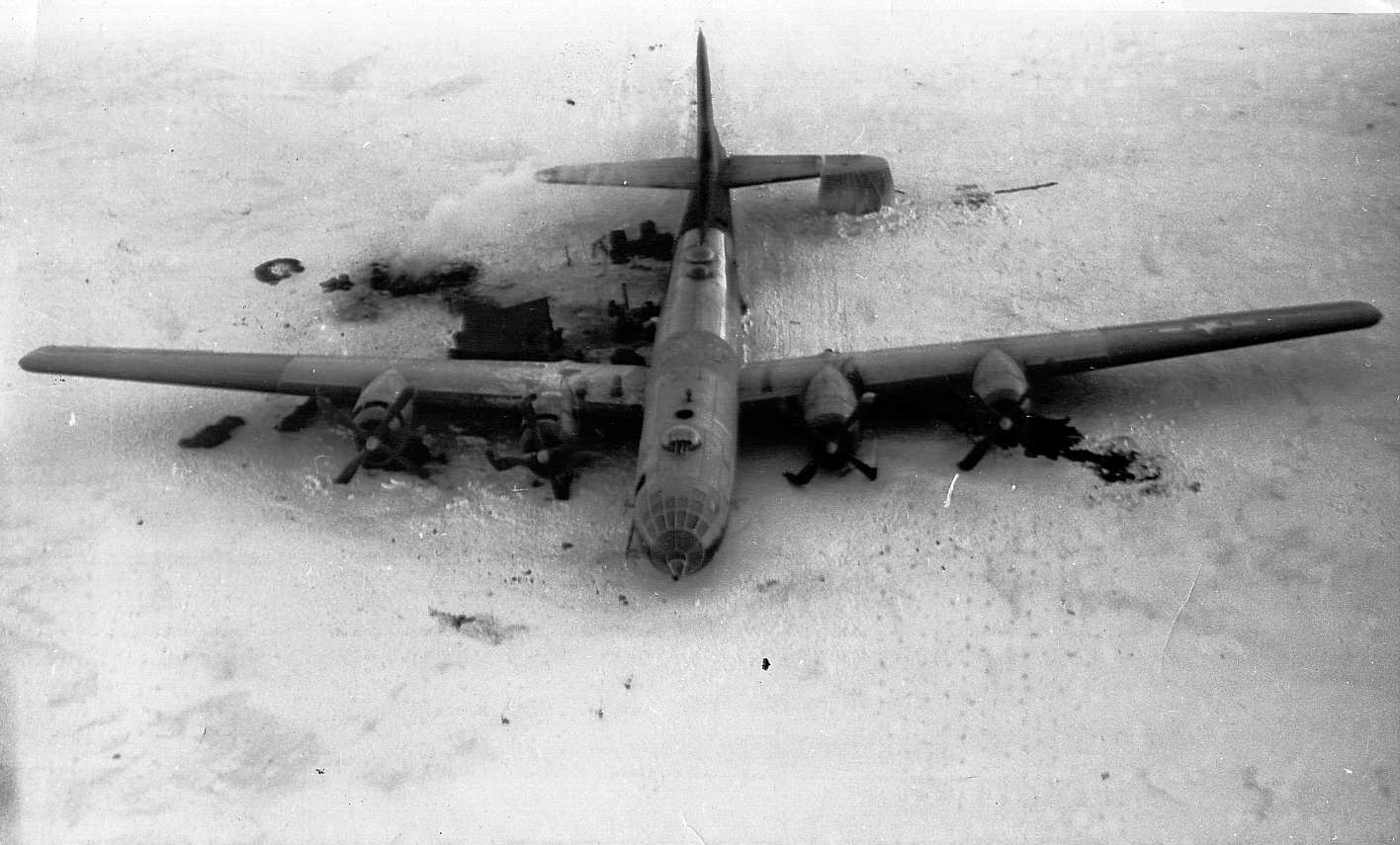
The Kee Bird down on the ice in February 1947

United States Army Air Forces Boeing B-29-95-BW Superfortress 45-21768 (the Kee Bird, modified for an F-13 reconnaissance role) of the 46th/72d Reconnaissance Squadrons, on a mission out of Ladd Field, Alaska, ran out of fuel due to a navigational error and was forced to land in a remote area of northern Greenland. The aircrew was rescued unharmed three days later, but the plane was abandoned in place. The accident is notable for the rescue and a well-publicized, disastrous 1994 recovery attempt.

7 March
Five airmen bailed out of a C-45 Expeditor at thunderstorm height when the plane ran out of fuel and crashed near Youngstown, Florida. According to a public-relations report, weather conditions forced the pilot to deviate from his original flight plan (a navigation-training mission to Nashville, Tennessee). Four of the airmen were rescued, but it took several days to locate the body of Maj. David A. Smiley of Tyndall Field.

26 March
Prototype Convair XB-36 Peacemaker 42-13570, on a test flight out of Fort Worth Army Air Field in Texas with two test pilots, seven Convair flight test crew, three US Army Air Force observers, and two employees of Curtiss-Wright (to run electronic tests on propeller vibrations, had an explosion of a hydraulic retracting strut as the starboard main gear came up. The nine-foot, two-inch main tire swung back down as dead weight and smashed the rear of the number-four engine nacelle, rupturing fuel and hydraulic lines. Twelve on board bailed out with various injuries from gusty winds; after six hours of flight to burn off fuel, pilots Beryl A. Erickson and Gus S. Green landed the bomber at Fort Worth with no additional damage. Repaired, with a redesigned strut, the prototype returned to flight testing two months later.

26 March
A De Havilland Mosquito heavy fighter of the Royal New Zealand Air Force crashed in bad weather off Sydney Island, in Australia's Gulf of Carpentaria, during its delivery flight from Singapore to New Zealand. The pilot, Wing Commander Bertie Hoare, and navigator, Flying Officer Walter Colvin, were killed.

5 April
Douglas C-47D Skytrain 44-76231, involved in an NAA mission, crashed in a field due to weather conditions. "The News-Review, Roseburg | Oregon, April 7 (AP) - Four men were killed when the transport struck a mountain near Decaturville, Tenn., on a flight from Washington D.C., to Memphis." The aircraft took off from a field of North American Aviation in California and crashed in Decaturville, Tennessee, killing four on board. The pilot was Col. James Linn Travis of Portland, Oregon, and the co-pilot was Capt. Bernard B. Brown. The other passengers were William Pounds and Kenton Case. Travis commanded a Flying Fortress group in the European campaigns of World War II.

9 April
Douglas C-47D Skytrain 43-49258, c/n 15074/26519 (built as C-47B-10-DK), assigned to the 43d Bomb Group, Davis-Monthan Field, Arizona, crash-landed shortly after takeoff from Kelly Field, Texas, injuring many on board. "San Antonio, Tex., April 9 (AP) - Twenty-one soldiers were injured seriously tonight when a C-47 transport plane crash-landed near Kelly field here. In the plane were Negro baseball players, members of an army team en route to Davis Monthon [sic] field at Tucson, Ariz. It was not known tonight if all passengers were members of the team. Maj. Robert Loomis, operations officer at Kelly field, said as far as he knew no one was killed in the crash. The plane had taken off from Kelly field a short time before the crash. Witnesses said the plane encountered difficulties in the take-off. It rose slowly from the runway, cleared residences adjacent to the base, and settled down in a cotton field." The Aviation Archeology website listed the pilot as Sumpson L. Rawle, and the website and Joe Baugher report that there were fatalities.

19 April
Boeing B-29A-85-BW Superfortress 44-87638, of the 30th Bomb Squadron, 19th Bomb Group, 20th Air Force, crashed and exploded one mile offshore at Kwajalein Island after take-off. Sixteen people were killed, and no bodies are recovered. One of the dead was Capt. Quitman B. Jackson, 24, of Columbia, South Carolina, a 1944 graduate of West Point.

8 May
North American P-51D-30-NA Mustang 44-74652 of the 77th Fighter Squadron, 20th Fighter Group, based at Shaw Field, South Carolina, crashed at about noon near Cassatt, South Carolina. Col. W. M. Turner, executive officer at Shaw Field, said that ambulances and firefighting equipment went to the scene but he was informed that pilot Max J. Christensen was not injured. Turner said that he was awaiting a full report on the crash.

15 May
A V-2 rocket launched from White Sands Missile Range LC-33, New Mexico, at 16:11 went 40 degrees off course due to a defective fin and crashed six miles east of Alamogordo, New Mexico.

17 May
A North American AT-6 Texan trainer aircraft operated by the U.S. Army Air Forces crashes south of Northwest Field, Guam, killing the two officers aboard.

18 May
A U.S. Navy pilot and two schoolboys were killed when a Vought F4U Corsair fighter crashed on a school playground in Burlington, Iowa, during an airshow at the Municipal Airport. The fighter, one of 35 aircraft from Lambert Field in St. Louis, performing a mock formation raid before 3,500 spectators to signal the start of National Naval Reserve Week, went into a series of barrel rolls and appeared to go out of control before it crashed on the playground at the Perkins School (where 14 children were playing ball). At least five others were injured, and several homes were struck by debris from the crash.

19 May
The crash of Beechcraft C-45F Expeditor 44-87142 of the 4000th AAF Base Unit, two miles south of Windsor, Ontario, killed three officers and two enlisted men from the 4140th Base Unit at Wright Field in Ohio who had left the base at 18:05 on a flight to Selfridge Field in Michigan to prepare air shows throughout the country. The twin-prop, twin-tailed aircraft came down in an open area during a rainstorm at about 21:05, and broke into six pieces. One crew member unsuccessfully attempted to parachute. The plane crashed less than 500 yards from St. Mary's Academy, on the outskirts of Windsor.

22 May
The third prototype of three Boeing XC-97 Stratofreighters (43-27472, c/n 8483), on a flight out of Wright-Patterson AFB in Ohio, came down in a wheat-stubble field five miles east of Dayton, Ohio and burst into flames. Five of the seven on board were killed.

29 May
A captured, modified V-2 rocket, the Hermes B-1, launched from White Sands Proving Grounds LC-33, New Mexico at 20:30 CST, failed to reach its maximum altitude and came down about three minutes later. It crashed in Tepeyac cemetery, about six miles south of Ciudad Juárez. Unburnt fuel exploded, and the blast was felt in Juarez and El Paso, Texas. Lt. Col. Harold R. Turner, commander at White Sands, confirmed by telephone the launch of the rocket but made no further comment.

Army Douglas C-54D-5-DC Skymaster courier plane 42-72553 (c/n 10658) of the 6th Troop Carrier Squadron, 317th Troop Carrier Group, 5th Air Force, with 33 passengers and eight crew, crashed into a mountain southwest of Tokyo. An Army announcement said that it had not been determined whether there were any survivors. A revised count reported that 40 were aboard the C-54: 28 enlisted, eight officers, and four civilians; all were killed in the crash, and reportedly burned beyond recognition. The flight, inbound from Korea, had apparently exploded as it approached Tachikawa Airfield for a landing.

Boeing F-13A Superfortress 45-21848 (c/n 13742) of the 46th Reconnaissance Squadron crashed shortly after take-off from Ladd Field in Alaska, coming down three miles east of Fairbanks, Alaska. Three crew were reported missing, and nine others were injured.

30 May
Twelve members of the Colombian National Army Aviation were injured in the crash-landing of their transport at Bogotá, after it collided in mid-air with a buzzard. Douglas C-47 Skytrain, Fuerza Aérea Colombiana FAC-661, is destroyed by fire after landing.

4 June
A U.S. Marine Corps Vought F4U-4 Corsair crashed in the surf at Atlantic Beach, North Carolina during a VFW airshow; pilot Lt. Gene Dial of MCAS Cherry Point, North Carolina, walked about 15 feet to shore unhurt. Dial, with 4 1/2 years of service, said that he had crashed once before during a carrier take-off.

14 June
Boeing B-29A-70-BN Superfortress 44-62228 of the 64th Bombardment Squadron, 43rd Bombardment Group, off-course in stormy weather, crashed into the granite face of Hawks Mountain a few hundred feet below its 2,300-foot crest near Springfield, Vermont just before midnight, killing all eleven crew. The bomber, based at Davis-Monthan AFB in Tucson, Arizona, had refueled Pittsburgh and was bound for Bedford, Massachusetts when it apparently became lost. Local residents reported hearing it circle over Springfield and nearby Perkinsville shortly before impact, and seeing it blink its lights at an altitude of 1,000 feet or less.

18 June
World War II ace Pierce McKennon (12 aerial victories and 9.83 ground victories) was killed in a training accident with a student pilot in AT-6D-NT 44-81417 of the 2532d AAF Base Unit, Randolph Field, Texas, when the trainer crashed two miles west of Marion, Texas.

22 June
Martin XB-48 45-59585 made its first flight (a 37-minute, 73-mile hop from Martin's Baltimore, Maryland plant to NAS Patuxent River), but blew all four tires on its fore-and-aft-mounted undercarriage on landing when pilot O. E. "Pat" Tibbs, director of flight for Martin, applied heavy pressure to specially-designed, slow-to-respond air-braking lever. Tibbs and co-pilot E. R. "Dutch" Gelvin were uninjured.

== July–December 1947 ==
1 July
An Army Air Force P-84 Thunderjet was flown by Maj. Wilbur J. Webb on a routine acceptance test from the Republic Aviation Corporation plant in Farmingdale, Long Island. Webb was flying at about 9,000 feet, cruising at about 600 mph (the plane's maximum speed). When he radioed that his engine was dead, he ditched the plane near a lighthouse between Cold Spring Harbor and Huntington Bay and was rescued.

3 July
USAF Douglas C-54G-1-DO Skymaster 45–519 (c/n 35972/DO366), en route from Bermuda to Morrison Field in Florida, crashed in the Atlantic 294 miles northeast of Florida after a loss of control due to storm turbulence. Its six crew members were killed.

7 July 1947 Navy fighter crashes into house on Faxon rd N. Quincy Ma. One fatality. Plane was heading for Squantum Naval Airbase.

18 July
"Carrizozo, N. M., July 18 (AP) - An Army pilot attempting a P-80 jet plane takeoff from a highway was killed and four other persons were injured today when his aircraft crashed into a service station and exploded. White hot flames erupting from the plane's 700-gallon fuel tanks destroyed station, aircraft and three automobiles. The flier's body was charred. 'We were lucky that more weren't killed,' said Sheriff Nick Vega, who was slightly burned in helping to rescue the injured. The gasoline station was as the north edge of this southern New Mexico town. There are no houses close by. At March field, California, Army air base the pilot was identified as Capt. Floyd G. Soule, 28, adjutant of the 73rd Fighter Squadron. His widow, Hilda, and three children reside at 3272 Oakwood Place, Riverside." P-80A-5-LO (44-85349) was listed in 1947 with the USAF 71st Fighter Squadron, 1st Fighter Group.

19 July
RAF Bristol Brigand TF.1 RH742, assigned to the A&AEE and piloted by F/L T. Morren, failed to pull out of a firing pass during an exercise in the Lyme Bay area off the Dorset coast. It began a slow roll, lost speed while inverted and dove into the sea, killing both crew. It was thought that one of the dive brakes might have failed, and it was the first fatal accident of the type.

21 July
"Buenos Aires, July 21, (AP) - Seventeen persons were killed today in the crash of an Argentine army four-engine transport plane as it took off, plunged into a crowd and burst into flames during army maneuvers at El Palomar airfield. Three of the victims, a government communique said, were civilian spectators. The other dead were military personnel and war department employes [sic]." Douglas C-54A-1-DO Skymaster, Fuerza Aérea Argentina T-44 (c/n 7463, ex-USAAF 42-107444),) could not gain altitude on takeoff. It ran through a crowd of spectators, crossed a railroad and caught fire. The airplane was to join a flight of about 200 other aircraft over the capital to celebrate the birthday of José de San Martín.

25 July
The first of two North American XP-82 Twin Mustangs (44-83886, c/n 120-43742) of the 611 AAF Base Unit crash-landed at Eglin Field, Florida.

26 July
Officers at NAS Los Alamitos reported that USMC 1st Lt. Leonard Smith, 25, of South Gate, California, was killed in the crash of a U.S. Navy Corsair while landing at the Seal Beach ammunition depot. There was no explosion.

29 July
Nine crew were killed and two injured in a failed take-off attempt by B-29-45-MO Superfortress 44-86307, from Eglin Field in Florida, at 08:13. The bomber came down about 300 yards north of the main base near Valparaiso, Florida and burned. Killed were instructor pilot Capt. Gordon W. Barrett of Pittsfield, Massachusetts, a West Point graduate who received the DFC for flying Boeing B-29 Superfortresses in World War II; pilot 1st Lt. Huddie C. Bagley of Braufield, Texas; co-pilot Capt. Robert M. Seldomridge of Lancaster, Pennsylvania; navigator 1st Lt. Joseph A. Anderson of Shalimar, Florida; navigator 1st Lt. Milton Rose of Fort Walton, Florida; engineer Master Sgt. Michele Aulicino of Mary Esther, Florida; scanner Staff Sgt. Hugh T. Mulholland of Philadelphia, Pennsylvania; scanner Cpl. Ashley W. Odom of McBee, South Carolina, and scanner Pfc. Donald D. Crawford of Fort Worth, Texas. Injured were scanner S/Sgt. Jeremiah W. Conlon of Worthington, Kentucky (admitted to the Eglin hospital with abrasions of the face and head and ankle injuries) and radio operator S/Sgt. Lloyd D. Farris of Pensacola, Florida, with minor injuries and admitted for observation. The Superfortress apparently failed to gain altitude before coming down, said base public-relations officer Capt. Robert Gaughan.

After July
First prototype Gloster E.1/44 SM809, its final assembly completed in July 1947 at Bentham Experimental Department, never arrived by road at the Aeroplane and Armament Experimental Establishment (A&AEE), Boscombe Down. En route, vehicle carrying it apparently jack-knifed while descending a hill and crashed into a stone wall; the airframe was damaged beyond repair. News of the accident alerted the British public to a new Gloster fighter design.

August
The first prototype Curtiss XBTC-2 (BuNo 31401) of only two built crashed at NATC Patuxent River in Maryland during testing of full-span duplex wingflaps and dual-rotation propellers. This was the last Curtiss aircraft built for the U.S. Navy.

1 August
"M'CHORD FIELD, WASH., Aug. 1 (AP) - The Army Air Force day observance was marred today by the deaths of Capt. W. L. Davidson, pilot, and Lt. Frank M. Brown, co-pilot, in the crash of their flaming B-25 bomber near Kelso, Wash., shortly after taking off on a night flight to Hamilton field, California. T/Sgt. Woodrow D. Matthews, crew chief, and Sgt. Elmer L. Taff, 24, Mertzon, Texas, a hitchhiker making his first plane flight, parachuted to earth several miles from the wreck scene. Matthews was critically injured." TB-25J-30/32-NC (44-31316), of the 400th AAF Base Unit, was based at Hamilton Field and piloted by William L. Davidson.

6 August
A Kodiak, Alaska-based U.S. Navy Consolidated PBY-5A Catalina, BuNo 34032, disappeared on a morning flight from Kodiak to Dutch Harbor, Alaska, with 15 passengers and five crew. The Seventeenth Naval District radioed headquarters that the amphibian reported that it was bucking heavy headwinds southeast of Fort Randall in the area of Cold Bay in a message to the Thirteenth Naval District. The PBY had six hours of fuel left at that time. All available aircraft and several ships were directed to search for the missing flight. The passengers were an Army-Navy football team. The PBY was not found, and a year later all aboard were declared dead.

27 August
Arabian Sea - On a ferry flight from Britain to New Zealand. Ferry Flight de Havilland Mosquito FB.VI. HR375 Sq/Ldr. Berney. Pilot: Sq/Ldr. Richard Bruce Berney AFC. DFM. MiD. DFC (USA). NZ/40750 RNZAF Age 30. Missing - believed killed. Nav: Fl/Lt. Bernard James Beadle NZ/426159 RNZAF Age 33. Missing - believed killed. On a ferry flight from Britain to New Zealand. Taking off during a leg at 10:19hrs from Mauripur in Pakistan en route to Santa Cruz, Bombay the escape hatch fell off. The crew landed back at the airport to have the undamaged hatch refitted. Then departed again. Nothing further was heard from the crew but it was believed to have crashed in the Gulf of Kutch during a monsoon storm. Later that day a Dakota taking part in the search sighted what appeared to be a wing in the Arabian Sea some 20 miles off Okha. A sloop was sent to the area to carry out a search but failed to find anything.

September
Gloster E.1/44, TX145, experienced extreme nose-wheel shimmy at 140 mph (225 km/h) during taxi tests at the Aeroplane and Armament Experimental Establishment (A&AEE), Boscombe Down. Its front end severely damaged, it was returned to the workshop for repair. Taxi trials were not resumed until late February 1948.

16 September
A pilot assigned to Eglin Field, Florida, was killed during an attempted emergency landing in a Lockheed P-80 at that base during the afternoon. Capt. Lawson L. Lipscomb of Houston, Texas, radioed that he was having difficulty with the jet and was returning to the Eglin main base (where emergency preparations had been made on the runways. The fighter came down just west of the airfield.

22 September
The first of four Saab J 21R jet conversions from Saab J 21A-1 21119, first flown on 10 March 1947 after modification, was destroyed in a mid-air explosion.

15 October
The second prototype Westland Wyvern TF Mk. 1 (N.11/44, TS375), powered by Rolls-Royce Eagle, crashed during an attempted forced landing at RAE Farnborough after its propeller stopped; Westland test pilot squadron leader Peter J. Garner, late of the RAF, was killed. The aircraft was to rendezvous for air-to-air photography for Flight's photographer John Yoxall, but a bearing failed; both contra-props stopped, and the pilot was unable to round-off properly from a steep dive. The plane crashed on the intended field and broke into pieces; the pilot was unconscious, and the airframe burned almost completely.

18 October
An RCAF North American B-25 Mitchell with nine aboard disappeared during a flight from Calgary to Penticton, British Columbia. The plane was still not found by December 1947.

3 November
English Electric test pilot Johnny W. C. Squier took off from Samlesbury Aerodrome in English Electric-built de Havilland Vampire F.3 VP732, intended for the RCAF as 17043. After his engine failed, Squier force-landed on a farm (narrowly missing trees). The fighter was wrecked, but Squier survived.

4 November
A USAF pilot and co-pilot belly-landed burning Boeing B-29-70-BW Superfortress 44-69989 of the 98th Bomb Group, in a wheat-stubble field south of Wilbur, Washington after they ordered the five crew to bail out. The bomber was on a flight from Robins Air Force Base in Georgia, to Spokane Air Force Base when an engine caught fire. Residents of Wilbur saw it circling with an engine afire as the pilot sought a place to put it down. The first communications to Spokane Field that it was in trouble came at about 15:00. Those who jumped were injured, but the pilot and co-pilot were unhurt.

13 November
Boeing B-29A-60-BN Superfortress 44-62063 of the 98th Bomb Group, Spokane Air Force Base, Washington, crashed and burned one mile west of Bald Knob on Mount Spokane along Dead Man Creek Road, killing five crew and seriously injuring two. The bomber, one of three flying in formation on a local training mission, cut a swath through trees and brush as it neared the ground. The other aircraft circled the crash scene and radioed news of the incident back to base. Flying conditions were poor, with fog and a snowstorm, but shortly after the crash the weather cleared. The last victim's body was recovered on 16 November.

17 November
"DANVILLE, Ark., Nov. 18 (AP) - Six charred and crushed bodies of army airmen were brought to a funeral home today from Arkansas' highest peak, Mount Magazine, where a B-25 crashed and burned last night during a heavy rainstorm. Maj. N. R. Johnson, flying safety officer at Barksdale field, La., expressed belief the plane bound from Chicago to Barksdale on an administration hop, might have escaped tragedy had it been flying 75 feet higher. Wreckage of the two-engine bomber was scattered over a 75-square yard area." "Havana, Ark., Nov. 19 (UP) – Six army airmen killed when their B-25 bomber crashed into nearby Mt. Magazine Monday night were identified today by Army authorities. They were Capt. William F. Wilson, 29, Strong City, Kansas; Lt. Albert G. Frese Jr., 27, Brunswick, Georgia; 1st Lt. Robert H. Pabst, 24, Milwaukee, Wisconsin; 2nd Lt. Ed D. Ward, 27, Chicago; Pfc. James H. Miersma, 20, Grand Rapids, Michigan, and Pfc. William E. Wesley, 21, Muskegon, Mich. The plane was en route from Chicago to its base at Barksdale Field when it rammed into the mountain in a heavy fog." This crash was initially reported as involving a B-29 Superfortress. "SHREVEPORT, La., Nov. 21. (AP) - A strong east wind which blew the plane off its course was blamed today by an army investigating board for the crash of an army B-25 bomber which crashed into Mount Magazine, Ark., Monday killing six crewmen. The board, in a report to Col. A. C. Strickland, base commander at Barksdale field, said the plane was 70 miles off its course at the time of the crash. The board's report indicated the crash was not caused by failure of the plane's engines or any other equipment. It said a heavy overcast, which obscured the moon, probably prevented the pilot from seeing the mountain."

19 November
In the Martin XB-48 test programme's only accident, pilot E. R. "Dutch" Gelvin tried to abort takeoff in first prototype 45-59585 from NAS Patuxent River in Maryland when the fire warning light came on as the engines reached full power. Gelvin retarded the throttle and applied the brakes, but the bomber did not slow. Running out of runway, he turned off, tried to retract the undercarriage and ran across a ditch, a road, and another ditch. The left outrigger gear collapsed and the jet slid to a stop, leaning to port, 50 feet from a Navy doctor's home. Damage was minimal: gear doors, outrigger, and flaps. The cause was the emergency fuel system, designed to maintain engine power at 94 percent regardless of throttle position. This was eliminated in the second prototype.

21 November
"Williams Field, Ariz., Nov. 21. (AP) - Two Williams Field officers escaped death today when their planes collided 7000 feet above the ground about four miles northwest of the field. First Lt. Thomas P. Demos, 30, of Forest Park, Ill., bailed out of his AT-6 but was injured. He was taken to the field hospital for observation. First Lt. Jack C. Langston, 26, of Medford, Ore., flew his crippled P-51 Mustang back to the field and landed unhurt. Escape from a collision of this type is rare."

"SAN DIEGO, Calif., Nov. 21 (AP) - A navy Martin Mariner patrol bomber is overdue on a flight from Alameda, Calif. naval air station to San Diego, the 11th naval district reported today. The plane, due here at 2:45 p. m., was last heard from at 1:45 p. m. when it radioed the naval air station here and gave its position as 20 miles west of Bakersfield, Calif., the navy said. The number aboard the plane was not known. San Diego police, at the request of the navy, broadcast bulletin advising the state division of forestry border patrol and other police agencies to be on the lookout for the plane."

"SAN DIEGO, Calif., Nov. 22 (AP) - Identity of nine navy officers and enlisted men lost at sea yesterday (21 November) when their Lockheed Neptune patrol bomber crashed 100 miles west of San Diego during maneuvers with the first task fleet was announced today at 11th naval district headquarters. Named with next of kin. the victims included: Seaman 1-C James H. Urry, mother Mabel Urry, Boise, Idaho." Also lost was Lt. Cmdr. Kenneth Dalquist of San Diego. Dalquist was a 1937 graduate of Lewis and Clark High School, and interrupted his Gonzaga University studies to serve with the Navy in the Pacific during World War II. He completed his undergraduate degree there in 1946.

28 November
French General Philippe Leclerc de Hauteclocque, inspector of land forces in North Africa, was killed in the 12:15 crash of his North American B-25J-25/27-NC Mitchell 41-30330 (c/n 87-8495) of GLAM (Groupe de Liaisons Aériennes Ministérielles), named Tailly 2, at Colomb-Béchar, French Algeria. Departing Oran at 10:15, the plane flew into a sandstorm. LeClerc's body was returned to France, where it was taken to Paris along the route that 2e DB had followed in August 1944. A funeral service was held at Notre Dame de Paris, and he was interred in a crypt at Les Invalides.

USAF Douglas C-47B-6-DK 43-48736 (c/n 14552/25997) of the 15th Troop Carrier Squadron, 61st Troop Carrier Group, piloted by Wesley B. Fleming en route from Pisa to Frankfurt-Rhein-Main AFB and thirty miles off course, crashed in the Italian Alps near Trappa, Italy. All five crew and 15 passengers were killed. A search involving hundreds of aircraft from several countries was abandoned on 11 December; The wreckage was discovered eight months later.

30 November
"Tokyo, Dec. 1 (AP) - The wreckage of a plane believed to be an air transport command C-47 missing with two aboard since Sunday morning has been located 5000 feet up the snowclad slopes of Mount Fuji, the First cavalry division said today. The missing plane, carrying only a pilot and copilot, left Haneda airfield near Tokyo on a flight to Itami airbase near Osaka. The United States Far East air force said no radio contact was established with the plane after its takeoff."

9/10 December
"WESTOVER FIELD, Mass., Dec. 11. (AP) - Six American soldiers were found still alive today beside the wreckage of a big transport plane which carried 23 others to death in a midnight crash Tuesday in the sub-Arctic wastelands of Labrador. Rescuers - moved overland by dogsleds and through the air by helicopter - reached the survivors, trapped in icy wilderness eight miles north of the R. C. A. F. airfield at Goose Bay. Air transport command headquarters here said meager reports from the scene gave no indication as to the condition of the survivors. Three doctors were flown in to the scene through a snow and sleet storm to give emergency treatment before the men are evacuated by helicopter to Goose Bay. The rough, rocky terrain made it impossible to bring the six survivors by land and preparations were being made to fly them out to a hospital in Goose Bay. One helicopter - sent to Labrador when the crash was first reported - has been making relay hops during the day. A B-17 dropped medical supplies and food. Visibility was only fair and fears were expressed that bad weather, preventing further flights, might close in before the men could be evacuated. A space has been cleared within a half-mile of the scattered, charred wreckage to allow a helicopter to land and a second helicopter is being sent to Westover field to assist in the rescue. The hilly, forested countryside - although within a few flight minutes of the Green Bay airfield - makes it impossible to use a larger plane." Douglas C-54D-5-DC Skymaster 42-72572, c/n 10677, was destroyed.

11 December
USAF Douglas C-47B-28-DK Skytrain 44-76366 (c/n 32698/15950) of the 608th Base Unit, Aberdeen Army Air Base in Maryland, en route from Biggs Air Force Base, Texas, crashed five miles from Memphis Municipal Airport in Memphis, Tennessee. Four crew and 16 passengers were killed. The plane came down three miles south of the Memphis radio range. "The Atlanta CAA reported there was a ceiling of 1700 feet at 7:30 p. m. shortly after the crash." The plane was returning to Aberdeen Proving Ground. The pilot was H. J. Schofield.

16 December
"Norfolk, Va., Dec. 16 (AP) - Seven naval airmen were killed today when a Corsair fighter plane and a patrol bomber carrying a crew of seven collided in the air and crashed at the Norfolk naval air station. Naval spokesmen said the Corasair, [sic] attached to the carrier Coral Sea, collided at a 100 foot altitude with the right wing of the bomber, attached to amphibious group 3. The Corasair [sic] caught fire and its pilot burned to death. Sole survivor was a crewman aboard the bomber who was thrown from a gun blister when the plane crashed in swampy ground 300 yards from the Corsair. He escaped with cuts and bruises. Six bodies were recovered from the bombing plane."

23 December
A Boeing B-29 Superfortress on a long-range-navigation training flight over northern Alaska with eight on board failed to return to Ladd Air Force Base in Fairbanks at the expected time of 22:00. Search planes were launched on 24 December, but were hampered by poor weather and little daylight. Hopes dimmed for the missing crew as search planes had no success in locating the downed bomber north of the Arctic Circle on the second day of the attempt.

24 December
Boeing B-17G-95-DL Flying Fortress 44-83790 of the 1385th Base Unit, Bluie West One, Greenland, delivering presents and mail to isolated outposts on Baffin Bay, ran out of fuel on Christmas Eve; pilot Chester M. Karney made a forced landing on snow-covered, frozen Dyke Lake in Labrador. None of the nine aboard were injured, and they were picked up on 26 December by a ski- and JATO-equipped Douglas C-47. Officers at Atlantic Division headquarters of Air Transport Command, Westover Air Force Base in Massachusetts said that a snowstorm earlier in the day delayed a flight by the C-47 to fetch the seven crew and two passengers from the ice, and they had prepared to spend a third night in sub-zero temperatures. A successful rescue was achieved, however, and the marooned were flown 275 miles to Goose Bay. The Fortress was abandoned, and sank to the bottom of the lake. Located in July 1998, it was recovered from the lake on 9 September 2004 and is being restored to fly in Douglas, Georgia.

29 December
"NAPLES, Italy, Dec. 29. (AP) - Three United States navy men were killed when a helicopter from the aircraft carrier Midway lost its rotor and fell into a scrap iron pile in the port of Naples today. Two were listed as Naval Officers Lamm and Jack Peter. Their addresses and the name of the third victim were not available. Witnesses said the helicopter took off from the carrier, anchored in Naples harbor, a few minutes before the crash. The accident occurred a few hundred yards from the Friendship Train food ship Exiria." USS Midway operated Sikorsky HO3S helicopters in 1947.

== January–March 1948 ==
2 January
North American P-51D-25-NT Mustang 45-11535 crashed 40 miles north of Roswell, New Mexico shortly after noon, killing the pilot. Maj. Charles Beck, public information officer at Roswell Army Airfield, said that the plane's home base had not been determined.

6 January
Boeing B-29-95-BW Superfortress 45-21829 of the 328th Bomb Squadron, 93d Bomb Group, crashed and burned at Castle Air Force Base in California, but the eight crew and two civilian passengers escaped the bomber without serious injuries.

7 January
"LOUISVILLE, Ky., Jan.8 (AP) - The Kentucky national guard headquarters revealed here today that Capt. Thomas F. Mantell Jr., 25, was killed in a plane explosion near Franklin, Ky., yesterday while chasing what was believed to be a 'flying saucer.' Mantell was one of three Kentucky national guard officers sent to investigate a reported 'flying saucer' in the air near Fort Knox. The object was also reported visible at Hopkinsville, Ky., Nashville, Tenn., and other points in the two states. Mantell was flying a P-51 national guard plane, which witnesses said apparently exploded in the air and crashed near Franklin." Mantell was flying P-51D-20-NA Mustang 44-63869

10 January
The troubled twin-engine French Arsenal VB 10 program stumbled when the second prototype, VB 10-02, caught fire over southern Paris. An uncommanded propeller pitch change over-revved the rear engine, destroying it and starting the fire. The pilot, Pierre Decroo, bailed out and survived with burns.

27 January
USAF Douglas C-47B-25-DK Skytrain 44-76443 (c/n 32775/16027), carrying wives and children of American servicemen to Italy to join them, became lost in a snowstorm after departing Istres Air Base in southern France for Trieste. The pilot attempted to return to the airport, but winds carried it off course. The plane a mountain, killing all twelve aboard.

30 January
A Boeing B-17 Flying Fortress, searching for the Douglas C-47 which disappeared on 27 January in France, spotted the downed transport on the mountainside before it too crashed and burned. Only one member of the ten crew survived: Sgt. Angelo LaSalle of Des Moines, Iowa. He was aided by former Luftwaffe pilot Horst Kupski, a prisoner-of-war working for a French farmer, who loaned him clothing and helped him down the mountain.

31 January
Royal Air Force Avro Lancaster BI TW902 of 115 Squadron, on a training flight from the Middle East, crashed just outside Istres Air Base in southern France. The Air Ministry announced that six of the 14 aboard were killed.

7 February
"SAN DIEGO, Feb. 7 (AP) - Two Navy fliers were killed today when their torpedo bomber crashed and burned during amphibious maneuvers at San Clemente island, 55 miles west of here. The Navy identified the dead as Lt. Comdr. James A. Huser of Lemon Grove, California, the pilot, and Norman C. Benson, aviation radioman 1/c of Leavenworth, Kan. The plane, carrying live ammunition, was nearing the end of a bombing run on the island when it burst into flames and began to disintegrate."

Four soldiers were killed and six injured when an Air Force Douglas C-47 Skytrain crashed into fog-shrouded Mount Page, two miles from Saluda, North Carolina.

"HARRISON, Ark., Feb. 7 (UP) - Five men were given up for dead today as authorities located the wreckage of a B-25 Army bomber on a mountain near Jasper, Ark. Four of the victims were identified by Wright field, Ohio, officials and the fifth was said to be an enlisted Navy man who hitch-hiked a ride."

Lockheed F-80A-1-LO Shooting Star 44-85021 from Chanute Field in Illinois crashed in a cornfield near Champaign, Illinois, killing the pilot.

9 February
"BIG DELTA, Alaska, Feb, 9 (UP) - Twelve passengers and crewmen, including high-ranking Army officers, escaped injury today when the engine of a giant Air Force C-87 exploded and the craft made a forced landing at the Fort Nelson, B. C. airport 700 miles south of here."

10 February
"JACKSONVILLE, Fla., Feb. 10 (AP) - The Navy said tonight a PBM Martin Mariner with 11 men aboard crashed near Jacksonville as it was about to begin a ground controlled approach landing. The two-motored craft had made an over-water training flight to San Juan, Puerto Rico, and had returned here for a landing."

26 February
"MERIDIAN, Texas, Feb. 26 (AP) - The crash of a B-29 near here brought fiery death to four members of the crew but did not prevent 19 other bombers in the flight continuing a routine mission today to the west coast and back. Eight members of the 12-man crew, including Col. Alan D. Clark, Seventh Bombardment wing commander, who commanded the flight, bailed out of the plane. None of the survivors were hurt seriously. The dead were: Capt. Alfred H. Knippa, Knippa, Texas; Sgt. Leonard G. Taylor, Sacramento, California; Sgt. Donald D. Merrick, Louisville, Ky.; Cpl. Joe F. Taylor, Brownwood, Texas."

28 February
Two Army Air Force crew were killed in the crash of North American T-6C-NT Texan 41-32589 near Cowan, Tennessee in mountainous terrain while flying from Hot Springs, Arkansas, to Murphy, North Carolina. A search was begun when they were reported overdue on Sunday, 29 February. Rescuers labored for several hours to reach the wreckage, which had been spotted by a search plane. Capt. R. M. Howard of the Air Forces rescue service identified the victims as Frank Dreher of West Columbia, South Carolina (a February 1948 pre-med graduate of Clemson College), and Hubert Wells of Murphy, North Carolina.

7 March
A U.S. Navy Beechcraft SNB trainer crashed and burned on takeoff from NAS Olathe in Kansas, killing five crewmen and critically injuring a sixth. Identification of the dead and injured was withheld. Executive officer James Peterson said that the six men had flown to Olathe from Omaha for routine weekly drills, and were reserve officers or enlisted men in the reserve.

10 March
"TUCSON, Ariz., March 10. (AP) - An Army Air force A-26 light bomber was reported to have crashed at the Nogales, Ariz. airport this afternoon. Apparently no deaths or serious injuries resulted. The plane was from March Field, California, the report said and was piloted by Lt. Frederick H. Rohde."

17 March
Two Grumman F8F Bearcats assigned to the USS Boxer with VF-19A, left Naval Air Station El Centro for Naval Air Station Alameda in California and collided shortly after takeoff. The Eleventh Naval District said that both pilots were killed.

18 March
A Boeing B-29 Superfortress from Spokane Air Depot in Washington, crashed while attempting a landing on a fog-shrouded runway at MacDill Field (near Tampa), Florida. Ten crew were killed and four injured.

20, 25 March

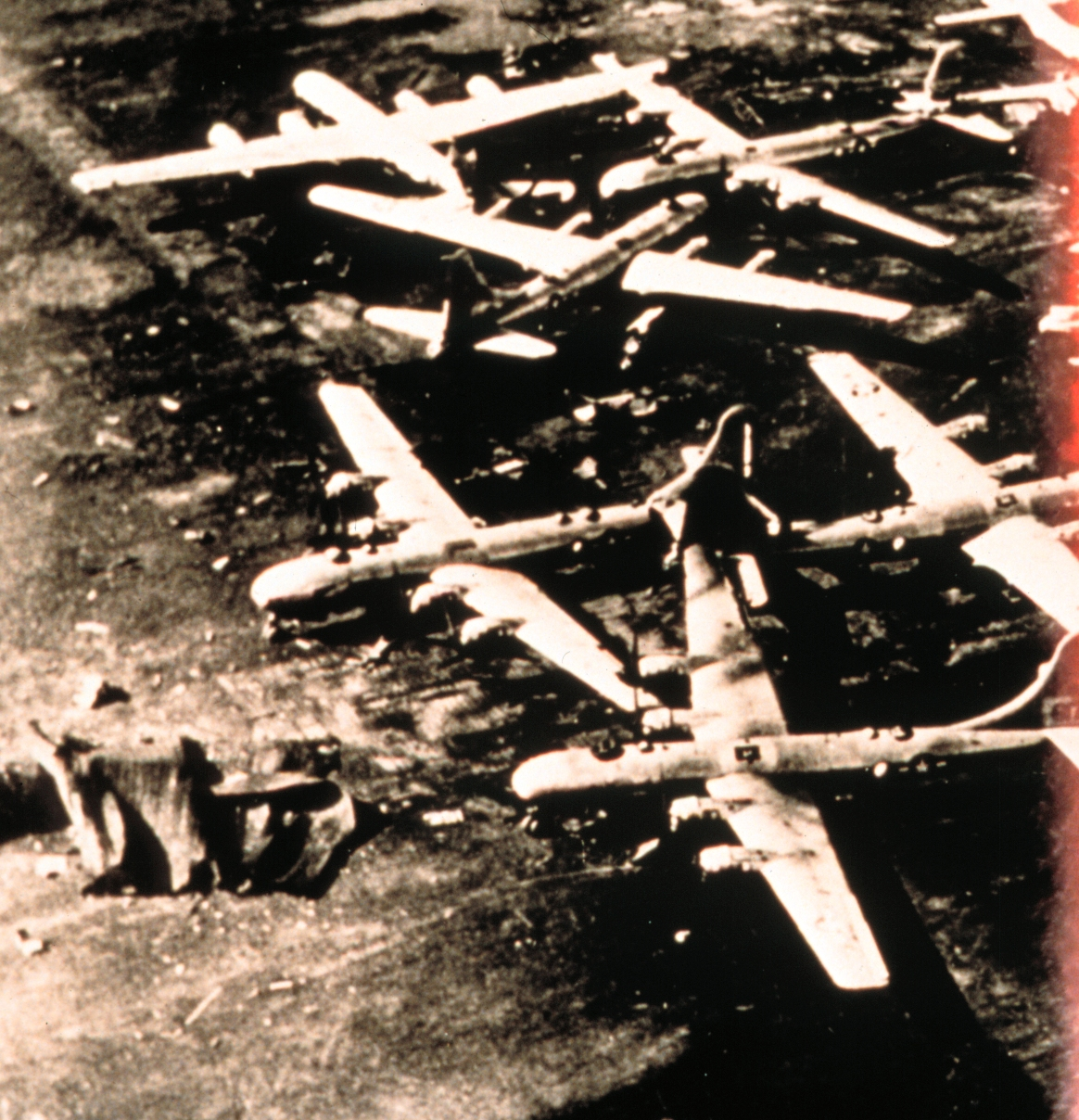
Superfortresses tossed about by the 20 March Tinker Air Force Base tornado

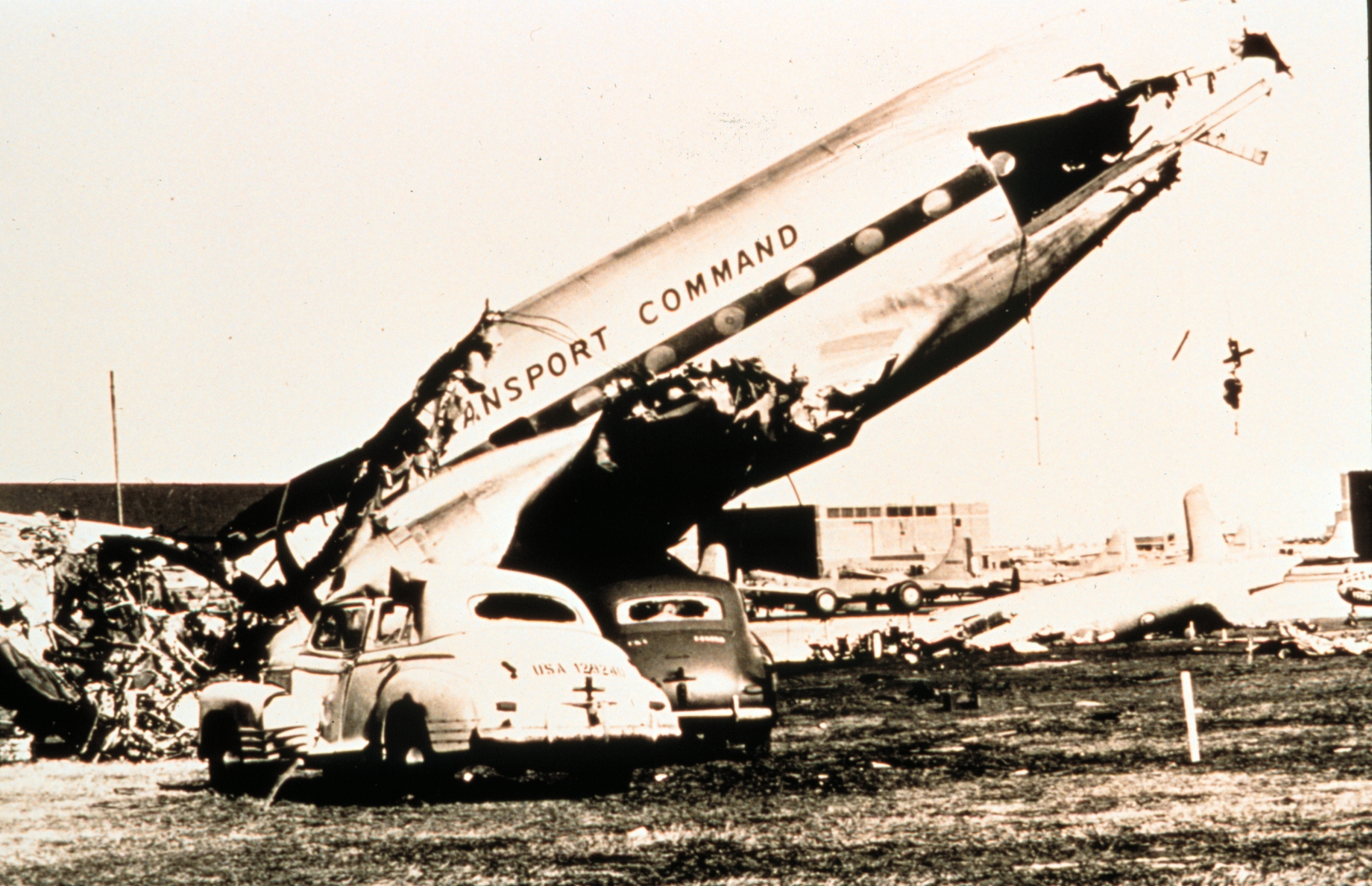
Damage to airplane and cars from the second tornado, five days later

Two large tornadoes struck Tinker Air Force Base in Oklahoma City, damaging or destroying a large number of aircraft (including at least two Douglas C-54 Skymasters, a Douglas C-47 Skytrain, and many stored Boeing B-29 Superfortresses from World War II). In the first storm, "54 aircraft were destroyed, including 17 C-54 transports valued at $500,000 apiece. Also destroyed were 15 P-47 fighters and two B-29 bombers. About 50 other planes were damaged and about 100 vehicles were damaged or destroyed." In the second tornado, "84 planes were hit, 35 of which were destroyed. These included 18 B-29s, 8 P-47s, 20 B-17s, and 3 C-47s. Hangars and other buildings were destroyed." Other planes destroyed included Beechcraft AT-11s, Fairchild PT-19s and PT-26 Cornells. Damage from the second tornado was estimated at $6.1 million, and the total damage from both storms was estimated at $16.35 million.

21 March
"McCHORD FIELD, Wash., March 21 (AP) - An air force C-47 with eight men aboard vanished over southwestern Washington during a severe storm this afternoon as it was making an instrument approach to the Portland, Ore., air base. Fears that it had crashed were heightened when no trace of the twin-engined transport was found by the time its fuel was exhausted at 5:07 p.m. Fairfield-Suisun air base announced the names of five of the men aboard. They were: Maj. John B. Harding, the pilot, Fairfield-Suisun base. Capt. William H. Tillery, Fairfield, Calif. Capt. Wiley A. Garber, Oakland, Calif. Capt. Frederick J. Ziegler, Sacramento, Calif. Sgt. Stephen J. Pressey, Oakland, Calif. Last radio contact with the plane was at 1:07 p.m. At that time the pilot messaged he was 25 [miles] north of Portland making a procedure turn at 4000 feet for an instrument letdown. The missing craft was on a routine training flight from its home field at Fairfield-Suisun, (Calif.) to Portland. An intensive ground search of the area was launched by Washington and Oregon state police. Low clouds, heavy rains and limited visibility prevented rescue planes from taking off here or at Portland."

31 March
One of two Curtiss SB2C-5 Helldivers (BuNo 83414), en route from Naval Air Station Tillamook in Oregon, to San Diego, California, crashed in the woods near Rockaway Beach, Oregon, killing pilot Robert W. Smedley. Loggers who witnessed the troubled flight and the crash penetrated the rugged forest area on a ridge of the Pacific coast mountains. K. B. Hamilton reported that the pilot had apparently tried to parachute, since the shroud was tangled in the wreckage. The engine was buried. The logger said that the plane must have come down in a dive, since the treetops were not sheared off. The wreckage was rediscovered by loggers on 10 March 2010.

"HEMPSTEAD, N. Y., March 31 (AP) - Two air force fliers were killed today when a fighter plane from Mitchel field crashed and burned in a wooded area near the field. First Lt. Alan Belmarsh, 26, of Brockton, Mass., was killed instantly. First Lt. Ray E. Fritsche, 25, of route 4, San Augustine, Texas, died at the Mitchel field base hospital."

== April–June 1948 ==
2 April
A USAF Reserve Beechcraft AT-11 with three men aboard disappeared during a 35-mile flight from McChord Air Force Base to Naval Air Station Sand Point, near Seattle. Wreckage was sighted on 4 April near the summit of 5,344-foot Mount Pilchuck in the Mount Baker National Forest, about 18 miles northeast of Everett, Washington. Col. John B. Randolph, air reserve commander at McChord, reported from a search plane that its identity was confirmed by the tail number of the downed craft. McChord authorities identified the victims as pilot Capt. James E. McLaughlin of Tacoma, Washington, on active army duty as commanding officer of the Seattle air reserve; copilot 2d Lt. Francis A. Geyer of Aberdeen, Washington, and T/Sgt. Carl T. Fields of Puyallup, Washington. Two Air Force ground parties were en route to the crash site. The crash site was finally reached on 7 April.

3 April
"LOS ANGELES, April 3 (AP) - Ten persons escaped unhurt today when an Air Force B-25, arriving from Phoenix, struck a ditch at the end of a Municipal airport runway and nosed over."

5 April

A Soviet Yakovlev Yak-3 fighter buzzed British European Airways Vickers VC.1B Viking G-AIVP (c/n 229) on a scheduled flight to Berlin and collided with the wing of the airliner, killing the pilots of both aircraft and ten passengers on the Viking. There were 15 total fatalities.

A March Air Force Base Lockheed P-80 Shooting Star crashed in a field three miles east of Chino, California, with pilot 1st Lt. James A. Reints of the 27th Fighter Squadron suffering only a sprained ankle and a head bruise in the bailout. Reints narrowly missed a house as he landed at Ely Street and Archibald Avenue; the jet crashed on Grove Avenue, near Edison Avenue.

Two U.S. Marine planes and four Marine fliers were missing during night aerial manoeuvers off Barber's Point in Oahu, Hawaii, and it was assumed that they collided. The Navy suspended its search for the missing aircrew on 7 April, but 20 Marine planes continued to scan for survivors, No wreckage was found.

9 April
A six-month fatality-free period at Eglin AFB, Florida, (the longest since the base opened) ended when Capt. William Robbins, 26, was killed in the crash of North American P-51D-30-NA Mustang 44-74913 in a wooded area north of Crestview, Florida.

10 April
Eglin AFB experienced its second accident in two days when a Douglas A-26 Invader from Biggs AFB in El Paso, Texas, crashed in the Gulf of Mexico south of Destin, Florida. Two of the three crew survive by parachuting from stricken bomber, on temporary duty assignment for firing exercises over the Gulf. First Lieutenant John Kubo and T/Sgt. Joseph A. Riley were rescued by Eglin crash boats. T/Sgt. John E. Brizendine was listed as missing.

"North Little Rock, Ark., April 11 (AP) - Two men were killed when an army AT-6 crashed here last night after radioing that the plane was running low on fuel. The dead were identified as Sgt. John N. Morris, 27, of Indianapolis and Capt. John H. Barber Jr., 29, of Texarkana, Tex."

13 April
"SANTA MONICA, April 13 (AP) - A Navy carrier-type plane crashed into a house today and seriously injured Jackson G. Armstrong, 28, test pilot for Douglas Aircraft, which built the restricted craft. Armstrong, former Army Air Force pilot, experienced engine trouble at 5,000 feet and headed for an emergency landing at Clover field. His plane shot uncontrolled down the runway and off a 60-foot embankment at the end. Its speed was such that the plane, with power shut off, carried 300 feet further through the air, struck telephone lines and plowed into a house, caromed off and lodged 15 feet above the ground in a tree."

20 April
"TOKYO, April 23 (UP) - Far East Air Force headquarters announced today that it has virtually given up for lost 10 American fliers missing near Guam since Tuesday. The men left Guam aboard a B-29 to practice bombing and aerial photography on a small island 350 miles to the north."

23 April
"CANFIELD, Ark., April 23 (UP) - Four servicemen were killed instantly when a plane, believed to be an Air Force B-25 bomber, crashed today in a wooded area four miles northeast of Canfield. Barksdale field officers from Shreveport, La. withheld names of the victims pending notification of the next of kin."

25 April
As Royal Canadian Air Force No. 400 Squadron (based in Toronto) transitioned from North American Harvards to de Havilland Vampires, Flight Lieutenant Duncan Bell-Irving, a regular-force officer attached to the squadron, force- landed on the airfield after his engine failed at 1,000 feet just after takeoff.

28 April
"SAN DIEGO, April 28 (AP) - One torpedo plane crashed as Navy bombers engaged submarines in maneuvers off here today. There was no sign of its crew of three in the recovered wreckage. The 11th naval district received word from the first task fleet that radio contact was lost with plane about 4 a.m. Wreckage was recovered 45 miles off the coast sometime later by search craft. Bombers were sent out in an attempt to destroy screening submarines of an 'enemy' naval force off the coast. The main enemy force was sighted but weather prevented the scheduled mass air attack. This is expected tomorrow - the fourth of six days of exercises."

29 April
Pilot Lt. Ralph Van Kerhove of Chicago crash-landed his North American P-51 Mustang of the 66th Fighter Squadron, Elmendorf AFB, on mud flats 20 miles west of Anchorage, Alaska. Kerhove scrambled free, despite injuries, before the fighter exploded and burned. A helicopter crew monitoring his distress call went to the scene and braved exploding .50 caliber ammunition in the burning Mustang to pick up the pilot, who was lying on the ground with shock and superficial cuts 300 feet from the plane. "Kerhove was in the 183rd hospital at Fort Richardson here in less than 30 minutes."

3 May
The second Douglas D-558-1 Skystreak (BuNo 37971, NACA 141) crashed on takeoff on its 20th flight for NACA (its 46th total takeoff) at Edwards AFB in California due to compressor disintegration which cut control runs in the fuselage, killing NACA pilot Howard C. Lilly. Lilly, the first NACA pilot to die on duty, was the first pilot who had flown at supersonic speed to be killed. His parents lived in Beckley, West Virginia.

A Boeing B-29 Superfortress of the 301st Bombardment Group crashed shortly after takeoff at night from Fürstenfeldbruck Air Base. One crewman was burned to death, and two were seriously injured.

4 May
A U.S. Navy aviator was killed when his target-towing Grumman F6F Hellcat crashed offshore at Oahu, Hawaii, during gunnery practice. The pilot's name was withheld, pending notification of his family.

6 May
Two US Air Force North American P-51 Mustangs disappeared and were found on 8 May 90 miles north of Fairbanks, where they had crash-landed. Lts. Grady Morris of Jacksonville, Florida and Garnett D. Page of Decatur, Alabama were uninjured.

The U.S. Navy completed the first carrier qualifications of a jet-equipped squadron when VF-17A flew aboard and launched McDonnell FH-1 Phantoms from the USS Saipan, operating off Block Island, Rhode Island. VF-17A squadron commander Ralph A. Fuoss of Altoona, Pennsylvania, plunged into the water 2,000 feet short of the runway at Naval Air Station Quonset Point as he led his flight in for a routine landing. Fuoss' body and the wreckage of his plane were recovered on 9 May. An investigation began to determine whether the crash was the result of mechanical failure or a mid-air collision. "His wing man, Lt. John Sullivan of Dorchester, Mass., reported after landing safely that part of the tail surface of Fuoss' plane had struck his wing."

9 May
Routine radio traffic from a U.S. Navy amphibious patrol bomber between Puerto Rico and Florida was last heard at 03:00, with no mention of trouble. The Navy announced on 10 May that a search for the flight and the twelve aboard was underway by the Navy and Air Force.

11 May
Maj. Simon H. Johnson, deputy commanding officer of Eglin AFB's fighter section, was killed when his Republic F-84 Thunderjet broke up during an air demonstration at the base before about 600 spectators. Eglin's public information officer said that the pilot was "engaged in operational tests on the plane" when the accident occurred. Johnson, a resident of Shalimar, Florida, was originally from Houston, Texas. He had served a year in Italy, flying 50 missions in North American P-51 Mustangs with the 31st Fighter Group and earning the Distinguished Flying Cross and the air medal with five clusters. He had attended the University of Texas, and graduated from the U.S. Army flying school in 1940.

13 May
"LOCARNO, Switzerland, May 13.(AP) - Maj. Pisle Hitz, who helped rescue 12 Americans from Agull glacier [sic] in 1946, died in a plane crash today. Hitz, 30, and Cpl. Willy Kiene were killed when their army plane crashed while practicing emergency landings. Hitz and another Swiss army pilot landed on the glacier, 9000 feet above sea level, and flew the Americans out. They had been stranded five days after a United States army transport landed on the ice." Other sources list the pilot's name as Pista Hitz.

Two North American P-51 Mustangs engaged in training combat manoeuvers at high altitude over Anchorage, Alaska, collided, exploded, and crashed into the Knik Arm of Cook Inlet before hundreds of onlookers. Both pilots were killed. One body was found floating in an oil slick on the water, but the other body was not immediately recovered.

A USAF Douglas C-54 Skymaster, making an instrument approach in a driving rainstorm to Northampton, Massachusetts, crashed on soggy ground (making an eight-foot crater), exploded and burned, spreading wreckage over a five-acre area. All three crew were killed. Air Transport Command identified the victims as Capt. Paul Longuich, 40, of Yonkers, New York; 1st Lt. Wilfred W. Lavinder, 23, of Portsmouth, Ohio, and Staff Sgt. Jack Zaresky, 26, of Jackson Heights, New York.

14 May
"FRANKFURT, Germany, May 14 (Friday) (AP) - The United States Air Force announced today that a B-29 Superfortress crashed 120 miles northwest of Dhahran, Saudi Arabia, with a possible loss of 13 lives."

17 May
"NEWARK, Cal., May 17 (UP) - Test Pilot R. S. Carter of San Jose, was killed today when his surplus P-51 fighter plane exploded in flight."

18 May
Lockheed P-80B-1-LO Shooting Star (45-8497), one of several taking part in manoeuvers testing northwest air defenses, crashed three miles east of Sprague, Washington. Officials at Spokane Air Force Base said on 20 May that pilot Capt. Franklin T. Johnson of Lake Elsinore, California was killed.

23 May
In the early evening, ex-RAF Handley Page Halifax C.MK 8 (registered G-AIZO, ex-PP293 and operated by Bond Air Services), carrying a cargo of apricots from Valencia, Spain, crashed in Studham, Bedfordshire on a Standard Beam Approach (SBA) to RAF Bovingdon in bad weather. After a steep turn to port and losing height rapidly, the Halifax side-slipped towards the ground until, seeming to recover and flying straight and level with engines at full power, the aircraft struck the ground flat and broke into its component sections. The crew escaped alive. After initial suspicions that the cargo may have shifted in flight, an AAIB report blamed loss of control by the pilot while the aircraft was too close to the ground for recovery.

27 May
A Douglas C-47 Skytrain en route from New Orleans to its home base at Roswell, New Mexico crashed in an electrical storm in a cornfield 20 miles southwest of Baton Rouge, Louisiana, killing all seven on board. The wreckage was scattered over at least an acre. The National Guard identified the pilot as 1st Lt. Philip R. Vaughn, and the co-pilot as 2d Lt. K. R. Bailey. Some of those aboard were servicemen hitching rides to the West Coast.

June
The second Supermarine E.10/44, TS413, was lost while undergoing trials with a 270-gallon ventral fuel tank. A&AEE pilot Lt. T. J. A. Joyce-King, Royal Navy, was killed. The loss was thought to be probably caused by rudder lock-over (sometimes experienced in a side-slip while carrying a large, ventral tank), and was cured by adding a long dorsal fin to all production Attackers.

4 June
"Tokyo, June 12 (AP) - Three American airmen were killed in the crash of a P-61 on the southern Japanese island of Kyushu, Far East air force headquarters announced. The victims were identified as First Lts. Joseph R. Johnson of Bellefonte, Pa., pilot, Clarence T. Konecn, Bryan, Texas, radar observer; and Sgt. Joseph R. Beeles, Fulton, N. Y."

berney

5 June
Northrop YB-49-NO 42-102368 (c/n 1488) crashed in the desert near Muroc Air Force Base in California after both outer wings become detached from the center section during spin recovery, killing pilot Maj. Daniel Forbes of Topeka, Kansas; co-pilot Capt. Glen W. Edwards of Lincoln, California; Lt. Edward Swindell of Virginia Beach, Virginia, and two civilians: C. C. Leser of Joliet, Illinois and C. H. Lafountain of Hudson Falls, New York. All were attached to the flight-test division of Air Materiel Command at Wright Field, Ohio. Forbes Air Force Base in Kansas was named for the pilot, and Muroc was renamed Edwards Air Force Base for the co-pilot on 5 December 1949. The flying-wing bomber design was revived in the 1980s as the B-2 Spirit.

12 June
Pilot Capt. Bill E. Myers failed to lift off from Godman Field in Fort Knox, Kentucky, on takeoff in Lockheed F-80A-1-LO Shooting Star 44-85116, crashed through a fence and plowed into a passing car. All four in the automobile died, but the pilot was uninjured. The Godman Field public information office said that the P-80 was bound for Eglin AFB in Florida after a stopover at Godman. The victims, all from nearby Elizabethtown, Kentucky, were Vernon C. Ferren, 63; his wife, Annie C. Ferren, 50; Lela Ferren, 61, Vernon's sister; and Spencer Blackburn, 43. The airframe had been tested with wingtip rocket racks.

19 June
A Douglas C-54 Skymaster departed Lawson Air Force Base at Fort Benning in Georgia with 45 on board, including 39 West Point cadets, for a flight to Louisville, Kentucky. Shortly after takeoff, a fuel line broke and sparks from engine exhaust set it alight. "The flames spread over one of the wings but crew members prevented the fire from reaching the fuel tanks." Maj. W. B. Curran of Santa Ana, California safely returned the burning transport to Lawson, where crash apparatus was standing by. There were no injuries.

20 June
Second Lt. Richard Ambrose, 23, a student at Gonzaga University in Spokane, was killed in the 14:50 crash and burning of North American P-51D-20-NA Mustang 44-63700 c/n 122-31426, of the 116th Fighter Squadron, Felts Field, Washington Air National Guard at Gray Field, Fort Lewis, Washington. On 1 July 1948, the 116th moved to larger Geiger Field. Gonzaga records indicated that Ambrose was a sophomore in electrical engineering and lived in Spokane. The son of M. J. Ambrose of Bernardsville, New Jersey, he attended Villanova University before transferring to Gonzaga. The P-51 crashed while landing at Gray Field just after a formation flight over Gov. Mon C. Wallgren's reviewing stand during a Governor's Day review. The field is two miles from the north Fort Lewis parade grounds, where the reviewing stands were located.

23 June
"Two Navy planes, flying in a seven-ship formation, crashed and burned today after colliding over the heavily-populated east side area of Detroit. The flaming wreckage set fire to four houses and a tool shop as scores of residents fled to safety. The two pilots of the single-seater planes died in the crash, and one tool shop employe [sic] was slightly injured when struck by flaming debris. First reports of the accident said three planes were involved, but public relations officers at the Grosse Ile naval air station said only two craft figured in the crash. Lieutenant Commander David A. Black, public relations officer, said that when the two planes collided, the others scattered hurriedly. This led some ground spectators to believe three planes had crashed, he said." Falling wreckage set a fire in a one-block area, but rescue personnel said that they thought all occupants had escaped. They were part of a cross-country formation by VA-89A to Traverse City, and the collision occurred during a right turn over Detroit. The prop of F4U-4 Corsair BuNo 96790, flown by Ens. Roy K. Schultheiss, 24, of Port Huron, Michigan, cut the tail off the F6F-5 Hellcat BuNo 79445 piloted by Ens. J. H. Nicholson, 25, Scranton, Iowa. The Hellcat crashed through the roof of the Putnam Tool Company on Charlevoix; sixty people in the machine shop fled to safety. The Corsair crashed and exploded two blocks away on Benson, near McDougall. Observers said that the pilots could have saved themselves by jumping, but stayed with their planes to try to avoid damage to those living below.

27 June
A P-51 Mustang of the California Air National Guard and an A-26 Invader of the 115th Bomb Squadron, California Air National Guard, on a training mission out of Van Nuys Airport, collided over Blythe, California. The craft fell outside town, with burning wreckage spread over a quarter-mile of the Colorado Desert. Three Guardsmen were killed, and two parachuted to safety. "Lt. Raymond L. Mathews of Los Angeles, pilot of the fighter, and Lt. Harold A. Bowen of Pasadena, member of the bomber crew, escaped death by bailing out. Later the National Guard identified two of the men killed as First Lt. William E. Van Delinder of Long Beach and Second Lt. Robert Aiken of Rosemead. Efforts were being made to reach vacationing parents of the third victim, an enlisted man."

== July–December 1948 ==
3 July
"PEARL HARBOR, July 3 (AP) - A Marine fighter pilot who vanished during fleet exercises at 4:30 a.m. was being sought by 57 planes in the area southwest of Pearl Harbor today."

4 July
The 1948 Northwood mid-air collision occurred at 15:03 when Douglas DC-6 SE-BDA (Agnar Viking) of Scandinavian Airlines System (SAS) and Avro York C.1 MW248 of 99 Squadron of the Royal Air Force (RAF) collided over Northwood in London. All thirty-nine people aboard both aircraft were killed. It was SAS's first fatal aviation accident, and was the deadliest civilian aviation accident in the UK at the time; it is still the deadliest mid-air collision in British history.

8 July

USAF Douglas C-47A-30-DK Skytrain 43-48256 crashed near Wiesbaden, Germany, killing three crew. It was the first accident of the Berlin Airlift. First Lt. George B. Smith, First Lt. Leland V. Williams, and Karl v. Hagen of the Department of the Army were killed. (One source incorrectly lists this crash as involving a C-54 Skymaster.)

21 July

United States Air Force Boeing B-29-100-BW Superfortress 45-21847, modified into a Boeing F-13 Superfortress reconnaissance platform, crashed into Lake Mead, Nevada, during a classified cosmic-ray research mission out of Armitage Field, Naval Air Facility, NOTS, Inyokern, California. Five crew escaped unharmed before the bomber sank.

25 July
Douglas C-47B-15-DK Skytrain 43-49534 (c/n 15350/26795), participating in the Berlin Airlift, departed from Wiesbaden Air Base in Germany, struck an apartment building on its approach to Berlin and crashed in the street, killing both crew: 1st Lt. Charles H. King and 1st Lt. Robert W. Stuber.

20 August
Boeing B-29-15-BA Superfortress 42-63442 crashed near Rapid City, South Dakota shortly after takeoff from Rapid City AFB, killing all 17 on board.

23 August
On the first flight test of the McDonnell XF-85 Goblin parasite fighter 45–524, (the second of two prototypes), McDonnell test pilot Edwin F. Schoch successfully detached from the trapeze on Boeing EB-29B Superfortress 44-84111 (named "Monstro"); when he tried to hook up after free flight, the small fighter (buffeted by turbulence from the bomber) swung violently forward and smashed the canopy against the trapeze (knocking the pilot's helmet off). Schoch belly-landed on a dry lake bed at Muroc Air Force Base in California with little damage.

24 August
Two accidents killed 13 U.S. airmen. Nine were killed aboard Army Douglas C-117A-1-DK Skytrain 45-2554 (c/n 18557/34212) near Newton, New Jersey, after a mid-air collision with Army North American B-25J-30-NC Mitchell 44-86870. The bomber had damage to a wingtip, but landed safely. Two C-47 Skytrains involved in the Berlin Airlift collided in mid-air near Ravolzhausen, killing two crew on each plane. Killed in the C-47s were Maj. Edwin C. Diltz, Capt. William R. Howard, Capt. Joel M. DeVolentine, and 1st Lt. William T. Lucas. Capt. Howard was piloting C-47A-80-DL 43-15116, and Capt. DeVolentine was flying C-47A-90-DL 43-16036 (c/n 20502).

3 September
The only Silverplate Boeing B-29 Superfortress to be part of the strike package on both atomic missions over Japan, Boeing B-29-40-MO Superfortress 44-27353 (The Great Artiste) of the 509th Composite Group deployed to Goose Bay Air Base in Labrador for polar-navigation training, aborted a routine training flight due to an engine problem, made a downwind landing, touched down halfway down the runway, overran onto an unfinished extension and ground-looped to avoid a tractor. Structural damage to the wing joint was so severe that the Superfortress never flew again, and the airframe was scrapped at Goose Bay in September 1949.

4 September
A U.S. Navy Vought F4U Corsair fighter from Naval Air Station New York crashed into a four-family home at 39–29 212th Street in Bayside, Queens, killing pilot 1st Lt. Roger Olsen, USMCR of New Rochelle, New York and three civilian women: Helen Raynor, Alice Cressmer, and Louise Paul. The pilot, a 1943 Pensacola graduate, was on the first day of a two-week reserve training course. The plane crashed one block from the Bayside station of the Long Island Rail Road.

15 September
The death knell for the trouble-prone French Arsenal VB 10 program sounded when the third (some say first) production machine crashed after the failure of one of the coupled power plants caused an in-flight fire, killing pilot Henri Koechlin. "Six days later on 21 September 1948, the Arsenal VB 10 contract was cancelled. At the time of cancellation, four production VB 10 aircraft (including the one that crashed) had flown, six additional airframes had been completed, and a number of airframes were under construction. All remaining VB 10s (including the first prototype) were scrapped."

18 September
An RAF de Havilland Mosquito crashed during an air show at RAF Manston, killing both crew and ten spectators.

19 September
An RCAF de Havilland Vampire crashed into a hillside in what is now the Ganaraska Forest near Kendal, Ontario. Flight Lieutenant Leslie Banner was killed while returning to Trenton, Ontario, from Niagara Falls, New York. Missing his turn at Newcastle due to heavy clouds, he went off course and crashed on the side of Lookout Hill.

20 September
First prototype USAF North American XB-45 Tornado 45-59479, in a dive test at Muroc Air Force Base in California, to test design load factor, experienced an engine explosion which tore off cowling panels that sheared several feet from the horizontal stabilizer. The aircraft pitched up, and both wings tore off under a negative g-force. The crew had no ejection seats, and George Krebs and Nick Piccard were killed.

6 October

An engine fire caused the crash in Waycross, Georgia of Boeing B-29-100-BW Superfortress 45-21866 of the 3150th Electronics Squadron, United States Air Force, shortly after takeoff from Robins Air Force Base. Nine of the 13 men aboard were killed, including three RCA engineers; four parachuted to safety.

18 October
USAF Douglas C-54D-10-DC Skymaster 42-72688 (c/n 10793), participating in the Berlin Airlift, crashed near Rhein-Main Air Base in Germany. Three crew were killed: Capt. James A. Vaughn, 1st Lt. Eugene Erickson and Sgt. Richard Winter.

19 October
Royal Navy Grumman Avenger III KE443 (FD 068) of 703 Squadron, shore-based at Ford, Sussex, nosed over on landing aboard HMS Illustrious. The airframe was not repaired and ended up on the fire dump at Gosport, Hampshire, surviving until at least mid-1950.

22 October
On the fifth flight of second prototype McDonnell XF-85 Goblin parasite fighter 45–524, McDonnell test pilot Edwin F. Schoch unhooked from the trapeze on Boeing EB-29B Superfortress 44-84111 (named "Monstro) and retracted the small fighter's nose hook in flight for the first time. When he extended it to reconnect with the mother ship, buffeting over the open nose hook well (previously flown taped closed) made the Goblin too unstable for reconnection. The hook was broken in the attempts, and Schoch belly-landed on the dry lake at Muroc Air Force Base for the second time. This was the last flight of the second prototype.

3 November
Boeing RB-29A Superfortress 44-61999 ("Overexposed") of the 16th Photographic Reconnaissance Squadron, 91st Reconnaissance Group, 311th Air Division, Strategic Air Command, USAF, crashed on Shelf Moor, Bleaklow, between Manchester and Sheffield, while descending through cloud. All 13 crew were killed. It is doubtful that they ever saw the ground, and the crash time was ascertained from a crew member's wristwatch. The plane, piloted by Captain L. P. Tanner, was on a short flight carrying mail and the payroll for American service personnel based at USAF Burtonwood. The flight was from Scampton (near Lincoln) to Burtonwood (near Warrington), less than an hour. Low cloud hung over much of England, which meant the plane had to be flown on instruments. The crew descended after having flown for the time the crew believed it should have taken them to cross the hill. The aircraft had not quite passed the hills, crashed near Higher Shelf Stones, and was destroyed by fire.

4 November
A twin-engine Neptune patrol plane smashed into the snow-covered base of a Vancouver Island mountain. After the discovery of the wreckage in 1961, the US Navy erected a memorial plaque at the site the following year. In 1990, the remains of the nine Navy airmen were recovered and buried in a single grave at Arlington National Cemetery.

5 November
Boeing DB-17G Flying Fortress 44-83678, returning to Eglin Air Force Base in Florida from Fort Wayne, Indiana, crashed in woods southeast of Auxiliary Field 2 of Pierce Field and burned northeast of the runway at Eglin main base. All five on board were killed: Lt. Col. Frederick W. Eley, 43, of Shalimar, Florida, staff judge advocate at Eglin for nearly three years, returning from his grandmother's funeral in Portland, Indiana; Maj. Bydie J. Nettles, 29, of Shalimar, Florida, group adjutant for the 3203rd Maintenance and Supply section; Capt. Robert LeMar, 31, Ben's Lake, Eglin AFB, test pilot with the 3203rd; crew chief M/Sgt. Carl LeMieux, 31, of Milton, Florida; and Sgt. William E. Bazer, 36, assistant engineer, of Destin, Florida. Bazer's wife was the Eglin base librarian.

7 November
Second prototype Republic XR-12 Rainbow 44-91003 crashed at 13:00 while returning to Eglin AFB. The number-two (port inner) engine exploded as the aircraft was returning from a photographic-suitability test flight. The pilot, unable to maintain control due to violent buffeting, ordered the crew to bail out. Five of the seven crew escaped safely, including pilot Lynn Hendrix, and were rescued by Eglin crash boats and helicopters. The airframe crashed two miles south of the base, in Choctawhatchee Bay. Sgt. Vernon B. Palmer, 20, and M/Sgt. Victor C. Riberdy, 30, who lived at Auxiliary Field 5 but was from Hartford, Connecticut, were killed.

8 or 11 December (sources differ)
US Navy Douglas R5D-3 Skymaster BuNo 56502 (c/n 10643), returning from the Berlin Airlift, crashed in the Taunus mountains near Frankfurt-am-Main south of Königstein im Taunus. One crew of the six aboard was killed: AMM3 Harry R. Crites Jr.

13 December
A blade on the starboard rotor of the second prototype Bratukhin B-11 Soviet twin-rotor helicopter failed, and the crash killed the two crew.

28 December
The pilot was killed when his Lockheed F-80A-1-LO Shooting Star 44-85282 crashed in the village of Jeddo, Michigan. Papers on his body identified him as Lt. Joseph R. Thomis of Paducah, Kentucky, assigned to Selfridge Field in Michigan.

Michigan Air National Guard Douglas B-26B-30-DL Invader 41-39350, on "a routine navigational flight from McDill [sic] field, Fla.", crashed three miles east of Willow Run Airport near Ypsilanti, Michigan, killing four crew and (possibly) two civilian passengers picked up at MacDill Field. Col. Donald W. Armstrong, commander of the Michigan air wing, said that he "believed" that passengers were aboard. The names of the victims were not immediately released.

== January–June 1949 ==
4 January
Douglas VC-47D Skytrain 43-48405 (c/n 25666/14221) crashed and burned in a night accident, coming down in mountainous terrain about 8 miles (13 km) northeast of Colfax, California. The Placer County coroner said that there were seven fatalities. The flight was believed to be between Reno and McClellan Air Force Base in California. The crash site is near the American River and highway U.S. 40.

5 January
As five U.S. Navy Grumman F8F Bearcats made firing runs on a gunnery target sleeve towed by another aircraft, two fighters collided at 7,000 feet and plunged into the Pacific Ocean off San Francisco. Both pilots, Ens. Peter J. McHugh of Alameda and Lt. William R. Cecil of Oakland, were feared lost. Later that day, a Douglas AD Skyraider expected to return to NAS Alameda at 11:50 after a routine two-hour flight was declared missing shortly before 14:00 (when its fuel would have been exhausted).

6 January
The pilot of a Grumman F6F Hellcat was feared lost after his fighter went into the sea 20 miles (32 km) west of San Diego. Crewmen of the escort carrier USS Bairoko (CVE-115) reported seeing the Hellcat hit the water.

7 January
USAF Douglas C-54G-5-DO Skymaster 45-0543 (c/n 35996) of the 14th Troop Carrier Squadron, 61st Troop Carrier Group, en route to RAF Burtonwood from Rhein-Main Air Base for a 200-hour inspection, crashed at about 16:45 in bad weather at Stake House Fell, Lancashire, England. All six aboard were killed: pilot 1st Lt. Richard M. Wurgel, co-pilot 1st Lt. Lowell A. Wheaton Jr., engineer Sgt. Bernard J. Watkins, radio operator Cpl. Norbert H. Theis, and passengers Capt. W. A. Rathgeber and Pvt. Ronald E. Stone. An investigation showed that a commercial radio signal north of Burtonwood interfered with aircraft's radio compass, giving a false reading.

9 January
A Lockheed F-80 Shooting Star fell out of formation during a pass by spectators at the All-American Air Maneuvers in Miami, crashed and exploded.

12 January
During the Berlin Airlift, the crash of Douglas C-54D-5-DC Skymaster 42-72629 (c/n 10734) on approach to Rhein-Main Air Base in Germany killed three crew: 1st Lt. Ralph H. Boyd, 1st Lt. Craig B. Ladd, and T/Sgt. Charles L. Putnam.

19 January
The first flight of a Martin XSSM-A-1 Matador test vehicle from White Sands Missile Range, New Mexico, ended in a crash.

3 February
The Lavochkin I-176, powered by a Klimov VK-1 engine (the first Soviet aircraft to break Mach 1, in a shallow dive), was lost in a crash which killed test pilot Oleg V. Sokolovsky. Authorities selected the Mikoyan MiG-15 fighter, also powered by the VK-1, for production.

10 February
USAF Douglas A-26B-66-DL Invader 44-34719 out of Greenville AFB in South Carolina, piloted by Robert L. Kenyon, crashed in Waples Pond, Delaware. Four were killed.

2 March
Two USMC Reserve Grumman F6F-5N Hellcats, BuNo. 94202 (c/n A-11954, WF 9) and BuNo. 94182 (WF 14) out of MCAS El Toro, crashed at the 9,500-foot level of the south slope of Mt. Baldy, California. The wreckage was discovered on 6 March. Also on this date, Vought F4U-4B Corsair BuNo 97448 (AB 16) was reported missing since 14:30; its last report was that it was near Santa Cruz Island. Its wreckage and the body of its pilot were found on the island on 5 March.

15 March
The second prototype of three Vought XF7U-1 Cutlass twin-tailed fighters, BuNo 122473, was lost on a test flight over Chesapeake Bay from NAS Patuxent River in Maryland. Test pilot William H. B. Millar was killed.

1 April
The tip tank of a Dow AFB-based Republic F-84B Thunderjet came off during a Lewiston, Maine parade flyover and hit the Lewiston Public Works Garage.

20 April
The crash of Lockheed F-80A-10-LO Shooting Star 44-85438 (c/n 080-1461) on takeoff from Kirtland AFB in New Mexico at 16:40 during a cross-country proficiency flight killed USAF Reserve Col. Robert L. Coffey. Coffey, a World War II ace (six victories) with 97 missions in the Republic P-47 Thunderbolt and deputy group commander of the 365th Fighter Group of the 9th Air Force who had been shot down and evaded capture, had resigned his regular commission to enter politics. He was elected to the 81st United States Congress (D-Pa.) and was on an Air Force training flight while the House was in recess when he was killed. Coffey and fellow Hell Hawks pilot William D. Ritchie had departed Kirtland for March AFB in California after refueling; due to apparent engine failure on takeoff, the fighter never rose above 25 feet (7.6 m), skidded off the end of the runway, cartwheeled across an arroyo, and broke apart. Coffey, who was killed instantly, is buried in Arlington National Cemetery; the House of Representatives recessed for one day in his honor.

29 April
The first of two prototypes of the McDonnell XF-85 Goblin parasite fighter, 45–523 (piloted by McDonnell test pilot Edwin F. Schoch), made its only flight. After launching from a trapeze suspended below Boeing EB-29B Superfortress 44-84111 named "Monstro", Schoch was unable to hook up for retrieval and belly-landed on a dry lake bed at Muroc Air Force Base in California. After six flights by the Goblin totaling about 2 1/2 hours of flight time, the U.S. Air Force abandoned the test program. Both prototypes are in museum collections.

4 May
USAF North American F-82F Twin Mustang 46–468 out of Mitchel Field crashed into an unfinished house on Fulton Avenue near Duncan Road in a residential neighborhood of Hempstead, New York near Hofstra University. The plane burst into flames, but neither pilot 2nd Lt. Andrew Wallace nor radar observer 1st Lt. Bryan Jolley were killed; Wallace used a brick from the house to smash the right canopy and rescue Jolley.

20 May
USAF Fairchild C-82A Packet 48–572 (c/n 10207) from the 1227th Air Base Group in Goose Bay, Labrador, veered off the runway during takeoff at remote Arctic Isachsen airstrip, Isachsen weather station, Ellef Ringnes Island, Northwest Territory, Canada, at 17:45 UTC. Despite crew attempts to keep the aircraft from drifting to the left, the port landing gear caught a snowbank (increasing veer); the port propeller struck a snowpack at 90 mph and 2800 rpm, ripping the engine from its mount and making the aircraft uncontrollable. Three crew were uninjured, but the aircraft was written off and abandoned on site. Its hull used for a temporary shelter, the wreckage remains on site. The C-82 had delivered an engine and parts to repair Douglas C-54D-5-DC Skymaster 42-72614, stranded with a failed number-two engine, and the Skymaster's position had necessitated a downwind takeoff.

20 May
A U.S. Navy Banshee F2H1 crashed into Chesapeake Bay during an armaments demonstration at NAS Patuxent River, killing the pilot, 29-year-old USMC Capt. Alvin J. Jensen, a World War II ace and Navy Cross recipient credited with shooting down 30 Japanese planes. The Banshee's left wing tore loose as Jensen pulled out of a dive from 40,000 feet (12,000 m) to make a strafing run over the water. 800 spectators, including Jensen's wife, witnessed the accident.

25 May
Silverplate Boeing B-29-35-MO Superfortress 44-27299 of the 97th Bomb Group at Biggs AFB in Texas, experienced a fire in its number-four (starboard outer) engine shortly after takeoff for a routine navigation and radar-training mission. Unable to extinguish the blaze, the crew bailed out. The navigator's parachute did not open, and he was killed; it is believed that he hit his head on the nosegear operating assembly while bailing out. The B-29 made a 2-mile (3.2 km) circle before coming down 35 miles (56 km) northeast of El Paso, Texas and exploding.

30 May
Armstrong Whitworth Aircraft test pilot John O. "Jo" Lancaster was the first British pilot to save himself with an ejection seat when he bailed out of experimental twin-jet flying wing Armstrong Whitworth A.W.52 TS363 out of Bitteswell, using a "primitive" Martin-Baker Mk.1 seat when a pitch oscillation developed during a shallow dive from about 5,000 feet (1,500 m).

3 June
The sole Sukhoi Su-15 (Aircraft P) twin-engine jet all-weather interceptor developed severe vibration during its 39th test flight and broke up in mid-air, forcing pilot S. N. Anokhin to eject. The project was abandoned with the second prototype unfinished.

13 June
"SANTA MONICA, June 14 (AP) - A Navy transport, with seven men aboard dead, was located today as fog lifted from the Santa Monica mountains where the plane crashed late last night. The fog prevented an aerial search for much of today, but an Air Force plane finally spotted the still-smoking wreckage in Stone canyon, just below Mulholland drive, in the hills back of here. All seven dead were members of the naval reserve from the naval air station at Memphis, Tenn. Moffett field said those aboard were Lt. Garland P. Strickland Jr., Memphis, the pilot; Lt. Robert Lafferty, co-pilot; Lts. Marshall H. Jones and Walter E. Paul and enlisted men Warren E. Thomas, Thomas S. Daniel and Raymond Wigninton."

Just before 14 June
"TOKYO, June 14 (UP) - The U. S. Air Force today disclosed the names of six airmen killed or missing when a rescue squadron crash boat caught fire recently near Sendai, Japan. The missing included: First Lt. Ralph L. Fish, officer in charge of the boat section, Casa Grande, Ariz."

15 June
Sole prototype reconnaissance Gloster Meteor FR Mk. 5 VT347 broke up in the air during its first flight, killing pilot Rodney Dryland. The version was abandoned.

== July–December 1949 ==
11 July
Midshipman Virgil O. Gillette, 20, a U.S. Navy pilot trainee, was killed when his Vought F4U-4 Corsair struck a parked North American SNJ Texan at Naval Auxiliary Air Station Corry Field in Florida when returning from field-carrier landing practice. The port wing struck an SNJ in a parking area; the Corsair cartwheeled onto its back, killing the pilot instantly. Midshipman Hampton F. Hobson, in the rear cockpit of the SNJ, escaped injury.

13 July
"SAN DIEGO, July 13 (AP) - A Navy pilot crash landed his Douglas Sky Raider plane in the ocean two miles south of Coronado today after a fire developed in the cockpit. The pilot, Lt. (jg) Claude B. Whittle, 22, of Coronado, escaped injury, the Navy said. He brought the plane down near a tuna boat, which picked him up and took him to North island naval air station.[sic] He was attached to attack squadron 114." VA-114 was re-designated from VA-11A on 15 July 1948, and was disestablished on 1 December 1949.

14 July
Fairchild C-82A-15-FA Packet 44-23014 (c/n 10058) crashed in an Area B parking lot at Wright-Patterson AFB in Ohio. While conducting routine drop testing in Area C of the base, the C-82 attempted an emergency landing in Area B. With its electrical system down and the right engine on fire, the plane landed about three-quarters down the runway. It ran off the end of the runway across a grassy area, plowed through a steel fence, and ran over a number of cars in the main parking lot near Highway 4 before flipping onto its back. Fire crews were on the scene immediately. The only person killed was MSgt Lubitz of the Flight Test Division, who jumped from the plane just before it hit the fence. The other four crew were slightly injured, and no one on the ground was hurt.

25 July
RCAF World War II ace Squadron Leader Robert Allan "Bob" Kipp, DSO, DFC, commanding officer of No. 410 Squadron, was killed while practicing aerobatics in a de Havilland Vampire F.3 of the Blue Devils demonstration team.

9 August
US Navy pilot Lt. J. L. "Pappy" Fruin of VF-101 lost control of his McDonnell F2H-1 Banshee at 500 mph and 30,000 feet and ejected over Walterboro, South Carolina, the first American Naval aviator to use an ejector seat during an in-flight emergency. VF-101 was the first Navy unit to receive the seat.

12 August
Third of three Saunders-Roe SR.A/1 jet-powered flying-boat fighter prototypes TG271 (design specification E.6/44) was written off after hitting a submerged obstruction and sinking in the Solent off Cowes, Isle of Wight; Royal Navy pilot Lt. Cdr. Eric "Winkle" Brown survived, and the design was not produced.

After August
Second of three Saunders-Roe SR.A/1 jet-powered flying-boat fighter prototypes TG267 (design specification E.6/44) crashed into the sea during practice for an air show, killing the pilot. The design was not produced.

15 September
The first Convair B-36 Peacemaker loss occurs when B-36B 44-92079 of the 9th Bomb Squadron, 7th Bomb Wing, crashed into Lake Worth during a night "maximum effort" mission takeoff from Carswell AFB in Texas. Five of the 13 crew were killed. The cause was attributed to two propellers going into reverse pitch; the wreckage was removed from the lake and scrapped.

26 September
Boeing B-29-50-MO Superfortress 44-86333, modified as TB-29 of the 352d Bombardment Squadron, 301st Bombardment Wing, Smoky Hill Air Force Base in Kansas, crashed in the Kiamichi Mountains 6 miles (10 km) southwest of Talihina, Oklahoma, carrying 13 crew members on a reportedly-routine training flight. The aircraft, consumed by fire, was damaged beyond repair. Nine bodies were recovered. Witnesses reported that one engine failed before the crash; the aircraft was in a spin, and exploded before impact.

30 September
First Avro 707 delta-wing research aircraft VX784, first flown on 6 September 1949 (one source says 4 September), crashed near Blackbushe on a test flight from Boscombe Down. Avro test pilot Squadron Leader Samuel Eric Esler, DFC, AE, was killed, and the cause was never established.

3 October
The first of two prototypes of Kellett XR-10 helicopter 45-22793 crashed due to a control-system failure, killing chief Kellett test pilot Dave Driskill. The project was abandoned shortly thereafter.

4 October
Grumman XTB3F-2S Guardian BuNo 90505, prototype of the ASW variant, underwent propeller-vibration tests by Grumman in New York. It had a prop failure and crashed on Long Island, killing the Hamilton Standard representative in the rear fuselage. Pilot Mike Ritchie made a high-speed, 200-foot parachute escape, but landed on top of the wreckage and was hospitalized for many months.

9 October
Douglas C-47A-90-DL Skytrain 43-16062 (c/n 20528) of the 6th Rescue Squadron, Air Rescue Service, MATS, based at Goose Bay, Labrador, failed to reach sufficient air speed on takeoff from the Isachsen airstrip at the abandoned Isachsen weather station, Ellef Ringnes Island, Northwest Territory at 18:00 UTC, lifting off twice before its landing skis contacted rising terrain and collapsed. The causes were icing and overloading. Four crew and six passengers had minor injuries. The airframe was abandoned in place, where it remains.

31 October
Westland Wyvern test program had a setback when second prototype Wyvern TF Mk 2 (N.12/45) VP113, powered by an Armstrong Siddeley Python turboprop, crashed in an attempted dead-stick landing after the propellers seized in flight. The test pilot was killed.

1 November
Lockheed P-38L Lightning NX26297 flown by a Bolivian Air Force pilot collided in midair with Eastern Airlines Flight 537 (Douglas DC-4 airliner N88727) on its final approach to National Airport. All 55 people aboard the Douglas DC-4 died; Bridaux, considered one of Bolivia's most experienced pilots, survived with injuries. Among the dead were Congressman George J. Bates and former Congressman Michael J. Kennedy. The DC-4 wreckage came down on the Virginia shore of the Potomac River north of Mount Vernon. At the time, it was the worst plane crash in the history of civil aviation. Bridaux was cleared of causing the accident, now believed to have been an air traffic control error.

9 November
A US Navy Consolidated PB4Y-2 Privateer on a training flight crash-landed south of Mikkalo, Oregon, after all four engines "froze up" in flight. One person was killed.

16 November
A USAF B-29 on a flight from March Air Force Base in California to England via Bermuda went down at sea when it ran out of fuel. Of the 20 crew, two were missing; 18 were rescued on 19 November, 385 miles northeast of Bermuda.

22 November
First prototype Gloster E.1/44 TX145, on a test flight from the Royal Aircraft Establishment (RAE) in Farnborough, had an engine flame-out, crash-landed, and was repaired.

29 November
Fairey Gannet VR546 crashed on takeoff from Fairey's flight-test airfield in White Waltham, Berkshire, after violent porpoising at uncontrollable speed. Repairs took three months, and test flying did not resume until March 1950.

11 December
North American F-51D-25-NT Mustang 45-11353 of the 192d Fighter Squadron, Nevada Air National Guard, crashed at Reno Air Force Base in Nevada during a mock dogfight. Reno native 1st Lt. Croston K. Stead was killed, and the base was renamed Stead Air Force Base in January 1951 in his honor.

22 December
USAF Boeing B-50A-30-BO Superfortress 47–110 (c/n 15794) of the 2d Bombardment Group crashed in swampland on the banks of the Savannah River about seven miles above Savannah, Georgia five minutes after taking off (at 21:12) from Chatham AFB, four miles east-northeast of the airfield. The bomber was on a training flight to Biggs AFB in El Paso, Texas. All eleven on board were killed. The crash site was less than two miles from U.S. Highway 17 (which crosses the river just above Savannah), but could only be reached by small boats guided by boatmen who knew the river. The Air Force waited until dawn to send a large crash boat with 20 or more men, armed with shovels and ropes, to try to remove the bodies; they had to transfer to small, flat-bottomed swamp boats to get to the wreckage. Capt. E. S. Harrison, public information officer, said that the wreckage would cover a football field. Salvage workers sank up to their armpits in the mire. The men aboard the plane were identified as Capt. George V. Swearingen, pilot, and aircraft commander, Columbia, South Carolina; Capt. Andrew G. Walker, pilot, Norfolk, Virginia; Lt. Rogers Hornsby Jr., 29, son of Rogers Hornsby of baseball fame; 1st Lt. Robert W. Beckman, bombardier, Birmingham, Alabama; Capt. Anthony C. Colandro, radar navigator, Baltimore, Maryland; 1st Lt. James W. Johnson Jr., flight engineer, Wells, West Virginia; T/Sgt. Leonard B. Hughes, flight engineer, Denison, Texas; S/Sgt. Fred W. Cunningham, radio operator and gunner, New Orleans, Louisiana; S/Sgt. Manson L. Gregg, gunner, Meadow, Texas; S/Sgt. Garnell W. Myers, gunner, Franklin, Indiana; and S/Sgt. Billy C. Bristol, gunner, Tucson, Arizona.

== See also ==
- List of accidents and incidents involving military aircraft
