= List of Douglas A-1 Skyraider operators =

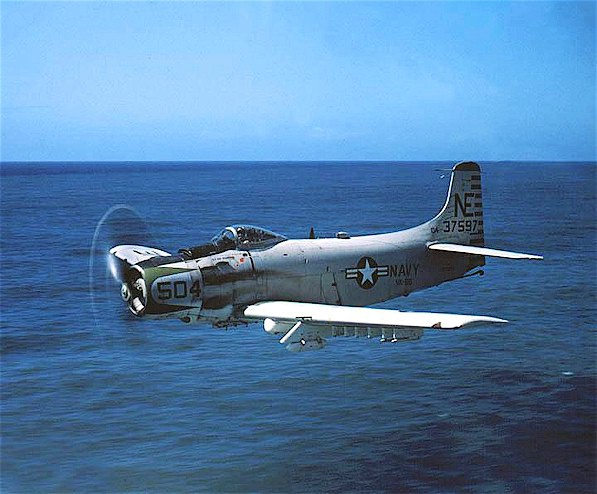
VA-25 AD-6 operating from USS Midway

The Douglas A-1 Skyraider, a single-seat attack bomber was operated by eight nations, primarily the United States.

== Operators ==
=== Cambodia ===
Khmer Royal Aviation (AVRK)

=== Chad ===
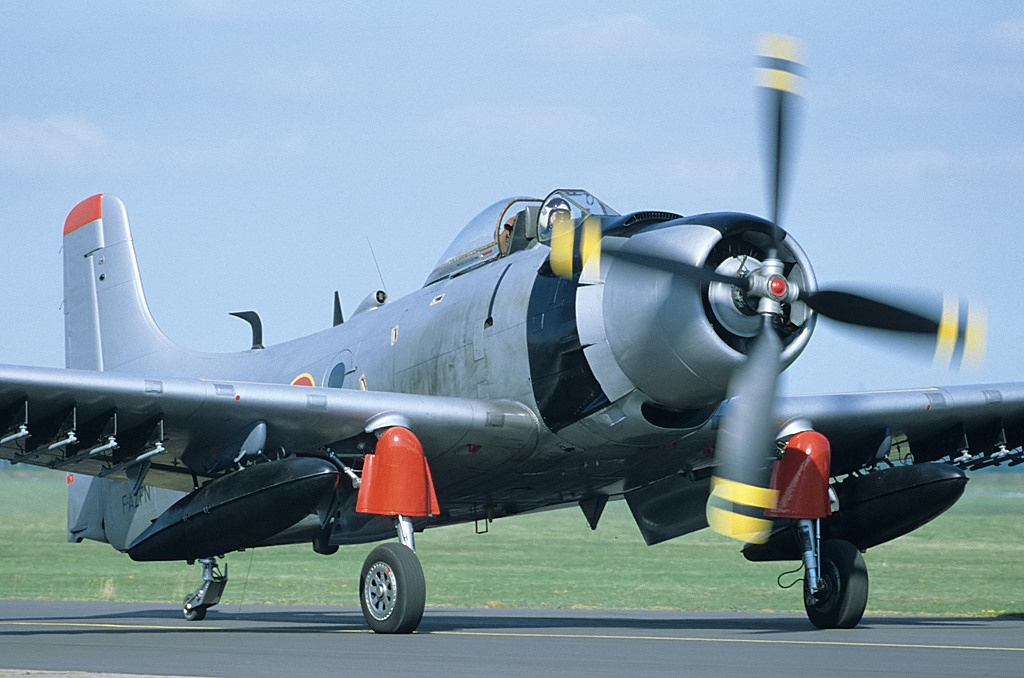
Ex-Chad Air Force Douglas AD-4N Skyraider.

Chad Air Force

=== France ===
Armée de l'Air

- Escadron 2/20 Ouarsenis
- Escadron 1/20 Aures-Nementchas
- Escadron 3/20 Oranie
- Escadron d'Appui Aerien 1/21
- Escadron de Marche 2/21
- Escadrille Legere d'Appui Aerien 1/22 Ain

=== Gabon ===
Garde Présidentielle - Presidential Guard

=== South Vietnam ===
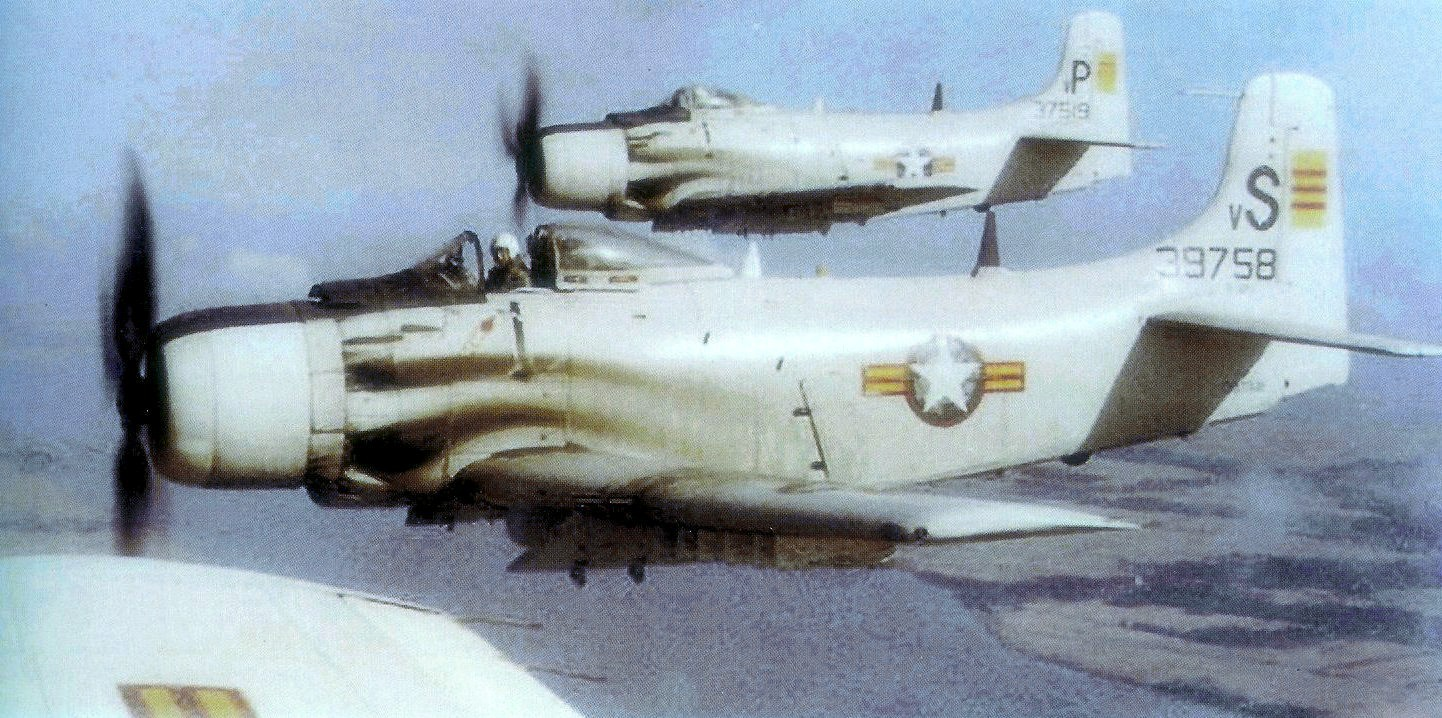
A-1H of the Republic of Vietnam Air Force 520th Fighter Squadron, Binh Thuy Air Base

Republic of Vietnam Air Force

- 514th Fighter Squadron (formerly 1st Fighter Squadron)
- 516th Fighter Squadron (formerly 2nd Fighter Squadron)
- 518th Fighter Squadron
- 520th Fighter Squadron
- 522nd Fighter Squadron
- 524th Fighter Squadron
- 530th Fighter Squadron

=== Sweden ===
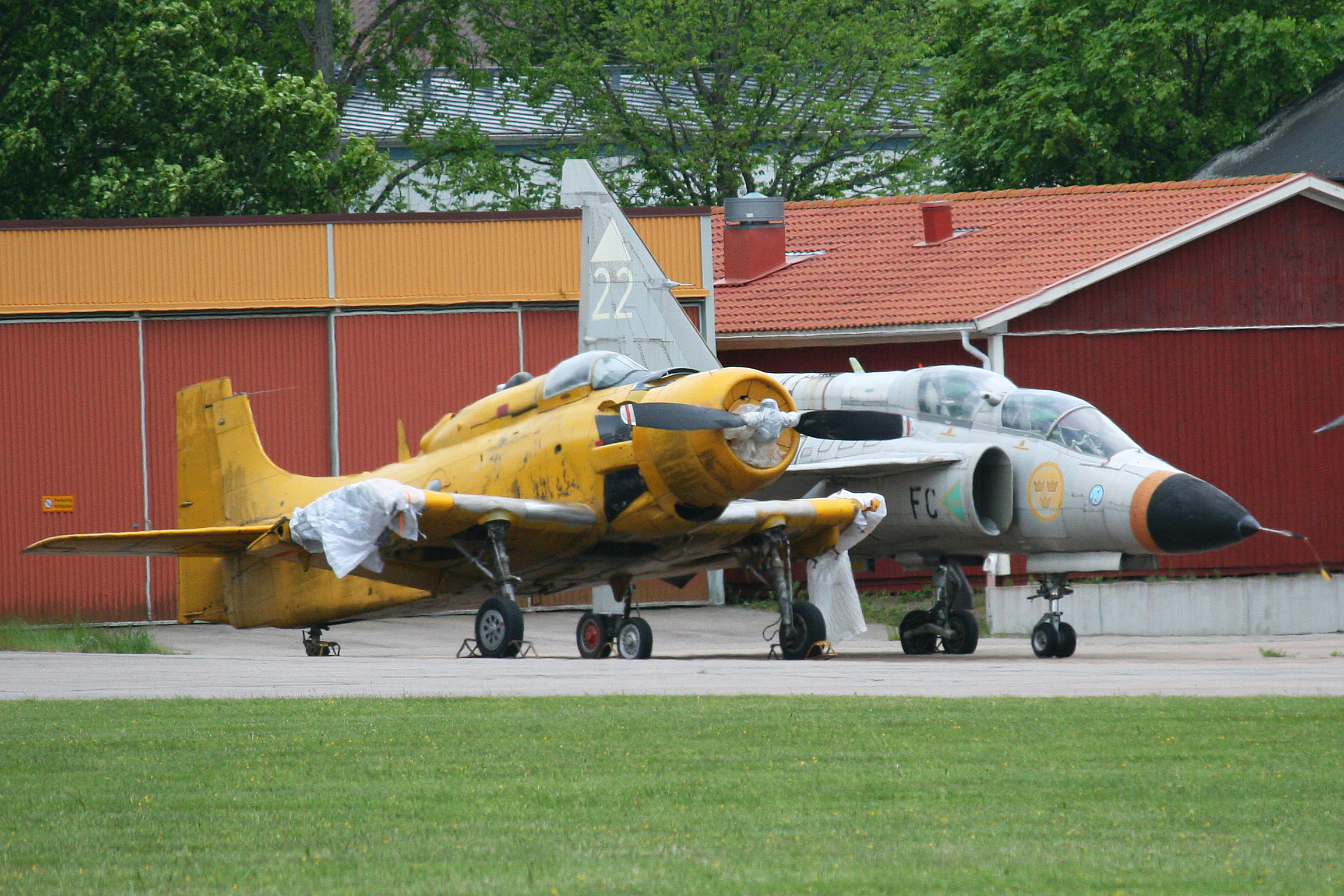
A Swedish Skyraider in outdoor storage at the Swedish Air Force Museum.

Svensk Flygtjänst AB operated 14 ex-Royal Navy Fleet Air Arm Skyraiders, modified for use as target tugs for the Swedish Air Force.

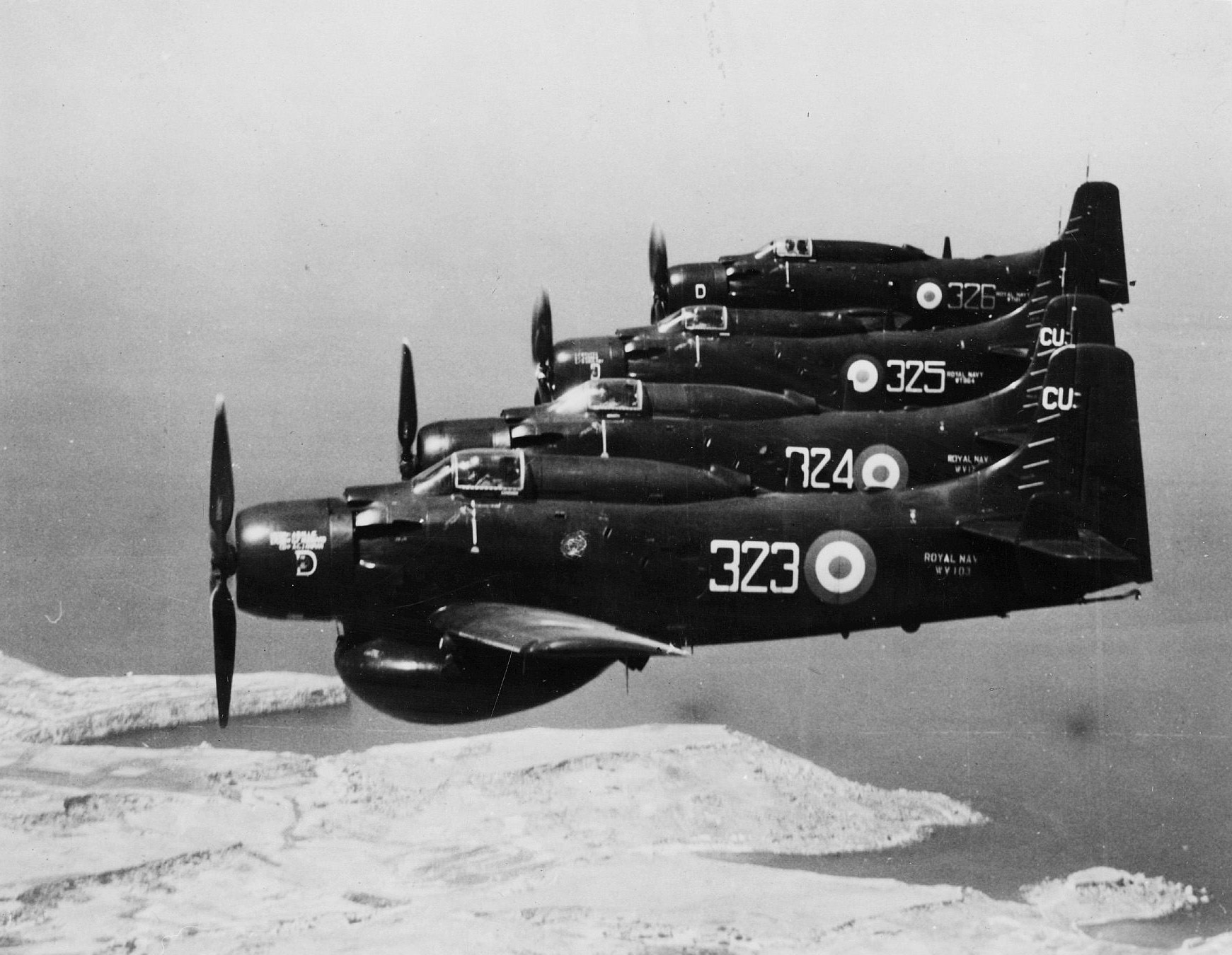
Skyraider AEW.1s of 778 NAS in flight.

=== United Kingdom ===
The Royal Navy received 50 AD-4Ws which were given the designation Skyraider AEW.1 These were used from 1951 until 1962.

Fleet Air Arm

- 849 Naval Air Squadron
- 778 Naval Air Squadron (RNAS Culdrose, aircrew training 1951-1952)

=== United States ===
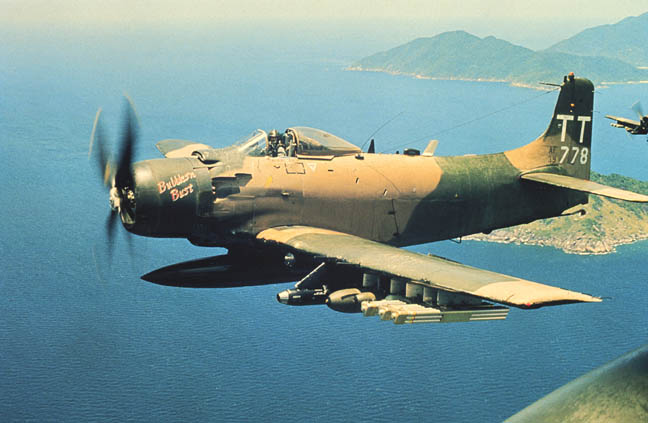
An A-1H of the 602nd SOS in Vietnam, 1970.

United States Air Force

- 1st Air Commando Squadron, Composite (later 1st Air Commando, Fighter; and 1st Special Operations Squadron) "Hobo"
- 6th Special Operations Squadron "Spad"
- 22d Special Operations Squadron "Zorro"
- 602d Air Commando Squadron (later 602d Fighter Squadron (Commando); and 602d Special Operations Squadron) "Firefly"
- 4407th Combat Crew Training Squadron

United States Navy

- VA-1L
- VFAW-4
- VAW-11
- VAW-12
- VAW-13
- VA-3: VA-3B/VA-44 (AD-1)
- VA-4: VA-4B/VA-45 (AD-1)
- VA-15
- VA-16
- VA-19A: VA-19A (AD-1)
- VA-24
- VA-25 (A-1H)
- VAQ-33 (EA-1F)
- VA-35
- VA-42
- VA-45
- VA-52 (A-1H)
- VA-54
- VA-55 (AD-4)
- VA-64
- VA-65
- VA-74
- VA-75
- VA-85
- VA-95
- VA-104
- VA-105
- VA-114
- VA-115
- VA-122
- VA-125
- VA-126
- VA-135
- VA-145 (A-1H)
- VA-152
- VA-154
- VA-155
- VA-165
- VA-174
- VA-175
- VA-176 (A-1H)
- VA-195
- VA-196
- VA-215

United States Marine Corps

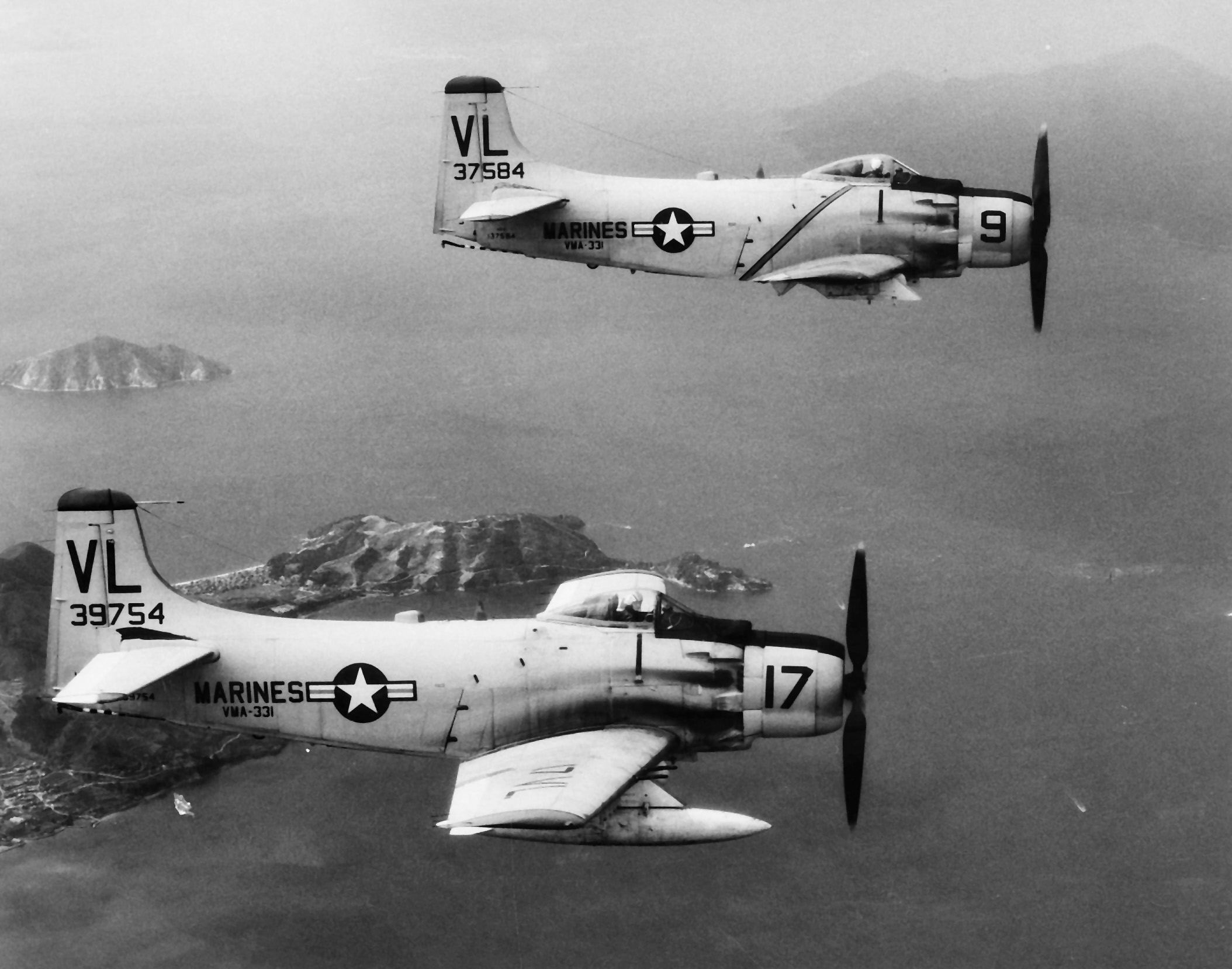
AD-6s of VMA-331 in 1959.

Note - only VMA-121, VMA-251 and VMC-1 flew the AD-1 during combat missions in the Korean War.

- VMC-1
- VMC-2
- VMC-3
- VMAT-10
- VMAT-20
- VMA-121 (AD-3)
- VMA-211
- VMA-212
- VMA-225
- VMA-251
- VMA-324
- VMA-331
- VMA-332

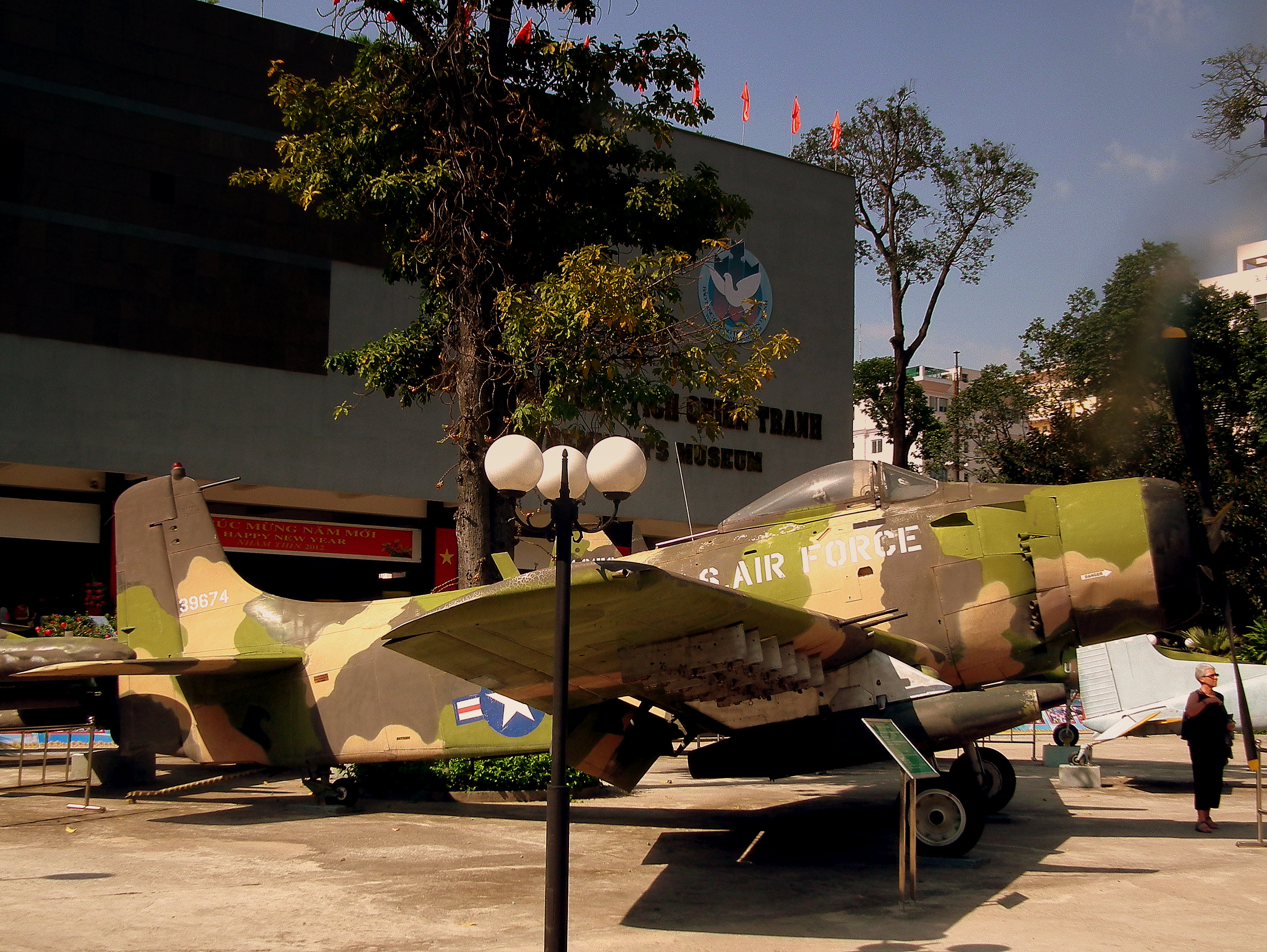
A captured South Vietnamese A-1 with fake markings.
