= VA95 =

VA-95 has the following meanings:

- VA-95 (U.S. Navy), an attack squadron in service from 1943 to 1949
- Second VA-95 (U.S. Navy), an attack squadron in service from 1952 to 1970
- Third VA-95 (U.S. Navy), an attack squadron in service from 1972 to 1995
- Virginia State Route 95, a former state highway in Virginia

== See also ==
- Interstate 95 in Virginia, an Interstate Highway in Virginia
