= Katmai =

Katmai may refer to:

- Katmai National Park and Preserve, a park in Alaska
- Mount Katmai, a volcano in the Katmai Park in Alaska; the site of a colossal 1912 eruption
- Katmai (microprocessor), a Pentium III computer microprocessor core
- USS Mount Katmai (AE-16), an ammunition ship in the US Navy from 1945 to 1973
- Katmai Bay, a United States Coast Guard cutter
- Microsoft SQL Server 2008's codename
