= VA 16 =

VA-16 or VA 16 may refer to:

- VA-16 (U.S. Navy), a U.S. Navy Attack Squadron active from 1955 to 1958
- Virginia's 16th congressional district, an obsolete U.S. congressional district
- Virginia State Route 16, a state highway
- State Route 16 (Virginia 1918-1940), a former state highway
