= Donald D. Engen =

American admiral

Donald Davenport Engen
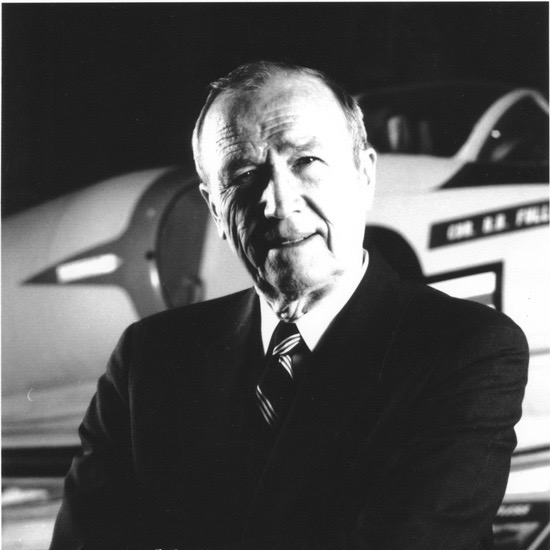
- Vice Admiral Don Engen
- Born: 28 May 1924; Pomona, California, U.S.
- Died: 13 July 1999 (aged 75); Minden, Nevada, U.S.
- Burial place: Arlington National Cemetery
- Relatives: Hunter Ellis (grandson)
- Military career
- Allegiance: United States
- Branch: United States Navy
- Service years: 1942–1978
- Rank: Vice admiral
- Commands: VF-21; Carrier Air Group 11; USS Mount Katmai; USS America; Carrier Division Four; Deputy US Atlantic Command
- Conflicts: World War II; Korean War
- Awards: Navy Cross; Legion of Merit; Distinguished Flying Cross

Donald Davenport Engen (28 May 1924 – 13 July 1999) was a United States Navy vice admiral, Administrator of the Federal Aviation Administration (FAA) and Director of the National Air and Space Museum.

== Education ==
Engen graduated from Pasadena High School in May 1941 and then attended Pasadena City College until leaving to join the U.S. Navy.

== US Navy career ==
=== World War II ===
Engen entered the Naval Aviation Cadet Program on 9 June 1942, he soloed in August and in September 1942 was sent to naval preflight school. In October 1942, Engen was assigned to Naval Air Station Los Alamitos for primary training, then in February 1943 was sent to Naval Air Station Corpus Christi for further training. He next attended advanced training at Naval Air Station Kingsville, graduating as a Naval Aviator on 9 June 1943.

Engen was assigned to Bombing Squadron 3 (VB-3) at Naval Air Station Daytona Beach for operational training in dive-bombing. In August 1943, Engen carrier-qualified by making 8 landings on USS Sable then joined Bombing Squadron 19 (VB-19), flying the Curtiss SB2C Helldiver; nicknamed "the Big-Tailed Beast" by Navy personnel at NAS Los Alamitos.

In January 1944, Carrier Air Group 19 (CAG-19) embarked on the USS Lexington for transit to Hawaii, offloading at Ford Island. From January–June 1944, VB-19 underwent further training at bases in Hawaii before deploying with the rest of CAG-19 aboard the USS Intrepid to the southwest Pacific arriving at Enewetak Atoll, where they transferred to the USS Lexington. On 14 July 1944, Lexington left Enewetak to support the invasion of Guam and Engen later sank a Japanese freighter. In October 1944, VB-19 fought in the Battle of Leyte Gulf; Engen participated in the sinking of the Japanese aircraft carrier Zuikaku and was one of 32 VB-19 pilots to be awarded the Navy Cross for their role in the battle. On 5 November 1944, Engen and the rest of VB-19 participated in the sinking of the Japanese cruiser Nachi in Manila Bay. On 23 November, CAG-19 was replaced by Carrier Air Group 20 and it embarked for transport to Hawaii and then on to San Diego. In early 1945, Engen was assigned to the newly formed VBF-19 at Naval Air Station North Island and was undergoing further training in Hawaii when the Japan surrendered. In addition to the Navy Cross, Engen was awarded the Distinguished Flying Cross and Air Medal for his service in the Pacific.

=== Korean War ===
Engen was released from active service on 1 February 1946, although he continued to serve in the United States Navy Reserve with VF-716 at Naval Air Station Los Alamitos. Engen worked briefly as an engineer for Consolidated Vultee before rejoining the Navy in August 1946. From October 1946 until May 1947, he worked in pilotless aircraft programs at Naval Auxiliary Air Station Chincoteague and the Naval Air Missile Test Center. He attended the University of California, Los Angeles from June 1947 until September 1948. In October 1948, he was assigned to VF-212, serving as operations officer. He subsequently joined VF-52, where he jet-qualified on the TO-1 Shooting Star, then joined VF-51, flying FJ-1s and then F9F-2s. In April 1950, VF-51 embarked on USS Valley Forge for a western Pacific deployment which saw the start of the Korean War. On 3 July 1950, Engen participated in the first jet combat missions attacking an airfield near Pyongyang and engaging North Korean Yak-9 fighters. Engen would be awarded a further two Air Medals for his service in Korea.

=== Late 1950s ===
Engen attended the General Line School, U.S. Naval Postgraduate School, Monterey, California from January to December 1951. From December 1952 to December 1953 he attended the Empire Test Pilots' School in England as an exchange officer and then served as a test pilot with Air Development Squadron Three (VX-3) from January 1954 to June 1955. From July 1955 to July 1957 Engen was executive officer of VF-121. From August 1957 to September 1959 he was assigned to the Naval Air Test Center, Patuxent River. In October 1959 he was appointed commander of VF-21.

=== 1960s-1970s ===
In January 1962 Engen was appointed commander of Carrier Air Group 11 and from early 1963 he served as operations officer on the USS Coral Sea. In April 1964, he received his first command as captain of the USS Mount Katmai. He would command the ship until 31 August 1965 when he left to attend the Naval War College, in preparation for taking command of USS America. On 21 July 1966, Engen became Captain of USS America. During this command the USS Liberty incident took place and America launched aircraft to engage the attackers before being ordered to recall the aircraft. In July 1967, Engen passed command of America in Valletta and he returned to the US.

In September 1967 he received his Bachelors of Science in Business Administration from the George Washington University. In September 1968 he was assigned to the Chief of Naval Operations and headed the Aviation Plans Branch until February 1970. He then headed the Strategic Plans Branch until June 1971, a service for which he was awarded the Legion of Merit. In July 1971 he was appointed commander of Carrier Division Four and was awarded a Gold Star to the Legion of Merit for his service during this period. In June 1973, he was appointed Deputy Commander in Chief United States Naval Forces Europe, his final command was as Deputy Commander in Chief US Atlantic Command.

Engen retired in 1978 with the rank of Vice-admiral.

== Private career ==
Following his retirement from the Navy, Engen managed the Piper Aircraft plant in Lakeland, Florida.

== Government career ==
In 1982 he was appointed to the National Transportation Safety Board. On 10 April 1984 he was appointed Administrator of the FAA and held this role until 2 July 1987. In 1996 he was appointed Director of the National Air and Space Museum, a position which he held until his death.

== Personal life ==
He married Mary Baker on 23 September 1943 before being deployed to the Pacific theatre. The couple had four children: 3 sons (Travis, Charles and Christopher) and a daughter (Candace Ellis).

== Death ==
He and William S. Ivans died on 13 July 1999 when the glider they were flying broke up in flight near Minden, Nevada. He is buried at Arlington National Cemetery.

== Awards ==
- James H. Doolittle Award (1984)
- Yuri A. Gagarin Gold Medal (1992)
- L. Welch Pogue Award for Lifetime Achievement in Aviation (1996)
- Naval Aviation Hall of Honor (2004)

Engen was a recipient of the following military decorations and service medals: Navy Cross, Navy Distinguished Service Medal, Legion of Merit with Gold Star, Distinguished Flying Cross, Air Medal with two Gold Stars, Presidential Unit Citation Ribbon, Navy Unit Commendation Ribbon, American Campaign Medal, Asiatic-Pacific Campaign Medal with four Bronze Engagement Stars, World War II Victory Medal, China Service Medal, Navy Occupation Service Medal with ASIA Clasp, National Defense Service Medal with Bronze Star, Korean Service Medal, United Nations Service Medal, Vietnam Service Medal with Bronze Star, Philippine Liberation Ribbon with Bronze Star. Additionally, he was awarded the Korean Presidential Unit Citation Badge, Philippine Presidential Unit Citation Badge and Republic of Vietnam Campaign Medal with Device.

== Memorials ==
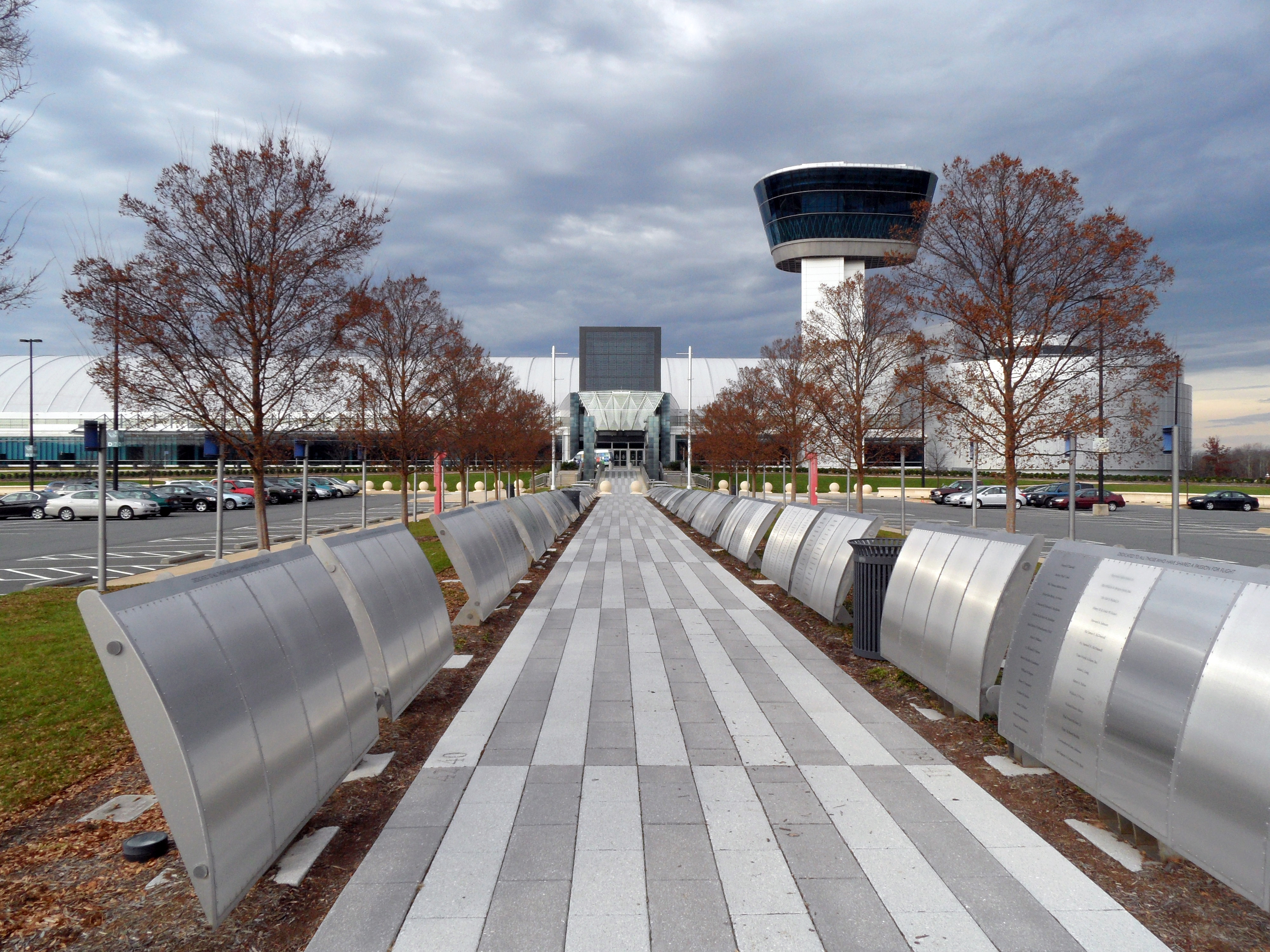
Donald D. Engen observation tower beside the entrance of the Steven F. Udvar-Hazy Center of the National Air and Space Museum

- The Donald D. Engen Observation Tower at the Steven F. Udvar-Hazy Center is named after him, while the Mary Baker Engen Restoration Hangar is named after his wife.
- The Naval Intelligence Professionals VADM Donald D. Engen Naval Intelligence Foundation Scholarship.
- The Aero Club Trophy for Aviation Excellence is awarded annually by the Aero Club of Washington, D.C. Renamed the Donald D. Engen Aero Club Trophy for Aviation Excellence. The permanent Trophy resides in the National Air & Space Museum. The criteria for the trophy include: technological advances; development of aviation policy acts of courage or professionalism; and lifetime achievements in the aviation field.

Government offices
Preceded by J. Lynn Helms	Administrator of the Federal Aviation Administration; 1984–1987	Succeeded by T. Allan McArtor
