= VF-41 =

Fighter Squadron 41
- Active: 1 June 1945 – June 1950
- Country: United States
- Branch: United States Navy
- Role: Fighter aircraft
- Part of: Inactive
- Nickname(s): Gay Blades
- Engagements: World War II

Aircraft flown
- Fighter: F4U-4 Corsair

Fighter Squadron 41 or VF-41 was an aviation unit of the United States Navy. Originally established as VF-75A on 1 June 1945, redesignated as VF-75 on 1 August 1945, redesignated as VF-3B on 15 November 1946, redesignated as VF-41 on 1 September 1948, it was disestablished in June 1950. It was the third US Navy squadron to be designated VF-41.

== Operational history ==
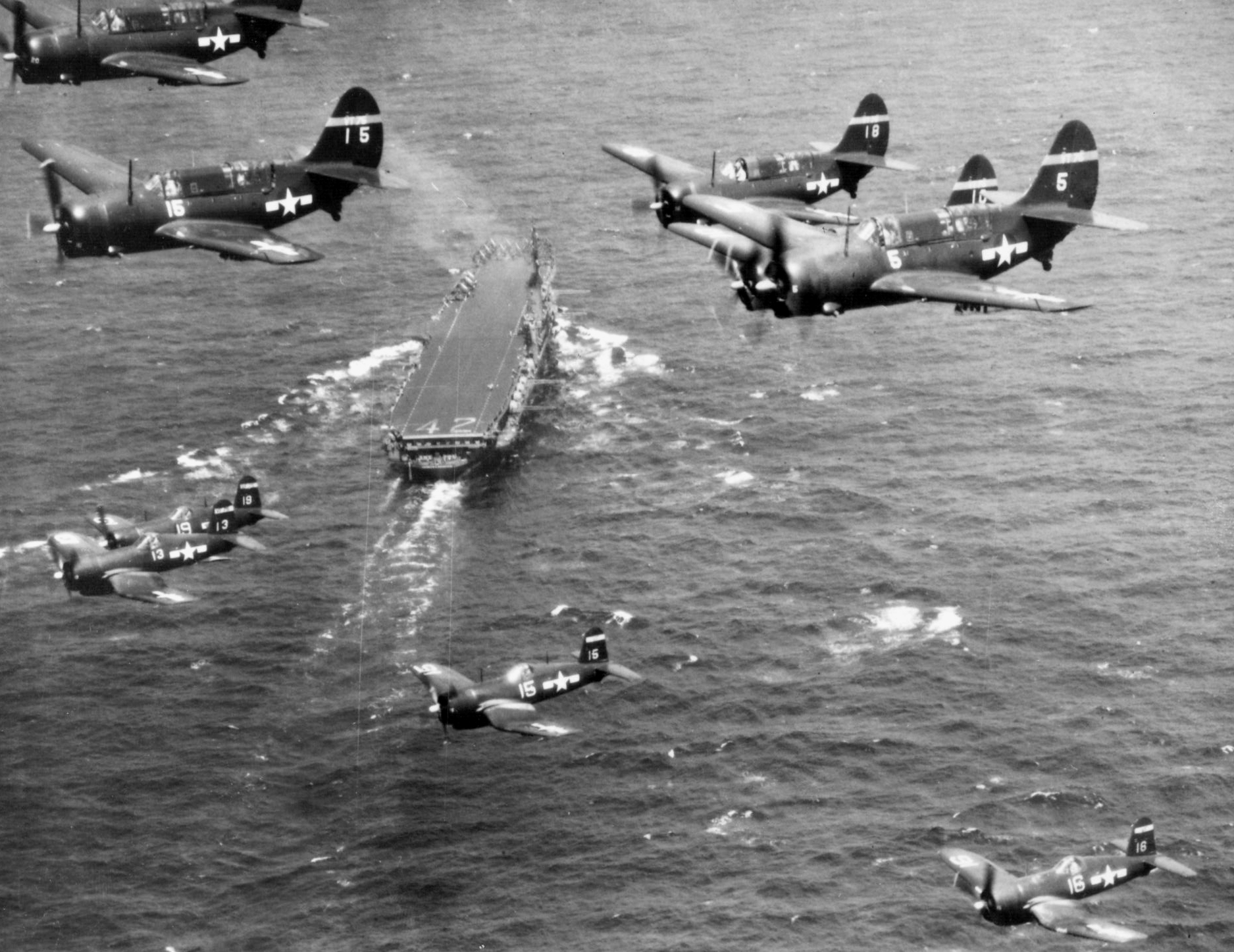
VF-75 F4U-4 s and VT-75 SB2C-4Es fly over USS Franklin D. Roosevelt in 1946

VF-75 was assigned to Carrier Air Group 75 (CVBG-75) aboard the USS Franklin D. Roosevelt for a Western Atlantic cruise from 19 April to 25 May 1946.

== Home port assignments ==
- NAS Chincoteague

== Aircraft assignment ==
- F4U-4 Corsair

== See also ==
- History of the United States Navy
- List of inactive United States Navy aircraft squadrons
- List of United States Navy aircraft squadrons
