= VA105 =

VA-105 has the following meanings:

- Attack Squadron 105 (U.S. Navy)
- State Route 105 (Virginia)
