= Second VA-45 (U.S. Navy) =

Attack Squadron 45
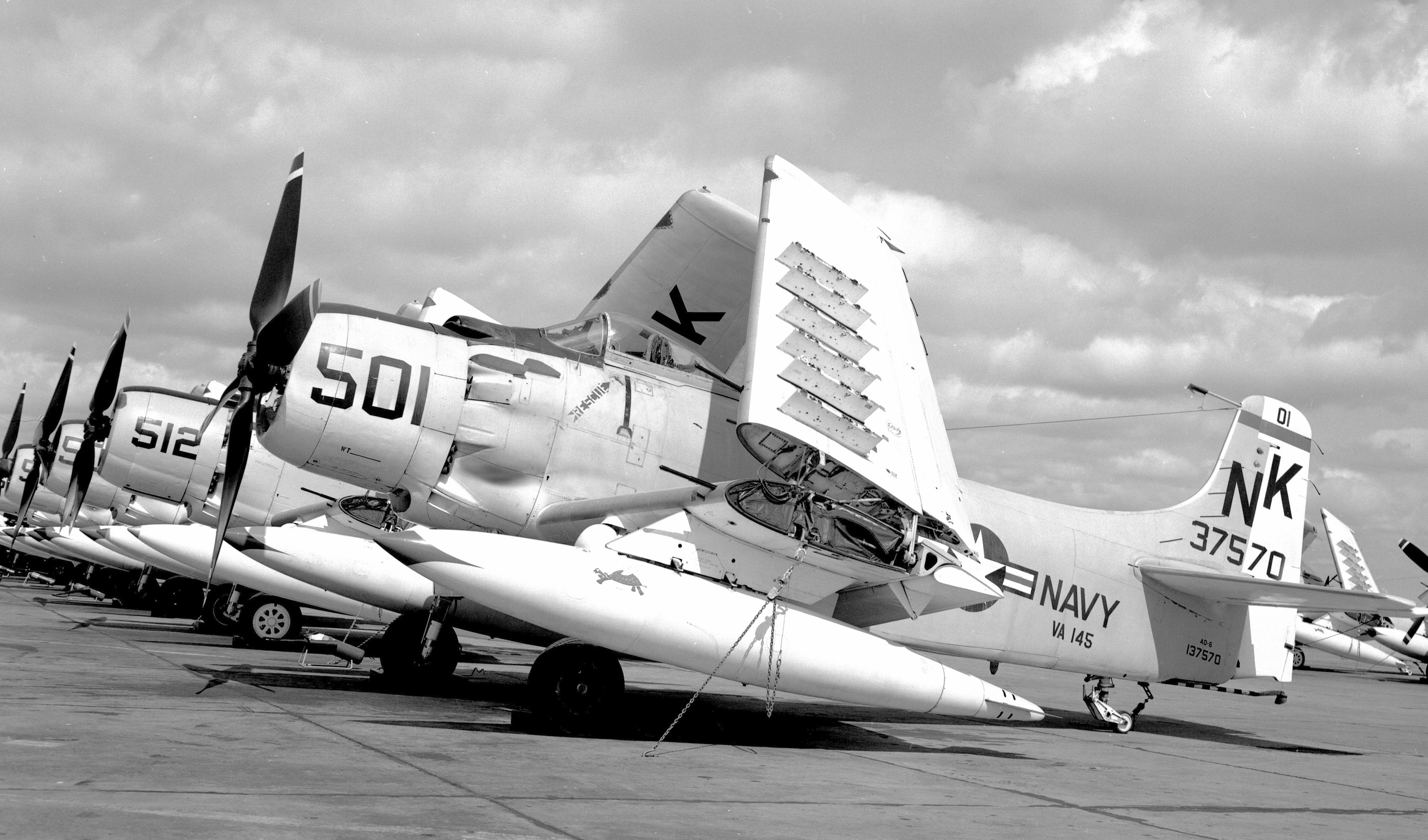
- AD-6 Skyraider as flown by VA-45 from 1954 onward
- Active: 1 September 1950 – 1 March 1958
- Country: United States
- Branch: United States Navy
- Type: Attack
- Nickname(s): Blackbirds
- Engagements: Korean War

Aircraft flown
- Attack: A-1 Skyraider

Second VA-45, nicknamed the Blackbirds, was an Attack Squadron of the United States Navy. The squadron was established on 1 September 1950. On 13 June 1953, the squadron flew its first combat operation while deployed to Korea aboard USS Lake Champlain. It was disestablished on 1 March 1958. It was the second squadron to be designated VA-45, the first VA-45 was disestablished on 8 June 1950.

== Home port assignments ==
The squadron was assigned to these home ports, effective on the dates shown:

- NAS Jacksonville – 1 Sep 1950
- NAAS Cecil Field – 18 Sep 1950
- NAS Jacksonville – 12 Oct 1952

== Aircraft assignment ==
The squadron first received the following aircraft in the months shown:

- AD-2 Skyraider – Sep 1950
- AD-4 Skyraider – Feb 1952
- AD-6 Skyraider – Jun 1954

== See also ==
- Attack aircraft
- History of the United States Navy
- List of inactive United States Navy aircraft squadrons
