= VMFP-3 =

Marine Tactical Reconnaissance Squadron 3
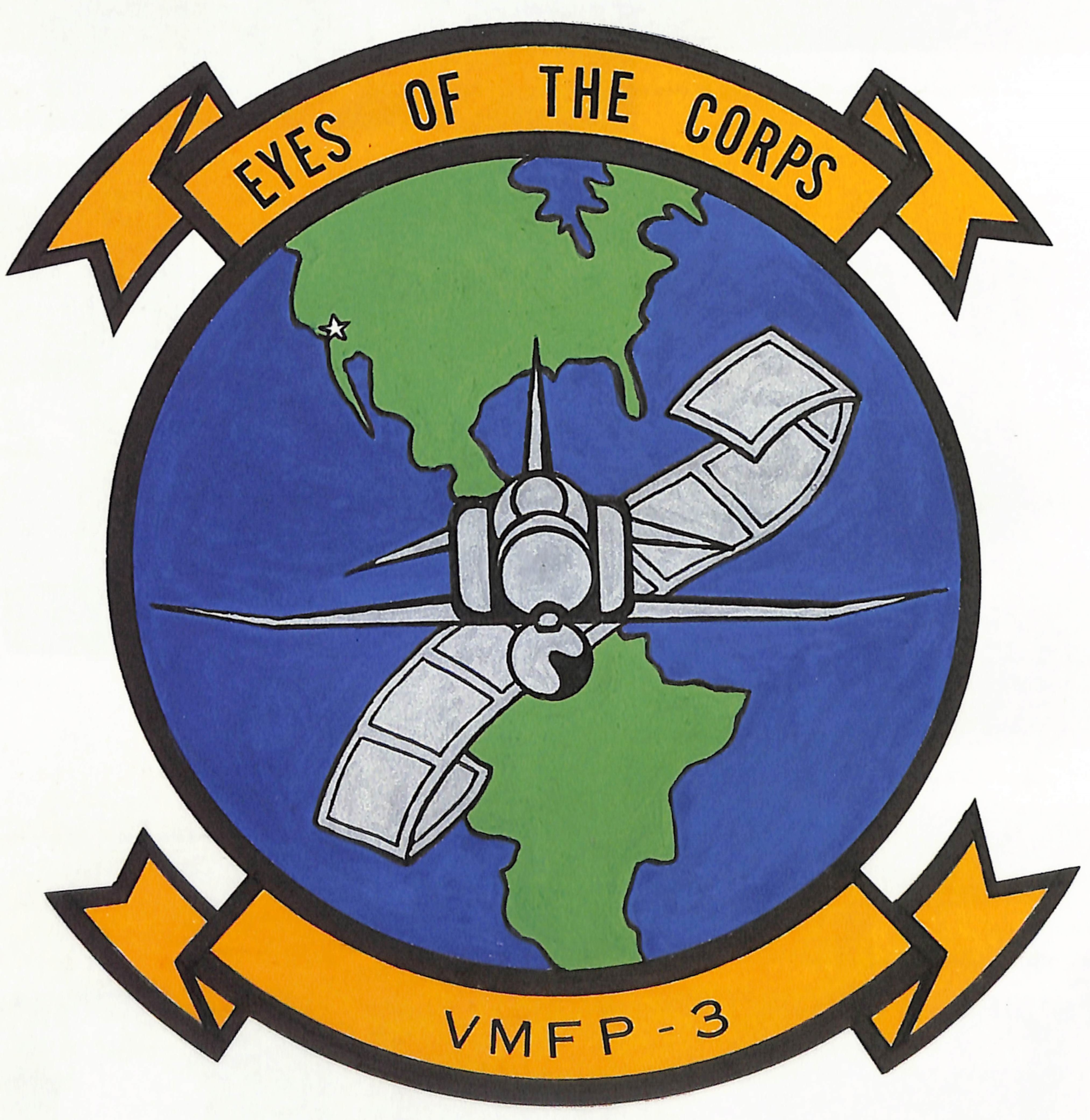
- VMFP-3 insignia
- Active: 1 July 1975 – 30 September 1990
- Country: United States of America
- Branch: United States Marine Corps
- Role: reconnaissance
- Part of: inactive
- Nickname(s): Eyes of the Corps
- tail code: RF

Marine Tactical Reconnaissance Squadron 3 (VMFP-3) was an aviation unit of the United States Marine Corps active between 1975 and 1990.

== Mission ==
Conduct aerial multisensor imagery reconnaissance, including aerial photographic, infrared, and side-looking airborne radar reconnaissance, in support of Fleet Marine Force operations.

== History ==
VMFP-3 was activated on 1 July 1975 as part of the 3rd Marine Aircraft Wing at Marine Corps Air Station El Toro, California (USA). The squadron was deactivated on 1 July 1990 ( see ALMAR24-1990).

Photo and electronic reconnaissance had previously been conducted by three Marine Composite Reconnaissance Squadrons (VMCJ-1, 2, 3) located at MCAS Iwakuni (Japan), MCAS Cherry Point, and MCAS El Toro, respectively. These squadrons (each flying RF-4Bs and EA-6As) were consolidated into two squadrons:VMAQ-2 at MCAS Cherry Point, operating all the EA-6s, and VMFP-3 operating all the RF-4Bs. Each squadron would deploy detachments to Iwakuni to fly missions previously flown by VMCJ-1.

Overseas detachments, in addition to supporting FMF operations, continued the 7th Fleet support initiated by VMCJ-1 in 1974. RF-4Bs of VMFP-3 were permanently deployed aboard the aircraft carrier USS Midway (CV-41) from 1975 to 1984. A six-plane detachment operated as part of Carrier Air Wing Five, while retaining their own tail code "RF."

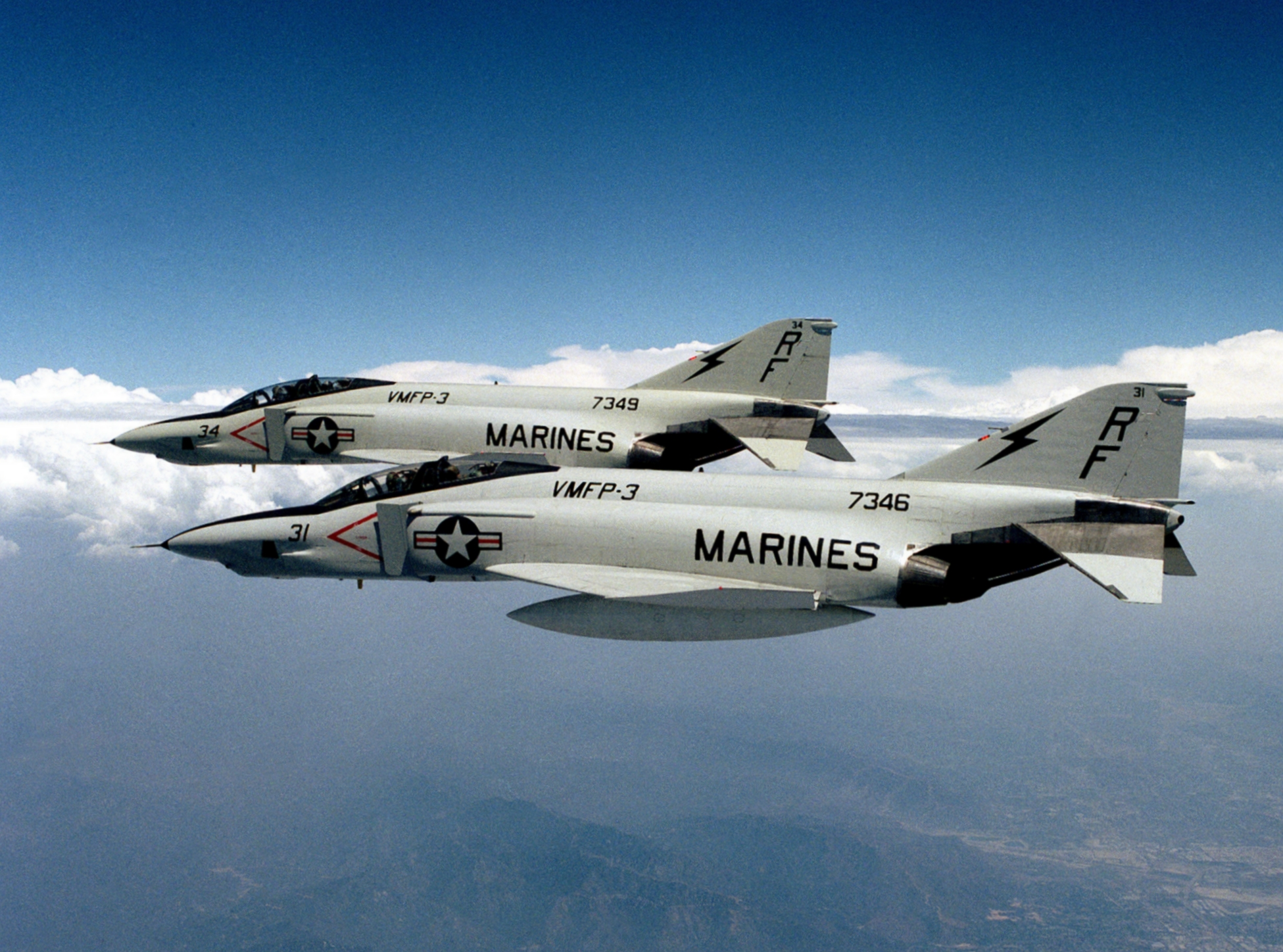
Two RF-4B Phantoms in flight

In 1990, Marine tactical reconnaissance was taken over by the Advanced Tactical Airborne Reconnaissance System, carried by McDonnell Douglas F/A-18D Hornet aircraft of Marine fighter attack squadrons (VMFA). Consequently, all RF-4Bs were retired and VMFP-3 was disbanded.

== Gallery ==
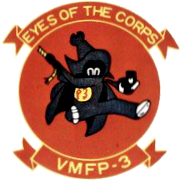
Secondary insignia utilized by the squadron in the 1970s

== See also ==
- United States Marine Corps Aviation
- List of decommissioned United States Marine Corps aircraft squadrons
