= Second VA-135 (U.S. Navy) =

Attack Squadron 135
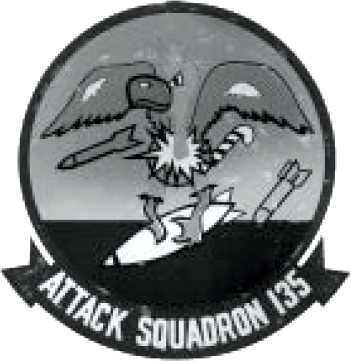
- Active: 21 August 1961 – 1 October 1962
- Country: United States
- Branch: United States Navy
- Type: Attack
- Nickname(s): Thunderbirds

Aircraft flown
- Attack: AD-6 Skyraider

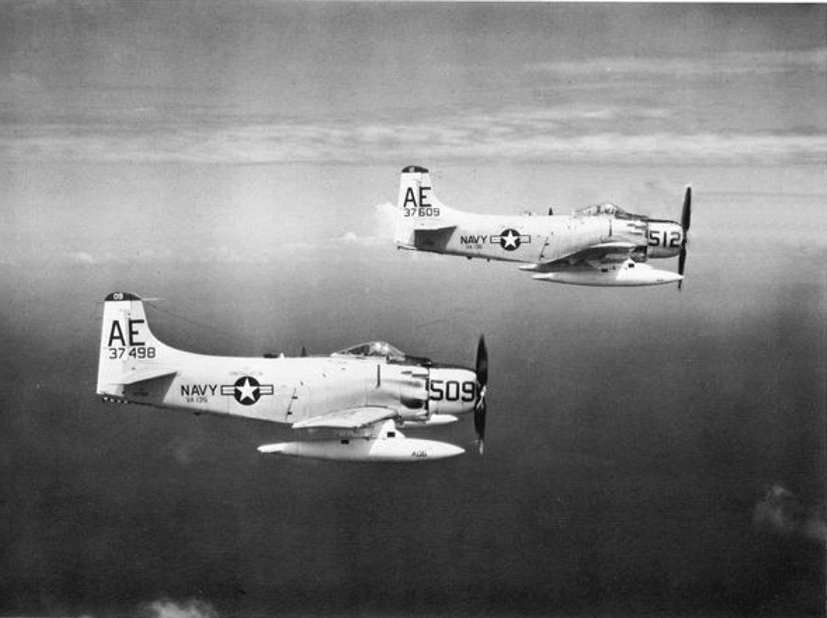
AD-6 Skyraiders of VA-135.

Attack Squadron 135 or VA-135 was a short-lived Attack Squadron of the United States Navy, nicknamed the Thunderbirds. It was established on 21 August 1961 and disestablished a year later, on 1 October 1962. It was based at NAS Jacksonville, and for a short time in 1962 at NAS Cecil Field. The squadron flew the AD-6 Skyraider aircraft. It was the second squadron to be designated as VA-135, the first VA-135 was disestablished on 30 September 1949.

== Operational history ==
- August 1961: The squadron was established as part of a new Air Group to increase the strength of the fleet during the Berlin Crisis of 1961.
- March–May 1962: The squadron participated in USS Constellation's shakedown cruise in the Caribbean.

== See also ==
- List of inactive United States Navy aircraft squadrons
- History of the United States Navy
