= VA-135 (U.S. Navy) =

Attack Squadron 135
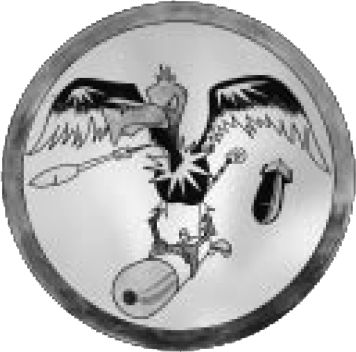
- Active: 1 March 1944 - 30 November 1949
- Country: United States
- Branch: United States Navy
- Type: Attack
- Nickname: Uninvited
- Engagements: World War II

Aircraft flown
- Attack: TBF/M Avenger; AD-4 Skyraider

VA-135 was an Attack Squadron of the U.S. Navy, nicknamed Uninvited. It was established as Torpedo Squadron VT-81 on 1 March 1944, redesignated VA-14A on 15 November 1946, and finally designated VA-135 on 2 August 1948. The squadron was disestablished on 30 November 1949. A second squadron bore the VA-135 designation in 1961-1962; the squadrons were not related.

== Operational history ==
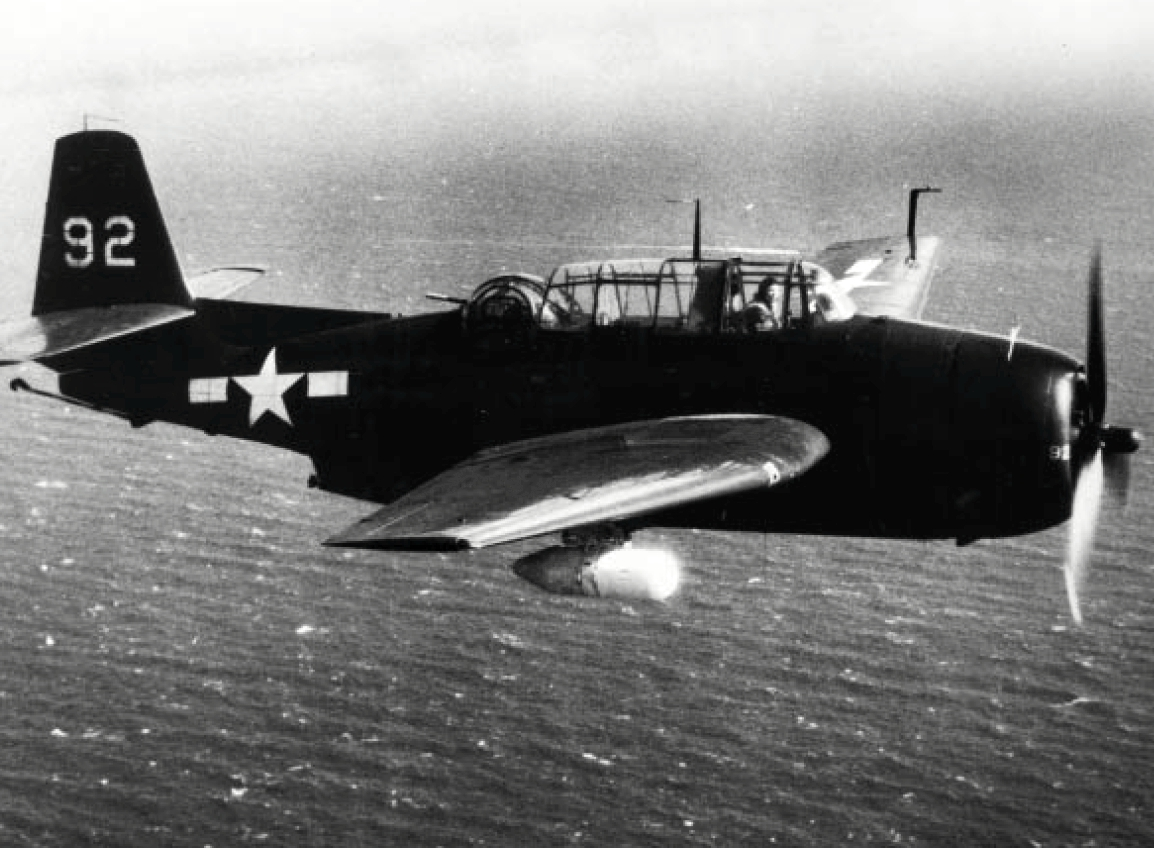
TBM-3E Avenger of VT-81 in March 1946.

- 14 November 1944: The squadron’s first combat strike was conducted against Manila Harbor.
- 9–20 January 1945: The squadron was part of a task force that entered the South China Sea and conducted combat operations against Cam Ranh Bay; Hong Kong and Takao Harbor, Formosa.
- 16 February 1945: The squadron struck the home islands of Japan, flying a seven-plane attack against Hamamatuo Airfield on Honshu.
- 21 February 1945: The squadron participated in its first ground support mission, flying sorties over Iwo Jima.
- 1 March 1945: The squadron flew its last combat strike of the war. During the four months of combat operations from USS Wasp it did not lose any personnel due to enemy action (two personnel were lost due to operational accidents).
- 15–29 June 1946: The squadron embarked on USS Princeton and transited from Norfolk to San Diego via the Panama Canal.

== Home port assignments ==
The squadron was assigned to these home ports, effective on the dates shown:

- Naval Air Station Quonset Point – 01 March 1944
- Naval Auxiliary Air Facility Martha's Vineyard – 01 March 1944*
- Naval Auxiliary Air Facility Boca Chica – 20 April 1944*
- Naval Auxiliary Air Facility Otis – 10 May 1944*
- Naval Air Station San Diego – 10 August 1944*
- Naval Air Station Puʻunene – 01 September 1944*
- Naval Air Station Pasco – 13 May 1945*
- Naval Auxiliary Air Facility Sanford – 31 July 1945*
- Naval Air Station Quonset Point – 15 September 1945
- Naval Air Station San Diego – June 1946
- Naval Air Station Jacksonville – 01 April 1949

* Temporary shore assignment while the squadron conducted training in preparation for combat deployment.

== Aircraft assignment ==
The squadron first received the following aircraft on the dates shown:

- TBF-1C Avenger – Mar 1944
- TBM-1 Avenger – Mar 1944
- TBF-1 Avenger – Mar 1944
- TBF-1C Avenger – Nov 1944
- TBM-1D Avenger – Nov 1944
- TBM-3 Avenger – May 1945
- TBM-3E Avenger – May 1945
- TBM-3Q Avenger – 1946
- AD-4 Skyraider – Sep 1949

== See also ==
- List of squadrons in the Dictionary of American Naval Aviation Squadrons
- Second VA-135 (U.S. Navy)
- Attack aircraft
- List of inactive United States Navy aircraft squadrons
- History of the United States Navy
