= VMCJ-1 =

Marine Composite Reconnaissance Squadron 1
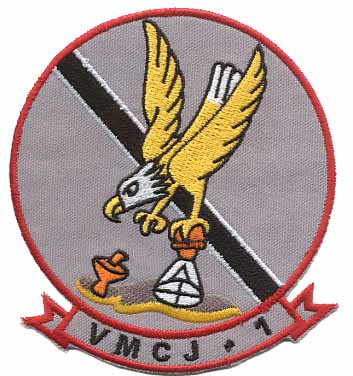
- VMCJ-1 insignia
- Active: 31 Jul 1958 - 1 Sep 1975
- Country: United States of America
- Branch: United States Marine Corps
- Role: Reconnaissance
- Part of: Inactive
- Tail Code: RM
- Engagements: Korean War; Vietnam War

Aircraft flown
- Attack: AD-2Q Skyraider
- Fighter: F4U-5P Corsair; F2H-P Banshees; F7F-2P Tigercats; F9F-2P Panther; F3D-2Q Skyknight; F8U-1P Crusader

Marine Composite Reconnaissance Squadron 1 (VMCJ-1) was an aviation squadron of the United States Marine Corps that provided aerial photographic reconnaissance and electronic countermeasures is support of the Fleet Marine Force. The squadron was formed in 1958 with the merger of Marine Composite Squadron 1 (VMC-1) and Marine Photo Reconnaissance 1 (VMJ-1). The squadron's support to the Vietnam War began in 1964 flying off Yankee Station and ended with sorties in support of Operation Frequent Wind during the fall of Saigon. VMCJ-1 was decommissioned in 1975 as the Marine Corps further consolidated its aerial photo reconnaissance assets after the Vietnam War.

== VMJ-1 History ==
Marine Photo Reconnaissance Squadron 1 (VMJ-1) was commissioned on 25 February 1952, at K-3 airfield near Pohang, Korea. The formation of the squadron brought together all of the photo reconnaissance assets that had been operating under the 1st Marine Aircraft Wing's Headquarters squadron (1stMAW HEDRON) and Marine Aircraft Group 33's Headquarters Squadron since the beginning of the Korean War in July 1950. The squadron's initial complement of eleven aircraft consisted of five F2H-P Banshees, four F7F-2P Tigercats, one F9F-2P Panther and one F4U-5P Corsair. At the time of its commissioning, VMJ-1 also had the highest number of enlisted pilots in the Marine Corps.

Following the war in 1954 the squadron moved to Naval Air Station Atsugi. In 1955 they were tasked by the commander of United States Seventh Fleet to provide aerial reconnaissance over Fujian Province, Republic of China to determine if the People's Liberation Army were building up forces for a possible invasion of Taiwan.

== VMC-1 History ==
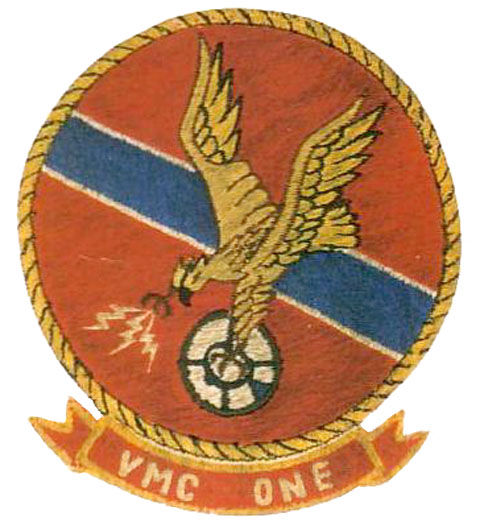
VMC-1 insignia

Marine Composite Squadron 1 was formed on 15 September 1952, at K-3 Pohang. It was the first Marine Corps squadron with the mission of Airborne early warning and control (AEW) and employing electronic countermeasures (ECM) as part of electronic warfare (EW). At the time of their formation the squadron only had one aircraft, a AD-2Q Skyraider with an AN/APA-17 Direction finder. Early challenges for the squadron included fielding various models of the Skyraider and not having a training pipeline for the ECM operators. The squadron flew their first combat mission on 18 September 1952, but flew very sparingly in their first few months due to lack of airframes and trained crew. By the end of the war the squadron consisted of 29 officer and 167 enlisted. They remained in Korea after the war and eventually moved to Marine Corps Air Station Kaneohe Bay, Hawaii in 1955 leaving their old aircraft in Japan along the way. In Hawaii they picked up AD-5Ns and AD-5Ws with the Guppy Radar. During their time in Hawaii the squadron lost three aircraft during training with the loss of four Marines. In July 1958 they moved to Marine Corps Air Station El Toro, California in preparation for their merge with VMJ-1.

== VMCJ-1 History ==
VMCJ-1 was commissioned on 31 July 1958, at Marine Corps Air Station El Toro. This newly formed squadron was the result of a merger between VMJ-1 and VMC-1. It was the last of the VMCJs to commission and the squadron initially flew the F8U-1P, an unarmed reconnaissance variant of the Vought F-8 Crusader and the F3D-2Q, an electronic warfare version of the Douglas F3D Skyknight. The squadron departed the United States in November 1959 as part of the Unit Deployment Program. It relieved VMCJ-3 at Marine Corps Air Station Iwakuni, Japan while also taking control of VMCJ-3's EF-10Bs. From November 1959 through April 1965, VMCJ-1 flew Sharkfin Electronic Reconnaissance Missions in support of the Peacetime Aerial Reconnaissance Program while also supporting Marine Corps training throughout the Pacific.

Beginning in 1964, the squadron began supporting Task Force 77 deployments to Yankee Station in the Gulf of Tonkin augmenting the Navy's photoreconnaissance squadrons. That year, the squadron also had one third of its pilots recommended for Distinguished Flying Crosses by the Navy for flying photo flights over Cuba and was awarded the Commandant's Aviation Efficiency Trophy for outstanding accomplishment of all assigned tasks.

=== Vietnam War ===
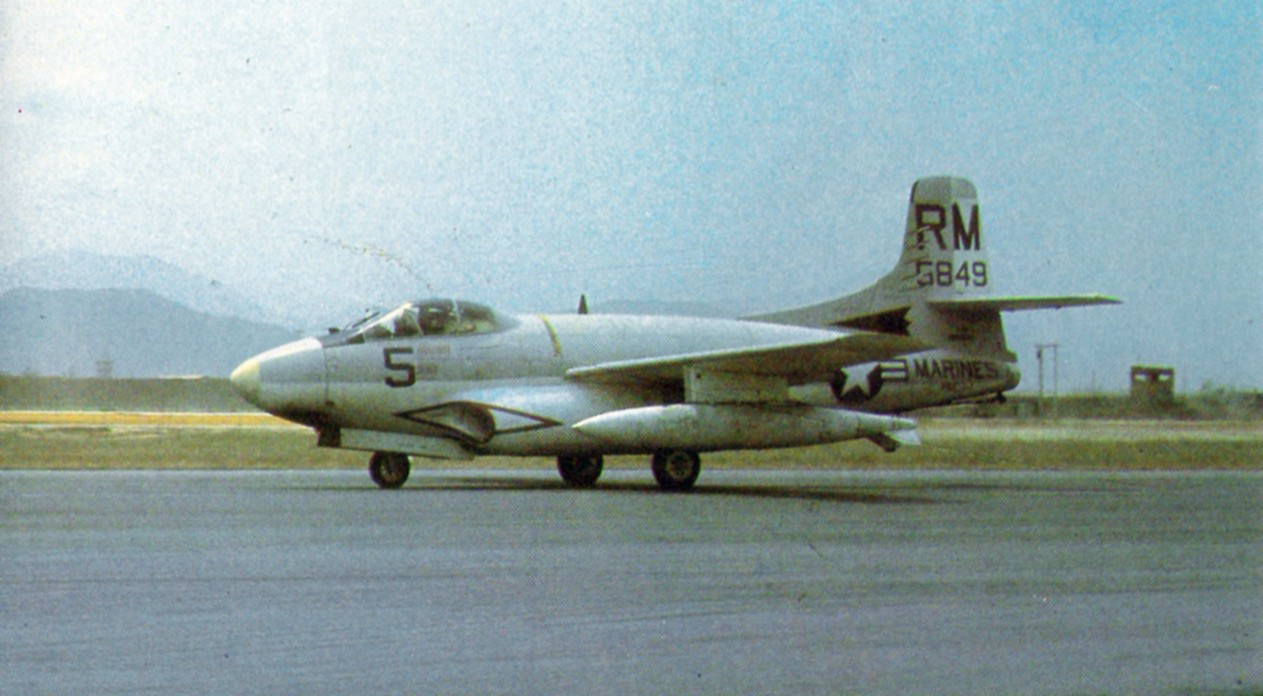
EF-10B Skyknight of VMCJ-1

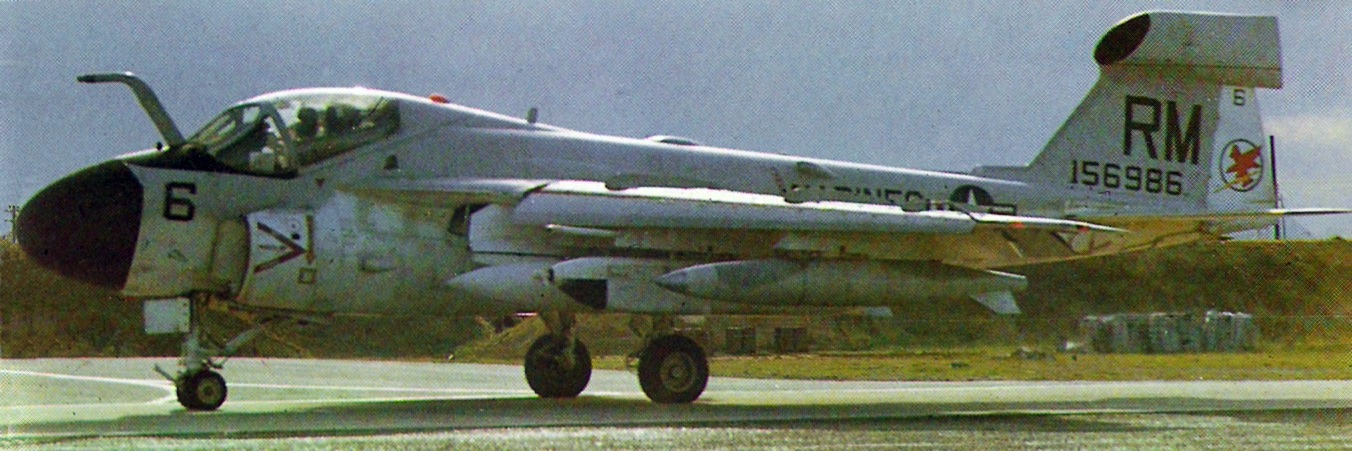
A VMCJ-1 Grumman EA-6A Intruder ECM-aircraft (BuNo 156986) at Da Nang, South Vietnam in June 1970.

VMCJ-1 was one of the first Marine Corps squadrons into South Vietnam in April 1965. The squadron provided Electronic countermeasure support for United States Air Force and United States Navy aircraft conducting missions over North Vietnam. The first VMCJ-1 aircraft lost in combat occurred on 13 August 1965, when an RF-8A from the Yankee Team detachment flying from the USS Coral Sea, was critically damaged by anti-aircraft artillery while photographing a North Vietnamese Navy radar installation. The pilot was able to eject out to sea. The squadron would depart Da Nang Air Base on 15 July 1970, after five years of combat in Vietnam having flown over 25,000 sorties with four different aircraft types (EF-10B, RF-8A, EA-6A, RF-4B), the last 11,297 hours accident free. In addition, over 1000 RF-8A sorties were flown during 1964-65 from Task Force 77 aircraft carriers in the Gulf of Tonkin.

On 3 April 1972, after the launch of the Easter Offensive by the Vietnam People's Army VMCJ-1 was ordered by the commanding general of the 1st Marine Aircraft Wing to deploy to Naval Air Station Cubi Point in the Philippines to support Task Force 77 operations as part of President Nixon's response codenamed Operation Freedom Train. The squadron flew their first combat missions on 7 April and remained at NAS Cubi Point for an extended period flying in support of Operation Linebacker.

=== Post-Vietnam and deactivation ===
Upon leaving Vietnam, the squadron moved to Marine Corps Air Station Iwakuni falling under the command of Marine Aircraft Group 12 (MAG-12). In February 1971, VMCJ-1 was sent to Sydney, Australia to support Fleet Anti-Air-Warfare Exercise. This was the first USMC squadron deployment to Australia since World War II. Following the exercises in Taiwan and Australia the squadron was transferred to the control of Marine Aircraft Group 15 (MAG-15) on 1 July 1971.

In April 1972 the squadron's EA-6As were deployed to Naval Air Station Cubi Point in the Philippines to support Task Force 77 in Operations Linebacker I and II against heavily defended targets around Hanoi and Haiphong. Later augmented by a four plane detachment from VMCJ-2, these detachments flew 2,496 sorties covering 5,356 hours while losing one EA-6A to enemy action. The squadron's aircraft returned to MCAS Iwakuni in January 1973. In October 1973 the EA-6As began supporting operations from on the USS Midway (CV-41). Aircraft detailed to this support were called "Detachment 101." In April 1975, a three-plane detachment from the squadron, flying from the USS Coral Sea (CV-43), flew cover during Operation Frequent Wind, the evacuation of Saigon. As the only fixed wing squadron supporting the fall of Saigon it flew the last EA-6A mission over Vietnam on 30 April 1975.

Immediately after the end of the Vietnam War, the Marine Corps consolidated its photo reconnaissance assets in to two units - VMFP-3 at MCAS El Toro and VMAQ-2 at MCAS Cherry Point. VMCJ-1 was officially decommissioned on 2 September 1975.

== Squadron accidents ==
- October 22, 1973 - U.S. Navy Carrier Air Wing Five suffers six fatalities in night operations this date when Ling-Temco-Vought A-7A-4b-CV Corsair II BuNo 153204, 'NF-412', of VA-56, flown by Lt (jg) Everett E. Goodrow, and Grumman EA-6A Prowler, BuNo 156980, c/n I-449, 'RM-611', of USMC VMCJ-1 Detachment 101, crewed by 1st Lts. Jot Eve and David L. Moody, fly into the sea 127 miles (204 km) east of Okinawa 11 miles (18 km) aft of USS Midway during CVW-5's initial night qualification period. "Attempting to undertake a no-radio, no navigational aids (NORDO/NONAV) approach in bad weather, the crew found themselves struggling to find 'the boat'. On hearing their radio transmissions, Lt (jg) Goodrow found the EA-6A and had the jet form up on his wing for the approach back to the ship. They shot a teardrop pattern directly over the carrier and had turned inbound to the vessel on its course when both simultaneously disappeared from radar screens. None of the aircrew attempted to eject and there were no radio transmissions made from either jet. It was subsequently assumed that both pilots had flown into the water or collided and then hit the water at about the time they would have slowed to extend their flaps, slats, and landing gear." Subsequently, in a search attempt, an H-3 'Angel', Sikorsky SH-3G Sea King, BuNo 149893, launches forward of the island, contrary to NATOPS standards, as there was no point of reference in the dark, and at high power flies straight into the water. Three of four crewmen, Lt (jg)s William J. Bates and George A. Wildridge and ADJ1 Richard H. Hall, are lost. This was the last USMC EA-6A loss.

== Unit awards ==
A unit citation or commendation is an award bestowed upon an organization for the action cited. Members of the unit who participated in said actions are allowed to wear on their uniforms the awarded unit citation. VMCJ-1 was presented with the following awards:

Streamer	Award	Year(s)	Additional Info
	Presidential Unit Citation Streamer (Navy)	1965-1967	Vietnam
	Navy Unit Commendation Streamer w/ two Bronze Stars	17 Apr-1 Nov 1965, 18- 23Aug 1965	Vietnam
	Meritorious Unit Commendation Streamer with two Bronze Stars	1967, 1968, 1973	Vietnam
	National Defense Service Streamer w one Bronze Star	1961–1974	Vietnam War
	Korean Service Streamer with two Bronze Stars		Korea
	Vietnam Service Streamer w two Silver and three Bronze Stars	1965-1973	
	Vietnam Gallantry Cross with Palm Streamer	1965–1971	
	Vietnam Meritorious Unit Citation Civil Actions Streamer	1965–1971	

== See also ==
- United States Marine Corps Aviation
- List of decommissioned United States Marine Corps aircraft squadrons
