= VA-104 (U.S. Navy) =

Attack Squadron 104
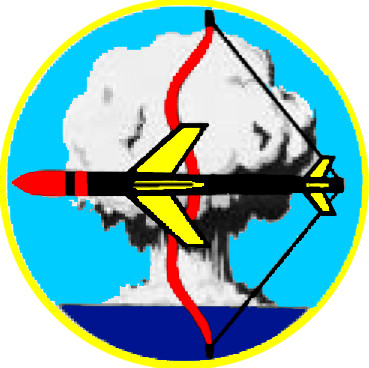
- VA-104 squadron insignia
- Active: 1 May 1952 – 31 March 1959
- Country: United States
- Branch: United States Navy
- Role: Attack
- Part of: Inactive
- Nickname: Hell's Archers

Aircraft flown
- Attack: FG-1D/F4U-5 Corsair; AD-6 Skyraider

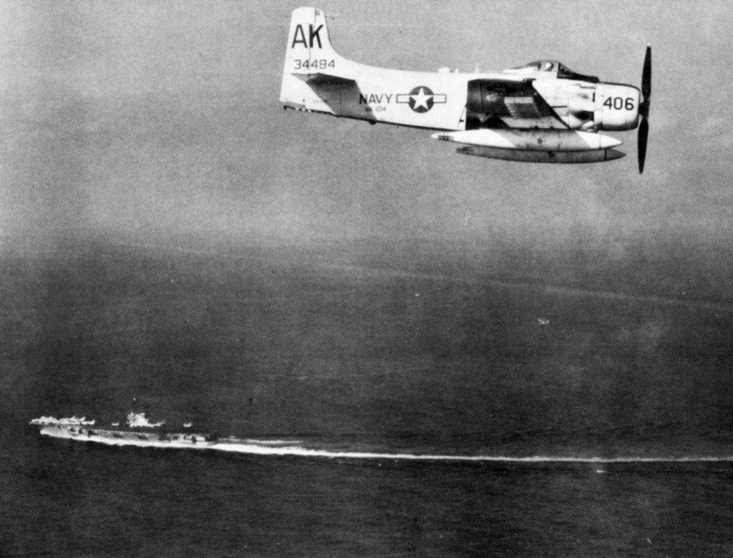
VA-104 AD-6 in flight above USS Forrestal, visible below, in 1958

VA-104 was an Attack Squadron of the United States Navy. It was established as Fighter Squadron VF-104 on 1 May 1952, and redesignated VA-104 in December 1953. The squadron was disestablished on 31 March 1959. Its nickname was Hell's Archers.

== Significant events ==
- Nov 1956: During the Suez War the squadron operated from USS Coral Sea (CVA-43) off the coast of Egypt. It provided air support for the evacuation of Americans and foreign nationals from that country.
- Jul 1958: The squadron operated from USS Forrestal (CVA-59) in the eastern Atlantic, ready to enter the Mediterranean if needed for the United States Marines’ landing in Beirut, Lebanon.

== Home port assignments ==
The squadron was assigned to these home ports, effective on the dates shown:

- NAS Cecil Field – 1 May 1952
- NAS Jacksonville – Apr 1953
- NAS Cecil Field – Dec 1953
- NAS Jacksonville – Feb 1957

== Aircraft assignment ==
The squadron first received the following aircraft on the dates shown:

- FG-1D Corsair – May 1952
- F4U-5 Corsair – Dec 1952
- AD-6 Skyraider – 6 Jan 1954

== See also ==
- Attack aircraft
- List of inactive United States Navy aircraft squadrons
- History of the United States Navy
