= VFAW-4 =

Defunct United States Navy fighter squadron

All-Weather Fighter Squadron 4
- Active: 1948-1956 as VC-4; 1956-1959 as VF(AW)-4
- Country: United States
- Branch: United States Navy
- Type: All-weather fighter squadron, composite squadron (formerly)
- Role: Night fighter, all-weather fighter, antisubmarine warfare, various other roles
- Garrison/HQ: NAS Atlantic City (1948-1958); NAS Quonset Point (1958-1959)
- Nickname: Nightcappers
- Motto: Nox mea auxiliatrix est (Note: This is in Latin, translating approximately to "The night is my ally" in English.)
- Engagements: Korean War; Cold War

All-Weather Fighter Squadron 4 (VF(AW)-4), nicknamed the Nightcappers, was a carrier-based multipurpose squadron of the United States Navy. Established in 1948 as Composite Squadron 4 (VC-4), it saw extensive action during the Korean War piloting Vought F4U Corsair night fighters and was, at one point, the largest operational squadron in the U.S. Navy. Redesignated as All-Weather Fighter Squadron 4 in 1956, it was disbanded in 1959.

== History ==
=== As Composite Squadron 4 ===
Established in 1948, Composite Squadron 4 along with its West Coast-based sister squadron Composite Squadron 3 inherited the Navy's experiment with night aircraft carrier operations during World War II. After the start of the Korean War in 1950, detachments of VC-4 were deployed thrice to assist in combat operations: From 1950 to 1951 aboard the USS Leyte, from 1952 to 1953 aboard the USS Bon Homme Richard, and again in 1953 aboard the USS Lake Champlain. During these deployments, the squadron famously operated F4U-5N radar-equipped night fighters, among other aircraft. They flew in all-weather and nighttime fighter and attack missions, during which over forty members of the squadron were killed in action. By the end of 1954, VC-4 had become the largest operational squadron in the United States Navy, with 120 officers and over one thousand enlisted men in the unit. In the following years, the squadron provided fighter detachments to antisubmarine hunter-killer carrier groups in the Atlantic Ocean.

=== As All-Weather Fighter Squadron 4 ===
In 1956, Composite Squadron 4 was redesignated as All-Weather Fighter Squadron 4, and was well under way in transitioning to an all-weather jet fighter squadron. However, after a jet accident in 1958 and a subsequent reassessment by Naval Air Force Atlantic, it was ruled that jets were not safe to launch from Essex-class antisubmarine warfare carrier flight decks. This was the death knell of VF(AW)-4, and it was disestablished shortly thereafter in 1959.

== Legacy ==
In May 1994, the Association of the Composite Squadron Four Nightcappers erected a granite monument bearing the names of the VC-4 aviators killed in action during the Korean War. Located at the 177th Fighter Wing headquarters in Atlantic City, New Jersey, the site was once Naval Air Station Atlantic City, home of the Nightcappers. In 2016, the monument was restored and refurbished.

== Aircraft ==
The following aircraft models were used by VC-4/VF(AW)-4 during its entire operational history.

- Grumman F6F
- General Motors TBM
- Douglas AD
- Vought F4U
- Beechcraft JRB
- North American SNJ
- Martin AM
- Grumman F8F
- McDonnell F2H
- Douglas F3D
- Grumman F9F
- Lockheed TV-2

== See also ==
- History of the United States Navy
- List of inactive United States Navy aircraft squadrons
- List of United States Navy aircraft squadrons
