= VA-194 (U.S. Navy) =

Attack Squadron 194
- Active: 15 August 1943 - 1 December 1949
- Country: United States
- Branch: United States Navy
- Type: Attack
- Engagements: World War II

Aircraft flown
- Attack: SBD Dauntless; SB2 Helldiver; AD Skyraider

VA-194 was an Attack Squadron of the U.S. Navy. It was established as Bombing Squadron VB-19 on 15 August 1943. It was redesignated as VA-19A on 15 November 1946, and as VA-194 on 24 August 1948. The squadron was disestablished on 1 December 1949. Its nickname is unknown.

== Operational history ==
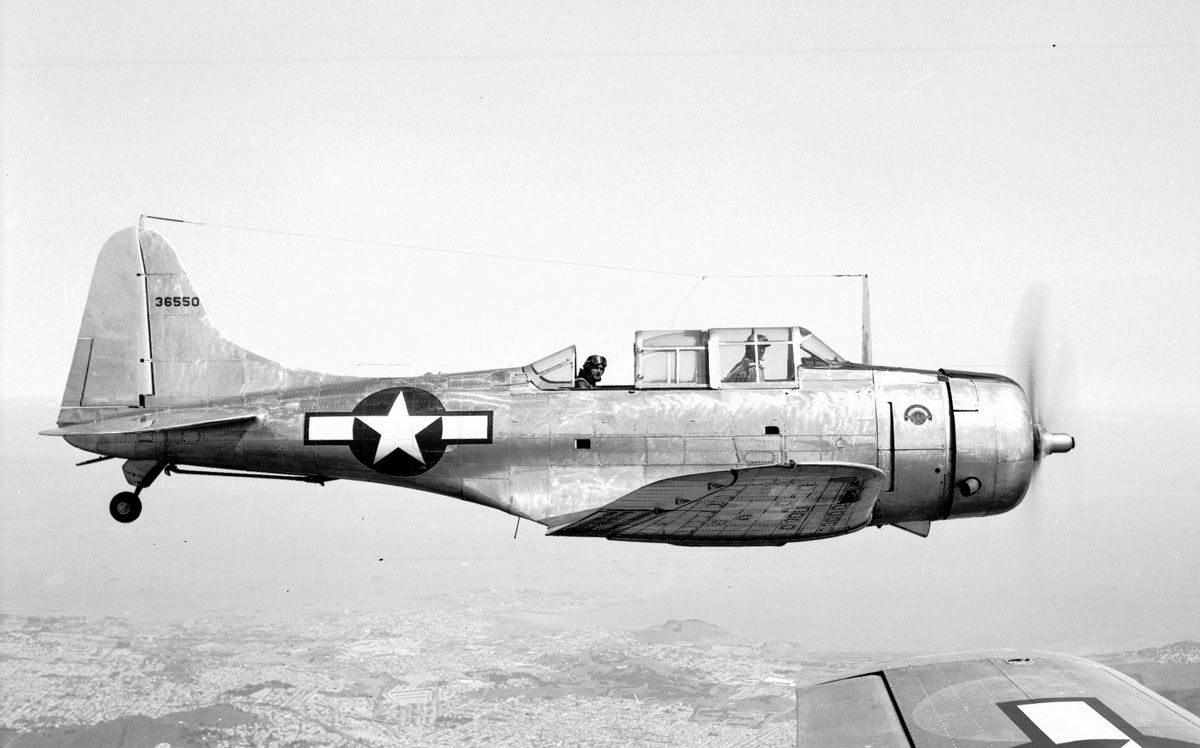
SBD-5 Dauntless similar to those flown by VB-19

- 18–21 July 1944: The squadron's first combat sorties involved preinvasion strikes for the Battle of Guam. It also provided support for the initial landings on the island.
- July–October 1944: Squadron aircraft flew sorties against targets on Palau, Bonin Islands, the Philippines, including Mindanao and Luzon, Okinawa, Formosa and the Pescadores.
- 24 October 1944: Squadron aircraft participated in several major engagements during the Battle for Leyte Gulf. VB-19 aircraft flew search missions from north of Lingayen Gulf to the northern tip of Mindoro to locate the Japanese Task Force. It struck the Japanese Central Force in the Sibuyan Sea, which included the Japanese battleship Musashi. However, only limited damage was caused by the squadron's attack since its aircraft were armed only with general-purpose bombs instead of armor-piercing bombs. For his actions during this engagement Lieutenant Leonard R. Swanson was awarded the Navy Cross and Lieutenant (jg)s Stuart E. Crapser and Herbert N. Walters were awarded Silver Stars.
- 24 October 1944: The squadron's commanding officer, Commander R. S. McGowan, failed to return from a combat mission and was declared missing in action.
- 25 October 1944: The squadron participated in coordinated attacks against the Japanese Carrier Task Force in the Battle off Cape Engaño. VB-19 aircraft claimed they either sunk or assisted in the sinking of three Japanese carriers. Four Japanese carriers were sunk during the battle. Thirty-two squadron pilots were awarded the Navy Cross for their actions in this battle. They were: Lieutenants William S. Emerson, Price R. Stradley, Robert D. Niemeyer, John B. Gunter, William E. McBride, Emil B. Stella, Jack Meeker, John L. Butts, Jr., Donald F. Helm, Norman E. Thurmon, Donald F. Banker, Robert B. Parker, Joe W. Williams, Jr., William A. Wright and Raymond G. Wicklander; Lieutenant (jg)s George H. Bowen, Melvin L. Chapman, Robert E. Lee Duncan, Jr., Donald D. Engen, Arnost Jancar, Jerry B. Wilton, Webster P. Wodell, Daniel Sadler, Jr., Louis A. Heilmann, George W. Peck, Jack Scott, Stuart E. Crapser, John H. Crocker, William T. Good and Robert G. Smith; and Ensigns Leon F. Kinard, Robert W. Doyle and William H. Wagner, Jr. Two squadron personnel were awarded the Silver Star for their actions; they were: Lieutenants Donald F. Banker and Leonard R. Swanson.
- 5–6 November 1944: The squadron's final sorties involved attacks on Manila Bay and the successful sinking of a Japanese Heavy Cruiser on 5 November. For their actions in the sinking of the cruiser, Lieutenants Donald F. Banker and Price R. Stradley were awarded Gold Stars in lieu of their second Navy Cross. 26 Nov–14 Dec 1944: The squadron and air group were relieved by CVG-20 and were en route from Ulithi Atoll, via the Hawaiian Islands, to the States.

== Home port assignments ==
The squadron was assigned to these home ports, effective on the dates shown:

- NAAS Los Alamitos – 15 Aug 1943
- NAS Kahului – 29 Feb 1944*
- NAS Alameda – 20 Jan 1945*
- NAAS Santa Rosa – 06 Feb 1945*
- NAS Kahului – 09 Aug 1945
- NAS Barbers Point – 04 Nov 1945
- NAB Marpi Point and NAB Kobler, Saipan 01 Apr 1946**
- NAS Alameda – 19 Aug 1946

* Temporary shore assignment while the squadron conducted training in preparation for combat deployment.
** Temporary shore assignment while the squadron was deployed to WestPac.

== Aircraft assignment ==
The squadron first received the following aircraft on the dates shown:

- SBD-5 Dauntless – Sep 1943
- SB2C-1 Helldiver – 01 Apr 1944
- SB2C-1C Helldiver – May 1944
- SB2C-3 Helldiver – Jun 1944
- SB2C-4 Helldiver – Feb 1945
- SB2C-4E Helldiver – Feb 1945
- SB2C-5 Helldiver – Aug 1945
- AD-1 Skyraider – 06 Dec 1946
- AD-2 Skyraider – Sep 1948
- AD-3 Skyraider – 10 Jan 1949

== See also ==
- List of squadrons in the Dictionary of American Naval Aviation Squadrons
- Attack aircraft
- List of inactive United States Navy aircraft squadrons
- History of the United States Navy
