= Third VA-95 (U.S. Navy) =

Attack Squadron 95
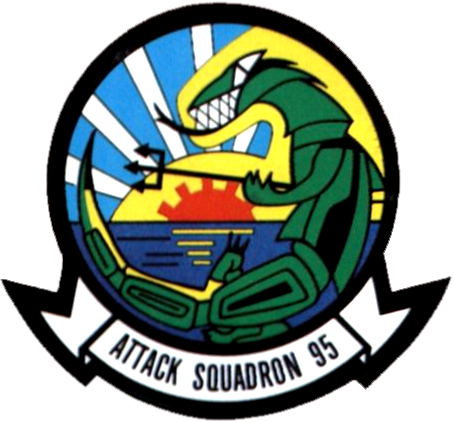
- Active: 1 April 1972 - 31 October 1995
- Country: United States
- Branch: United States Navy
- Type: Attack
- Nickname: Green Lizards
- Engagements: Vietnam War; Operation Praying Mantis; Operation Classic Resolve; Operation Continue Hope; Operation Southern Watch

Aircraft flown
- Attack: A-6/KA-6 Intruder

The third VA-95 established April 1, 1972 and reclaiming the original "Green Lizards" name, the first VA-95 being established in 1943, as an Attack Squadron of the U.S. Navy. The second squadron was established on 1 April 1950, renamed the "Skyknights",. The unit returned to the name "Green Lizards" and was disestablished on 31 October 1995.

== History ==
=== 1970s ===
In April 1973, the squadron provided support for Operation End Sweep, the clearing of mine fields along the coast of North Vietnam.

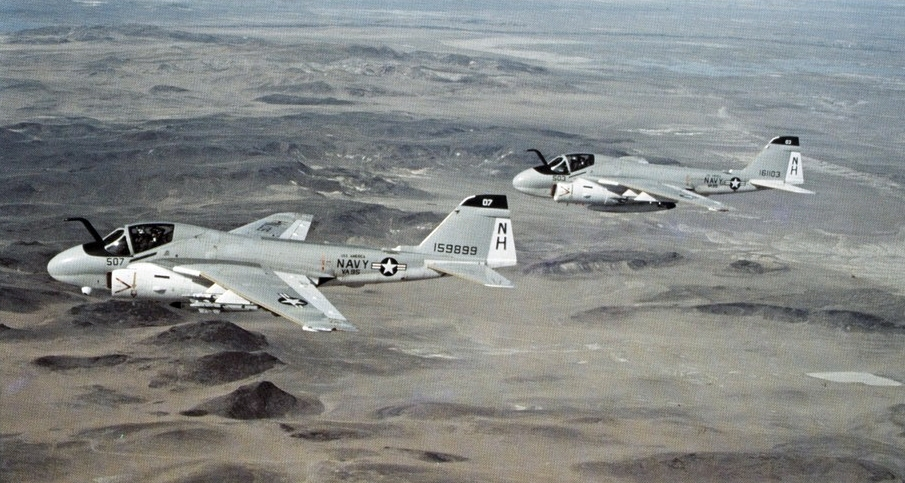
Two A-6E TRAM Intruders assigned to VA-95 in 1981.

Aircraft from VA-95 would participate in Operation Frequent Wind, the evacuation of American personnel from Saigon. The squadron provided armed escort flights over the Saigon area for protection of the helicopters conducting the evacuation.

On 15 May 1975, The squadron participated in the recovery of the American merchant ship SS Mayaguez following its capture by Cambodian gunboats. The squadron flew sorties in support of the Marine landings on Koh Tang Island and retaliatory strikes against Cambodian targets. Squadron aircraft struck the airfield and naval facility at Ream, Cambodia. The squadron's KA-6D aircraft were used to provide tanker support for the combat sorties.

=== 1980s ===
Between 18 and 19 April 1988, Flying off the USS Enterprise (CVN-65), the squadron participated in Operation Praying Mantis, retaliatory strikes against Iran after USS Samuel B. Roberts struck an Iranian mine in international waters. Squadron aircraft attacked Iranian Boghammar speedboats, using Rockeye cluster bombs. They sunk one and damaged another.

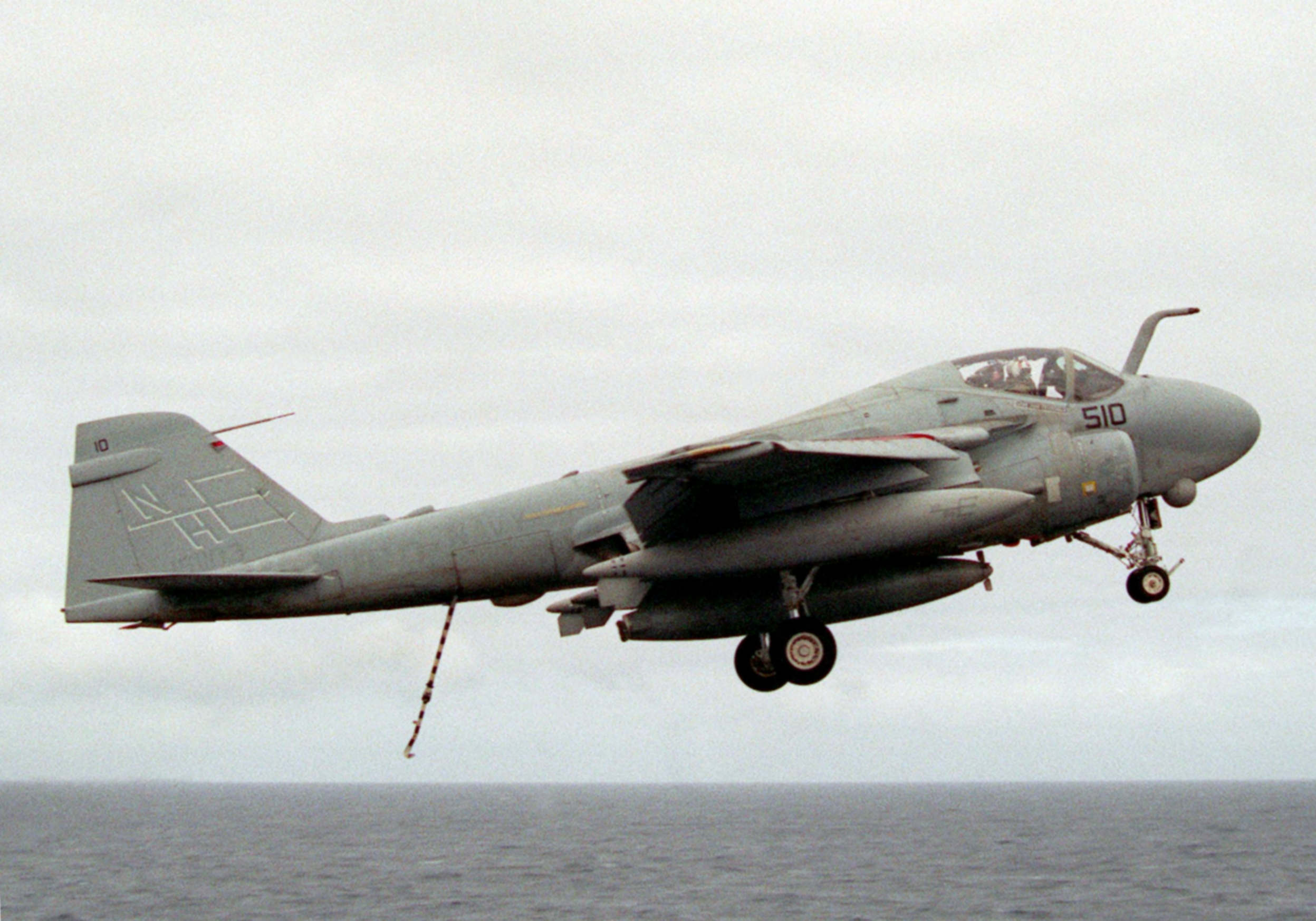
An A-6E TRAM Intruder from VA-95 taking off from the USS Abraham Lincoln CVN-72 in 1990.

Later in the day, the Iranian frigate Sahand fired missiles at two of the squadron's aircraft while they were flying a surface combat air patrol for USS Joseph Strauss. The aircraft evaded the missiles and returned fire with two AGM-84 Harpoons and four laser-guided Skipper bombs. This attack was followed by a Harpoon firing from Joseph Strauss. The attack against the Sahand left her blazing. Eventually the fires reached her magazines, and the final explosions lead to her sinking.

Following this action the sister ship of the Sahand, the Sabalan, left port and engaged several of the squadron's aircraft, firing a missile at them. One of the squadron's A-6s responded with a laser-guided bomb that hit Sabalan, and she went dead in the water. The Sabalan was taken in tow by an Iranian tug, her fantail partially submerged. VA-95's aircraft were ordered not to continue the attack. The squadron continued to fly combat sorties during 19 April but no other action resulted.

In December 1989, the squadron participated in Operation Classic Resolve on the Enterprise, providing support for the Philippine government during a coup attempt.

=== 1990s ===
In October–November 1990, during the USS Abraham Lincoln's cruise from the East to West Coast via Cape Horn, the squadron participated in joint exercises with the Argentinean, Chilean, and Ecuadorian Armed Forces. During their 1993 with the Lincoln, the squadron participated in Operation Southern Watch in Iraq and Continue Hope in Somalia.

== Home port assignments ==
The squadron was assigned NAS Whidbey Island.

== Aircraft assignment ==
The squadron first received the following aircraft on the dates shown:

- A-6A Intruder – 1972
- A-6B Intruder – 1972
- KA-6D Intruder – 1972
- A-6E Intruder – 4 February 1976
- A-6E SWIP Intruder – 1993

== See also ==
- VA-95 (U.S. Navy)
- Second VA-95 (U.S. Navy)
- Attack aircraft
- List of inactive United States Navy aircraft squadrons
- History of the United States Navy
