= Attack Squadron 174 =

Attack Squadron 174 can refer to

- VA-174 (U.S. Navy)
- VA-174 (U.S. Navy, 1966-1988)
