= VA-114 (U.S. Navy) =

Attack Squadron 114
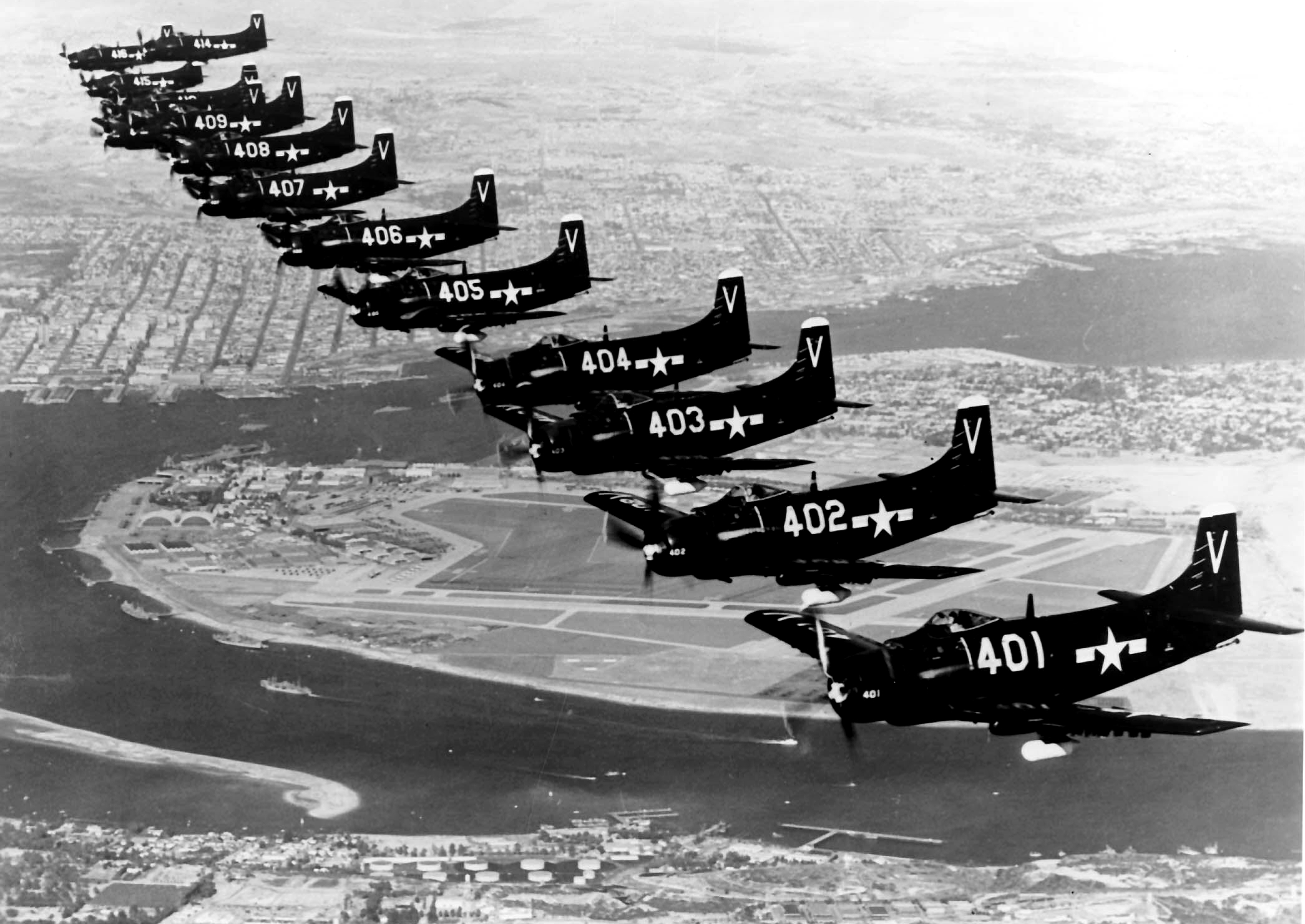
- Fourteen VA-114 AD-2s over Naval Air Station North Island in 1949
- Active: 10 October 1942 - 1 December 1949
- Country: United States
- Branch: United States Navy
- Type: Attack
- Nickname: Pegasus
- Engagements: World War II

Aircraft flown
- Attack: SBD Dauntless; SB2 Helldiver; AD-1/2 Skyraider; F8F-2 Bearcat

VA-114 was an Attack Squadron of the U.S. Navy. It was established as Bombing Squadron VB-11 on 10 October 1942, redesignated VA-11A on 15 November 1946, and finally as VA-114 on 15 July 1948. The squadron was disestablished on 1 December 1949. The squadron was known as the Pegasus.

== Operational history ==
- April–July 1943: The squadron was landbased at Guadalcanal and participated in the Solomon Islands campaign. Flying patrol, search and strike missions against targets primarily in and around New Georgia.
- 10 October 1944: Squadron aircraft participated in the first strikes against Okinawa, opening the Leyte campaign.
- 12 October 1944: The squadron participated in the first strikes against Formosa.
- 25 October 1944: During the Battle for Leyte Gulf, the squadron participated in the engagement known as the Battle off Samar. Launching from a range of 340 miles, which was beyond the normal combat radius for World War II carrier aircraft, 11 of the squadron's SB2Cs engaged the Japanese fleet after it broke off its engagement with the American escort carriers and destroyers guarding the landing force at Leyte. Hits were scored on a battleship and cruiser. A second strike by nine squadron aircraft later scored hits on two cruisers.
- November 1944: Squadron aircraft struck targets on Luzon in continued support for the capture of Leyte.
- December 1944: Targets were struck on Luzon in support of the landings on Mindoro.
- 18 December 1944: While operating east of the Philippines, the task force, of which the squadron was part, was overtaken by an unusually severe typhoon causing the loss of three destroyers and damage to several other ships, including four light carriers.
- January 1945: In early January, the squadron struck ships and targets on Formosa in support of the Invasion of Lingayen Gulf.
- 9–20 January 1945: The squadron participated in operations in the South China Sea, the first time an American Task Force had entered these waters since the beginning of the war. During these operations, squadron aircraft struck a large convoy of tankers; targets along the coast of Indochina reaching almost to Saigon; Formosa was hit again; and then strikes were flown against Hong Kong.
- 25 March 1948: USS Valley Forge, with VA-114 embarked, operated in the Persian Gulf with Saudi Arabian Prince Ibn Saud embarked to view air operations. The air display was cancelled because of a sand storm and hazy air conditions.
- 29 Apr 1948: Valley Forge moored port side to Dokkeskjaerkaien Dock, Bergen, Norway. The mooring was conducted without the aid of tugs, using the engine power of the squadron's eight SB2C-5s spotted on the aft deck and eight other aircraft on the forward deck. The mooring operation was called Operation Pinwheel.

== Home port assignments ==
The squadron was assigned to these home ports, effective on the dates shown:

- NAS San Diego – 10 Oct 1942
- NAS Barbers Point – 26 Nov 1942*
- NAF Nandi (in the Fiji Islands) – Feb 1943*
- NAF Guadalcanal – 26 Apr 1943
- NAS Alameda – Aug 1943
- NAS Hilo – 06 Apr 1944*
- NAS Barbers Point – 19 Jun 1944*
- NAS Alameda – Feb 1945
- NAAS Fallon – 30 Apr 1945*
- NAAS Santa Rosa – 26 Jul 1945*
- NAS Kahului, Hawaii – 21 Feb 1946
- NAS San Diego – 25 Nov 1946

* Temporary shore assignment while the squadron conducted training in preparation for combat deployment.

== Aircraft assignment ==
The squadron first received the following aircraft on the dates shown:

- SBD-3 Dauntless – Oct 1942
- SBD-4 Dauntless – Feb 1943
- SBD-5 Dauntless – Oct 1943
- SB2C-1C Helldiver – 25 Nov 1943
- SB2C-4/4E Helldiver – Apr 1945
- SB2C-5 Helldiver – Jan 1946
- AD-1 Skyraider – 31 Aug 1948
- AD-2 Skyraider – 20 Dec 1948
- F8F-2 Bearcat – Nov 1949

== See also ==
- List of squadrons in the Dictionary of American Naval Aviation Squadrons
- Attack aircraft
- List of inactive United States Navy aircraft squadrons
- History of the United States Navy
