= Second VA-95 (U.S. Navy) =

Attack Squadron 95
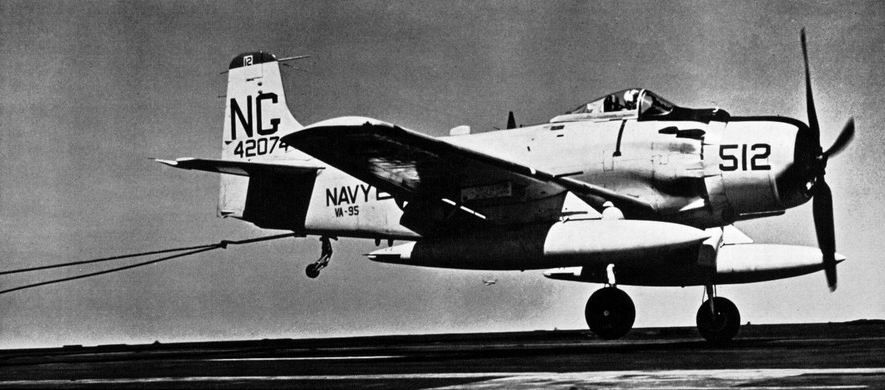
- VA-95 AD-7 Skyraider landing on USS Ranger in 1960
- Active: 26 March 1952 – 1 April 1970
- Country: United States
- Branch: United States Navy
- Type: Attack
- Engagements: Vietnam War

Aircraft flown
- Attack: F6F-5 Hellcat; AD Skyraider; A-4 Skyhawk

The second VA-95 was an Attack Squadron of the United States Navy, and was the second of three unrelated squadrons to bear that designation. It was established on 26 March 1952, and disestablished on 1 April 1970. The squadron's nickname was the Skyknights from 1957 to 1963, and the Green Lizards thereafter.

== Operational history ==
- January 1963: The squadron participated in cross deck operations with the British carrier HMS Hermes (R12) while operating in the western Pacific.
- May 1963: Following the military losses of Lao neutralists to the Pathet Lao on the Plain of Jars, Laos, USS Ranger transited to the South China Sea to support possible operations in Laos.
- November 1964 – April 1965: The squadron participated in support for photo reconnaissance missions and conducted strikes against targets in Laos.
- 7 February 1965: Following the Attack on Camp Holloway in Pleiku, South Vietnam, the President ordered Operation Flaming Dart, a reprisal strike against North Vietnam. The squadron's target was the Vit Thu Lu Barracks. However, the strike turned back due to poor weather conditions.
- 11 February 1965: Squadron aircraft participated in Flaming Dart II, retaliatory strikes against the Chanh Hoa military barracks near Đồng Hới, North Vietnam.
- March 1965: The squadron participated in Operation Rolling Thunder strikes against the Phu Qui ammunition depot in North Vietnam.
- April 1966: The squadron departed Norfolk, Virginia, en route to Vietnam as part of an air wing composed only of attack squadrons.
- September 1969: Following a coup that overthrew the Libyan monarchy USS John F. Kennedy cut short its visit to Cannes, France, and departed for operations in the Ionian Sea. The United States later extended diplomatic recognition to the new Libyan government.

== Home port assignments ==
The squadron was assigned to these home ports, effective on the dates shown:

- NAS Alameda – 26 Mar 1952
- NAS Moffett Field – 8 Mar 1962
- NAS Lemoore – 1 Apr 1963
- NAS Alameda – 4 Aug 1968

== Aircraft assignment ==
The squadron first received the following aircraft on the dates shown:

- F6F-5 Hellcat – 21 Apr 1952
- AD-1 Skyraider – 19 May 1952
- AD-4NA Skyraider – 3 Jul 1952
- AD-4 Skyraider – Sep 1952
- AD-4L Skyraider – Oct 1952
- AD-6 Skyraider – Oct 1953
- AD-7 Skyraider – Sep 1956
- A-4C Skyhawk – 15 Jul 1965
- A-4B Skyhawk – 5 Dec 1965
- A-4C Skyhawk – Sep 1968

== See also ==
- VA-95 (U.S. Navy)
- Third VA-95 (U.S. Navy)
- Attack aircraft
- List of inactive United States Navy aircraft squadrons
- History of the United States Navy
