= VA-16 (U.S. Navy) =

Attack Squadron 16
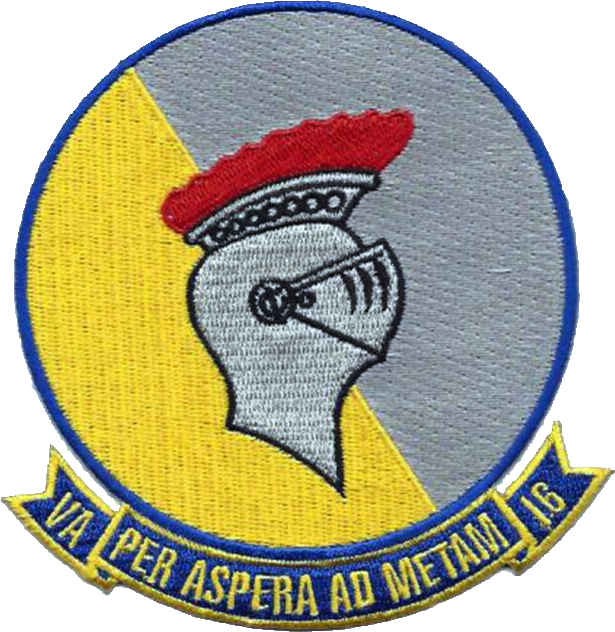
- Active: 1 June 1955 – 1 March 1958
- Country: United States
- Branch: United States Navy
- Type: Attack
- Motto(s): Per Aspera Ad Metam

Aircraft flown
- Attack: AD-6 Skyraider

VA-16 was a short-lived Attack Squadron of the United States Navy, established at NAS Oceana on 1 June 1955. Its motto was Per Aspera Ad Metam (Through Adversities to the Target). The squadron was disestablished on 1 March 1958.

== Operational history ==
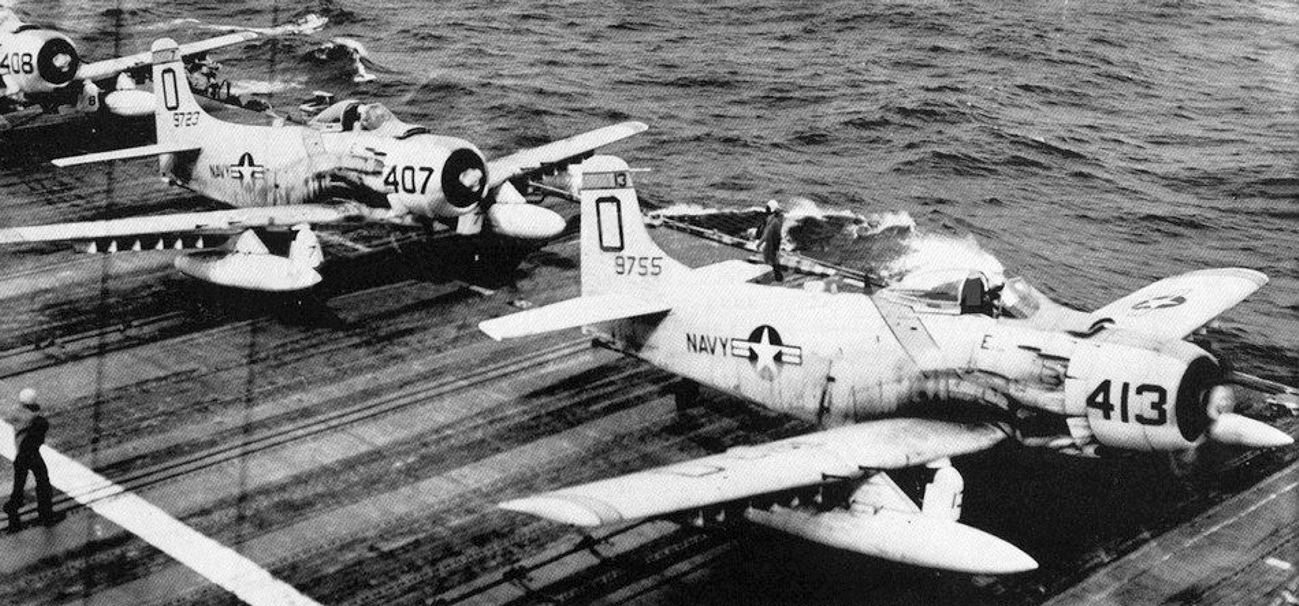
VA-16 AD-6 Skyraider aboard USS Lake Champlain in 1957.

The squadron flew AD-6 Skyraiders, and its mission was all-weather attack, including special (nuclear) weapons delivery. In April 1957, while deployed to the Mediterranean aboard USS Lake Champlain, it operated off the coast of Lebanon during the Jordanian crisis. On 18 December 1957, VA-16 conducted the first air-to-air refueling by an operational AD Skyraider squadron using the buddy store. The refueling took place over NAS Oceana and the squadron's AD-6 refueled an F9F-8. On 9 January 1958, the squadron conducted the first carrier-based AD Skyraider in-flight refueling while operating from USS Ranger.

== See also ==
- Attack aircraft
- History of the United States Navy
- List of inactive United States Navy aircraft squadrons
