= USS Mount Katmai =

Ammunition ship of the United States Navy

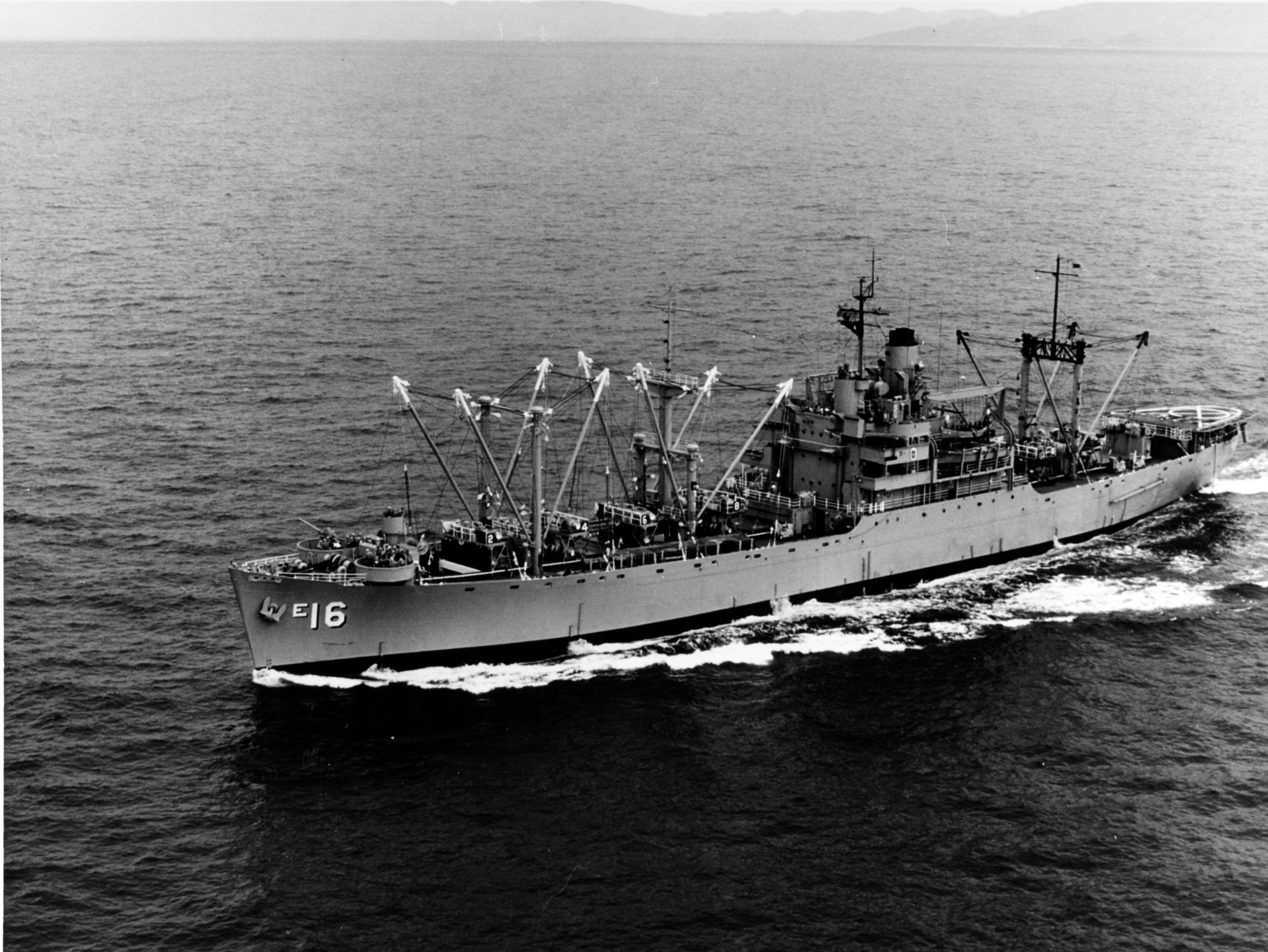

History

United States
- Name: USS Mount Katmai
- Namesake: Mount Katmai, Alaska
- Builder: North Carolina Shipbuilding Company, Wilmington, North Carolina
- Launched: 6 January 1945
- Commissioned: 21 July 1945
- Decommissioned: 14 August 1973
- Stricken: 14 August 1973
- Honors and awards: 9 battle stars (Korea); 9 campaign stars (Vietnam)
- Fate: Sold for scrap, 5 April 1974

General characteristics
- Class & type: Mount Hood-class ammunition ship
- Length: 459 ft 2 in (140 m)
- Beam: 63 ft (19.2 m)
- Draft: 28 ft 3 in (8.6 m)
- Propulsion: Geared turbine; 1 × shaft; 6,000 shp (4.5 MW)
- Speed: 16 knots (30 km/h)
- Capacity: 7,700 long tons (7,800 t) deadweight
- Complement: 267 officers and enlisted
- Aviation facilities: Helipad

USS Mount Katmai (AE-16) was a Mount Hood-class ammunition ship of the United States Navy, that saw service in the Korean War and the Vietnam War.

The ship was laid down on 11 November 1944 by North Carolina Shipbuilding Co., Wilmington, N.C.; launched on 6 January 1945, sponsored by Mrs. A. E. DeMaray; and commissioned on 21 July 1945 at Jacksonville, Florida.

== Service history ==
=== Pacific, 1945–1950 ===
After shakedown and fitting out, Mount Katmai reported to Commander Service Force Atlantic Fleet on 8 September 1945. She was then ordered to proceed to Hawaii via the Panama Canal. The ammunition ship was assigned to the western Pacific from there, arriving Leyte in mid-October 1945.

=== Korean War, 1950–1953 ===
Mount Katmai was involved in normal support operation off the Pacific coast when the Korean War began. On 22 July 1950 she deployed from San Francisco to WestPac, arriving in the combat zone on 18 August. She rearmed and replenished combatant ships of TFs 77 and 95 in the Yellow Sea and the Sea of Japan. Returning home in November 1951, she departed again for the Korean war theater in April 1952, again supporting units of TFs 77 and 95. Back in the United States in February 1953, she sailed again for the Far East in May 1953. During this deployment, she rearmed approximately 50 ships before the war ended.

=== WestPac deployments, 1954–1964 ===
Following the armistice, Mount Katmai returned to CONUS for overhaul at Mare Island Naval Shipyard. She got underway for the Far East in May 1954 for a six-month tour, the first of nine WestPac deployments in the following decade, in which she alternated service on the west coast with operations in the Far East. In December 1964 Mount Katmai commenced an extensive overhaul period, including installation of increased communications capabilities and a helicopter deck for vertical replenishment.

=== Vietnam, 1965–1973 ===
On 26 February 1965, the ship departed San Francisco, underway to a new war zone to replenish 7th Fleet ships. She arrived Subic Bay on 15 May via Pearl Harbor. Within a few days, she was underway for rearming operations in the South China Sea, servicing the carrier strike groups and combatant ships off Vietnam. Operating out of Subic, Mount Katmai provided logistical support to the operating forces until late November. She departed Hong Kong on 1 December 1965, arriving San Francisco on 16 December.

Entering Hunter's Point Naval Shipyard on 17 January 1966 for overhaul, the ship returned to an operational status with Service Force Pacific Fleet on 21 March. She participated in type and 1st Fleet training operations until 1 June when she deployed to WestPac. After a short visit in Hawaii, she arrived in her WestPac home port of Subic Bay on 25 June.

On 5 July she was underway for Yankee Station, to rearm carriers and their escorts. In addition to providing aircraft ordnance for airstrikes against North Vietnam, the ship also provided ammunition for ships engaged in support and interdiction shore fire missions along the entire Vietnamese coast.

Once more homeward bound, Mount Katmai was underway from Subic Bay on 12 January 1967, arriving San Francisco on 7 February. After overhaul in Mare Island Naval Shipyard until 19 July, and type training, the ammunition ship was ready to sail west again. Leaving San Francisco on 7 August 1967, she arrived at Subic Bay on 30 August via Pearl Harbor. Rearming operations were conducted in the South China Sea and off the coast of Vietnam with carriers and fire support ships.

Mount Katmai was underway from Subic Bay on 11 March 1968, and arrived San Francisco on 28 March. After a three-month overhaul period and type training, she left San Francisco on 31 August and arrived back at Subic Bay on 24 September. She continued to provide ammunition to U.S. and Allied combatants off the coast of Vietnam into 1973.

=== Decommissioning and sale ===
Mount Katmai was decommissioned and struck from the Naval Vessel Register on 14 August 1973. Turned over to Maritime Administration (MARAD) she was laid up in the National Defense Reserve Fleet until sold for scrapping on 5 April 1974, to Nicolai Joffe Corp., for $243,210.

== Awards ==
Mount Katmai received nine battle stars for Korean service and nine for Vietnam service.
