= VA-95 (U.S. Navy) =

Attack Squadron 95
- Active: 15 October 1943 - 30 November 1949
- Country: United States
- Branch: United States Navy
- Type: Attack
- Engagements: World War II

Aircraft flown
- Attack: TBF/M Avenger; AD-1 Skyraider

VA-95 was an Attack Squadron of the U.S. Navy. It was established as Torpedo Squadron VT-20 on 15 October 1943, and as VA-10A on 15 November 1946. It was finally redesignated as VA-95 on 12 August 1948. The squadron was disestablished on 30 November 1949. Its nickname is unknown.

Two other squadrons, unrelated to this one, subsequently bore the VA-95 designation.

== Operational history ==
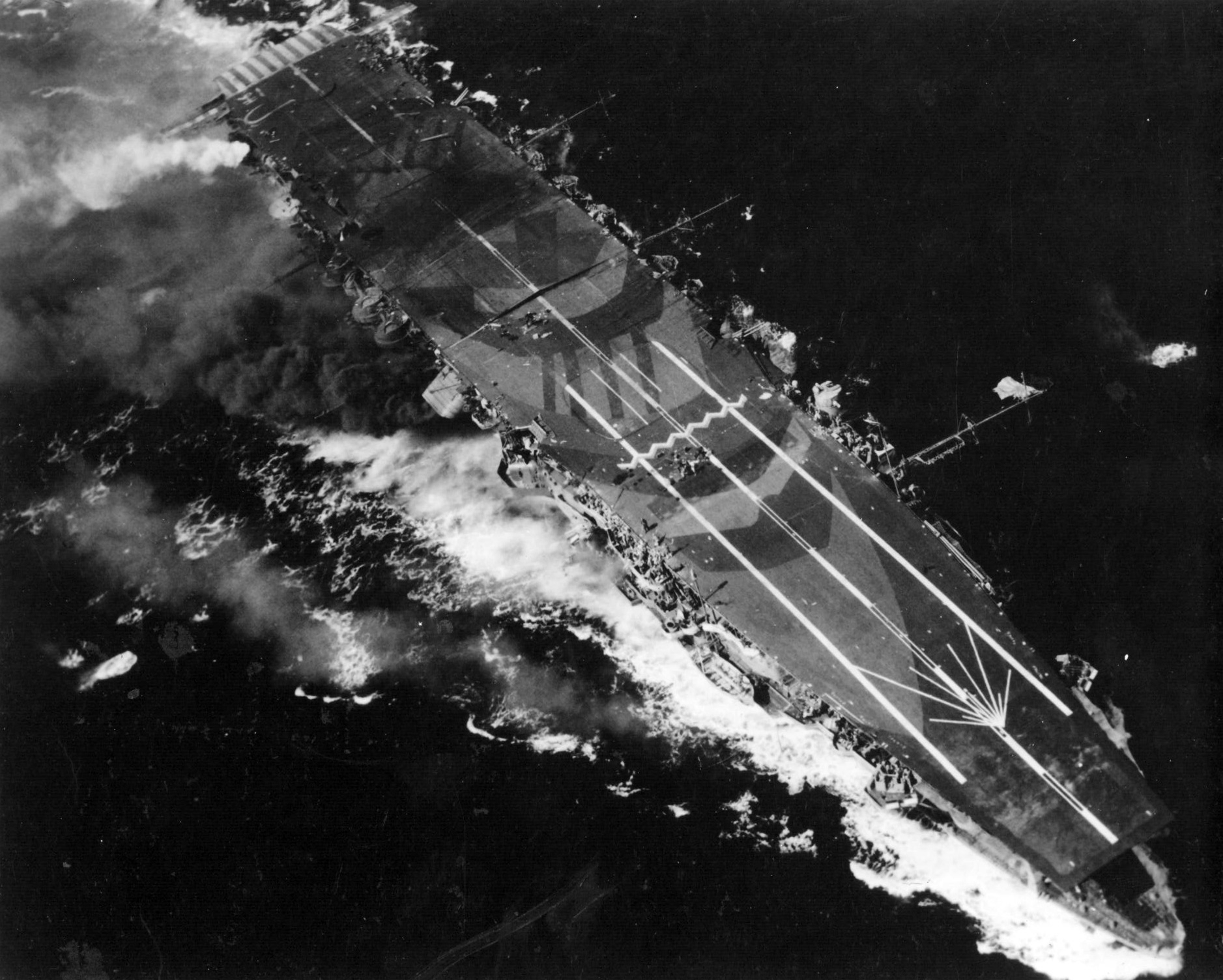
Japanese aircraft carrier Zuihō pictured from a VT-20 TBM during the Battle off Cape Engaño, October 1944

- 1 September 1944: The squadron's first combat action involved strikes against shore installations on Chichi Jima in the Bonin Islands.
- September 1944: Squadron aircraft participated in strikes against the Palau Islands in preparation for and support for the invasion of Peleliu.
- October 1944: The squadron participated in strikes against Okinawa, Formosa and Luzon in preparation for and support of the invasion of Leyte.
- 15 October 1944: Lieutenant Edward B. Holley, flying a squadron TBM, shot down a Mitsubishi A6M Zero fighter, over Luzon.
- 24 October 1944: The squadron participated in the Battle of Leyte Gulf. VT-20's TBM-1Cs flew sorties against a powerful Japanese surface force in the Sibuyan Sea. These attacks contributed to the sinking of the Japanese battleship Musashi, one of the two largest battleships in the world. The following squadron personnel were awarded the Navy Cross for their action against the Japanese task force: Ensigns W. T. Ross, W. J. Schaller, and G. Swint III; Lieutenant (junior grade) M. Throwbridge; Lieutenants C. H. H. Dickey, E. B. Holley, and R. E. McHenry, and Lieutenant Commander S. L. Prickett.
- 25 October 1944: Squadron aircraft were part of the Fast Carrier Task Force that attacked the Japanese carrier force in the Battle off Cape Engaño. Four Japanese carriers were sunk during this engagement. The following squadron personnel were awarded the Navy Cross for their action during the Battle off Cape Engaño: Ensigns T. E. Armour, J. L. Baxter, M. H. Krouse, and C. D. Leeper; Lieutenant (junior grades)s P. H. Bradley and C. F. Schlegel; and Lieutenants J. H. Howell, Jr., M. L. Leedom, E. E. Rodenburg, and R. J. Savage.
- November 1944: The squadron participated in strikes against a Japanese troop convoy in Ormoc Bay, Leyte and enemy positions on Luzon.
- December 1944: Strikes were flown against Luzon in preparation for the invasion of Lingayan Gulf, Luzon.
- January 1945: Squadron aircraft flew strikes against Luzon, Formosa, Hong Kong, Japanese convoys in South China Sea and along coast of French Indochina, and Okinawa.
- 12 January 1945: Lieutenant J. N. Howell, Jr and Lieutenant (junior grade) M. Throwbridge were awarded the Silver Star Medal for their action against a Japanese cruiser that was protecting a convoy off the coast of French Indochina. Their attacks contributed to the sinking of the cruiser.

== Home port assignments ==
The squadron was assigned to these home ports, effective on the dates shown:

- Naval Air Station San Diego – 15 Oct 1943
- Naval Air Station Barbers Point – 21 Apr 1944*
- Naval Air Station Puʻunene – 17 Jun 1944*
- Naval Air Station San Diego – 23 Feb 1945
- Naval Auxiliary Air Facility Lewiston – 16 Apr 1945
- Naval Auxiliary Air Station Edenton – Jun 1945
- Naval Auxiliary Air Station Elizabeth City – 02 Nov 1945
- Naval Auxiliary Air Station Charlestown – 21 Mar 1946

* Temporary shore assignment while the squadron conducted training in preparation for combat deployment.

== Aircraft assignment ==
The squadron first received the following aircraft on the dates shown:

- TBF-1/TBM-1 Avenger – Nov 1943
- TBM-1C Avenger – Feb 1944
- TBM-3E Avenger – Jul 1945
- AD-1 Skyraider – 01 Aug 1949

== See also ==
- Second VA-95 (U.S. Navy)
- Third VA-95 (U.S. Navy)
- Attack aircraft
- List of inactive United States Navy aircraft squadrons
- History of the United States Navy
