= Attack Squadron 105 (U.S. Navy) =

- Active: 1 May 1952 – 1 February 1959
- Country: United States
- Branch: United States Navy
- Type: Attack

Aircraft flown
- Attack: AD Skyraider

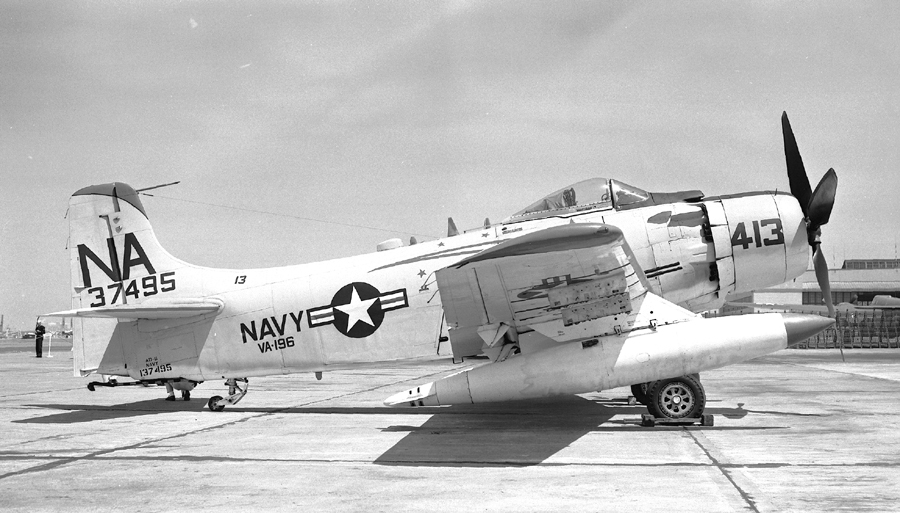
AD-6 Skyraider in 1958. VA-105 flew aircraft like this at that time

VA-105 was an Attack Squadron of the United States Navy. It was established on 1 May 1952 and disestablished on 1 February 1959. Its nickname is unknown.

== Operational history ==
VA-105 was commissioned on 1 May 1952 at NAS Cecil Field flying the AD-1 Skyraider.

On 4 March 1958 the squadron's commanding officer, Commander E. F. Ternasky, was killed during a night ditching astern of USS Essex.

In July–August 1958, the squadron flew close air support missions from Essex during the landing of U.S. Marines in Beirut, Lebanon. Aircraft from VA-105 were the first to be on station during the landings, and squadron aircraft flew road and border reconnaissance sorties. Several aircraft were damaged by ground fire on their reconnaissance missions, however all aircraft returned safely to Essex.

In September 1958 when the Chinese communists began shelling the Quemoy Island group, Essex was ordered to transit the Suez Canal and report to the U.S. Seventh Fleet for duty in the Taiwan Straits.

In November 1958, the squadron's mission was changed to training personnel in the AD-6 Skyraider.

== Home port assignments ==
The squadron was assigned to these home ports, effective on the dates shown:

- NAS Cecil Field – 1 May 1952
- NAS Jacksonville – July 1955
- NAS Cecil Field – April 1956
- NAS Jacksonville – November 1958

== Aircraft assignment ==
The squadron first received the following aircraft on the dates shown:

- AD-1 Skyraider – 9 May 1952
- AD-4 Skyraider – 22 September 1952
- AD-4NA Skyraider- September 1952
- AD-6 Skyraider – November 1954

== See also ==
- Attack aircraft
- List of inactive United States Navy aircraft squadrons
- History of the United States Navy
