= VA-45 (U.S. Navy) =

Attack Squadron 45
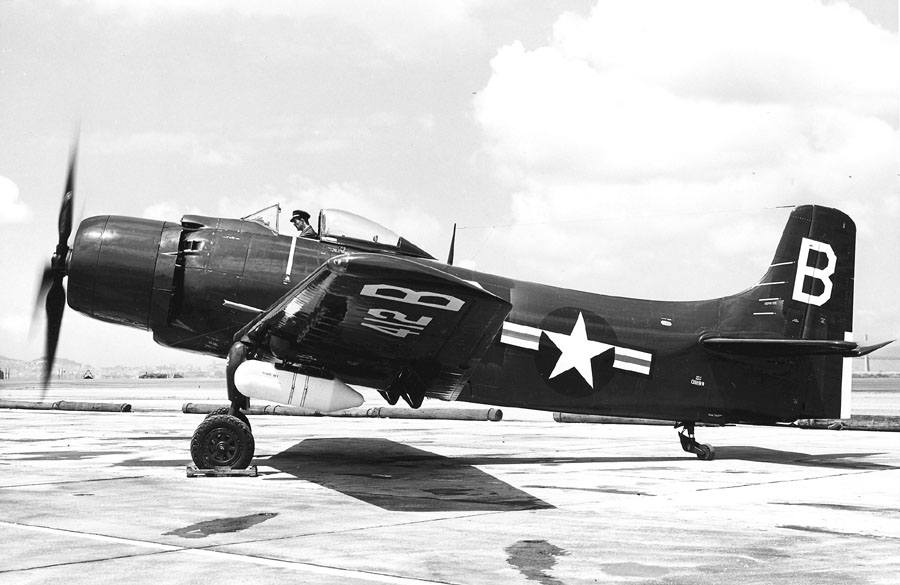
- VA-45 AD-1 in 1947
- Active: 1 June 1945 – 8 June 1950
- Country: United States
- Branch: United States Navy
- Type: Fighter
- Nickname(s): Fish-Hawks

Aircraft flown
- Attack: AD-1

VA-45, nicknamed the Fish-Hawks, was an Attack Squadron of the United States Navy. It was the first squadron to carry the VA-45 designation. The squadron was established as Torpedo Squadron VT-75 on 1 June 1945, redesignated VA-4B on 15 November 1946, and as VA-45 on 1 September 1948. It was disestablished on 8 June 1950.

== Home port assignments ==
The squadron was assigned to these home ports, effective on the dates shown:

- Naval Auxiliary Air Station Chincoteague – 1 Jun 1945
- Naval Air Station Norfolk – 20 Mar 1946
- Naval Air Station Jacksonville – 14 Feb 1949

== Aircraft assignment ==
The squadron first received the following aircraft in the months shown:

- SBF-4E – June 1945
- SBW-4E – June 1945
- SB2C-4E – September 1945
- SB2C – 5 March 1946
- AD-1 – 27 March 1947
- AM-1 – February 1949
- AD-1 – 20 October 1949

== See also ==
- Attack aircraft
- History of the United States Navy
- List of inactive United States Navy aircraft squadrons
