= Admiral Train =

Admiral Train may refer to:

- Charles J. Train (1845–1906), U.S. Navy rear admiral
- Charles R. Train (admiral) (1879–1967), U.S. Navy rear admiral
- Elizabeth L. Train (born 1955), U.S. Navy rear admiral
- Harold C. Train (1887–1968), U.S. Navy rear admiral
- Harry D. Train II (born 1927), U.S. Navy admiral
