= Charles Train =

Charles Train may refer to:

- Charles J. Train (1845–1906), American admiral
- Charles R. Train (1817–1885), American politician
- Charles R. Train (admiral) (1879–1967), his grandson, United States Navy rear admiral
- Charles William Train (1890–1965), British soldier, recipient of the Victoria Cross
