= Train (surname) =

Train is a surname. Notable people with the surname include:

- Charles J. Train (1845–1906), American naval officer
- Charles R. Train (1817–1885), American politician
- Charles R. Train (admiral) (1879–1967), American naval officer
- Charles William Train (1890–1965), British soldier, recipient of the Victoria Cross
- Louis Émile Train, French aviation pioneer.
- George Francis Train (1829–1904), American businessman, author and eccentric
- Jack Train (1902–1966), British radio and film actor
- John Train (investment advisor) (1928–2022), American investment advisor and author
- John Train (politician) (1873–1942), Unionist Party (Scotland) MP for Glasgow Cathcart
- John Butler Train, alter ego of American musician Phil Ochs
- Joseph Train (1779–1852), Scottish antiquarian
- Robert Farquhar Train (1869–1951), English-American architect
- Winnifred Train (1904–1979), New Zealand army nurse, hospital matron, nurses' association leader
