= John Goodrich =

John Goodrich may refer to:

- John Goodrich (Loyalist) (1722–1785), Virginia-born British planter, merchant shipper, and privateer
- John Z. Goodrich (1804–1885), member of the U.S. House of Representatives from Massachusetts
- John B. Goodrich (1836–1900), American lawyer and politician
- John F. Goodrich (1887–1937), American screenwriter
