= VT58 =

VT58 may refer to:

- Vermont Route 58, a highway in the United States
- Torpedo Squadron Fifty Eight (VT-58), a United States Navy aircraft squadron
