= Admiral Turner =

Admiral Turner may refer to:

- Arthur Francis Turner (1912–1991), British naval officer
- Frederick C. Turner (1923–2014), U.S. Navy vice admiral
- Richmond K. Turner (1885–1961), served in the U.S. Navy during World War II
- Stansfield Turner (1923–2018), Admiral and former Director of Central Intelligence
