= USS Sandoval (APA-194) =

Haskell-class attack transport

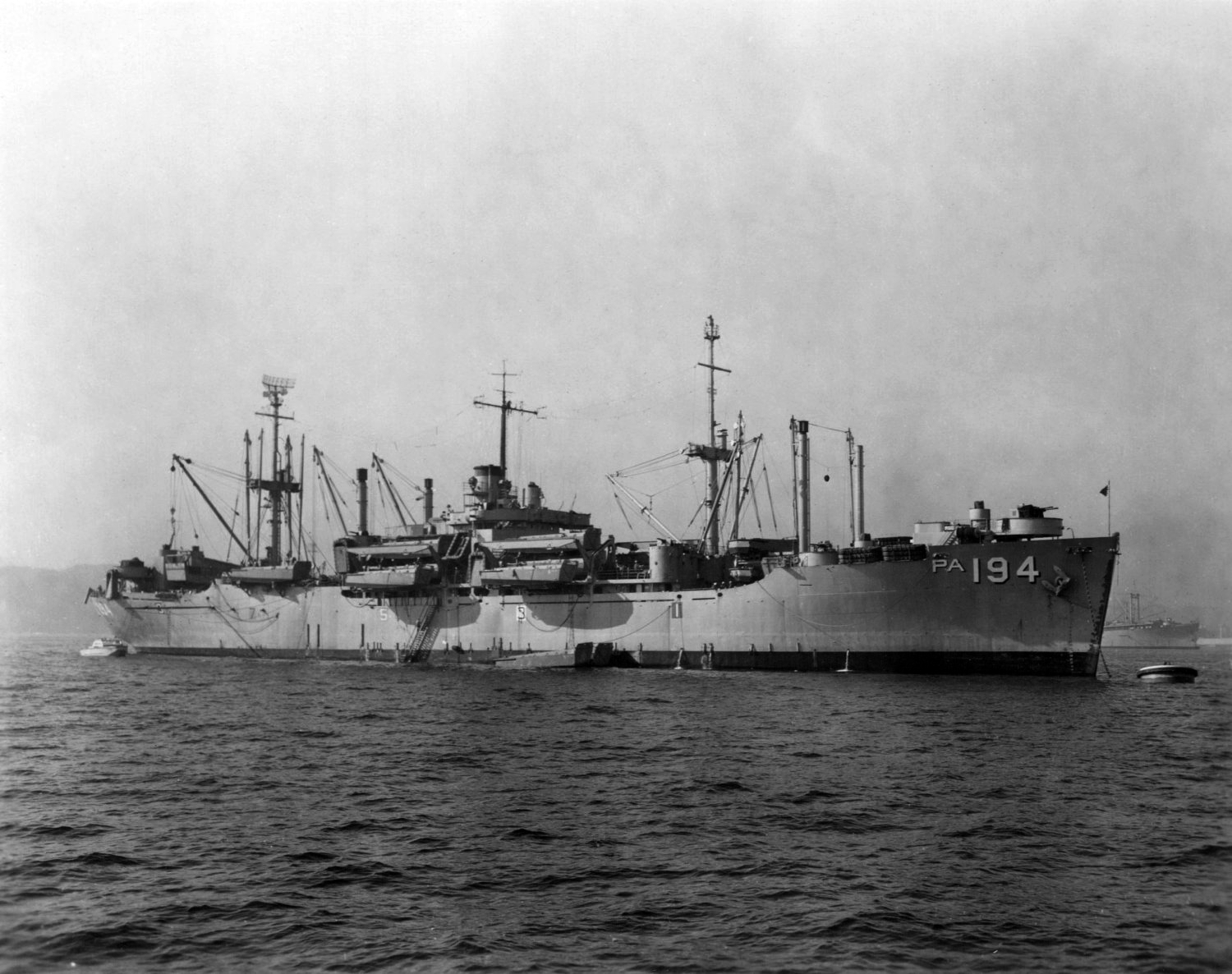

History

United States
- Name: USS Sandoval
- Namesake: Sandoval County, New Mexico
- Ordered: as type VC2-S-AP5; MCV hull 662
- Laid down: 16 May 1944
- Launched: 2 September 1944
- Acquired: 7 October 1944
- Commissioned: 7 October 1944
- Decommissioned: 19 July 1946
- In service: 22 September 1951
- Out of service: 3 March 1970
- Stricken: 1 December 1976
- Home port: Long Beach, California, Norfolk, Virginia, Morehead City, North Carolina
- Fate: Scrapped, 1983

General characteristics
- Displacement: 14,833 (full load)
- Length: 455 ft 0 in (138.68 m)
- Beam: 62 ft 0 in (18.90 m)
- Draught: 28 ft 1 in (8.56 m)
- Speed: 17 knots
- Boats & landing craft carried: two LCM, twelve LCVP, three LCPU
- Capacity: 150,000 cu. ft, 2,900 tons
- Complement: 56 Officers 480 Enlisted
- Armament: one 5 in (130 mm) gun mount, twelve 40 mm mounts, ten 20 mm mounts

USS Sandoval (APA-194/LPA-194) was a Haskell-class attack transport in service with the United States Navy from 1944 to 1946, 1951–1955, and 1961–1970. She was scrapped in 1983.

== History ==
=== Dedication of USS Sandoval to the Sandoval family ===
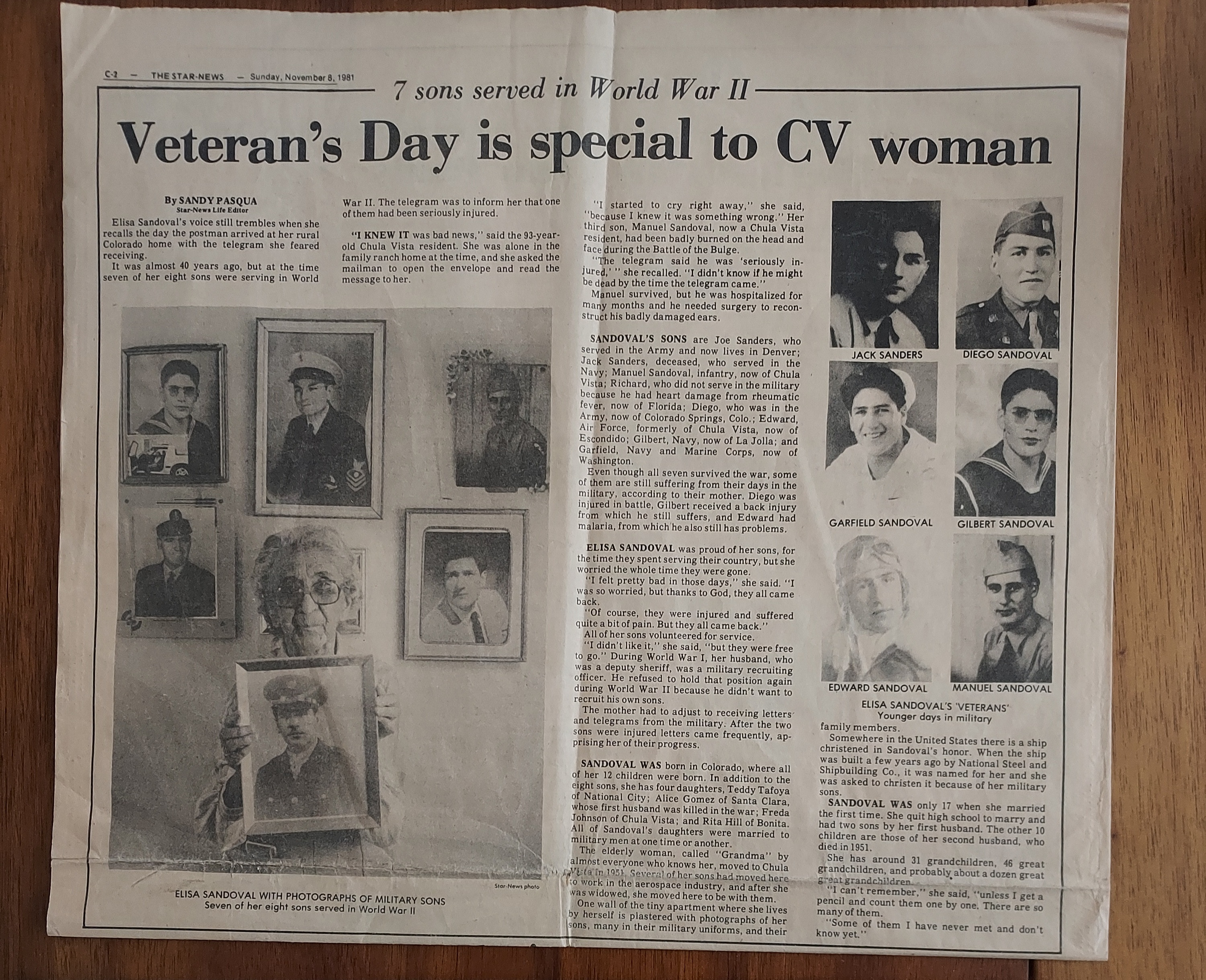

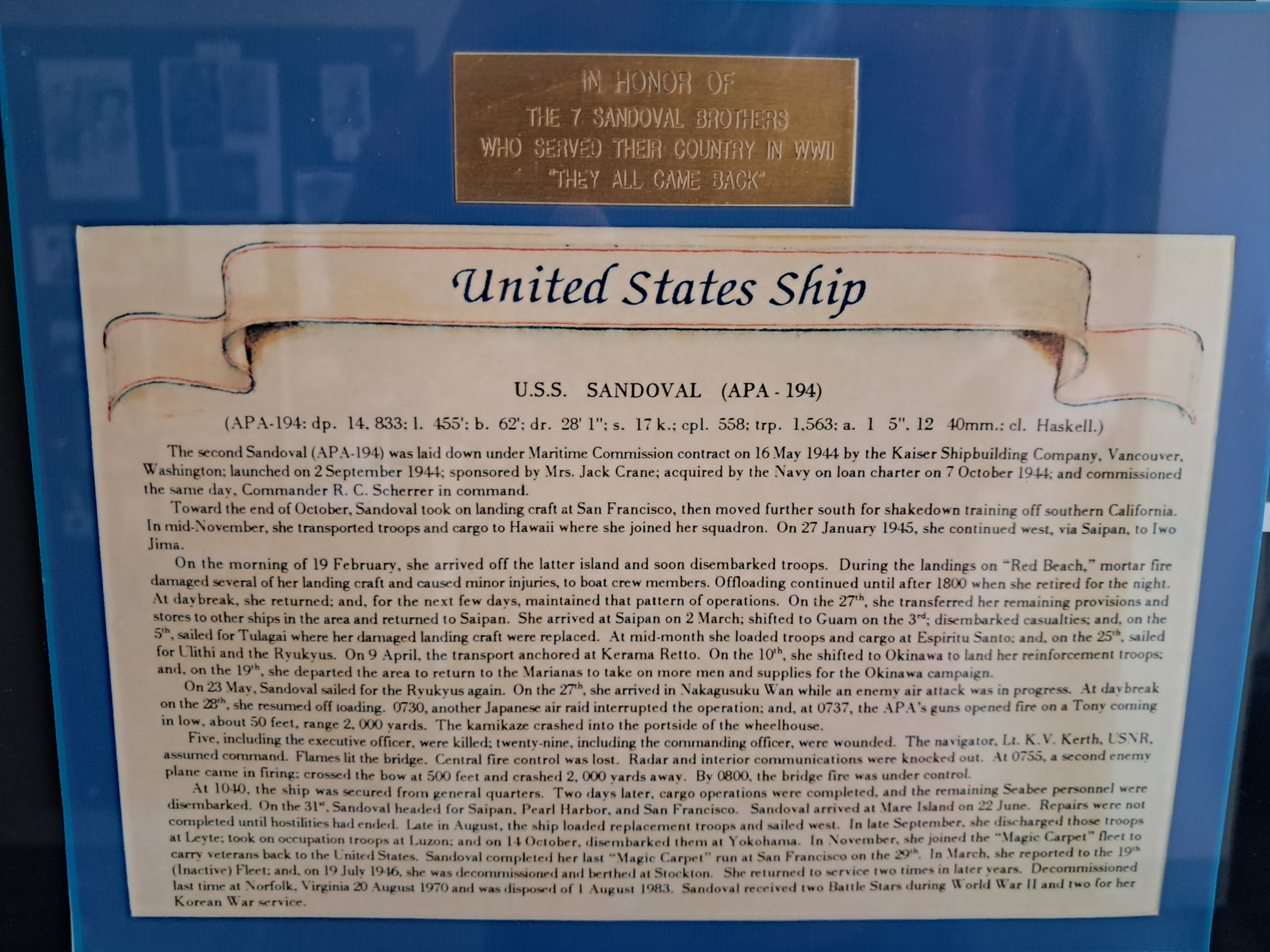
USS Sandoval

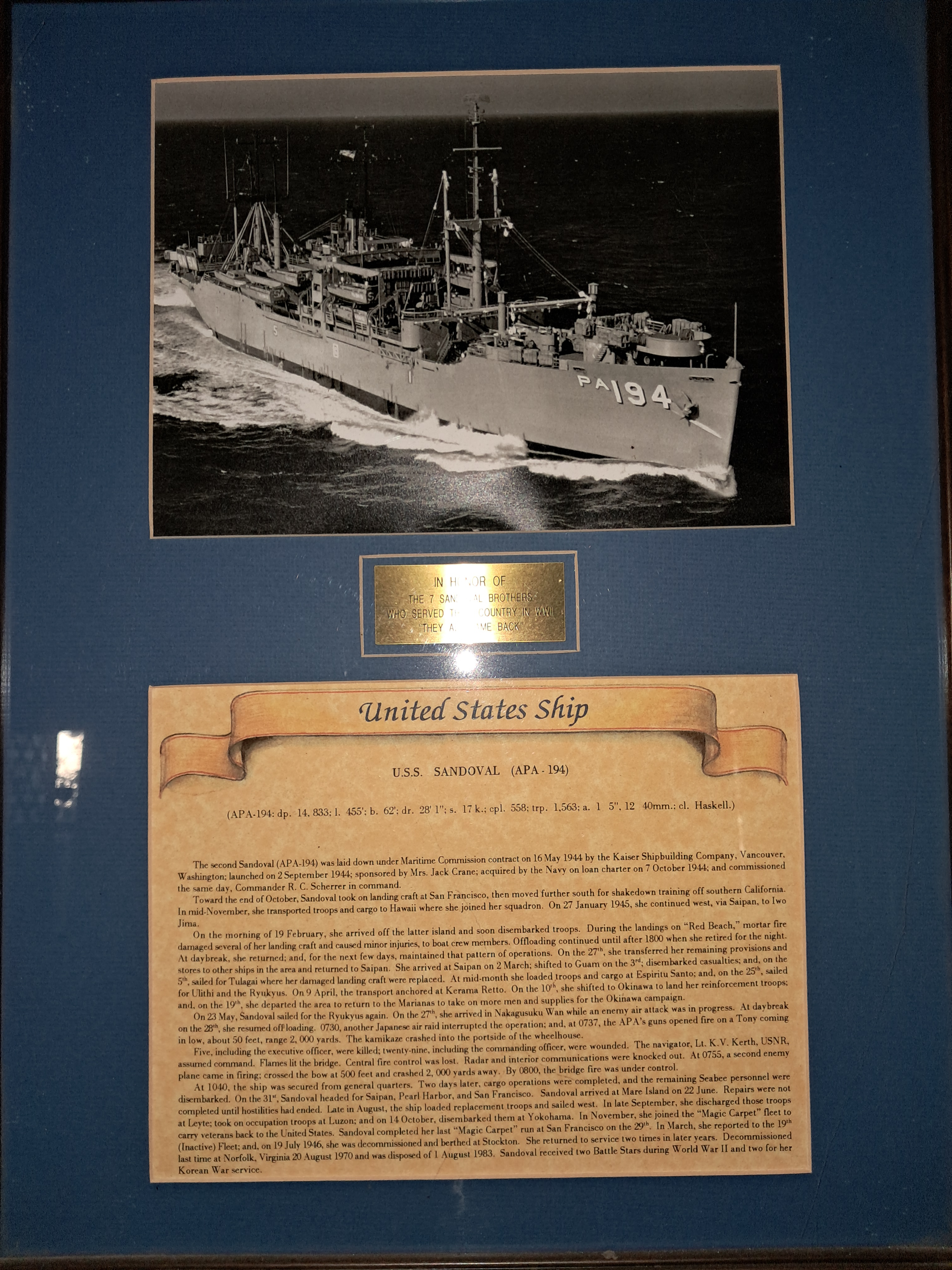
Sandoval Brothers plaque

The dedication of the USS Sandoval was in 1944 to Eliza Sandoval of Chula Vista, California, seven of whose eight sons served in World War II. All seven returned home from World War II alive. Eliza was to christen the USS Sandoval, but her husband was ill and she stayed by his side to take care of him. Her sons who served in World War II were: Joe Sanders, Jack Sanders, Manuel Rupert Sandoval, Edward Sandoval, Gilbert Sandoval, Garfield Sandoval, and Diego Sandoval.

=== World War II ===
Sandoval was laid down under United States Maritime Commission contract (MCV hull 662) on 16 May 1944 by the Kaiser Shipbuilding Co., Vancouver, Washington; launched on 2 September 1944; sponsored by Mrs. Jack Crane; acquired by the Navy on loan charter on 7 October 1944; and commissioned the same day.

Toward the end of October, Sandoval took on landing craft at San Francisco, California, then moved further south for shakedown training off southern California. In mid-November, she transported troops and cargo to Hawaii, where she joined Transport Squadron 16. Amphibious training followed with the 3d Battalion, 27th Regiment, 5th Marine Division, embarked, and on 27 January 1945, she continued west, via Saipan, to Iwo Jima.

On the morning of 19 February, she arrived off the latter island and soon disembarked her troops. During the landings on "Red Beach" , mortar fire damaged several of her landing craft and caused minor injuries to boat crew members. Despite heavy resistance, though, the 27th Regiment took the cliffs overlooking the western beaches by midafternoon, and Sandoval moved in again to take on casualties and discharge critical cargo. Offloading continued until after 1800, when she retired for the night. At daybreak, she returned and for the next few days maintained that pattern of operations. On 27 February, she transferred her remaining provisions and stores to other ships in the area and joined TU 51.16.7 to return to Saipan.

She arrived at Saipan on 2 March, shifted to Guam on 3 March, disembarked casualties, and on 5 March, sailed for Tulagi, where her damaged landing craft were replaced. At midmonth, she loaded troops and cargo of the Army's 105th Regiment, U.S. 27th Division, at Espiritu Santo, and on 25 March sailed for Ulithi and the Ryukyus. On 9 April, the transport anchored at Kerama Retto. On 10 April, she shifted to the Hagushi beaches of Okinawa to land her reinforcement troops, and on 19 April, she departed the area to return to the Marianas to take on more men and supplies for the Okinawa campaign.

On 23 May, Sandoval sailed for the Ryukyus again, with naval construction battalion (Seabee) units and equipment embarked. On 27 May, she arrived in Nakagusuku Wan, while an enemy air attack was in progress. After the raid, she commenced offloading and continued the work throughout the day despite interruptions by later raids. At daybreak on 28 May, she resumed offloading. Soon after 0730, however, the operation was interrupted by another Japanese air raid; at 0737, the APA's guns opened fire on a Tony coming in low, about 50 feet (15 m), range 2,000 yards (1,800 m). The kamikaze crashed into the port side of the wheelhouse.

Eight, including the executive officer, were killed; 26, including the commanding officer, were wounded. Three of the wounded died later. The navigator, Lt. K. V. Kerth, USNR, assumed command. Flames lit the bridge. Central fire control was lost. Radar and interior communications were knocked out. At 0755, a second enemy plane came in firing, crossed the bow at 500 feet (150 m), and crashed 2,000 yards (1,800 m) away. By 0800, the bridge fire was under control. Fifteen minutes later, a third kamikaze came in, missed Sandoval, and crashed the foredeck of SS Joseph Snelling, 600 yards (550 m) off the APA's starboard quarter. At 0830, the fire on the bridge was extinguished. After 0900, central fire control was regained, and repair parties began clearing the wreckage. At 1040, the ship was secured from general quarters.

Two days later, cargo operations were completed, and the remaining Seabee personnel were disembarked. On 31 May, Sandoval headed for Saipan, Pearl Harbor, and San Francisco.

Sandoval arrived at Mare Island, California, on 22 June. Repairs were not completed until hostilities had ended. Late in August, the ship loaded replacement troops and sailed west. In late September, she discharged those troops at Leyte and took on occupation troops at Luzon; on 14 October, she disembarked them at Yokohama. By the end of the month, she had completed a second Luzon–Honshū run in support of the occupation of Japan; in November, she joined the Operation Magic Carpet fleet to carry veterans back to the United States.

Sandoval completed her last Magic Carpet run at San Francisco on 29 November. Then, for a brief time, she provided services to small craft in the San Francisco Bay area. In March, she reported to the 19th (Inactive) Fleet, and on 19 July 1946, she was decommissioned and berthed at Stockton, California.

=== Korean War ===
Five years later, after war had again broken out in the Far East, Sandoval was ordered activated to support the United Nations effort in Korea. Recommissioned on 22 September 1951, she joined the Pacific Fleet's Amphibious Force in mid-October; after operations off the U.S. West Coast, she sailed west on 3 March 1952.

On the 24th, she arrived in Japan, and in mid-April, she carried cargo to Inchon, whence she moved troops to Koje Do to assist in stemming the prisoner of war (POW) riots on that island. In May and early June, she conducted amphibious training exercises, and at mid-month, she headed south to the Philippines and Hong Kong. In July, she returned to Japan, where she resumed cargo and amphibious training operations. In August, she sailed for home, arriving at Long Beach, California, on the 24th. She then shifted to San Francisco, and after voyage repairs, returned to San Diego, whence she conducted exercises until December. Overhaul took her into February 1953, and in the spring, she resumed training duties off southern California.

On 3 July, Sandoval again headed west. She arrived in Japan the day after the truce went into effect; in early August, she assisted in transporting POWs from the offshore islands to the Korean mainland for exchange. She then returned to Japan, and for the remainder of her extended tour in the western Pacific, carried cargo and conducted training exercises in Japanese, Korean, and Okinawan waters. In April 1954, she returned to California, and after local exercises, prepared for inactivation. She completed inactivation overhaul and was decommissioned at Mare Island, California, on 22 June 1955. Four and one-half years later, on 10 December 1959, she was transferred to the Maritime Administration's National Defense Reserve Fleet, and on 1 July 1960, her name was struck from the Navy list.

=== Cold War ===
A little over a year later, however, she was recalled, reinstated on the Navy list on 1 September 1961, and recommissioned on 20 November 1961. Assigned to the U.S. Atlantic Fleet, she transited the Panama Canal, joined that fleet's amphibious force on 17 January 1962, and soon thereafter, commenced operations out of Norfolk, Virginia.

Into the summer, Sandoval conducted training exercises, primarily with U.S. Marine Corps units, off the Virginia and Carolina coasts, and in Puerto Rico. In August, she conducted gunnery exercises, then carried Army personnel and vehicles from Norfolk to the Panama Canal Zone and transported Marine Corps vehicles from Puerto Rico to Norfolk. Local landing exercises and an availability took her into October, when the Cuban Missile Crisis erupted. Sandoval moved to Morehead City, North Carolina, embarked marines, and steamed south to stand by in case of need. At the end of November, as international tension eased, she returned to Norfolk, where she remained into the new year, 1963. She then resumed local exercises, transportation operations, and training exercises along the Eastern Seaboard and in the Caribbean.

With the end of summer, she prepared for her first deployment with the U.S. 6th Fleet, and on 21 September, she departed Morehead City. She operated in the Mediterranean for five months, returned to Norfolk in February, resumed duty with Amphibious Squadron 10 (PhibRon 10), and in the fall, headed back across the Atlantic to the coast of Spain, where she participated in Operation Steel Pike, the largest landing exercise in the Atlantic since World War II. Effective 14 August 1964, the ship was redesignated LPA-194.

During the next several years, Sandoval rotated between duty with PHIBRON 10 in the western Atlantic and operations in the Mediterranean as a unit of PhibRon 6. She stood by on alert with the 6th Fleet during the 1967 Arab–Israeli war, and turned to scientific tasks the following year. During February 1968, she assisted test and evaluation forces off Florida, and in December, she operated some 600 miles (970 km) west of the Canary Islands as a unit of the Manned Spacecraft Recovery Force for Apollo 8. In 1969, she resumed training exercises, and on 19 March, she sailed east for her last deployment with the 6th Fleet. Well into the summer, she participated in fleet, binational, and NATO exercises; on 5 August, she got underway for Morehead City and Norfolk, where she arrived on the 19th and a week later received orders to prepare for inactivation.

=== Final decommissioning and fate ===
On 3 March 1970, Sandoval was decommissioned and turned over to the Inactive Ship Maintenance Facility, Norfolk. On 20 August 1970, she was transferred to the custody of the Maritime Administration and laid up with the James River, Virginia, Group, National Defense Reserve Fleet, where she remained into July 1974. On 1 December 1976, she was struck from the Navy list again and was disposed of by the MARAD on 1 August 1983. She was sold Isaac Varela Davalillo, for scrapping in Spain.

== Awards ==
Sandoval received two battle stars during World War II and two for her Korean War service. In 1966, while under command of Captain Frederick C. Turner, Sandoval received Navy "E" for battle efficiency.
