= Paul Becker (admiral) =

American admiral and intelligence chief (born 1961)

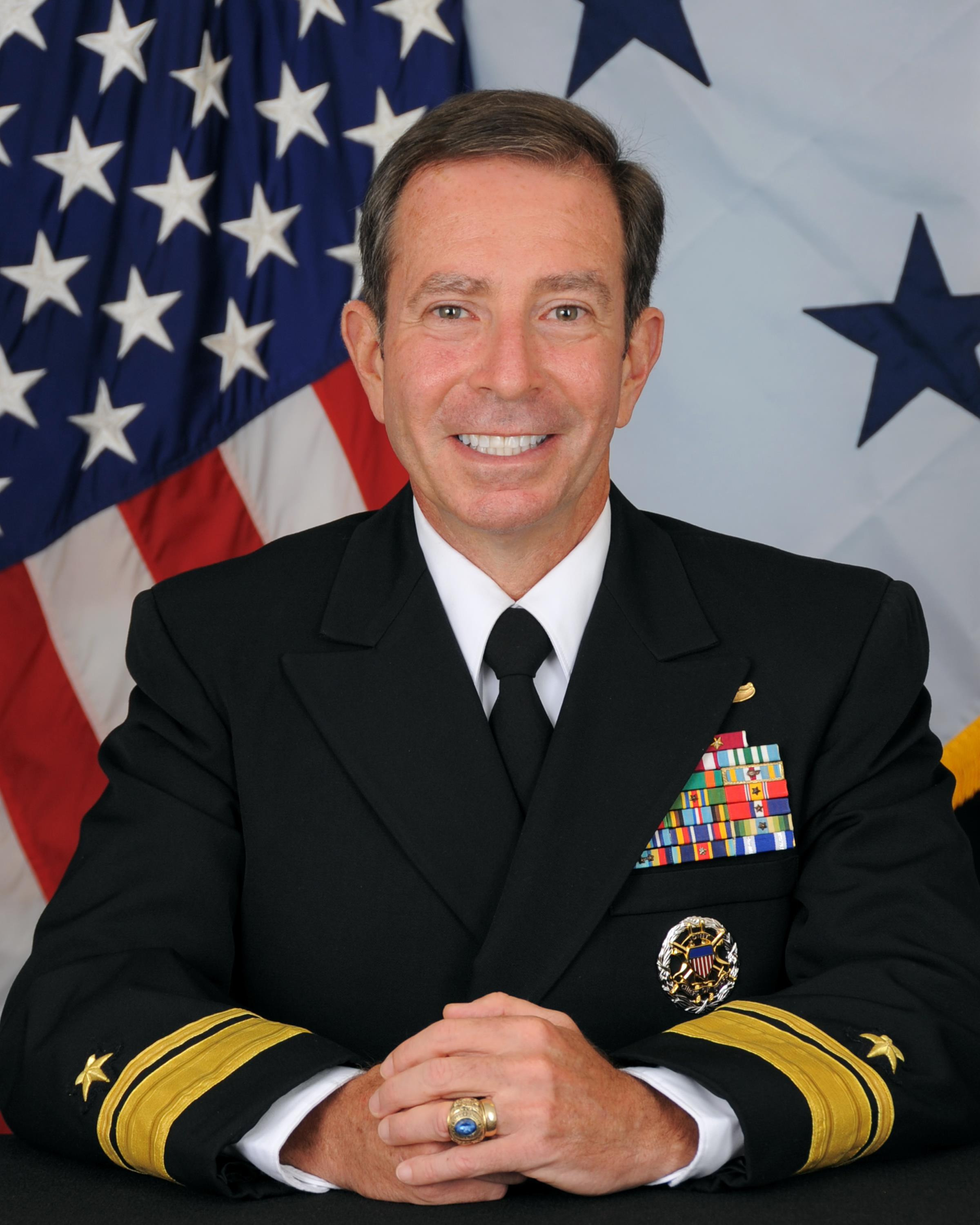
- Becker in September 2013
- Born: August 1961 (age 65)
- Military career
- Allegiance: United States of America
- Branch: United States Navy
- Service years: 1983–2016
- Rank: Rear Admiral
- Commands: Director for Intelligence, Joint Staff (J2); Commander, U.S. Pacific Command; Director for Intelligence for the International Security Assistance Force Joint Command in Afghanistan; Commanding Officer, Joint Intelligence Center, U.S. Central Cammand; Director of Intelligence, U.S. Naval Forces Central Command; Assistant U.S. Naval Attaché Paris
- Awards: National Intelligence Distinguished Service Medal; Ellis Island Medal of Honor (2015); National Military Intelligence Association’s Rufus Taylor Award for Leadership; U.S. Army’s Knowlton Award for Military Intelligence; Office of Naval Intelligence’s Edwin Layton Award for Leadership; Defense Superior Service Medal (5); Legion of Merit (2); Defense Meritorious Service Medal (2); Joint Service Commendation Medal; Navy and Marine Corps Commendation Medal (3)

Paul Brian Becker (born August 1961) is a retired United States Navy admiral and the former Director for Intelligence, Joint Staff (J2). As the JCS J2, RADM Becker was the principal intelligence advisor to the Chairman of the Joint Chiefs of Staff.

== Career ==
Paul Becker was commissioned an intelligence officer upon graduation from the United States Naval Academy in 1983. Significant afloat assignments include intelligence officer with Attack Squadron (VA) 35 (A6E/Intruder) aboard USS Nimitz (CVN-68); temporary assignment aboard battleship, USS Iowa (BB-61); intelligence operations officer for the United States 6th Fleet aboard cruiser USS Belknap (CG-26); and N2 with Carrier Strike Group 7 aboard USS John C. Stennis (CVN-74). Shore assignments include: analyst at the Chief of Naval Operations Intelligence Plot; flag aide to the director of Naval Intelligence; intelligence branch/assignments officer at the Bureau of Personnel; Federal Executive Fellow at the Fletcher School of Law and Diplomacy; the American Embassy in Paris as the assistant U.S. Naval Attaché; temporary assignment with the American Embassy in Skopje, Macedonia as the assistant Defense Attaché (during Operation Allied Force), and the director of Operations at the Joint Intelligence Center Pacific in Hawaii. In addition to service in Afghanistan from 2009 to 2010, his duty with U.S. Central Command (CENTCOM) since 9/11 includes: commanding officer of CENTCOM’s Joint Intelligence Center in Tampa, Florida, from 2007 to 2009; director of Intelligence (N2) for U.S. Naval Forces Central Command in Bahrain from 2005 to 2007; Intelligence Watch officer in the Combined Air Operations Center at Prince Sultan Air Base in Saudi Arabia in 2003 during early Iraqi Freedom operations; and, N2 for the U.S. Navy’s Task Force 50 in the Northern Arabian Sea from 2001 to 2002 during early Enduring Freedom operations. Becker has been the Director for Intelligence (J2) on the Joint Chiefs of Staff since September 2013. Previous flag assignments include director for Intelligence with United States Pacific Command in Hawaii, vice director of Intelligence for the Joint Chiefs of Staff in Washington, D.C., and director of Intelligence for the International Security Assistance Force Joint Command in Afghanistan.

== Awards ==
- Navy Distinguished Service Medal

== Education ==
- 1983 Bachelor of Science, U.S. Naval Academy, Annapolis, Maryland
- 2001 Master’s in Public Administration, Harvard University’s John F. Kennedy School of Government
- 1991 Diploma, Defense Language Institute (French)
- 1993 Diploma, Naval Command and Staff College (With Highest Distinction)
- 1996 Diploma, Armed Forces Staff College

== Attribution ==
Military offices
Preceded by Elizabeth L. Train	Director of Intelligence of the Joint Staff; 2013–2015	Succeeded by James R. Marrs
