= Frederick C. Turner =

American Vice admiral

Frederick Charles Turner
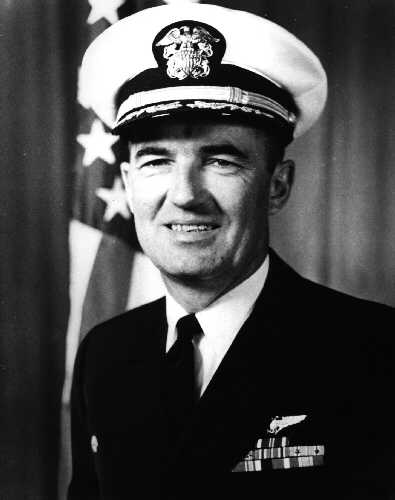
- Born: June 13, 1923; Boston, Massachusetts, U.S.
- Died: April 24, 2014 (aged 90); Fairfax, Virginia, U.S.
- Burial place: Arlington National Cemetery
- Military career
- Allegiance: United States
- Branch: United States Navy
- Service years: 1942–1979
- Rank: Vice admiral
- Nickname: "Fox"
- Commands: United States Sixth Fleet; Carrier Division 2 USS America; USS Sandoval; Carrier Air Group 3 Fighter Squadron 32
- Conflicts: World War II: Battle of Iwo Jima; Battle of Okinawa; Vietnam War
- Awards: Distinguished Service Medal; Legion of Merit (4); Distinguished Flying Cross; Air Medal (3)

Frederick Charles Turner (June 13, 1923 – April 24, 2014) was a highly decorated officer in the United States Navy with the rank of vice admiral. Turner began his career as Reservist and naval aviator during World War II and distinguished himself during Battles of Iwo Jima and Okinawa in early 1945. Following the War, Turner remained in the Navy and commanded aircraft carrier USS America during Vietnam War.

He later rose to the Flag rank and commanded Carrier Division 2 and United States Sixth Fleet in the Mediterranean Sea during the period of unrests in Lebanon. Turner completed his career as Deputy Chief of Naval Operations for Air Warfare in July 1979.

== Early career and World War II ==
Frederick C. Turner was born on June 13, 1923, in Boston, Massachusetts, the son of Charles J. and Margaret Turner. He graduated from the high school in summer 1941 and following the Japanese Attack on Pearl Harbor, he tried to enlist the United States Navy, but was rejected due to young age. His parents refused to sign enlistment papers for him and young Frederick had to wait for next six months. Finally in summer of the following year, his father approved it and Turner enlisted the United States Navy on July 28, 1942.

He was assigned to the Naval Aviation Cadet Training Program and ordered to Naval Air Station Pensacola, Florida, for flight training. Turner completed the basic flight training in late 1943 and was commissioned ensign in the United States Navy Reserve on December 21, 1943. He was subsequently ordered for the operational training at Naval Air Station Melbourne, Florida, and remained there until March 1944, practicing aerial gunnery.

Turner was subsequently assigned to the Fighter Squadron 82 in San Diego, California, and after almost a year of training, his squadron embarked aboard the aircraft carrier USS Bennington for Southwest Pacific as the part of the United States Fifth Fleet under Admiral Raymond A. Spruance. Turner flew his Grumman F6F Hellcat during the bombing missions against Japanese homeland airfields, including Tokyo and later participated in the support operations at Iwo Jima and Okinawa in early 1945. His squadron lost 15 of total 45 pilots and Turner was decorated with Distinguished Flying Cross and three Air Medals for heroism and extraordinary achievement. He was promoted to lieutenant junior grade on March 1, 1945.

== Postwar service ==
By the end of May 1945, Turner was transferred to the famous Fighter Squadron 17A, a first Navy Jet Squadron and participated in the occupation of Japan. He remained in the Navy and served with that squadron until June 1947, when he was sent to the Naval Test Center, Patuxent River, Maryland, where he entered the Tactical Test&Test Pilot School.

While at the School, Turner flew a McDonnell F2H Banshee from the East Coast to the West Coast in an attempt to chase the setting sun. The photos he took from Jacksonville, Florida; Dallas, El Paso, Texas, and San Diego were published in the January 2, 1950 Life Magazine, in an article showing the incredible speed at which people could then travel. Turner was flying at nearly 600 miles per hour.

Turner completed the school in December 1949 was then sent to the Empire Test Pilots School, Farnborough, England and Graduated No. 2 in his class in December 1950. While at Patuxent River, Turner was promoted to the rank of lieutenant on January 1, 1949.

Turner then returned to the United States and joined the Experimental Squadron 3 at Naval Air Station Atlantic City, New Jersey. He served as a Project Officer until February 1952, when he entered the University of Pennsylvania in Philadelphia. Turner entered the Naval Postgraduate School in Monterey, California, in August 1953 and completed the school in April 1954.

He was subsequently ordered to Naval Air Station Oceana, Virginia, where he joined Fighter Squadron 83. Turner was promoted to lieutenant commander on July 1, 1954, and remained with the squadron until June 1956.

Turner was subsequently assigned to the staff, Commander-in-Chief, United States Atlantic Fleet under Admiral Jerauld Wright and served at headquarters at Norfolk Navy Yard until July 1958, when he was sent to the Armed Forces Staff College at Norfolk. He graduated in February 1959 and joined the Bureau of Naval Personnel in Washington, D.C., under Vice Admiral Harold P. Smith. While in this capacity, he was promoted to commander on July 1, 1959, and graduated with Bachelor of Science degree from the correspondence course at University of Maryland.

In August 1961, Turner was ordered to at Naval Air Station Cecil Field, Florida, where he completed Replacement Pilot Training in October that year and assumed command of Fighter Squadron 32 stationed there. He commanded the squadron until May 1962, when he was appointed commanding officer, Carrier Air Group 3 stationed also at Cecil Field.

Turner was ordered to the Industrial College of the Armed Forces in Washington, D.C., in August 1963 and following the graduation in July 1964, he was promoted to the rank of captain. While in Washington, he also graduated with Master of Science degree from Business Administration from the George Washington University. He was subsequently attached to the Staff of Carrier Division Six at Naval Station Mayport, Florida.

== Vietnam War ==
In November 1965, Turner was appointed commanding officer of the attack transport ship, USS Sandoval and participated in the patrol cruises in the Atlantic ocean. While under his command, Sandoval was awarded with the Navy "E" for battle efficiency by the Secretary of the Navy.

Turner was subsequently ordered to command aircraft carrier USS America in July 1967 and sailed for the Southeast Asia. He commanded his ship during the air strikes against North Vietnamese supply lines and other targets in North Vietnam and received Legion of Merit with Combat "V" for his leadership. The USS America was awarded Navy Unit Commendation, Navy "E" for battle efficiency and Admiral Flatley Memorial Award for outstanding achievement in accident prevention, while under his command. Turner also received National Order of Vietnam and Gallantry Cross with Palm by the Government of South Vietnam.

Following the promotion to rear admiral on June 7, 1968, Turner assumed duty as Chief of Naval Advanced Training at Naval Air Station Corpus Christi, Texas, and was responsible for the training of naval replacement personnel until June 1970. He was decorated with second Legion of Merit for that service.

Turner was subsequently ordered to Washington, D.C., and appointed assistant chief of naval personnel for personnel control under Vice Admiral Dick H. Guinn. He served in that assignment until May 1972 and received third Legion of Merit for his service. Turner subsequently assumed command of Carrier Division 2 with headquarters in Athens, Greece and mostly in the Atlantic ocean and Mediterranean Sea.

He was decorated with fourth Legion of Merit and transferred to command of United States Sixth Fleet with headquarters at Naval Support Activity Naples, Italy in July 1974. Turner was promoted to vice admiral on August 5, 1974, for his new billet and his command participated in the reopening of Suez Canal and conducted two evacuations of Beirut during the Lebanese Civil War. For his service with Sixth Fleet, Turner was decorated with Navy Distinguished Service Medal and also received Tunisian Order of the Republic by President Habib Bourguiba.

Turner was ordered to Washington, D.C., in September 1976 and assumed duty as deputy chief of naval operations for air warfare under CNO, Admiral Thomas B. Hayward. While at the Pentagon, he was the Navy sponsor of the F/A-18 Hornet. He served in this capacity until June 30, 1979, when he retired after 37 years of active duty. Turner was the last Navy World War II carrier pilot to leave active duty.

== Retirement ==
Upon his retirement from the Navy, Turner settled in Virginia and worked as a consultant for Teledyne Technologies, and for the French defense company Pyrotechnics Lacroix. He was active in the Golden Eagles, an exclusive organization of notable Naval Aviation pioneers and in the Tailhook Association, where he was named Tailhooker of the year 1979.

He flew a single-engine Cessna 210, which he owned and played golf in his free time and was keenly interested in History and Science. Turner was married to Betty for 68 years and they had three sons: Frederick C. III, Robert, and David; and two daughters: Pamela Hauge, a retired Naval Officer, and Susan Turner.

Vice admiral Frederick C. Turner died on April 24, 2014, aged 90, at his home in Fairfax, Virginia. He was buried with full military honors at Arlington National Cemetery, Virginia. The members of the Golden Eagles served as honorary pallbearers and also provided a eulogy.

== Decorations ==
Here is the ribbon bar of Vice admiral Frederick C. Turner:

Naval Aviator Badge
1st Row	Navy Distinguished Service Medal		
2nd Row	Legion of Merit with Combat "V" and three 5/16" Gold Stars	Distinguished Flying Cross	Air Medal with two 5/16" Gold Stars
3rd Row	Navy Unit Commendation	Navy E Ribbon (Two awards)	American Campaign Medal
4th Row	Asiatic–Pacific Campaign Medal with two 3/16 inch bronze service stars	World War II Victory Medal	Navy Occupation Service Medal
5th Row	National Defense Service Medal with one star	Vietnam Service Medal with one 3/16 inch bronze service star	National Order of Vietnam
6th Row	Vietnam Gallantry Cross with Palm	Vietnam Campaign Medal	Tunisian Order of the Republic

== See also ==
- USS America (CV-66)

Military offices
Preceded by Forrest S. Petersen	Deputy Chief of Naval Operations for Air Warfare; October 6, 1976 – June 30, 1979	Succeeded by Wesley L. McDonald
Preceded by Daniel J. Murphy	Commander-in-Chief, United States Sixth Fleet; September 1974 – August 1976	Succeeded by Harry D. Train II
