= Isaac S. Morse =

American lawyer and politician (1817–1896)

District Attorney of Middlesex County, Massachusetts
- In office 1855–1872
- Preceded by: Charles R. Train
- Succeeded by: John B. Goodrich

Personal details
- Born: December 27, 1817 Haverhill, New Hampshire, U.S.
- Died: December 27, 1896 (aged 60) Boston, Massachusetts, U.S.
- Resting place: Lowell Cemetery; Lowell, Massachusetts
- Party: Republican
- Spouse: Eloise La Barte (1844–1882; her death)
- Occupation: Lawyer

Isaac Stevens Morse (December 27, 1817 – December 27, 1896) was an American lawyer and politician who served as district attorney of Middlesex County, Massachusetts from 1855 to 1872.

== Early life and legal career ==
Morse was born on December 27, 1817, in Haverhill, New Hampshire. His parents were Rev. Bryant and Susannah (Stevens) Morse. He studied law in the office of Elisha Fuller in Lowell, Massachusetts and at Harvard Law School and was admitted to the bar in on September 25, 1840. On September 25, 1844, he married Eloise La Barte in Groton, Massachusetts. Morse was a partner of the firm Morse & Lawrence with George P. Lawrence and from 1877 to 1881 was associated with Richard James McKelleget.

== Public office ==
From 1850 to 1852, Morse was the city solicitor of Lowell, Massachusetts. From 1855 to 1872, he was the district attorney of Middlesex County. In 1866 he was a member of the Massachusetts House of Representatives. He was a member of the Cambridge, Massachusetts board of aldermen in 1873.

== Death ==
Morse died on December 27, 1896, in Boston. He was buried in the family plot in the Lowell Cemetery.
