= John Wilkes Hammond =

Politician in Massachusetts, US (1837–1922)

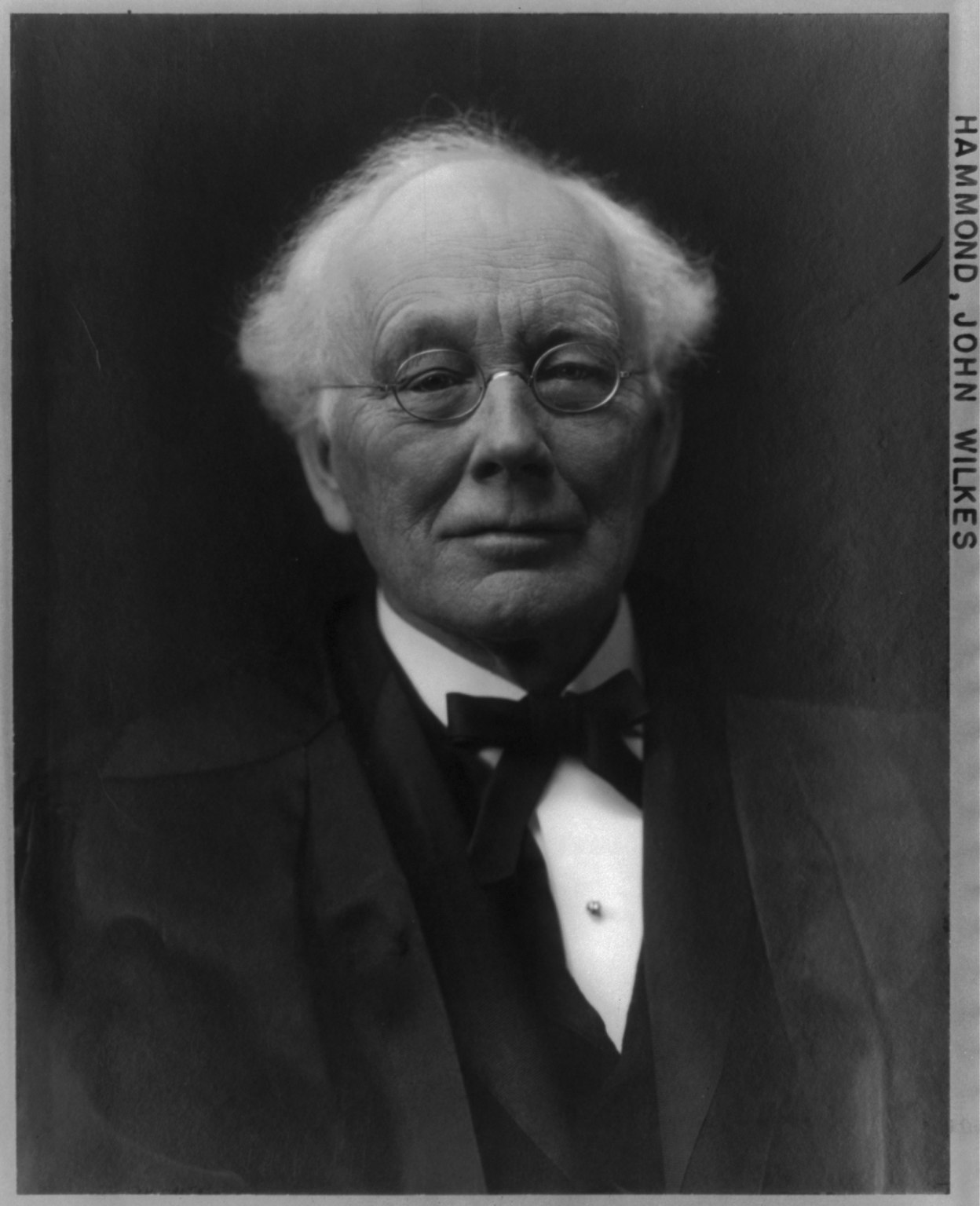
- Born: December 16, 1837; Mattapoisett, Massachusetts, U.S.
- Died: March 26, 1922 (aged 84); Cambridge, Massachusetts, U.S.
- Education: Tufts College
- Known for: Associate Justice of the Massachusetts Supreme Judicial Court
- Political party: Republican
- Spouse: Clara Ellen Tweed (1866–1902; her death)
- Children: 3 (Franklin Tweed; Clara Maria; John Wilkes III)
- Parent(s): Maria Louise (Southwick) and John Wilkes Hammond Sr.

John Wilkes Hammond (December 16, 1837 – March 26, 1922) was an American jurist who served as an associate justice of the Massachusetts Supreme Judicial Court from 1898 to 1914.

== Early life ==
Hammond was born to Maria Louise (Southwick) and John Wilkes Hammond Sr. in Mattapoisett (then part of Rochester, Massachusetts) on December 16, 1837. He graduated from Tufts College in 1861 and began teaching. He taught in Stoughton, Massachusetts for one year, then spent a brief time in Tisbury, Massachusetts before joining the Union Army. He enlisted in the 3rd Massachusetts Militia Regiment for a term of nine months. His enlistment ended in June 1863 and he resumed his teaching career in Wakefield, Massachusetts. In 1865 he was principal Melrose High School. In 1866 he married Clara Ellen Tweed, daughter of Tufts professor Benjamin Franklin Tweed and his wife, Clara Foster Tweed.

== Legal career ==
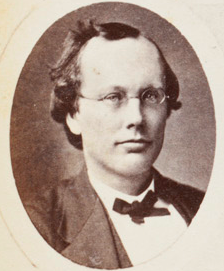
Hammond as a member of the Massachusetts of House Representatives

In the fall of 1864, Hammond began studying law in the office of Sweetser & Gardner. He attended Harvard Law School for a year, earning a LL.B in 1865, and was admitted to the bar in 1866. He opened a practice in Cambridge, Massachusetts and served on the city's common council and school committee. He represented the 7th Middlesex district in the Massachusetts House of Representatives from 1872 to 1873 and from 1873 to 1886 was Cambridge's city solicitor. From 1879 to 1880 he also served as district attorney for Middlesex County, Massachusetts.

On March 10, 1886, he was appointed to the Massachusetts Superior Court. On September 7, 1898, he was elevated to the Massachusetts Supreme Judicial Court by Governor Roger Wolcott. He resigned from the bench on December 1, 1914, and died on March 26, 1922, after several years of illness.

Political offices
Preceded by George Stevens	District attorney of Middlesex County, Massachusetts; 1879–1880	Succeeded by William Burnham Stevens
Preceded by Charles Allen	Associate Justice of the Massachusetts Supreme Judicial Court; 1898–1914	Succeeded by Edward Pierce
