= Edward Pierce (Massachusetts judge) =

American judge (1852–1938)

Edward Peter Pierce (December 28, 1852 – June 22, 1938) was a justice of the Massachusetts Supreme Judicial Court from 1914 to 1937. He was appointed by Governor David I. Walsh.

Born in Templeton, Massachusetts, Pierce attended the public schools of Fitchburg, Massachusetts, where he lived with his uncle. He studied at Harvard College for two years before transferring to Harvard Law School, from which he graduated with an LL.B. in 1877. He served as Fitchburg city solicitor, and was a member and secretary of the Board of Bar Examiners from 1897 to 1900, when Governor Winthrop M. Crane appointed Pierce to a seat on the Massachusetts Superior Court. In 1914, Governor David I. Walsh elevated Pierce to the state supreme court, where Pierce remained for over twenty years.

Pierce died in Brookline, Massachusetts, at age 85, following "an illness of several weeks".

Political offices
Preceded by John Hammond	Justice of the Massachusetts Supreme Judicial Court; 1914–1937	Succeeded by Louis Cox
