= War Cross of Military Valor =

Italian military order

War Cross for Military Valor Croce di Guerra al Valor Militare
- War Cross for Military Valor

Awarded by the Italian Republic
- Type: Order of chivalry
- Established: 7 January 1922; 103 years ago
- Country: Italy
- Eligibility: Members of the Italian armed forces
- Criteria: Military valor in time of war
- Status: Dormant
- Grand Master: President of the Republic
- Chancellor: Minister of Defence
- Grades: Gold Medal; Silver Medal; Bronze Medal
- Website: www.quirinale.it/page/medagliacrocevm

Precedence
- Next (higher): Order of Vittorio Veneto
- Next (lower): Award for Civil Valor
- Ribbon bar of the cross

The War Cross for Military Valor (Italian: Croce di Guerra al Valor Militare) is an Italian order for military valor. Established in 1922, the cross may be awarded only in time of war.

== Appearance ==
The medal is a Greek cross made of copper. Inscribed on the horizontal arms is Al Valore Militare (For Military Valor). On the top arm of the cross is the monogram of the Italian Republic. The bottom arm depicts a Roman sword sheathed in bay leaves. The back of the cross depicts a five-pointed star, with rays radiating from behind that star out to the arms of the cross. The cross is suspended from a solid blue ribbon.

== Notable recipients ==
- Prince Aimone, Duke of Aosta
- Vernon Baker; Second Lieutenant, U.S. Army, MoH
- Heinrich Bleichrodt; German Kriegsmarine
- Gaetano Costa; Regia Aeronautica
- Douglas Fairbanks Jr, U.S. Navy
- Carlo Fecia di Cossato; Commander, Regia Marina
- Hamilton H. Howze; General, U.S. Army
- Edgar Erskine Hume; Major General, U.S. Army
- Clayton P. Kerr; Major General, U.S. Army
- Wolfgang Lüth; German Kriegsmarine
- Enrico Martini; Italian Lieutenant Colonel
- Billy Mitchell; Brigadier General, U.S. Army
- Kaoru Moto; Pfc, US Army, MoH
- Charles R. Train; WWI, U.S. Navy
