= Charles Allen (jurist) =

American judge

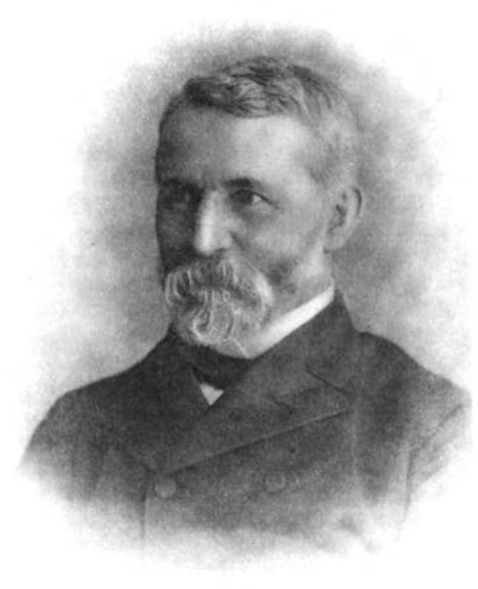

Associate Justice of the Massachusetts Supreme Judicial Court
- In office 1882–1898
- Nominated by: John D. Long
- Preceded by: Marcus Morton
- Succeeded by: John Wilkes Hammond, Jr.

Massachusetts Attorney General
- In office 1867–1872
- Governor: Chester I. Reed; Charles R. Train
- Preceded by: Chester I. Reed
- Succeeded by: Charles R. Train
- Majority: 34,164 (1867); 48,991 (1868); 47,549 (1870)

Personal details
- Born: April 17, 1827 Greenfield, Massachusetts, U.S.
- Died: January 13, 1913 (aged 85) Boston, Massachusetts, U.S.
- Party: Republican
- Education: Harvard University
- Profession: Attorney

Charles Allen (April 17, 1827 – January 13, 1913) was an American jurist.

== Early life and education ==
Allen was born at Greenfield, Massachusetts to Sylvester and Harriet (Ripley) Allen. Allen graduated from Harvard University in 1847 and studied law. He received the degree of LL.D. from Harvard in 1892.

== Legal career ==
Allen was admitted to the bar in 1850 and practiced law at Greenfield for twelve years, then advanced to state offices, serving as the Massachusetts Attorney General from 1867 to 1872. During his sixteen years of service (1882–1898) on the bench of the Massachusetts Supreme Judicial Court, he became known as one of the most eminent jurists of his day.

== Works ==
Allen's publications include:

- Allen's Reports (14 vols., 1861–1867)
- Telegraph Cases (1900)
- Notes on the Bacon-Shakespeare Question (1900)

== Notes ==
Legal offices
Preceded by Chester I. Reed	Attorney General of Massachusetts; 1867 – 1872	Succeeded by Charles R. Train
Preceded by Marcus Morton	Associate Justice of the Massachusetts Supreme Judicial Court; 1882 – 1898	Succeeded by John Wilkes Hammond
