= United States Commission on National Security/21st Century =

Security commission

The United States Commission on National Security/21st Century (USCNS/21), also known as the Hart-Rudman Commission or Hart-Rudman Task Force on Homeland Security, was chartered by Secretary of Defense William Cohen in 1998 to provide a comprehensive review of US national security requirements in the 21st century. USCNS/21 was tasked "to analyze the emerging international security environment; to develop a US national security strategy appropriate to that environment; and to assess the various security institutions for their current relevance to the effective and efficient implementation of that strategy, and to recommend adjustments as necessary".

Released on 31 January 2001, USCNS/21 was the most exhaustive review of US national security strategy since the National Security Act of 1947. USCNS/21 was released in three distinct phases. The first phase, New World Coming: American Security in the 21st Century (see further below), anticipates the emerging international security environment within the first quarter of the 21st century and examines how the US fits into that environment. The second phase, Seeking a National Strategy: A Concert for Preserving Security and Promoting Freedom (see further below), proposes a new US national security strategy based on the anticipated threats and conditions outlined in the first phase report. The third phase, Roadmap for National Security: Imperative for Change (see further below), recommends changes to the US government's structure, legislation, and policy to reflect a new national security strategy based on the anticipated 21st century international security environment.

== Mandate and members ==
=== Charter ===
According to the US Commission on National Security/21st Century Charter:

The Department of Defense recognizes that America should advance its position as a strong, secure, and persuasive force for freedom and progress in the world. Consequently, there is a requirement to:

- conduct a comprehensive review of the early 21st century global security environment, including likely trends and potential 'wild cards';
- develop a comprehensive overview of American strategic interests and objectives for the security environment we will likely encounter in the 21st century;
- delineate a national security strategy appropriate to that environment and the nation's character;
- identify a range of alternatives to implement the national security strategy, by defining the security goals for American society, and by describing the internal and external policy instruments required to apply American resources in the 21st century; and
- develop a detailed plan to implement the range of alternatives by describing the sequence of measures necessary to attain the national security strategy, to include recommending concomitant changes to the national security apparatus as necessary.

A Commission, the U.S. Commission on National Security/21st Century (USCNS/21), will be established to fulfill this requirement, supported by a Study Group. Two individuals who have national recognition and significant depth of experience and public service will oversee the efforts of this Commission and serve as its Co-chairpersons. The study effort shall be conducted by a Study Group, composed of individuals who will be appointed as Department of Defense personnel. Based on the results of this study and the Commission's consideration thereof, the USCNS/21 will advance practical recommendations that the President of the United States, with the support of the Congress, could begin to implement in the Fiscal Year 2002 budget, if desired.

=== The Commission ===
==== Co-Chairs ====
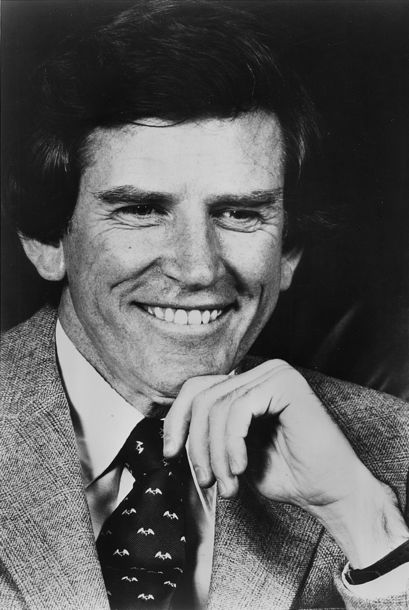
Gary Hart

- Gary Hart

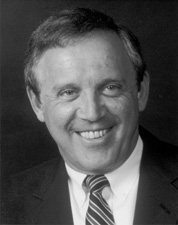
Warren Rudman

- Warren Bruce Rudman

==== Commissioners ====
- Anne Armstrong
- Norm R. Augustine
- John Dancy
- John R. Galvin
- Leslie H. Gelb
- Newt Gingrich
- Lee H. Hamilton
- Lionel H. Olmer
- Donald B. Rice
- James R. Schlesinger
- Harry D. Train II
- Andrew Jackson Young, Jr.

==== Executive Director ====
- Charles G. Boyd

==== Deputy Executive Director ====
- Arnold L. Punaro

==== Chief of Staff ====
- Hank Scharpenberg

==== Study Group Coordinator and Study Group Member ====
- Dr. Pat Pentland

==== Study Group Members ====
- Dr. Jeffrey Bergner
- Dr. Coit D. Blacker
- Dr. Christopher J. Bowie
- Dr. Ivo H. Daalder
- Rhett Dawson
- Amb. Charles W. Freeman, Jr.
- Dr. Adam Garfinkle
- Richard Haass
- Keith Hahn
- Dr. Charles B. Johnson
- Robert Killebrew
- Dr. Richard H. Kohn
- Dr. William Lewis
- James R. Locher III
- Dr. Charles Moskos
- Dr. Williamson Murray
- Dr. Barry Ross Posen
- Dr. Barbara Samuels
- Dr. James S. Thomason
- Ruth Wedgwood
- Francis G. Hoffman

== Phase I report – New World Coming: American Security in the 21st Century ==
New World Coming: American Security in the 21st Century was the first report completed by the Commission. Released on 15 September 1999, it attempts to provide a picture of the international security environment within the first quarter of the 21st century and the anticipated role of the US in that environment. The Commission anticipates an increasingly technologically, economically, and socially integrated world, i.e. increasing globalization amidst social and political fragmentation. The report provides twelve basic assumptions of that environment and fourteen conclusions based on those assumptions.

=== Assumptions ===
- An economically strong United States is likely to remain a primary political, military, and cultural force through 2025, and will thus have a significant role in shaping the international environment.
- The stability and direction of American society and politics will help shape US foreign policy goals and capacities, and hence the way the US may affect the global future.
- Science and technology will continue to advance and become more widely available and utilized around the world, but their benefits will be less evenly distributed.
- World energy supplies will remain largely based on fossil fuels.
- While much of the world will experience economic growth, disparities in income will increase and widespread poverty will persist.
- The international aspects of business and commerce (trade, transportation, telecommunications, investment and finance, manufacturing, and professional services) will continue to expand.
- Non-governmental organizations (refugee aid organizations, religious and ethnic advocacy groups, environmental and other single-issue lobbies, international professional associations, and others) will continue to grow in importance, numbers, and in their international role.
- Though it will raise important issues of sovereignty, the US will find in its national interest to work with and strengthen a variety of international organizations.
- The US will remain the principal military power in the world.
- Weapons of mass destruction (nuclear, chemical, and biological) and weapons of mass disruption (information warfare) will continue to proliferate to a wider range of state and non-state actors. Maintenance of a robust nuclear deterrent therefore remains essential as well as investment in new forms of defense against these threats.
- We should expect conflicts in which adversaries, because of cultural affinities different from our own, will resort to forms and levels of violence shocking to our sensibilities.
- As the US confronts a variety of complex threats, it will often be dependent on allies; but it will find reliable alliances more difficult to establish and sustain.

=== Conclusions ===
- America will become increasingly vulnerable to hostile attack on our homeland, and our military superiority will not help us.
- Rapid advances in information and biotechnologies will create new vulnerabilities for US security.
- New technologies will divide the world as well as draw it together.
- The national security of all advanced states will be increasingly affected by the vulnerabilities of the evolving global economic infrastructure.
- Energy will continue to have major strategic significance.
- All borders will be more porous; some will bend and some will break.
- The sovereignty of states will come under pressure, but will endure.
- Fragmentation or failure of states will occur, with destabilizing effects on neighboring states.
- Foreign crises will be replete with atrocities and the deliberate terrorizing of civilian populations.
- Space will become a critical and competitive military environment.
- The essence of war will not change.
- US intelligence will face more challenging adversaries, and even excellent intelligence will not prevent all surprises.
- The US will be called upon frequently to intervene militarily in a time of uncertain alliances and with the prospect of fewer forward deployed forces.
- The emerging security environment in the next quarter century will require different military and other national capabilities.

== Phase II report – Seeking a National Strategy: A Concert for Preserving Security and Promoting Freedom ==
Released on 15 April 2000, Seeking a National Strategy: A Concert for Preserving Security and Promoting Freedom proposes a new national security strategy based on the anticipated 21st century international security environment. The new strategy must consider how to minimize the potential destabilizing effects of the contradictory trends of globalization and political fragmentation while promoting US interests and values worldwide.

=== Strategic considerations ===
In developing this new strategy, the Commission suggests a number of strategic considerations:

- Strategy and policy must be grounded in the national interest.
- The maintenance of America's strength is a long-term commitment and cannot be assured without conscious, dedicated effort.
- The US faces unprecedented opportunities as well as dangers in the new era.
- The US must find new ways to join with other capable and like-minded nations.
- This nation must set priorities and apply them consistently.
- America must never forget that it stands for certain principles, most importantly freedom under the rule of law.

=== Suggested categorization of US national interests ===
Building on these considerations, the Commission suggests categorizing US national interests into three categories: survival, critical, and significant. Survival interests are defined as, "without which America would cease to exist as we know it". These interests encompass safety from direct attacks by hostile states and terrorists through the use of weapons of mass destruction. They also include preserving America's founding principles as outlined in the US Constitution. Critical interests are defined as, "causally one step removed from survival interests". These interests lie in the continuation of key global systems, such as global energy, economic, communications, transportation, and health infrastructures. Other critical interests include the security of US allies and preventing potentially hostile alliances from being formed to threaten US national security. Significant interests, "importantly affect the global environment in which the US must act". These interests include spreading democracy abroad and ensuring basic human rights for all the world's citizens.

=== Priority objectives ===
Using these strategic considerations as a foundation, the Commission recommends the following as the priority objectives to the new national security strategy:

- "Defend the US and ensure that it is safe from the dangers of a new era". The proliferation of weapons of mass destruction and terrorism will be the gravest threat to US national security in the 21st century. These threats must be taken seriously and the highest priority must be given to prevention and deterrence from such attacks.
- "Maintain social cohesion, economic competitiveness, technological ingenuity, and military strength". The US must re-focus on education, specifically in the sciences, to ensure its technological dominance in the 21st century. Furthermore, the US must reduce its dependence on fossil fuels and investigate other energy alternatives.
- "Assist the integration of key major powers, especially China, Russia, and India, into the mainstream of the emerging international system". The US must engage emerging, and in Russia's case re-emerging, world powers and work to foster their integration into the world's economy. However, the US must not lose sight of its own interests. These relationships are especially important in relation to the US's effort to limiting nuclear proliferation; cooperation with these powers is absolutely necessary.
- "Promote, with others, the dynamism of the new global economy and improve the effectiveness of international institutions and international law". The US, along with the G7, must successfully manage the effects, both positive and negative, of globalization on the world stage.
- "Adapt US alliances and other regional mechanisms to a new era in which America's partners seek greater autonomy and responsibility". The US must maintain its current alliances and relationships with other nations as a mechanism to preserve and foster international peace and security.
- "Help the international community tame the disintegrative forces spawned by an era of change". The US must work with the international community to address and manage the problem of failed states.

== Phase III report – Roadmap for National Security: Imperative for Change ==
Released on 31 January 2001, Roadmap for National Security: Imperative for Change suggests "significant changes must be made in the structures and processes of the US national security apparatus". The Commission believes that without these reforms, "American power and influence cannot be sustained". Five key areas are highlighted for reform, followed by the Commissions specific recommendations for each area.

=== Recommendations ===
- ensuring the security of the American homeland
- recapitalizing America's strengths in science and education
- redesigning key institutions of the Executive Branch
- overhauling the US government personnel system
- reorganizing Congress's role in national security affairs

=== Securing the national homeland ===
The Commission believes that the combination of weapons proliferation and terrorism will result in increased vulnerability to the US homeland. "A direct attack against American citizens on American soil is likely over the next quarter century". In order protect the homeland against this threat, the Commission suggests:

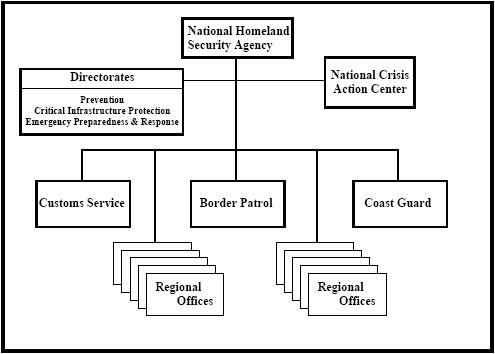
Structure of proposed National Homeland Security Agency, February 2001

- "the creation of a new independent National Homeland Security Agency (NHSA) with responsibility for planning, coordinating, and integrating various government activities involved in homeland security"
- "that a new office of Assistant Secretary for Homeland Security be created to oversee the various Department of Defense activities and ensure that the necessary resources are made available"
- "that the National Guard be given homeland security as a primary mission, as the US Constitution itself ordains"
- "that Congress reorganize itself to accommodate this Executive Branch realignment, and that it also form a special select committee for homeland security to provide Congressional support and oversight in this critical area"

=== Recapitalizing America's strengths in science and education ===
The Commission finds that the scientific and educational systems of the US are in "serious crisis". It notes how the US is in danger of lagging behind other countries in this arena. "In the next quarter century, we will likely see ourselves surpassed, and in relative decline, unless we make a conscious national commitment to maintain our edge". The report further highlights the Commission's belief that this decline in emphasis on science and education is the gravest threat to US national security, even over weapons proliferation and terrorism. The Commission recommends:

- "doubling the federal research and development budget by 2010, and instituting a more competitive environment for the allotment of those funds"
- "that the role of the President's Science Advisor be elevated to oversee these and other critical tasks, such as the resuscitation of the national laboratory system and the institution of better inventory stewardship over the nation's science and technology assets"
- "a new National Security Science and Technology Education Act to fund a comprehensive program to produce the needed numbers of science and engineering professionals as well as qualified teachers in science and math"

=== Institutional redesign ===
The Commission finds that the US government has failed to restructure itself to the post–Cold War world. It recommends significant restructuring to re-align government offices, branches, and procedures with the global realities of the 21st century as well as ensure that,"strategy once again drives the design and implementation of US national security policies". The Commission urges Congress to expand its understanding of national security matters, and streamline the appropriations and authorizations committees to make intelligence and security related legislation more efficient and effective. The Commission also recommends:

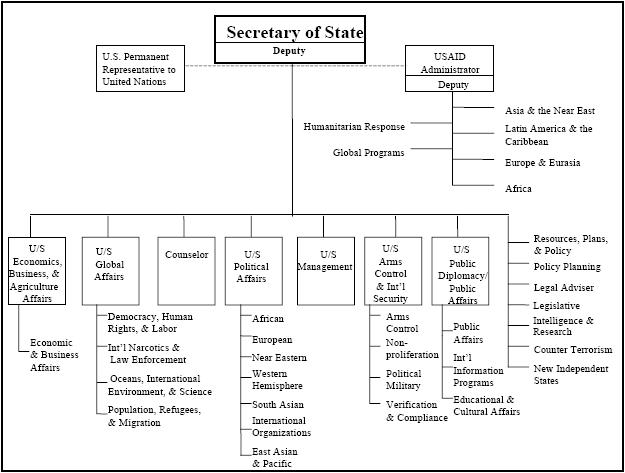
Structure of the Department of State, February 2001

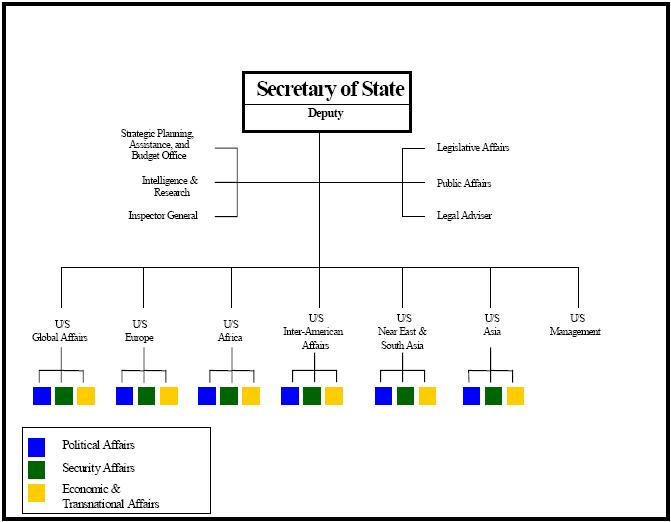
Proposed restructuring of the Department of State, February 2001

- that "the President personally guide a top-down strategic planning process and that process should be linked to the allocation of resources throughout the government"
- that "legislative, press communications, and speech-writing functions should reside in the White House staff, not separately in the National Security Council staff as they do today"
- "that the Secretary of the Treasury be named a statutory member of the National Security Council"
- that "the President should abolish the National Economic Council, distributing its domestic economic policy responsibilities to the Domestic Policy Council"
- "the creation of five Under Secretaries with the responsibility for overseeing the regions of Africa, Asia, Europe, Inter-America, and Near East/South Asia, and a redefinition of the responsibilities of the Under Secretary for Global Affairs"
- "that the activities of the US Agency for International Development be fully integrated into this new State Department organization"
- "that the new Secretary of Defense reduce by ten to fifteen percent the staffs of the Office of the Secretary of Defense, the Joint Staff, the military services, and the regional commands"
- that "the Secretary of Defense should establish a ten-year goal of reducing infrastructure costs by 20-25 percent through steps to consolidate, restructure, outsource, and privatize many Department of Defense support agencies and activities as possible"
- that "the Secretary of Defense should move the Quadrennial Defense Review to the second year of a Presidential term"
- "that the Secretary of Defense introduce a new process that requires the Services and defense agencies to compete for the allocation of some resources within the overall defense budget"
- "establishing and employing a two-track acquisition system, one for major acquisitions and a 'fast track' for a modest number of potential breakthrough systems, especially those in the area of command and control"
- that "the Secretary of Defense should direct the Department of Defense to shift from the threat-based, force sizing process to one which measure requirements against recent operational activity trends, actual intelligence estimates of potential adversaries' capabilities, and national security objectives as defined in the new administration's national security strategy - once formulated"
- "that the Defense Department devote its highest priority to improving and further developing its expeditionary capabilities"
- "the establishment of an Interagency Working Group on Space (IWGS)"
- "that the intelligence community should emphasize the recruitment of human intelligence sources on terrorism as one of the intelligence community's highest priorities" and "the community should place new emphasis on collection and analysis of economic and science/technology security concerns, and incorporate more open source intelligence into its analytical products"

== See also ==
- Federal government of the United States
- United States Department of Homeland Security
- United States Intelligence Community
- National Intelligence Strategy of the United States of America
- Intelligence cycle management
- Homeland security
- USA PATRIOT Act
- Partnership for a Secure America
