= George Stevens (Massachusetts politician) =

American lawyer and politician (1824–1884)

District Attorney of Middlesex County, Massachusetts
- In office 1874–1879
- Preceded by: John B. Goodrich
- Succeeded by: John Wilkes Hammond

Personal details
- Born: October 23, 1824 Stoddard, New Hampshire, U.S.
- Died: June 6, 1884 (aged 59) Lowell, Massachusetts, U.S.
- Party: Republican
- Spouse: Elizabeth Rachel Kimball (1850–1884; his death)
- Education: Dartmouth College
- Occupation: Lawyer

George Stevens (October 23, 1824 – June 6, 1884) was an American politician and lawyer who held office in Lowell, Massachusetts.

== Early life ==
Stevens was born in Stoddard, New Hampshire, on October 23, 1824. He was the eighth of twelve children born to Daniel and Tabitha (Sawyer) Stevens. Daniel Stevens died when George was young, and the family moved to Hancock, New Hampshire, when he was twelve. He attended the Hancock and Phillips academies and graduated from Dartmouth College in 1849. He taught at the Gilmanton Academy from 1849 to 1850, the Pittsfield Academy from 1850 to 1851, and the Mount Vernon Academy from 1851 to 1854.

On September 19, 1850, he married Elizabeth Rachel Kimball of Littleton, Massachusetts. They had thee children: George Hunter, Elizabeth Harris, and Mary Greenleaf Stevens. George Hunter Stevens followed his father into the legal profession and became his law partner.

== Career ==
Stevens studied law in the offices of Ira Allen Eastman of Gilmanton, New Hampshire, Moses Norris Jr. of Pittsfield, New Hampshire, and Daniel Samuel & William Adams Richardson of Lowell, Massachusetts. In October 1854, Stevens began practicing law in Lowell.

Stevens was clerk of the Lowell police court in 1857, represented the 24th Middlesex district in the Massachusetts House of Representatives in 1858, was a justice of the Lowell police court from 1859 to 1874, was Lowell's city solicitor from 1867 to 1868, and was a member of the city's board of aldermen from 1873 to 1874. From 1874 to 1879 he was district attorney of Middlesex County, Massachusetts. He died in Lowell on June 6, 1884.
