= Chester I. Reed =

American politician

Hon. Chester Isham Reed
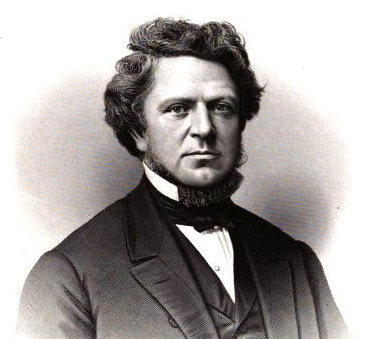

Associate Justice of the Massachusetts Superior Court
- In office 1867–1871
- Appointed by: Alexander H. Bullock
- Preceded by: Thomas Russell
- Succeeded by: John William Bacon

Massachusetts Attorney General
- In office 1864 – April 20, 1867
- Governor: John Albion Andrew; William Claflin
- Preceded by: Dwight Foster
- Succeeded by: Charles Allen

Member of the Massachusetts Senate North Bristol District
- In office 1859–1859
- In office 1862–1862

Member of the Massachusetts House of Representatives Bristol District
- In office 1849–1849

Personal details
- Born: November 23, 1823 Taunton, Massachusetts, U.S.
- Died: September 2, 1873 (aged 49) White Sulphur Springs, West Virginia, U.S.
- Party: Republican
- Spouse(s): Elizabeth Y. Allyn, m. February 24, 1851.
- Children: Sybil Reed; Chester Allyn Reed
- Education: Taunton High School; Bristol Academy; Brown University
- Profession: Attorney

Chester Isham Reed (November 23, 1823 – September 2, 1873) was an American attorney who served in both branches of the Massachusetts legislature, as Attorney General of Massachusetts, and as an associate justice of the Massachusetts Superior Court.

== Early life ==
Reed was born to William and Elizabeth Deane (Dennis) Reed on November 23, 1823, in Taunton, Massachusetts.

== Education ==
Reed attended Taunton High School, Bristol Academy and Brown University. Because of his father's adverse circumstances Reed was forced to leave Brown University. Reed moved to Gardiner, Maine, to study law. After he completed his study of law, Reed moved back to Taunton

== Newspaper employment ==
After he moved back to Taunton, Massachusetts Reed was, for about a year, editor of the Old Colony Republican newspaper.

== Massachusetts Legislature ==
At the age of 26 Reed was elected to represent Taunton in the Massachusetts House of Representatives. Reed was in the Massachusetts Senate in 1858 and 1862. While in the Senate of 1862 Reed served on the Joint Standing Committees on Railways and Canals, and on the Subject of Apportioning the State into Congressional Districts.

== Marriage and children ==
On February 24, 1851, Reed married Elizabeth Y. Allyn of New Bedford, Massachusetts. The couple had two children, Sybil Reed, and Chester Allyn Reed.

== Law career ==
In 1848 Reed entered into a law partnership with Anselm Bassett. Reed practiced law in the firm of Bassett & Reed for the next 15 years.

== Public Service Career ==
In 1864 Reed was elected as a Republican to the office of the Massachusetts Attorney General. Reed serves as the Massachusetts Attorney General until 1867 when he was appointed as Associate Justice of the Massachusetts Superior Court.

Reed resigned from the Superior Court in 1870.

== Death ==
Reed died on September 2, 1873 in White Sulphur Springs, West Virginia, where he had gone to improve his health.

Legal offices
| Preceded by Thomas Russell | Associate Justice of the Massachusetts Superior Court; 1867–1871 | Succeeded by John William Bacon |
| Preceded by Dwight Foster | Attorney General of Massachusetts; 1864 – April 20, 1867 | Succeeded by Charles Allen |
Political offices
| Preceded by | Member of the Massachusetts Senate; 1859–1859 | Succeeded by |
| Preceded by | Member of the Massachusetts House of Representatives – | Succeeded by |
