= Elizabeth L. Train =

United States Navy Rear Admiral

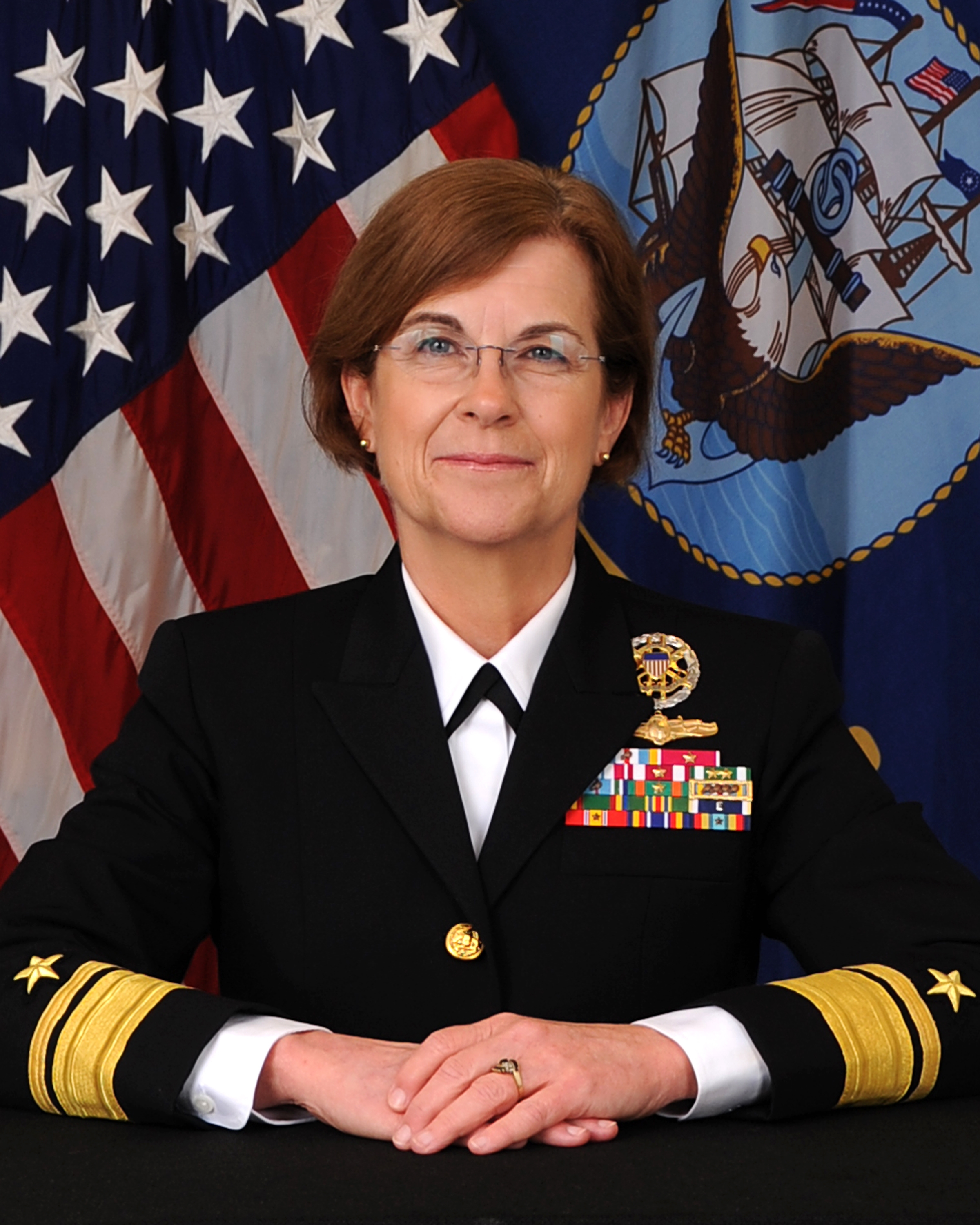
- Born: Elizabeth Langdon Train; 1955 (age 70–71); Honolulu, Territory of Hawaii
- Relatives: Admiral Harry D. Train II (father); Rear Admiral Harold C. Train (grandfather)
- Military career
- Allegiance: United States
- Branch: United States Navy
- Service years: 1983–2016
- Rank: Rear Admiral
- Commands: Office of Naval Intelligence; National Maritime Intelligence-Integration Office; Center for Naval Intelligence/Navy and Marine Corps Intelligence Center
- Awards: Defense Superior Service Medal (2); Legion of Merit (2)

Elizabeth Langdon Train (born 1955) is a retired United States Navy rear admiral who was the Commander, Office of Naval Intelligence and the Director, National Maritime Intelligence-Integration Office. Train is a third generation naval officer, her father is Admiral Harry D. Train II and her grandfather is Rear Admiral Harold C. Train.

== Early life ==
Train was born in Honolulu, Hawaii and grew up in Virginia and Washington D.C. Her father, Harry D. Train II was a career naval officer who reached the rank of admiral and, prior to retirement, was the Commander-in-Chief, United States Atlantic Fleet, United States Atlantic Command and SACLANT. She is a graduate of the College of William and Mary. After graduating, Train received her commission through Officer Candidate School.

== Education ==
In addition to her undergraduate studies, Train has a Master of Science in National Security Strategy from the National War College, and a Master of Science in Strategic Intelligence from the National Intelligence University.

== Career ==
Following her retirement from military service, Train was named the Chief Operations Officer for Team Rubicon Global, a veteran-led disaster response organization.

== Awards and decorations ==
Train is the recipient of the following:

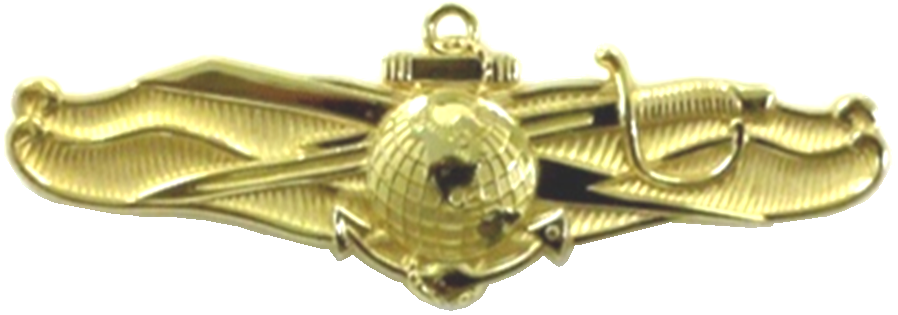
| Information Dominance Warfare Officer Badge |

| Defense Superior Service Medal (with one bronze oak leaf cluster) |
| Legion of Merit (with one gold award star) |
| Defense Meritorious Service Medal |
| Meritorious Service Medal (with one gold award star) |

Military offices
| Preceded by Michael S. Rogers | Director of Intelligence of the Joint Staff; 2011–2013 | Succeeded by Paul Becker |
