= Attack Squadron 1L =

Attack Squadron ONE L (VA-1L)
- Active: 19 March 1945 – 20 November 1948
- Country: United States
- Branch: United States Navy
- Role: Operational test and development
- Size: Squadron
- Home Port: NAAS Fentress; NAS Atlantic City
- Aircraft: TBM-3 Avenger

Attack Squadron ONE L (VA-1L) was a United States Navy squadron used to evaluate weapons and equipment and develop new tactics for the fleet under command of Light Carrier Air Group One (CVLG-1) aboard the USS Saipan (CVL-48). Originally established as Torpedo Squadron FIFTY EIGHT (VT-58) on 19 March 1946 at Naval Auxiliary Air Station Fentress in Chesapeake, Virginia, it was redesignated VA-1L on 15 November 1946 and ultimately disestablished on 20 November 1948. The squadron was the only one to receive the designations VA-1L or VT-58.

== History ==
The squadron's mission, when established, was to work with the navy's Operational Development Force (COMOPDEVFOR). That organization's duties included the operational test and evaluation of new weapons, equipment and methods for use by the fleet; reporting the results; and recommending required training, operating procedures and tactical doctrine. To accomplish this mission, the squadron operated three different types: the F6F-5N Hellcat fighter aircraft, SB2C-5 Helldiver dive bomber and TBM-3 Avenger torpedo bomber, giving them a day and night capability. By the end of the year however, the fighter aircraft were transferred to the group's fighter unit, Fighter Squadron ONE L (VF-1L), and the now-redesignated attack squadron would focus on attack-oriented aircraft types for the duration of its establishment.

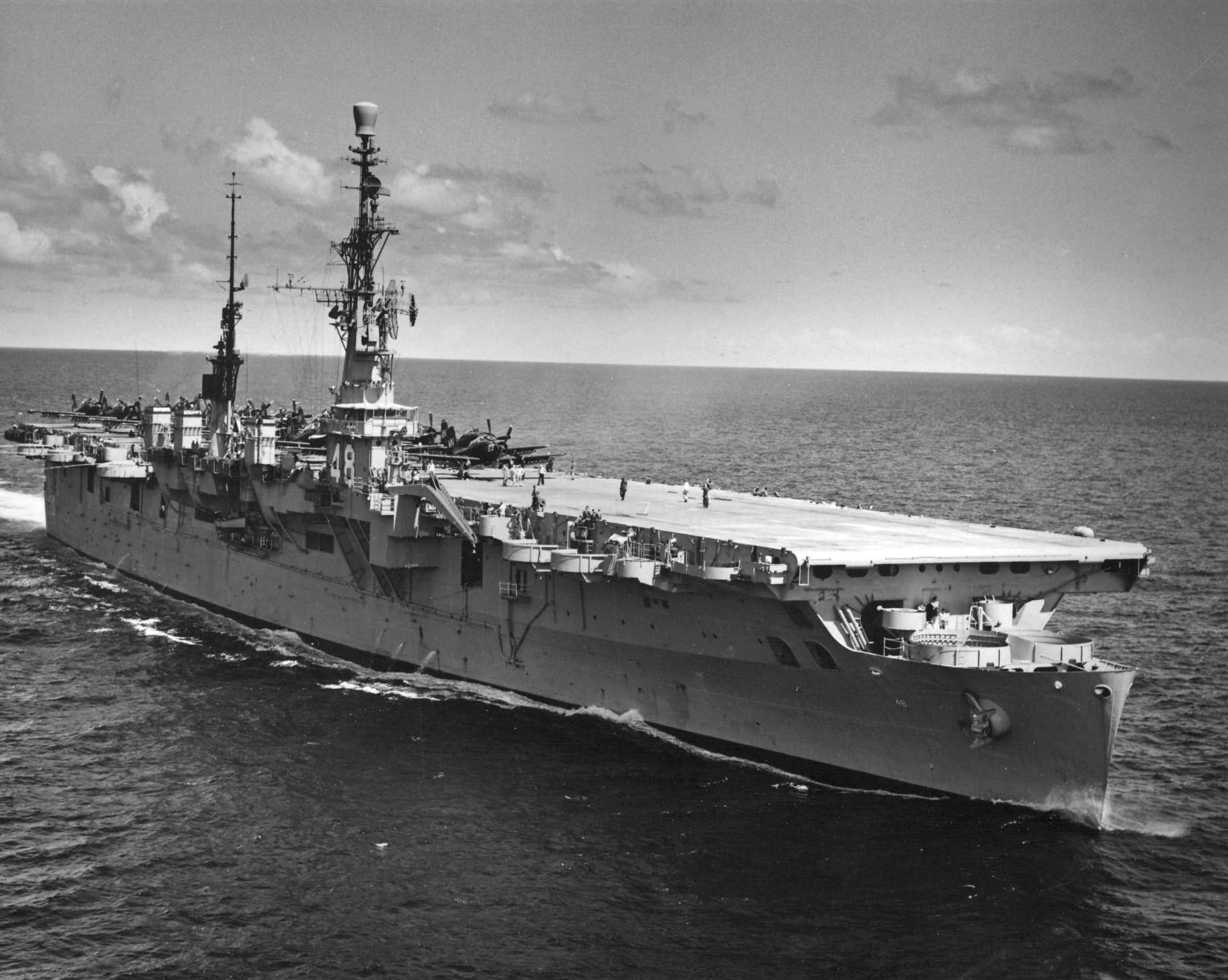
USS Saipan (CVL-48)

The squadron was moved to Naval Air Station Atlantic City on 19 June 1946 and when the squadron received the TBM-3W airborne early warning aircraft in March 1947, it also received qualified personnel to support and operate the AEW TBM. In April and May 1947, the squadron operated aboard USS Saipan (CVL-48) during her shakedown cruise in the Caribbean, and in February the following year, TBM-3N and TBM-3E aircraft were embarked for deployment in the Caribbean about Saipan again, during which squadron aircraft participated in a fly-over during the inauguration ceremonies in Caracas, Venezuela for President-elect Rómulo Gallegos. As part of Saipan's air wing CVLG-1, aircraft carried the tail code 'SA'. VA-1L became one of the first squadrons to receive the XBT2D-1, the initial prototype version of what would become better known as the Douglas A-1 Skyraider. Initial aircraft arrived in January 1948 and on 19 October, production examples of the aircraft (designated AD-2). However, the squadron was disestablished shortly thereafter on 20 November 1948 with elements of the squadron joining elements of VF-1L to form Aircraft Development Squadron 3 (VX-3) which would serve in a similar role for the next twelve years before ultimately being disestablished itself on 1 March 1960.

== Home port ==
VT-58 was initially established at Naval Auxiliary Air Station Fentress in Chesapeake, Virginia, but only remained there for three months. Naval Air Station Atlantic City in New Jersey became its new home on 19 June 1946 and it would remain there until its disestablishment in 1948.

== Commanding officers ==
Established under acting commander Lieutenant Dean S. Laird, little over a month would pass before the first commanding officer, Lieutenant Commander (LCDR) Samuel G. Parsons would assume command of the squadron. LCDR John W. Shong became commander of the squadron on 20 August 1946 and would be the unit's longest-serving commander, handing over the squadron on 13 June 1948 to LCDR Laurence W. Abbott Jr. who would see the squadron through to its disestablishment.

== Aircraft ==
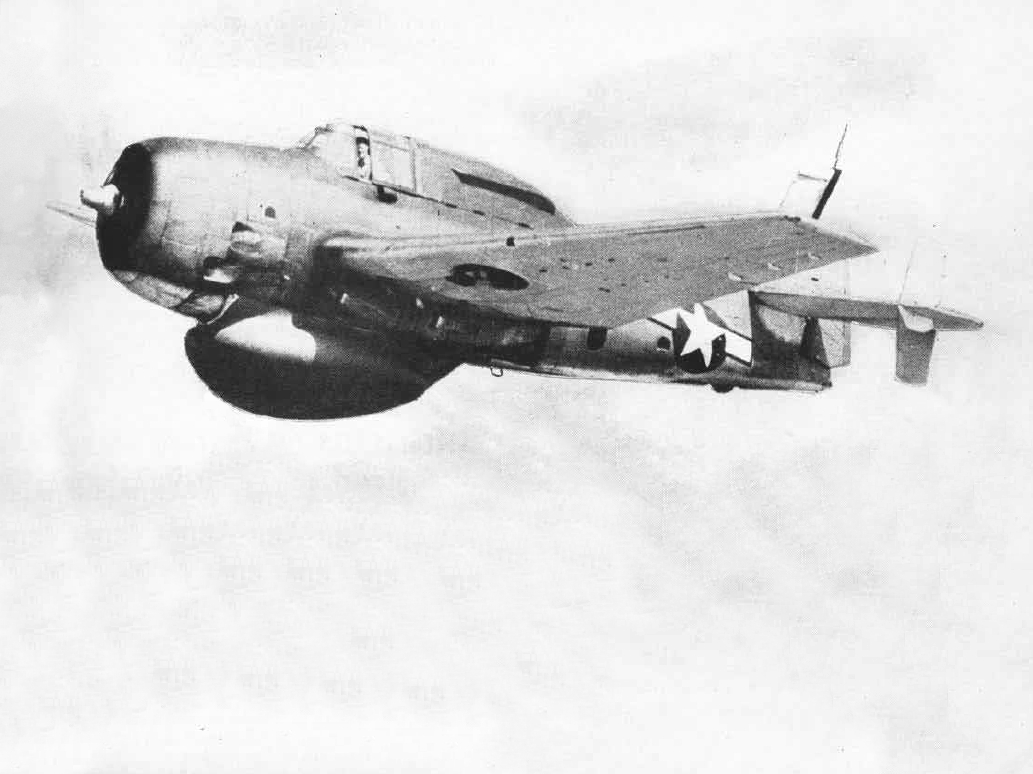
A Grumman TBM-3W Avenger, similar to those flown by VA-1L

- F6F-5N Hellcat from May through December 1946
- SB2C-5 Helldiver from May 1946
- TBM-3 Avenger from May 1946
- TBM-3E Avenger from May 1946
- TBM-3N Avenger from December 1946
- TBM-3W Avenger from 4 March 1947
- XBT2D-1 Skyraider from January 1948
- AD-2 Skyraider from 19 October 1948

== See also ==
- Attack aircraft
- Naval aviation
- List of inactive United States Navy aircraft squadrons
- List of United States Navy aircraft squadrons
- History of the United States Navy
