= VX-3 =

Air Development Squadron 3
- Active: 20 November 1948 – 1 March 1960
- Country: United States
- Branch: United States Navy

Air Development Squadron 3 or VX-3 was a United States Navy air test and evaluation squadron established on 20 November 1948 and disestablished on 1 March 1960.

== Operational history ==
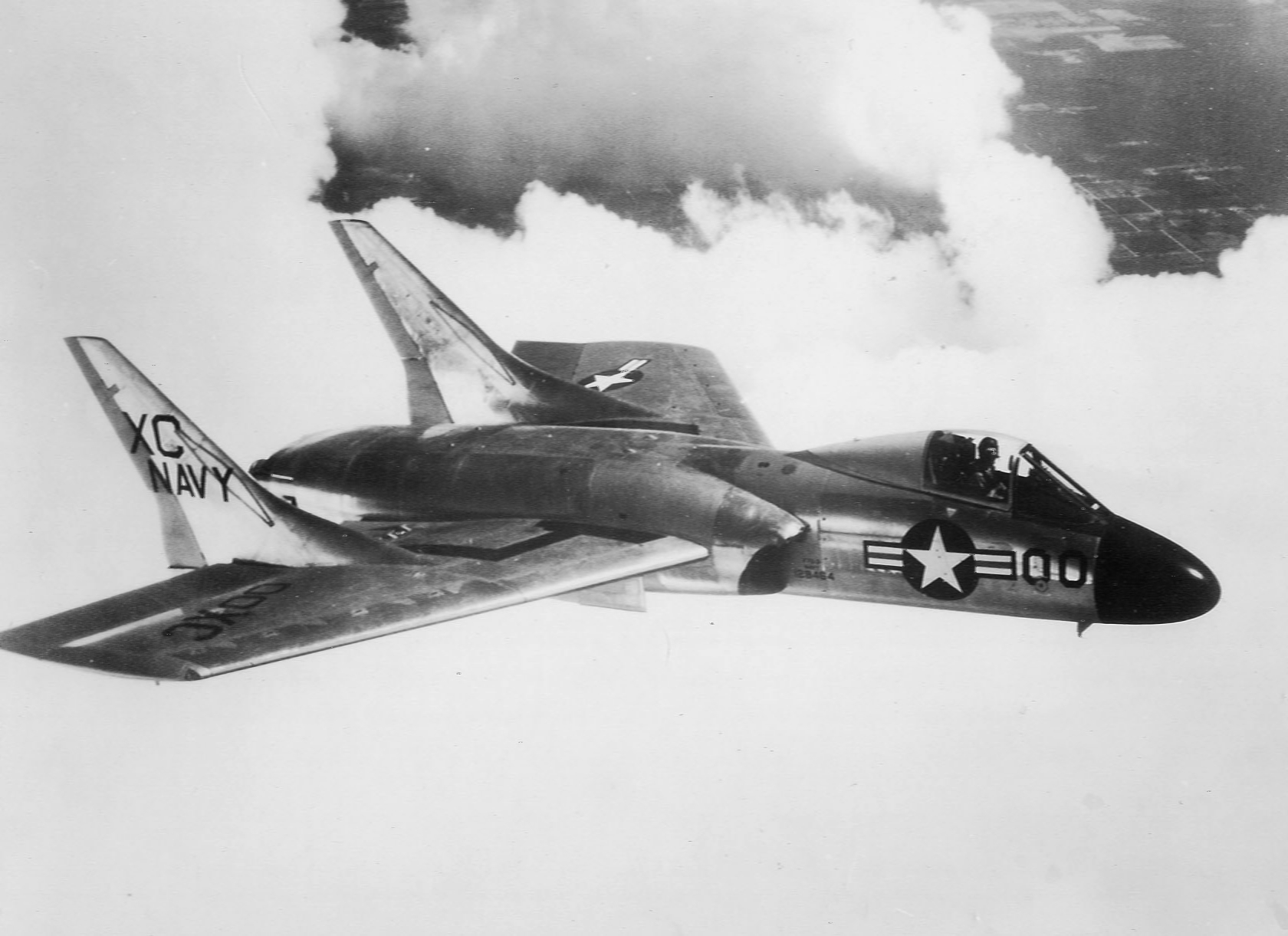
VX-3 F7U-3 c.1955

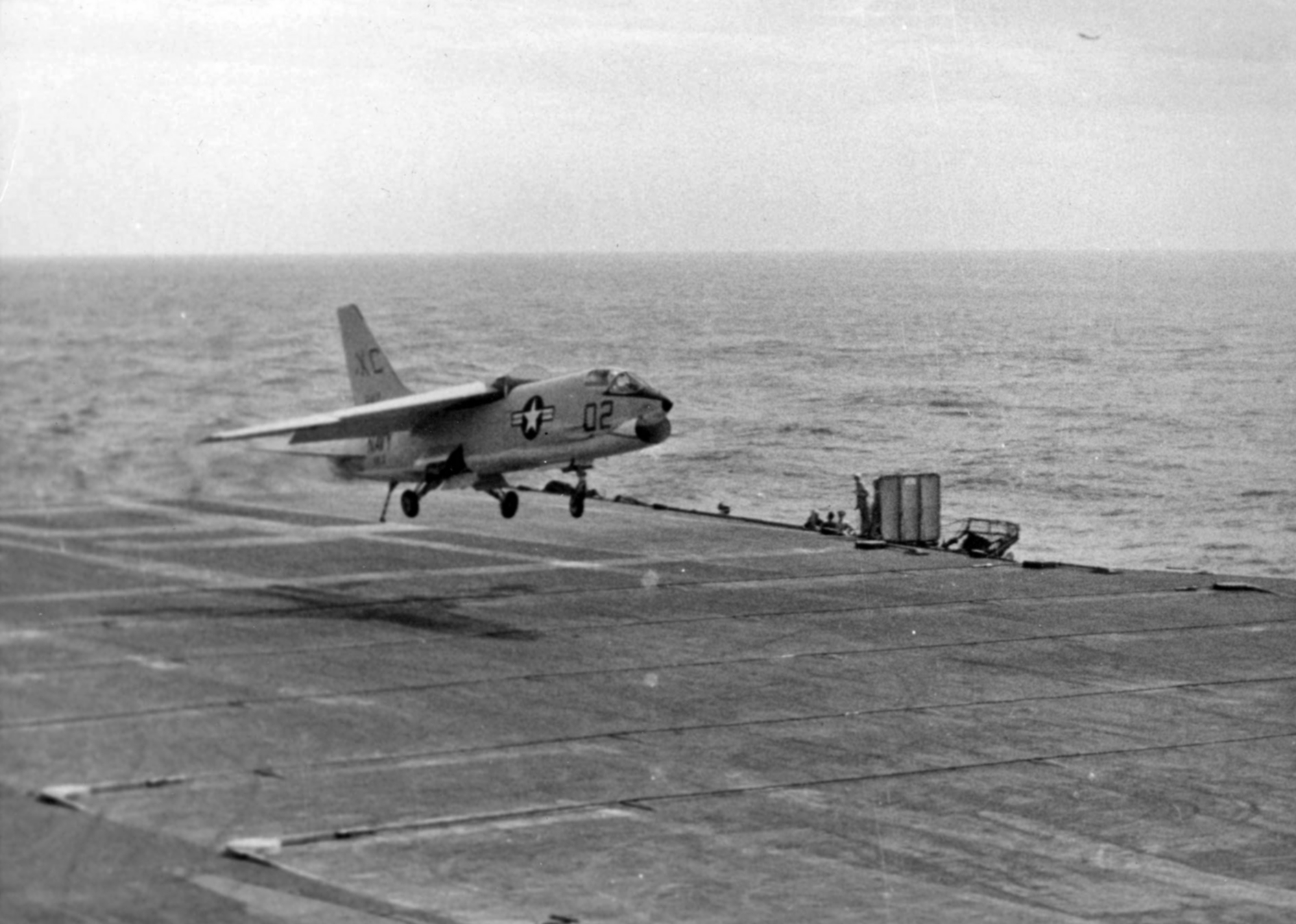
VX-3 F8U-1 lands on USS Saratoga c.1957

VX-3 was established by the merger of the assets of VA-1L and VF-1L and based at NAS Atlantic City, its aircraft carried the tail code "XC".

In late 1949 VX-3 received the F6U Pirate which it operated for a short period before sending them into storage at NAS Quonset Point.

In March 1953 VX-3 began operational trials of probe and drogue aerial refueling using AJ-1 Savage bombers.

In late 1954 VX-3 carrier-qualified the F9F-8 Cougar aboard the USS Midway.

In August 1955 VX-3 F9F-8s successfully tested the first mirror landing system aboard USS Bennington.

VX-3 received the first F8U-1 Crusaders in December 1956 and conducted carrier qualifications of the Crusader aboard the USS Franklin D. Roosevelt in April 1957. During testing of the Crusader two aircraft and pilots were lost. On 6 June 1957 a VX-3 Crusader set a US coast to coast speed record of three hours and twenty-eight minutes, launching from USS Bon Homme Richard on the West Coast and landing on USS Saratoga on the East Coast.

== Notable former members ==
- Thomas J. Hudner Jr.
- Donald D. Engen

Walter Starghill AT3

== See also ==
- History of the United States Navy
- List of inactive United States Navy aircraft squadrons
- List of United States Navy aircraft squadrons
