= Harold C. Train =

United States Navy rear admiral

Harold Cecil Train
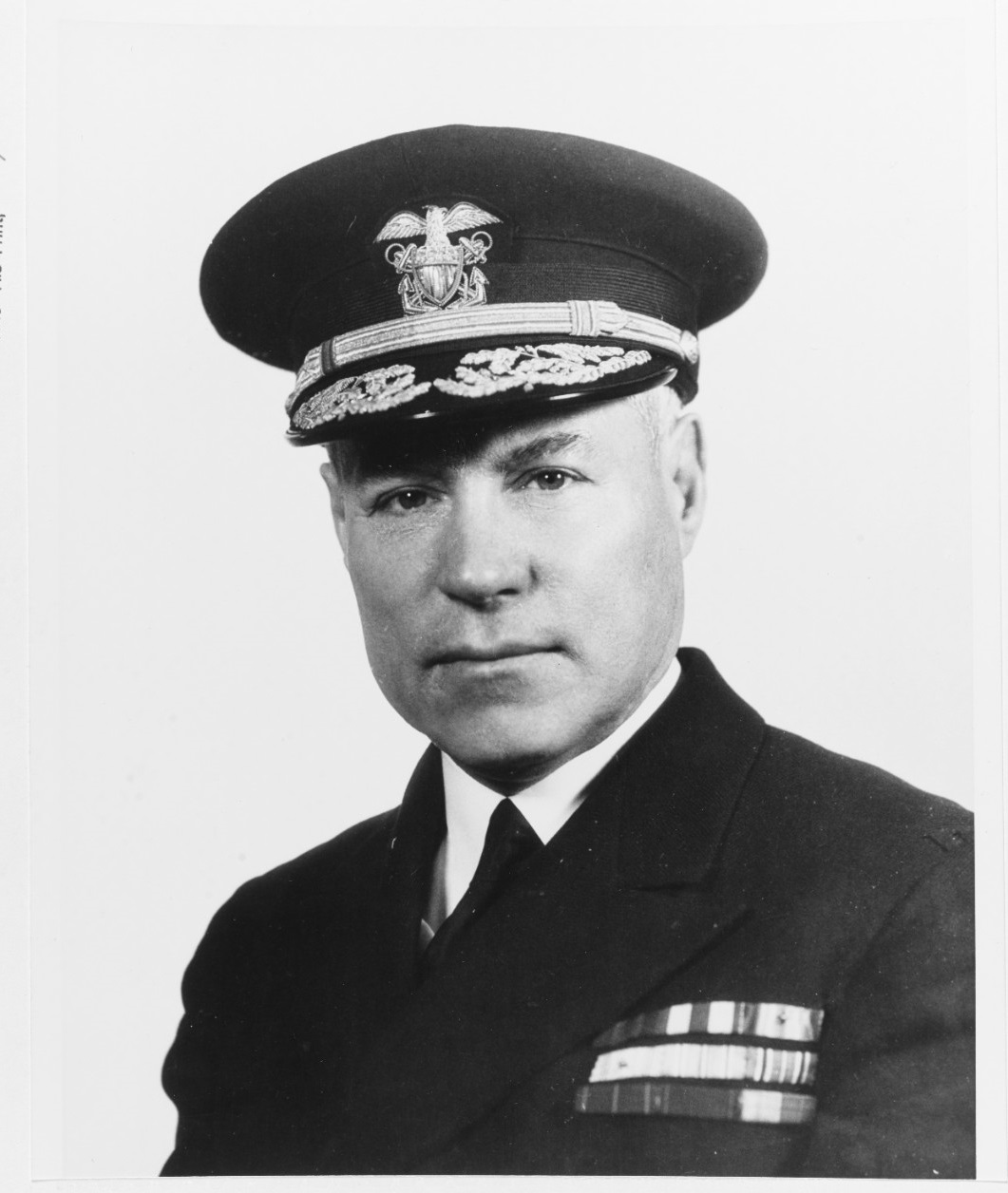
- Born: October 15, 1887; Kansas City, Missouri, U.S.
- Died: September 7, 1968 (aged 80); Bethesda, Maryland, U.S.
- Relatives: Admiral Harry D. Train II (son); Rear Admiral Elizabeth L. Train (granddaughter)
- Military career
- Allegiance: United States
- Branch: United States Navy
- Service years: 1909–1946
- Rank: Rear Admiral
- Commands: Director of the Office of Naval Intelligence; 15th Naval District; USS Arizona; USS Parrott
- Conflicts: Occupation of Nicaragua; World War I World War II
- Awards: Legion of Merit (2); Commendation Medal
- Other work: Superintendent of the Admiral Farragut Academy

Harold Cecil Train (October 15, 1887 – September 7, 1968) was a rear admiral in the United States Navy who served as the Director of the Office of Naval Intelligence between 1942 and 1943 and as commanding officer of the battleship USS Arizona. He was father of Admiral Harry D. Train II and grandfather of Rear Admiral Elizabeth L. Train.

== Early life ==
Harold C. Train was born on October 15, 1887, in Kansas City, Missouri, the son of real estate dealer, Harry Depue (1860–1915) and Dora Elizabeth Langdon Train (1864–1916). He had four brothers and three sisters, but four of his siblings died in infancy. He attended the local public schools Kansas City and subsequently entered the United States Naval Academy in Annapolis, Maryland.

Train graduated from the academy on June 4, 1909, with the rank of passed midshipman and was assigned to the armored cruiser USS West Virginia. After two years of service at sea, then required by law, he was commissioned ensign on June 5, 1911.

In March 1912, Train was transferred to the armored cruiser USS California. Aboard that ship, Train was appointed a company commander of the California Battalion ashore during the Revolution in Nicaragua. Train subsequently served aboard gunboat USS Yorktown, operating in the Mexican waters. Then he spent several months as engineer officer aboard the ship USS Cheyenne.

During World War I, Train was assigned to the Office of Naval Communications, Navy Department in Washington, D.C. Finally he went overseas in March 1918, when he was assigned executive officer of the USS Siboney, which was tasked with the transport of the troops to the Europe.

== World War II ==
Captain Train was appointed as commanding officer of the battleship USS Arizona on February 3, 1940, and served in this capacity for one year. Then he became a chief of staff with Battle Force under the command of Vice Admiral William S. Pye.

During the Japanese Attack on Pearl Harbor, Train issued orders for the battleship USS Nevada not to sortie, in order to minimize the damage of the ship and avert the possibility of the sinking and blocking the Pearl Harbor channel. For his conduct during the attack, Train was awarded the Navy Commendation Medal with Combat "V" from the commander of the Pacific Fleet, Admiral Chester W. Nimitz.

Train then spent almost three months as chief of staff with Admiral Nimitz' Pacific Fleet, before he was ordered to report to the Office of the Chief of Naval Operations, Admiral Ernest King. His next assignment was capacity of Director of the Office of Naval Intelligence, in which he replaced Rear Admiral Theodore S. Wilkinson on July 20, 1942. Train was promoted to the rank of rear admiral a month later.

In September 1943, Train was transferred to the Balboa, Panama, where he was appointed as commander of 15th Naval District, Panama Sea Frontier and Commander Southeast Pacific Force. In this capacity, he replaced Rear Admiral Clifford E. Van Hook and was responsible for the securing of the Panama Canal besides his other duties. For his service in this role, he was awarded the Legion of Merit by the army.

Train was relieved of that command on June 10, 1944, and transferred back to the United States for further assignment. He was subsequently assigned to the Joint Post-War Committee within Joint Chiefs of Staff in Washington, D.C. This work include diplomatic assignments with the United States delegation at Dumbarton Oaks Conference and to the United Nations organization and its first meetings in San Francisco.

After the Japanese surrender, Train remained on active duty as senior naval member of the Joint Post-War Committee until his retirement. He was decorated by the army with an oak leaf cluster to his Legion of Merit for the service with this committee.

== Postwar life ==
Train retired from the navy on May 1, 1946, and subsequently accepted the capacity of superintendent of the Admiral Farragut Academy in St. Petersburg, Florida. After his second retirement, he lived with his wife in Bethesda, Maryland, where he died on September 7, 1968.

Train was survived by his wife May Philipps Train (1889–1980), daughters Marian, Harriett, Jane and son Harry D. Train II (future admiral in the United States Navy). He was also grandfather of Rear Admiral Elizabeth L. Train.

== Decorations ==
Rear Admiral Harold C. Train's ribbon bar:

1st Row	Legion of Merit with Oak Leaf Cluster (Awarded by the Army)		
2nd Row	Navy Commendation Medal with Combat "V"	Nicaraguan Campaign Medal	Mexican Service Medal
3rd Row	World War I Victory Medal with Transport Clasp	American Defense Service Medal with Fleet Clasp	Asiatic-Pacific Campaign Medal with two service stars
4th Row	American Campaign Medal	World War II Victory Medal	Order of Abdon Calderón, 2nd Class (Ecuador)
5th Row	Grand Officer of the Order of Boyaca (Colombia)	Orden del Mérito, Gran Oficial (Chile)	Order of Vasco Núñez de Balboa, Gran Oficial (Panama)
6th Row	Orden Militar de Ayacucho, Grand Officer (Peru)	Commander's Cross of the Order of Polonia Restituta (Poland)	Chinese Special Collar Order of Yun Hui (Republic of China)

Military offices
Preceded by Theodore S. Wilkinson	Director of the Office of Naval Intelligence; 1942–1943	Succeeded by Roscoe E. Schuirmann
