= John B. Goodrich =

American lawyer and politician (1836–1900)

District Attorney of Middlesex County, Massachusetts
- In office 1872–1874
- Preceded by: Isaac S. Morse
- Succeeded by: George Stevens

Personal details
- Born: January 7, 1836 Fitchburg, Massachusetts, U.S.
- Died: January 11, 1900 (aged 64) Boston, Massachusetts, U.S.
- Party: Republican
- Spouse: Anne Louise Woodward (1865–1900; his death)
- Education: Dartmouth College
- Occupation: Lawyer

John Benton Goodrich (January 7, 1836 – January 11, 1900) was an American lawyer and politician who was district attorney of Middlesex County, Massachusetts from 1872 to 1874.

Goodrich was born on January 7, 1836, in Fitchburg, Massachusetts to John and Mary A. (Blake) Goodrich. He graduated from Dartmouth College in 1857 and studied law in the office of Norcross & Snow in Fitchburg. He was admitted to the bar in 1859. He opened an office in Boston and resided in Watertown, Massachusetts, where he was a member of the school committee. In 1865 he married Anne Louise Woodward. They had one son. That same year he moved to Newton, Massachusetts. From 1868 to 1871 he was chairman of the Newton school board. From 1869 to 1870 he was a member of the Massachusetts House of Representatives. From 1872 to 1874 he was the district attorney of Middlesex County, Massachusetts. He died on January 11, 1900.
