= Harry D. Train II =

American navy admiral (1927–2026)

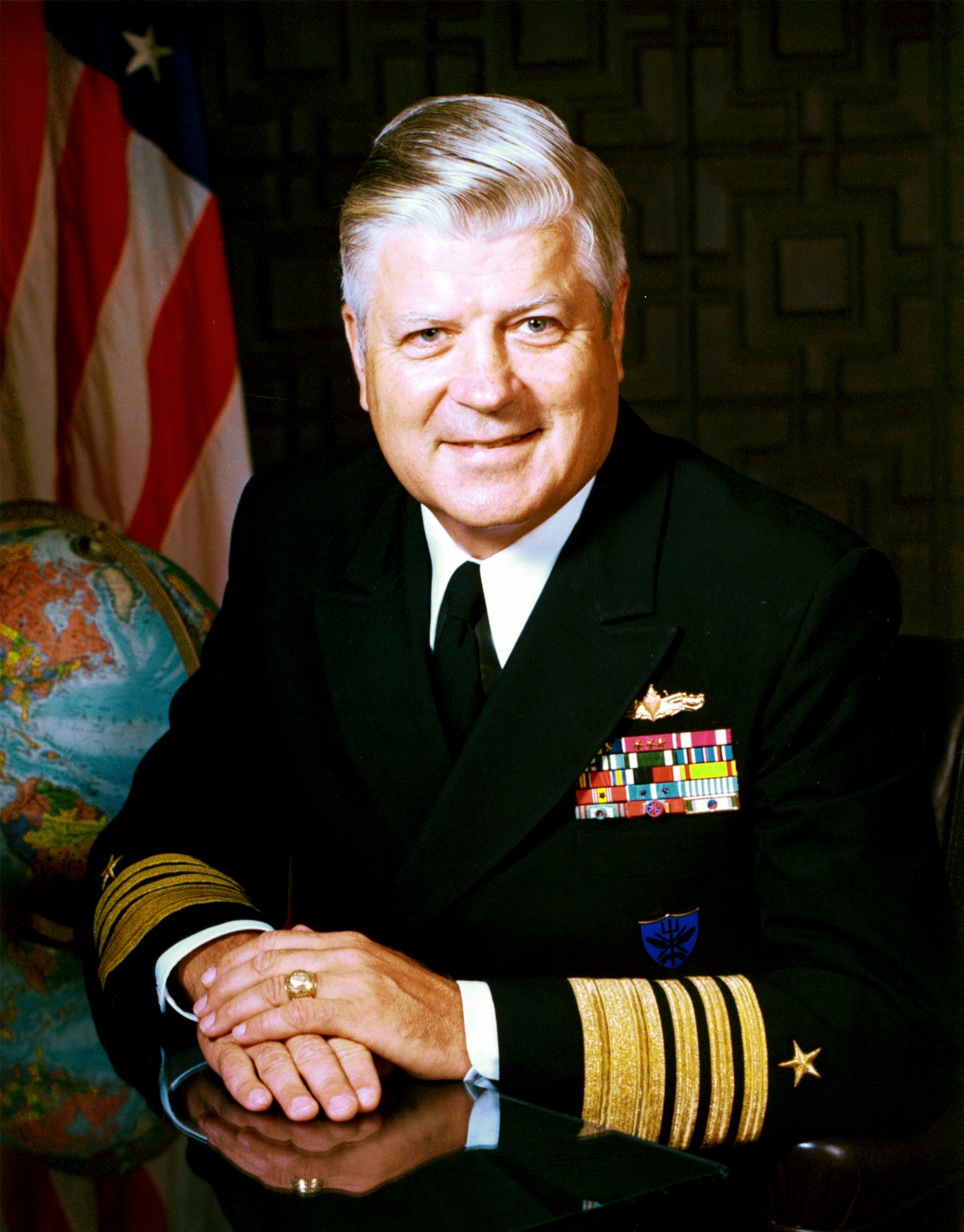
- Train in 1982
- Born: November 5, 1927; Washington, D.C., U.S.
- Died: July 31, 2026 (aged 98); Norfolk, Virginia, U.S.
- Relatives: Rear Admiral Harold C. Train (father); Rear Admiral Elizabeth L. Train (daughter)
- Military career
- Allegiance: United States
- Branch: United States Navy
- Service years: 1949–1982
- Rank: Admiral
- Commands: Supreme Allied Commander Atlantic; United States Atlantic Command; United States Atlantic Fleet; United States Sixth Fleet; Carrier Strike Group 6 Cruiser-Destroyer Flotilla 8 USS Conyngham (DDG-17); USS Barbel (SS-580)
- Conflicts: World War II; Korean War
- Awards: Defense Distinguished Service Medal; Navy Distinguished Service Medal (4); Legion of Merit (4)

Harry Depue Train II (November 5, 1927 – July 31, 2026) was a United States Navy admiral and a Senior Fellow at the Joint Advanced Warfighting School at the Joint Forces Staff College in Norfolk, Virginia.

== Naval career ==
Train was admitted to the United States Naval Academy in 1945 and graduated in 1949.

His operational commands included the attack submarine USS Barbel (SS-580); the guided missile destroyer USS Conyngham (DDG-17); Cruiser-Destroyer Flotilla 8; the John F. Kennedy Battle Group; and from August 1976 to September 1978, the United States Sixth Fleet in the Mediterranean Sea.

Train's principal staff duties included Director of the Joint Staff, Office of the Joint Chiefs of Staff; Executive Assistant to the Chairman, Joint Chiefs of Staff; and Executive Assistant to the Chief of Naval Operations. He served as an aide to the Chairman of the Joint Chiefs of Staff Admiral Thomas H. Moorer.

From 1978 to 1982, Train served as the North Atlantic Treaty Organization's Supreme Allied Commander Atlantic as Commander-in-Chief, United States Atlantic Command and Commander-in-Chief, United States Atlantic Fleet. He retired from the Navy in 1982.

== Personal life and post-military service ==
The son of Rear Admiral Harold Cecil Train (1887–1968) and May Philipps Train (1889–1980), he graduated from the Georgetown Preparatory School in 1945 and the United States Naval Academy in 1949.

Train and his wife, Catharine, had four daughters, including Rear Admiral Elizabeth L. Train.

In 1956, he joined the District of Columbia Society of the Sons of the American Revolution.

After retiring from full-time military service, Train composed his memoirs, Reminiscences of Rear Admiral Harry D. Train II, U.S. Navy, which he published through the Naval Institute Press in 1997. Train also worked for Science Applications International Corporation (SAIC), the nation's largest employee owned research and engineering company. He retired from SAIC as its Manager, Hampton Roads Operations, in September 2006.

Train served as a commissioner on the U.S. Commission on National Security/21st Century. He was a member of the Board of Trustees of the Old Dominion University Research Foundation, and was the long-time president of the Future of Hampton Roads, a group of civic leaders who work toward regional solutions in Hampton Roads, Virginia.

== Death ==
Train died in Norfolk, Virginia on July 31, 2026, at the age of 97.

== Awards and decorations ==

Badge	Surface Warfare Officer Pin		
1st Row	Defense Distinguished Service Medal		
2nd Row	Navy Distinguished Service Medal with three gold stars	Legion of Merit with three gold stars	Meritorious Service Medal
3rd row	Joint Services Commendation Medal with oak leaf cluster	Navy and Marine Corps Commendation Medal	China Service Medal
4th row	American Campaign Medal	World War II Victory Medal	Navy Occupation Service Medal
5th Row	National Defense Service Medal with service star	Korean Service Medal with two battle stars	Order of Naval Merit (Brazil), Grand Cross
6th row	Order of the Republic (Tunisia), Commander	Republic of Korea Presidential Unit Citation	United Nations Korea Medal
Badge (not shown)	Supreme Allied Commander Atlantic		

== See also ==
- List of United States Navy four-star admirals

Military offices
Preceded by Isaac C. Kidd Jr.	Commander-in-Chief, United States Atlantic Fleet; September 30, 1978 - September 30, 1982	Succeeded by Wesley L. McDonald
Preceded by Frederick C. Turner	Commander-in-Chief, United States Sixth Fleet; August 1976 – September 1978	Succeeded by James D. Watkins
