= Charles R. Train (admiral) =

American naval officer (1879–1967)

Charles Russell Train
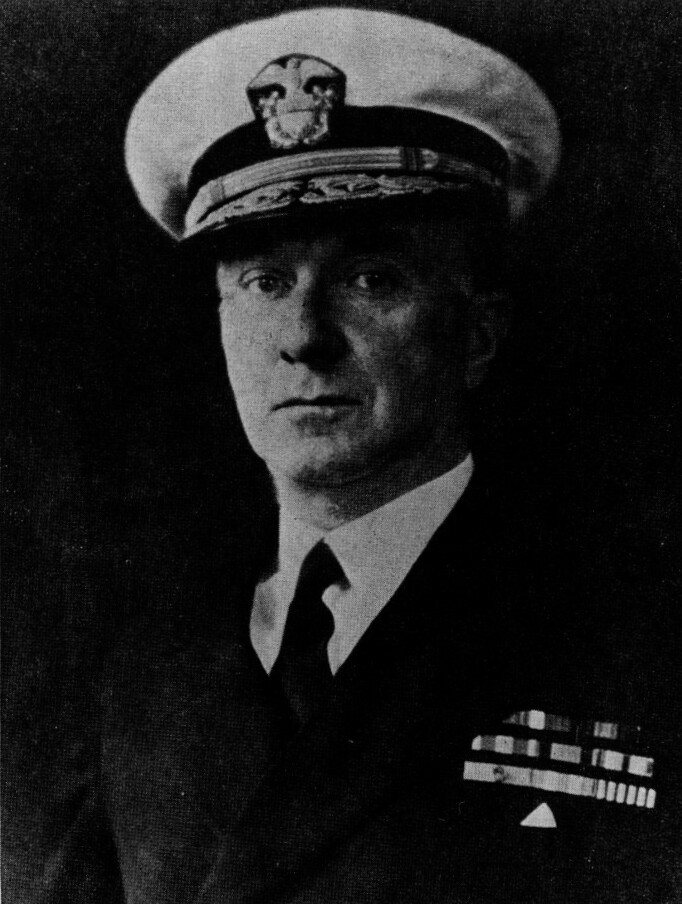
- Train (c. 1938)
- Born: September 19, 1879; Annapolis, Maryland, U.S.
- Died: December 8, 1967 (aged 88); Georgetown, Washington, D.C., U.S.
- Burial place: Oak Hill Cemetery; Washington, D.C., U.S.
- Education: United States Naval Academy
- Spouse: Errol Cuthbert Brown (m. 1908)
- Children: 3, including Russell
- Relatives: Charles J. Train (father); Charles R. Train (grandfather)
- Military career
- Branch: United States Navy
- Service years: 1900–1939
- Rank: Rear admiral
- Commands: USS Chester; Destroyer Flotilla 2 (Atlantic Fleet); Destroyer Flotilla 3 (Atlantic Fleet); USS Henderson; USS Utah; Cruiser Division Three, Battle Force; Battleship Two, Battle Force; USS Brooklyn
- Conflicts: World War I
- Awards: Navy Cross; Order of Saints Maurice and Lazarus; War Cross of Military Valor; Victory Medal (Overseas Clasp)

Charles Russell Train (September 19, 1879 – December 8, 1967) was rear admiral of the United States Navy. He served as President Herbert Hoover's naval aide from 1929 to 1932. He was a recipient of the Navy Cross, Order of Saints Maurice and Lazarus and the War Cross of Military Valor.

== Early life ==
Train was born on September 19, 1879, in Annapolis, Maryland, to Grace (née Tomlinson) and Rear Admiral Charles J. Train. His grandfather was Charles R. Train, a U.S. representative from Massachusetts. Train grew up in Washington, D.C. He was appointed to the United States Naval Academy by James W. Wadsworth. While in college, he was a boxer and graduated in 1900.

== Career ==
In 1901, Train served as a midshipman during the celebration of the Constitution of Australia and the opening of the Commonwealth of Australia. Train and his father were part of the Great White Fleet. Train had command of a gunboat on the Yangtze River after the Boxer Rebellion. He served as an escort for Alice Roosevelt and Nicholas Longworth while they were in China. He was serving with his father in China when the elder Train died from an illness. During the Russo-Japanese War, Train served in Niuzhuang. When in China, Train accidentally shot and injured a Chinese woman while pheasant hunting near Nanjing and he was attacked by villagers.

In 1914, Train served as naval attaché at the U.S. Embassy in Rome, under Ambassador Thomas Nelson Page. On October 14, 1918, he was detailed to command the U.S. Naval Aviation Forces in Italy. He received the Navy Cross for his service as attaché and his command of the U.S. Naval Aviation Forces in Italy. He also received the Order of Saints Maurice and Lazarus by the Italian government and the War Cross of Military Valor by Italy. On August 6, 1919, Train took command of the USS Chester. In January 20, he took command of Destroyer Flotilla 2 of the Atlantic Fleet and later took command of Destroyer Flotilla 3.

In 1921, Train transferred to the Training Division of the United States Department of the Navy. In 1924, Train took command of the USS Henderson, a transport ship. Train came to Paris for the 1924 Summer Olympics with members of the U.S. Navy. In May 1926, Train took charge of the Inspection Division of the U.S. Department of the Navy. On August 4, 1928, Train became the commander of the USS Utah. Train was ordered to escort U.S. President-elect Herbert Hoover from Montevideo, Uruguay to the United States. He befriended Hoover and within a year became President Hoover's naval aide. He served in that role from June 24, 1929, to June 1932.

From 1932 to 1933, he completed a course at the Naval War College. Train was promoted to rear admiral in 1933 while stationed there. He then served as commander of Cruiser Division Three, Battle Force from 1933 to 1935. He then returned to the Naval War College for an advanced course. In 1936, Train was appointed president of the Naval Examining Board and assumed command of Battleship Two, Battle Force. Train retired due to disability on July 1, 1939. In his service, Train also received medals for service in the Spanish Campaign, Philippine Campaign (aboard the USS Brooklyn) and the Victory Medal (Overseas Clasp).

== Personal life ==
Train married Errol Cuthbert Brown on June 15, 1908. Train and Brown grew up down the street from each other in Washington, D.C. They had at least three children: Cuthbert Russell (born 1909), Middleton George Charles (born 1913) and Russell Errol (born 1920). His son Russell became the first chairman of the Council on Environmental Quality and the president and chief executive officer of the World Wildlife Fund. They had a summer house in Jamestown, Rhode Island, and bought a house in Washington, D.C., on Q Street.

He was friends with Admiral William Halsey Jr.

Train died on December 8, 1967, at his home in Georgetown. He was interred at Oak Hill Cemetery in Washington, D.C.
