= Charles J. Train =

American military officer (1845–1906)

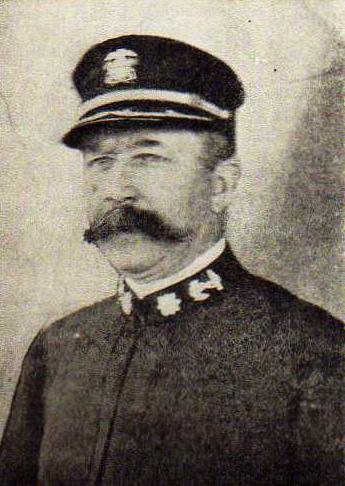
- Charles J. Train around the time of the Spanish–American War
- Born: May 14, 1845; Framingham, Massachusetts, U.S.
- Died: August 4, 1906 (aged 61); Yantai, China
- Burial place: United States Naval Academy Cemetery; Annapolis, Maryland, U.S.
- Children: Charles R. Train
- Relatives: Charles R. Train (father)
- Military career
- Allegiance: United States
- Branch: United States Navy
- Service years: 1864–1906
- Rank: Rear Admiral
- Commands: USS Jamestown; USS Constellation; USS Machias (PG-5); USS Prairie (AD-5); USS Massachusetts (BB-2); United States Asiatic Fleet
- Conflicts: Spanish–American War

Charles Jackson Train (May 14, 1845 – August 4, 1906) was a rear admiral in the United States Navy. He served in the Spanish–American War and later as the second Commander-in-Chief of the United States Asiatic Fleet.

== Naval career ==
Train was born in Framingham, Massachusetts, on May 14, 1845, and was appointed to the United States Naval Academy on November 27, 1861, graduating in November 1864. From 1866 to 1867 he served aboard the flagship of the Mediterranean Squadron, the screw frigate USS Colorado, being promoted to ensign on November 1, 1866, and to master on December 1, 1866, while aboard Colorado. During 1868 he served aboard the screw sloop-of-war USS Frolic in the European Squadron, and was promoted to lieutenant on March 12, 1868, while aboard Frolic. He was aboard the screw frigate USS Sabine while she made midshipman training cruises to ports in Europe and the Mediterranean in 1869 and 1870, and was promoted to lieutenant commander on June 30, 1869.

Train returned to the U.S. Naval Academy to serve as an instructor from 1871 to 1872. He was assigned to special duty in 1873, and in 1874 and 1875 had another special duty assignment to study the December 1874 transit of Venus. From 1875 to 1876 he was aboard the sloop-of-war USS Tuscarora on the Pacific Station. He had several assignments in 1877, beginning with duty at the Mare Island Navy Yard in Vallejo, California, followed by a stint aboard the sloop-of-war USS Lackawanna on the Pacific Station, and then a return to the Naval Academy for a second tour as an instructor in navigation.

Leaving the Naval Academy in 1881, Train received a special duty assignment aboard the sidewheel frigate USS Powhatan from 1881 to 1884. He was assigned to the Bureau of Equipment and Recruiting from 1884 to 1886 and was promoted to commander on January 17, 1886. Train took command of a training ship, the sloop-of-war USS Jamestown, from 1886 to 1888, then was commanding officer of another training ship, the sloop-of-war USS Constellation, from 1888 to 1889. After service as a lighthouse inspector from 1889 to 1890, he took command of the schooner-rigged gunboat USS Machias on 20 July 1893.

Train reported for duty to the Naval War College in Newport, Rhode Island, in June 1894, then in October 1894 became a naval member of the Cotton States and International Exposition in Atlanta, Georgia. In June 1896 he became a lighthouse inspector in the Fourth District, serving in that capacity until 1898.

On the eve of the Spanish–American War, Train was ordered to the auxiliary cruiser USS Prairie, and became her first commanding officer when she was commissioned on April 8, 1898. Train then took command of the battleship USS Massachusetts on April 19, 1898, commanding her during the war. She participated in the blockade of Santiago de Cuba but missed the Battle of Santiago de Cuba because she was away coaling.

Promoted to captain on November 22, 1898, Train became a member of the Board of Inspection and Survey on May 14, 1901, and served as its president from January 1903 to February 1904.

Promoted to rear admiral, Train became the commander-in-chief of the U.S. Asiatic Fleet on March 30, 1905. During his tour, he was involved in various ways with the last weeks of the Russo-Japanese War of 1904–1905, and after the decisive Japanese defeat of the Imperial Russian Navy in the Battle of Tsushima Strait in May 1905 units of the Asiatic Fleet escorted three fleeing Russian cruisers into Manila Bay in the Philippine Islands, where he ensured that their crews were well taken care of during a lengthy stay until they were able to return to Russia.

In November 1905, Train was at the center of a diplomatic dispute while with a group of American officers on a pheasant-hunting expedition near Nanking, China, when his son, Navy Lieutenant Charles R. Train, accidentally shot a Chinese woman with birdshot, inflicting minor injuries on her. A mob of hundreds of Chinese villagers formed around Train's party and attacked it, pushing Train into the mud, seizing the officers' guns, and taking Train's son hostage. When 40 United States Marines landed to rescue the officers, the villagers attacked them with pitchforks and the Marines fired two shots. Local Chinese officials refused to return the officers' guns, but Train and his companions were able to extricate themselves without further injury to anyone. The governor of Nanking later apologized for the mob's actions, returned the American officers' guns, and punished the ringleaders of the mob.

== Personal life ==
The son of Charles Russell Train, Train was married to the former Grace Tomlinson (1850–1942). They had three children.

== Death ==
Train planned to retire from the Navy on May 14, 1907, upon reaching the mandatory retirement age of 62, but, before he could, he died of uremia in Yantai (known to Westerners at the time as "Chefoo"), China, on August 4, 1906, while in command of the Asiatic Fleet. After a memorial ceremony which the Japanese admiral Heihachiro Togo and other dignitaries attended at Yokohama, Japan, aboard Train's flagship, the battleship USS Ohio, the steamer Empress of China carried his body out of the harbor under escort. His body was transported directly to Washington, D.C.

Train is buried with his wife at the United States Naval Academy Cemetery in Annapolis, Maryland.

Military offices
Preceded by William M. Folger	Commander-in-Chief, United States Asiatic Fleet; March 30, 1905 – August 4, 1906	Succeeded by Willard H. Brownson
