= Charles R. Train =

Union Army officer

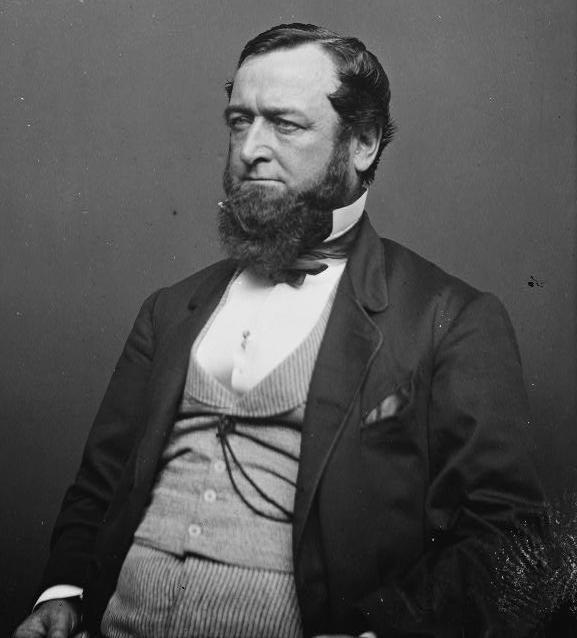

16th Massachusetts Attorney General
- In office 1872–1879
- Governor: William B. Washburn; Thomas Talbot; William Gaston; Alexander H. Rice
- Preceded by: Charles Allen
- Succeeded by: George Marston

Member of the U.S. House of Representatives from Massachusetts's 8th district
- In office March 4, 1859 – March 3, 1863
- Preceded by: Chauncey L. Knapp
- Succeeded by: John D. Baldwin

District Attorney of Middlesex County, Massachusetts
- In office 1853–1855
- Preceded by: Asa W. Farr
- Succeeded by: Isaac S. Morse
- In office 1848–1851
- Preceded by: Albert H. Nelson
- Succeeded by: Asa W. Farr

Member of the Boston Common Council
- In office 1867

Member of the Massachusetts Governor's Council
- In office 1857–1858

Member of the Massachusetts House of Representatives
- In office 1847–1848

Personal details
- Born: Charles Russell Train; October 18, 1817 Framingham, Massachusetts, U.S.
- Died: July 29, 1885 (aged 67) North Conway, New Hampshire, U.S.
- Resting place: Edgell Grove Cemetery, Framingham, Massachusetts
- Party: Republican
- Children: Charles Jackson Train; Arthur Cheney Train
- Education: Brown University
- Profession: Law
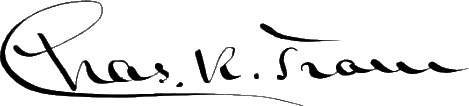
- Signature

Charles Russell Train (October 18, 1817 – July 29, 1885) was an American lawyer and politician who served two terms as a U.S. representative from Massachusetts from 1859 to 1863.

== Early life and education ==
Charles Russell Train was born in Framingham, Massachusetts on October 18, 1817. He attended the common schools, Framingham Academy, and was graduated from Brown University, Providence, Rhode Island, in 1837.

=== Legal career ===
Train studied law at Harvard University. Train was admitted to the bar and commenced practice in Framingham, Massachusetts in 1841.

== Political career ==
Train served as a member of the Massachusetts House of Representatives in 1847 and 1848.

From 1848 to 1851 and 1853 from 1855, Train was district attorney of Middlesex County, Massachusetts. He declined the appointment of Associate Justice of the Supreme Court of the United States in 1852.

Train served as delegate to the Massachusetts Constitutional Convention of 1853.

Train served as delegate to the Republican National Convention in 1856 and 1864.

Train served as member of the Massachusetts Governor's Council in 1857 and 1858.

=== Congress ===
Train was elected as Republican to the Thirty-sixth and Thirty-seventh Congresses (March 4, 1859 – March 3, 1863).

Train served as chairman of the Committee on Public Buildings and Grounds (Thirty-sixth and Thirty-seventh Congresses). He was not a candidate for renomination in 1862.

Train was one of the managers appointed by the House of Representatives in 1862 to conduct the impeachment proceedings against West H. Humphreys, United States judge for the several districts of Tennessee. During the Civil War, Train served in the Union Army as a volunteer aide-de-camp to General George B. McClellan.

=== Massachusetts attorney general ===
Train moved to Boston, Massachusetts.

In 1867, Train served on the Boston Common Council.

Train again served in the Massachusetts House of Representatives from 1868 to 1871.

Train was elected Massachusetts Attorney General from 1872 to 1879, after which he resumed the practice of law.

== Death and burial ==
Train died while on a visit in North Conway, New Hampshire, July 29, 1885. He was interred in Edgell Grove Cemetery, Framingham, Massachusetts.

== See also ==
- 1868 Massachusetts legislature

U.S. House of Representatives
Preceded by Chauncey L. Knapp	Member of the U.S. House of Representatives from Massachusetts's 8th congressional district 1859–1863	Succeeded by John D. Baldwin
Legal offices
Preceded by Charles Allen	Attorney General of Massachusetts; 1872–1879	Succeeded by George Marston
