= Navy-Wright NW =

NW Mystery Racer
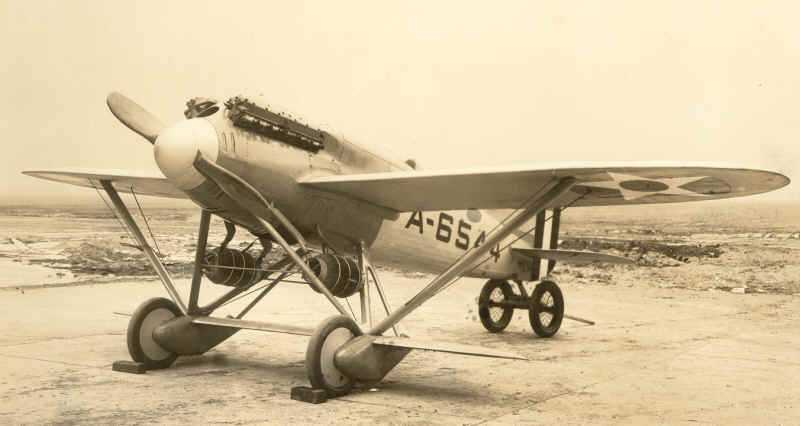
- The NW-1 before going to Selfridge Field, Michigan, 1922

General information
- Type: Air racing
- National origin: United States
- Manufacturer: Wright Aeronautical Corporation
- Designer: Rex Beisel
- Status: Both aircraft destroyed
- Primary user: US Navy
- Number built: 2 (2 NW-1, 1 NW-2 (rebuilt from the original NW-1)

History
- First flight: 11 October 1922

The Navy-Wright NW series, also called the Mystery Racer were racing aircraft built by Wright Aeronautical Corporation at the request of the US Navy. Although innovative, both prototype racers were lost before achieving their true potential.

== Design and development ==
In the early 1920s, the US Navy asked the Wright Aeronautical Corporation to design an engine based on the Lawrance J-1, the result being the Wright T-2 12-cylinder, water-cooled engine, with a proposed horsepower rating of 650 hp. At the time there was no aircraft that could properly use the engine, so the US Navy Bureau of Aeronautics designed an airframe to accommodate the new powerplant with construction of two prototypes (BU. Aer. Nos. A-6543 and A-6544) undertaken by the Wright Corporation.

Designated the Navy-Wright NW-1, A-6543, the first prototype was designed and built in three months, and flew for the first time on 11 October 1922, just days before it was entered in the 14 October 1922 Pulitzer air race at Selfridge Field, Michigan. Entered at the last minute, the press dubbed the new entry, the Mystery Racer.

The Navy-Wright NW-1 was an unconventional streamlined design, based on a sesquiplane with main wheels faired into the lower wing, and bracing minimized to further reduce drag. Lamblin radiators were suspended beneath the fuselage and wire bracing was incorporated for the mid-fuselage mounted main wing and tailplane.

== Operational history ==
With the rush to complete the NW-1, the aircraft was not fully tested and by the time of the Pulitzer Race, Lt. S. Sanderson had little opportunity to fly the racer. During the race, the NW-1 wearing race number "9", although reaching a top speed of 186 mph, its engine overheated and failed causing the NW-1 to ditch into Lake St. Clair, flipping over on its back.

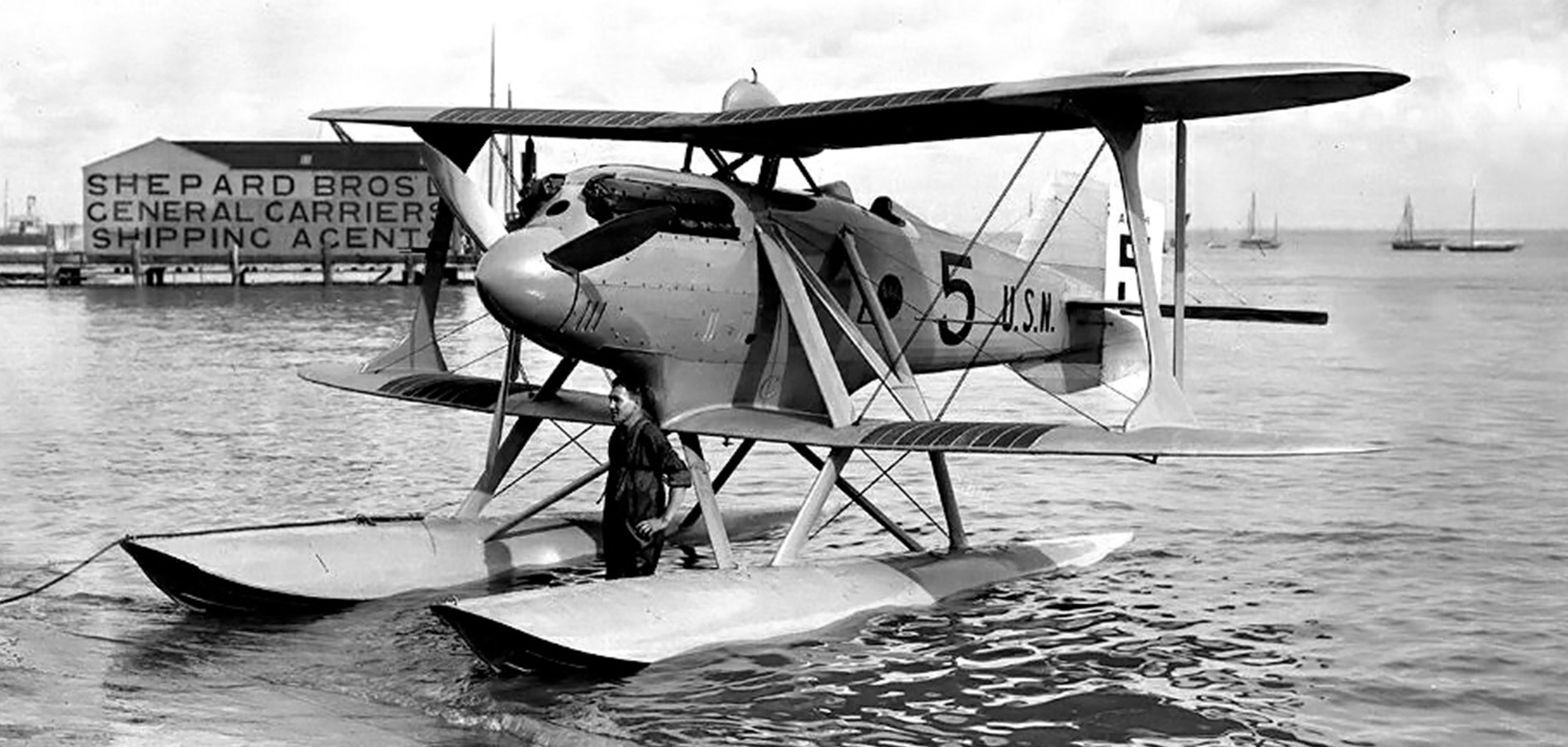
Navy-Wright NW-2 during testing at Cowes, Isle of Wight, 1923

=== Extensive changes ===
With the major damage suffered in the ditching, the US Navy resorted to cannibalizing the wrecked aircraft to provide spares for the second prototype, A-6544, which had been retained as an engine testbed for the T-2 engine.

Early in 1923, a decision was made to redesign the racer and in the months following, a completely new design emerged with the original landplane being converted into a floatplane. Radical surgery was performed to turn the sesquiplane into a biplane, with strutted wings, wing surface radiators, enlarged tail surfaces and a set of floats also part of the redesign. Fitted with a new, more powerful 700 hp Wright T-3, a development of the T-2 and a three-blade propeller, the second of the NW series was designated NW-2 and was entered into the 1923 Schneider Trophy held at Cowes, Isle of Wight.

The Navy conducted flight testing at Anacostia achieving a top speed of 176 mph, before shipping the NW-2 to England in September 1923. At Cowes, wearing the race number "5", during pre-race testing, the NW-2 suffered a propeller failure in flight with the shattered propeller slicing into the floats. The pilot, Lt. Frank Wead alighted but the severely damaged floats collapsed and the NW-2 sank, with Wead scrambling to safety, and being rescued uninjured.

The Navy-Wright NW series was abandoned after the sinking of the NW-2.

== Operators ==
United States

- United States Navy

== Specifications (NW-1) ==
Data from

General characteristics

- Crew: 1
- Length: 24 ft 0 in (7.31 m)
- Wingspan: 30 ft 6 in (9.29 m)
- Height: 11 ft 0 in (3.35 m)
- Wing area: 180 sq ft (16.72 m^{2})
- Empty weight: 2,480 lb (1,125 kg)
- Gross weight: 3,000 lb (1,400 kg)
- Powerplant: 1 × Wright T-2 , 525 hp (391 kW) (650 hp realized in test.)

Performance

- Maximum speed: 209 mph (336 km/h, 182 kn)
- Endurance: 1.6 hours

== Specifications (NW-2) ==
Data from

General characteristics

- Crew: 1
- Length: 28 ft 4.5 in (8.63 m)
- Wingspan: 27 ft 11 in (8.5 m)
- Wing area: 266 sq ft (24.71 m^{2})
- Powerplant: 1 × Wright T-3 , 750 hp (560 kW)

Performance

- Maximum speed: 176.5 mph (284 km/h, 153.4 kn)
- Endurance: 1.99 hourshours

== See also ==
Aircraft of comparable role, configuration, and era

- Nieuport-Delage Sesquiplan
