= Sikorsky S-33 Messenger =

S-33 Messenger
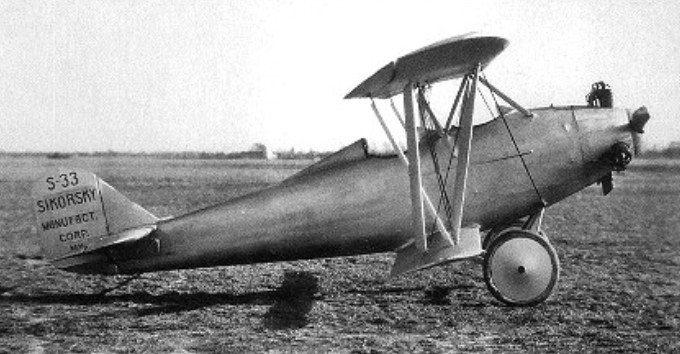

General information
- Type: Racer/Utility
- National origin: United States
- Manufacturer: Sikorsky
- Number built: 2

History
- First flight: 1925

The Sikorsky S-33 Messenger was an American two-seat sesquiplane designed and built by the Sikorsky Manufacturing Corporation in 1925.

The first of two examples built participated in the Sixth Pulitzer Trophy Race at Mitchel Field, Long Island, New York on October 12, 1925 and was piloted by Al Krapish, an employee of Sikorsky.

The first aircraft is reported to have been powered by a Wright Gale of 60 hp (45 kW) and the second by a Lawrance L-3 of 60 hp (45 kW). These were essentially the same engine type, post- and pre- acquisition of the Lawrance Aero Engine Company by the Wright Aeronautical Corporation, respectively. Some sources assert that the aircraft was powered by an Anzani engine, but this is most likely to be a mis-identification.

== Specifications (first aircraft) ==
Data from Aerofiles

General characteristics

- Crew: Two
- Capacity: 500 lb (230 kg)
- Length: 18 ft 0 in (5.49 m)
- Upper wingspan: 32 ft 0 in (9.75 m)
- Lower wingspan: 20 ft 0 in (6.10 m)
- Wing area: 160.4 sq ft (14.90 m^{2})
- Empty weight: 882 lb (400 kg)
- Gross weight: 1,389 lb (630 kg)
- Powerplant: 1 × Wright Gale 3-cylinder radial, 60 hp (45 kW)

Performance

- Maximum speed: 115 mph (185 km/h, 100 kn)
- Stall speed: 35 mph (56 km/h, 30 kn)
- Range: 400 mi (640 km, 350 nmi)
- Service ceiling: 15,000 ft (4,600 m)
