= Martin T4M =

1927 torpedo bomber aircraft family

T4M TG
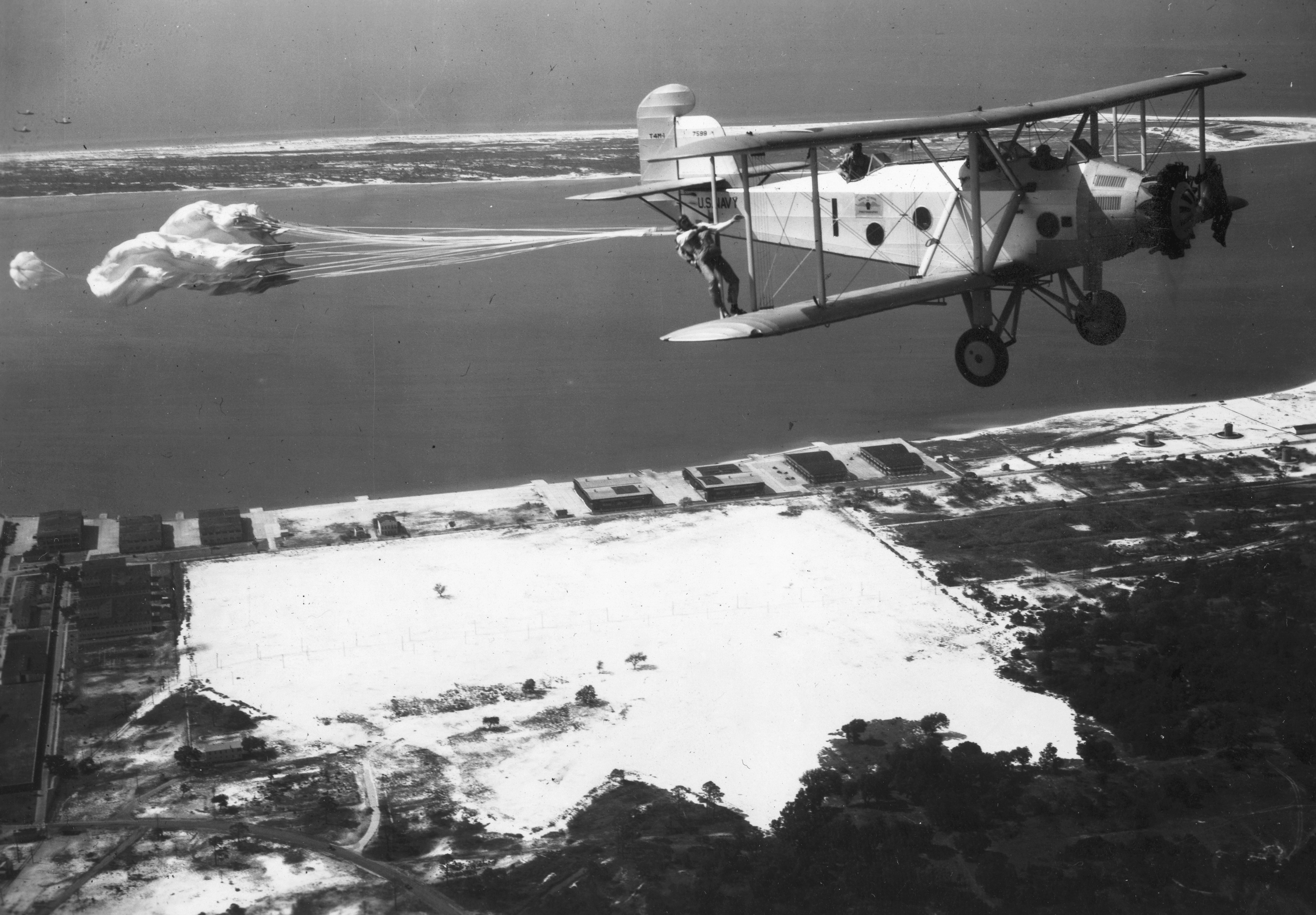
- Martin T4M

General information
- Type: Torpedo bomber
- Manufacturer: Glenn L. Martin Company/Great Lakes Aircraft Company
- Primary user: United States Navy
- Number built: 155

History
- First flight: 1927
- Retired: 1938
- Developed from: Martin T3M

The Martin T4M was an American torpedo bomber of the 1920s. A development by the Glenn L. Martin Company of their earlier Martin T3M, and, like it a single-engined biplane, the T4M served as the standard torpedo bomber aboard the aircraft carriers of the United States Navy through much of the 1930s.

== Development and design ==
The Martin Model 74 was designed and developed by the Glenn L. Martin Company as a result of testing of the experimental radial-engined developments of the Martin T3M, the XT3M-3 and XT3M-4. The resulting prototype, designated XT4M-1, first flew in April 1927, and was purchased by the U.S. Navy for further evaluation.

The XT4M-1 had new single-bay fabric-covered metal wings of shorter span than the wooden wings of the T3M. It was powered by a Pratt & Whitney Hornet, (as used by the XT3M-3), and was fitted with a revised rudder. The fuselage was similar to that of the T3M-2, and like the earlier aircraft, could be fitted with either a wheeled undercarriage or floats.

As a result of the successful trials, the U.S. Navy ordered 102 similar production aircraft from Martin as the T4M-1 on June 30, 1927. Martin sold their Cleveland factory, which had built the T4M, to the Great Lakes Aircraft Company in October 1928, which resulted in Great Lakes receiving an order for 18 aircraft with slightly modified undercarriages as the TG-1. On 2 July 1930, the U.S. Navy placed an order for 32 aircraft, powered by a more powerful Wright Cyclone radial engines with the Detroit Aircraft Corporation, as the TE-1. Detroit, however, passed the order to Great Lakes, which by this time was a subsidiary, and the aircraft were built as TG-2s.

== Operational history ==
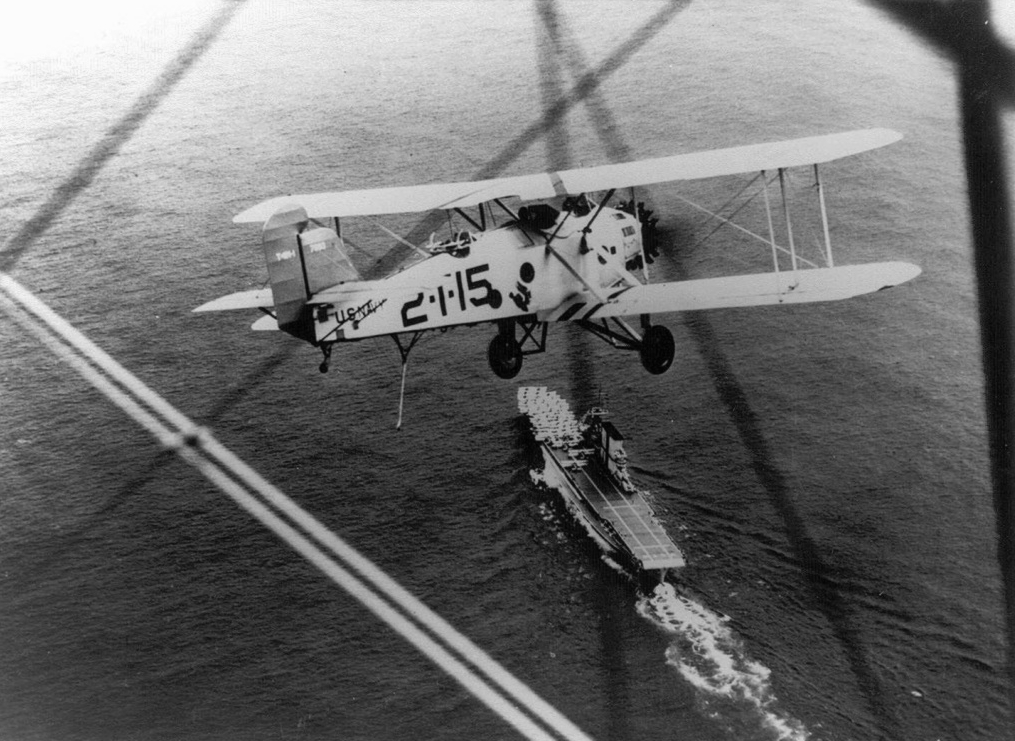
T4M

Deliveries of the T4M to the U.S. Navy started in August 1928, replacing T3M-2s aboard the aircraft carriers USS Saratoga and USS Lexington. Deliveries continued until 1931.

While its predecessor, the T3M, spent much of its time operating from floats, by the time the T4M and TG entered service, the U.S. Navy had realised the greater versatility of the aircraft carrier, and the T4Ms and TGs were mainly operated with wheeled undercarriages from the decks of carriers. The capability of carrier-based air power was demonstrated in fleet exercises in January 1929, when aircraft from Saratoga, including T4Ms, carried out mock attacks on the Panama Canal. Despite a defending force including Lexington and shore-based Navy and United States Army aircraft, the strike force was judged to have "destroyed" the canal locks as well as airfields. The exercise was described as "the most brilliantly conceived and most effectively executed naval operation in our history" by Admiral William V. Pratt, who later became Commander-in-Chief of the United States Fleet.

The T4M was unusual in that its slab-sided fuselage was large enough to allow flight crews to get up and move around between positions. It was so spacious that a man could nearly stand up within it. Of its flying qualities, one pilot was quoted as saying "It takes off, cruises, and lands at 65 knots [120 km/h; 75 mph]".

The T4M and TG proved difficult to replace, with both the XT6M and XT3D being evaluated but failing to demonstrate sufficient improvement to justify purchase. They remained in service until 1938, being eventually replaced by the TBD Devastator and becoming the last biplane torpedo bomber of the U.S. Navy.

== Variants ==
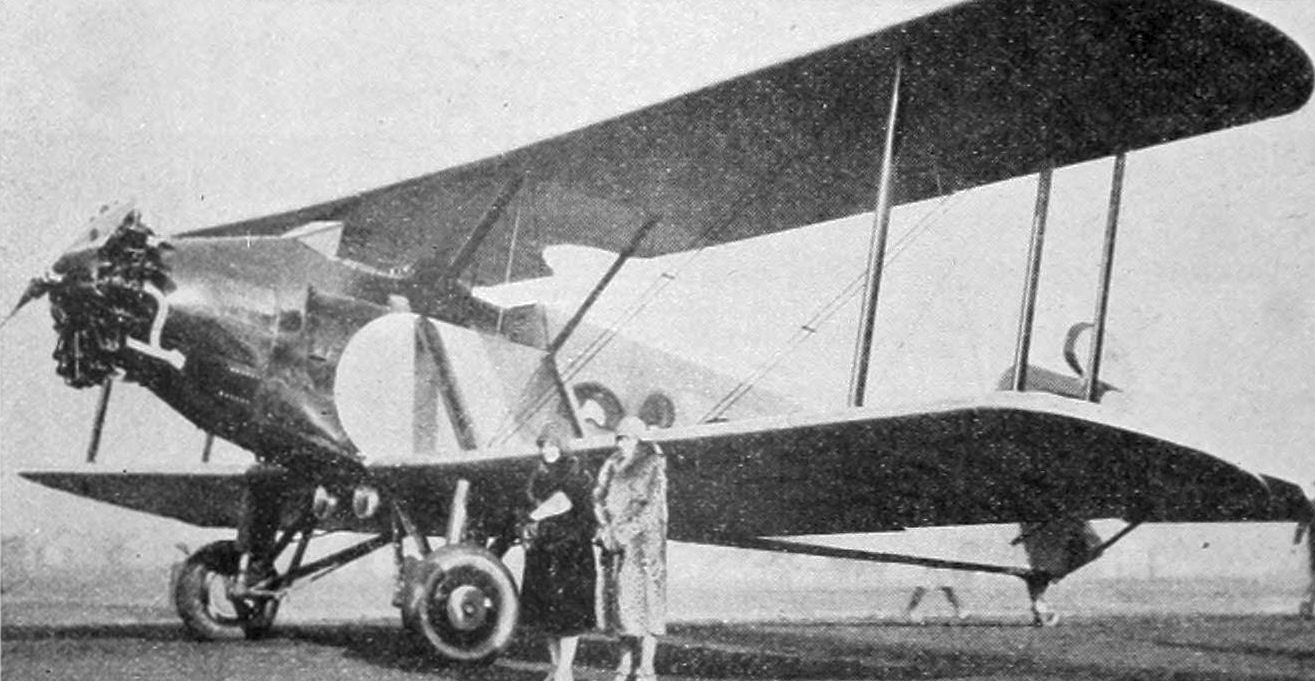
Great Lakes Commercial photo from Aero Digest, April 1929

XT4M-1
Prototype. Powered by 525 hp (392 kW) Pratt & Whitney R-1690-24 engine. One built.
T4M-1
Initial production version by Martin, powered by R-1690-24 engine. 102 built.
TG-1
Version with slightly modified undercarriage, powered by 525 hp (392 kW) Pratt & Whitney R-1690-28 engine. 18 built by Great Lakes.
TG-1 Commercial
Civil version of TG-1. Two built.
TG-2
Version powered by 620 hp (463 kW) Wright R-1820-86 Cyclone. 32 built by Great Lakes (originally ordered as TE-1).

== Operators ==
United States

- United States Marines Corps
- United States Navy

== Specifications (T4M-1) ==
Data from United States Navy Aircraft since 1911

General characteristics

- Crew: three
- Length: 35 ft 7 in (10.85 m)
- Wingspan: 53 ft 0 in (16.16 m)
- Height: 14 ft 9 in (4.50 m)
- Wing area: 656 sq ft (70.0 m^{2})
- Empty weight: 5,814 lb (2,643 kg)
- Gross weight: 9,503 lb (4,320 kg)
- Powerplant: 1 × Pratt & Whitney R-1690 Hornet 9 cylinder air-cooled radial engine, 525 hp (392 kW)

Performance

- Maximum speed: 114 mph (184 km/h, 99 kn)
- Cruise speed: 98 mph (158 km/h, 85 kn)
- Range: 363 mi (584 km, 316 nmi)
- Service ceiling: 10,150 ft (3,095 m)
- Wing loading: 14.5 lb/sq ft (61.7 kg/m^{2})
- Power/mass: 0.055 hp/lb (0.091 kW/kg)

Armament

- 1 × flexibly mounted 0.3 in (7.62 mm) machine gun in rear cockpit
- 1 × torpedo or bombs under fuselage

== See also ==
Related development

- Curtiss CS/Martin SC
- Martin T3M

Aircraft of comparable role, configuration, and era

- Blackburn Ripon
- Mitsubishi B2M

Related lists

- List of United States Navy aircraft designations (pre-1962)
