= Martin T3M =

1920s American torpedo bomber aircraft family

T3M
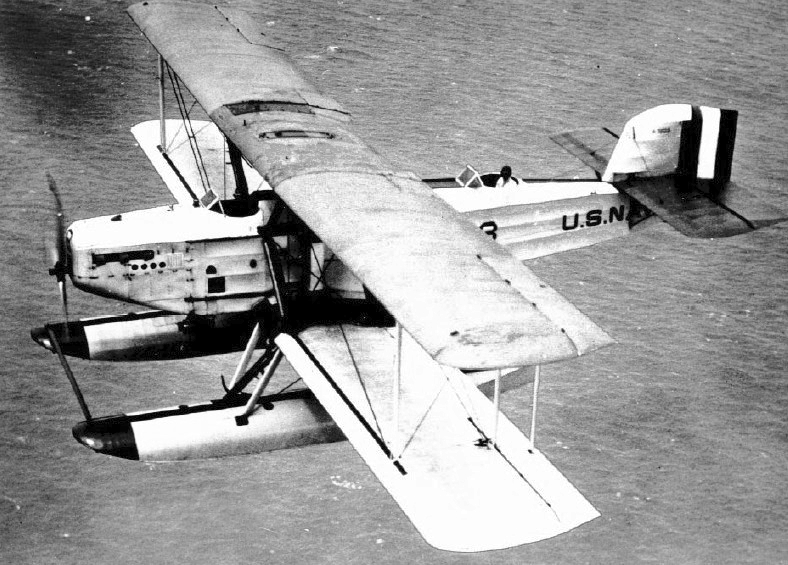
- T3M-2 floatplane

General information
- Type: Torpedo bomber
- Manufacturer: Glenn L. Martin Company
- Primary user: United States Navy
- Number built: 124

History
- First flight: 1926
- Retired: 1932
- Developed from: Curtiss CS
- Variant: Martin T4M

The Martin T3M was an American torpedo bomber of the 1920s. A single-engined three-seat biplane, it became a standard torpedo bomber of the U.S. Navy, operating from both land bases and from aircraft carriers from 1926 to 1932.

== Development and design ==
Having built 75 examples of the Martin SC, the production version of the Curtiss CS in 1925, the Glenn L. Martin Company was able to offer an improved version when the U.S. Navy had a requirement for an improved torpedo-bomber/scout aircraft. This aircraft, which was designated the T3M-1, first flew in July 1926.

The T3M was a large single-engined biplane capable of being fitted with either a conventional tailwheel undercarriage or floats. The fuselage was constructed of welded steel tube in place of the riveted steel frame of the CS/SC, with the pilot and bombardier seated side by side in the front cockpit situated forward of the wing, with the bombardier having a position under the nose for aiming the aircraft's bombs or torpedoes, while the gunner had a cockpit well aft of the wing, with a radiator slung under the top wing between the cockpits. Power was from a 575 hp (429 kW) Wright T-3B V-12 engine. 24 T3M-1s were built.

As the T3M-1 was underpowered, a new version was produced with the much more powerful (770 hp/574 kW) Packard 3A-2500 engine. This version, the T3M-2 had revised wings with the upper and lower wings of equal span (while in the T3M-1 the lower wings were of greater span), and the radiator was replaced by two radiators on the fuselage side, allowing the crew to be moved to three individual tandem cockpits. The U.S. Navy ordered 100 T3M-2s, one of which was re-engined with the Pratt & Whitney Hornet and the Wright Cyclone radial engines as the XT3M-3 and XT3M-4 respectively. These aircraft formed the basis of the Martin T4M that would replace the T3M in service with the U.S. Navy.

== Operational history ==
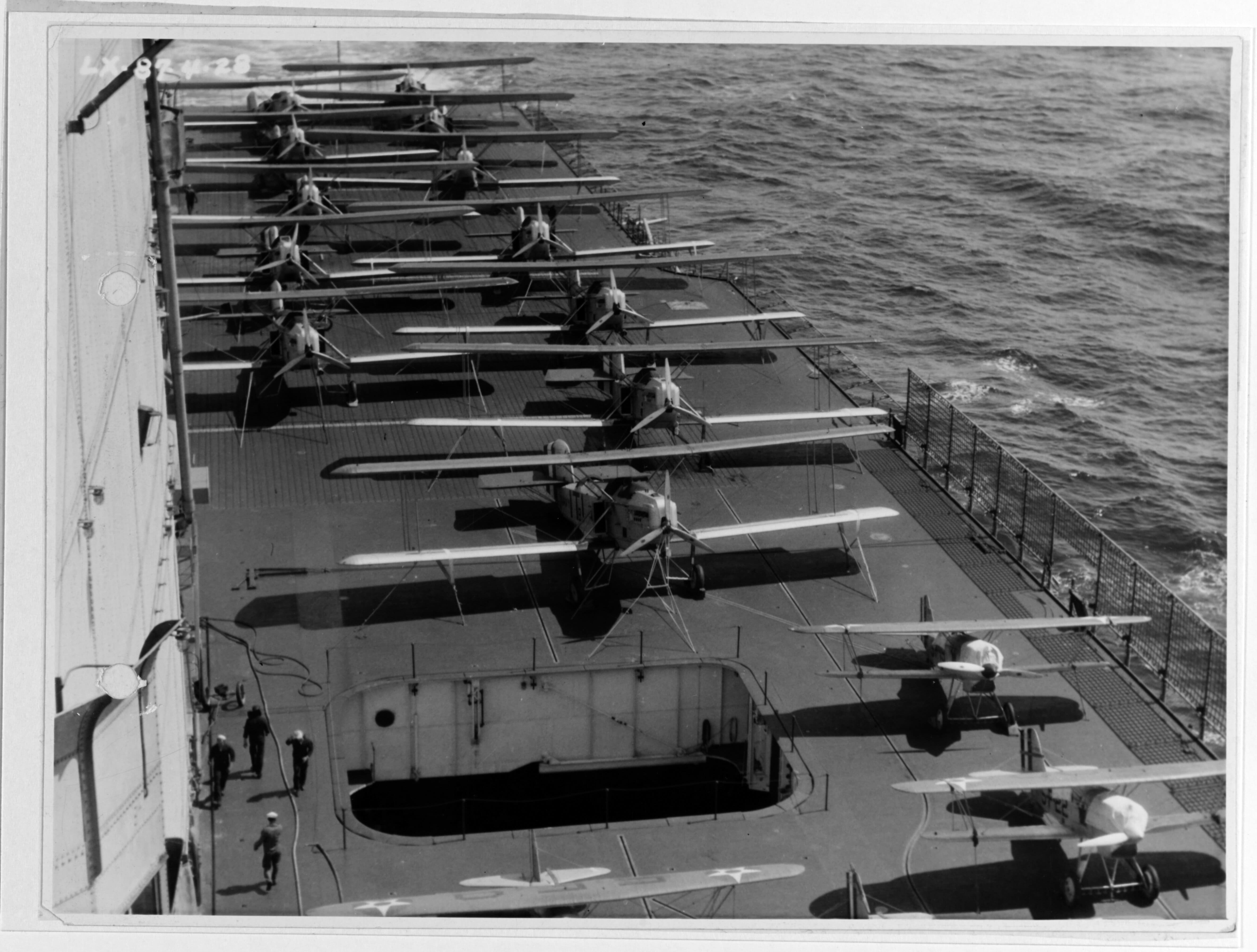
T3M-2s and Curtiss F6Cs on the deck of the carrier USS Lexington

Deliveries of the T3M-1 to the U.S. Navy started in September 1926. The T3M-1 was not heavily used, however, and was replaced in service by the more powerful T3M-2 from 1927. Although the T3M-2 itself was replaced in frontline service by its radial-powered development, the T4M, it remained in squadron service until at least 1932.

== Variants ==
T3M-1
Initial production version. Powered by 575 hp (429 kW) Wright T-3B engine. 24 built.
T3M-2
Main production version. One 770 hp (574 kW) Packard 3A-2500 engine. 100 built.
XT3M-3
First T3M-2 re-engined with Pratt & Whitney R-1690 Hornet radial engine.
XT3M-4
XT3M-3 modified by Naval Aircraft Factory to use Wright R-1750 Cyclone.

== Operators ==
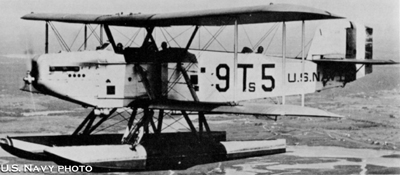
T3M-2

United States

- United States Marine Corps
- United States Navy

== Specifications (T3M-2) ==
Data from United States Navy Aircraft since 1911

General characteristics

- Crew: three
- Length: 41 ft 4 in (12.60 m)
- Wingspan: 56 ft 7 in (17.25 m)
- Height: 15 ft 1 in (4.60 m)
- Wing area: 883 sq ft (82.1 m^{2})
- Empty weight: 5,814 lb (2,643 kg)
- Gross weight: 9,503 lb (4,320 kg)
- Powerplant: 1 × Packard 3A-2500 liquid-cooled V-12 engine, 770 hp (574 kW)

Performance

- Maximum speed: 109 mph (175 km/h, 95 kn)
- Range: 634 mi (1,020 km, 551 nmi)
- Service ceiling: 7,900 ft (2,400 m)
- Wing loading: 10.8 lb/sq ft (52.6 kg/m^{2})
- Power/mass: 0.081 hp/lb (0.13 kW/kg)
- Climb to 5,000 ft: 16.8 min

Armament

- 1 × flexibly mounted 0.3 in (7.62 mm) machine gun in rear cockpit
- 1 × torpedo or bombs under fuselage

== See also ==
Related development

- Curtiss CS/Martin SC
- Martin T4M/Great Lakes TG

Aircraft of comparable role, configuration, and era

- Blackburn Ripon
- Mitsubishi B2M

Related lists

- List of United States Navy aircraft designations (pre-1962)
