= Wright Whirlwind series =

Family of radial aircraft engines

Whirlwind series
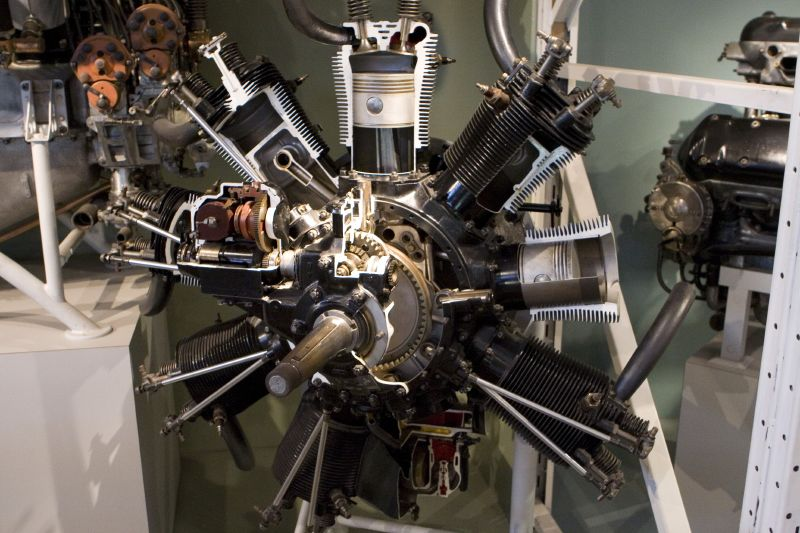
- Partially sectioned Wright J-4B at Canada Aviation Museum
- Type: Air-cooled radial piston engine
- National origin: United States
- Manufacturer: Wright Aeronautical
- Manufactured: 1923–1945
- Number built: 68,660

The Wright Whirlwind was a family of air-cooled radial aircraft engines built by Wright Aeronautical (originally an independent company, later a division of Curtiss-Wright). The family began with nine-cylinder engines, and later expanded to include five-cylinder and seven-cylinder varieties. Fourteen-cylinder twin-row versions were also developed, but these were not commercially produced.

The Whirlwind series was succeeded by more powerful but still air-cooled radial aero engines, notably the Pratt & Whitney Wasp series and the Wright Cyclone series.

== Description ==
The Whirlwind was a direct descendant of the Lawrance J-1, a nine-cylinder air-cooled radial built by the Lawrance Aero Engine Company for the U.S. Navy. Because the Navy was very enthusiastic about air-cooled radials, but was concerned that Lawrance could not produce enough engines for its needs, it forced Wright to purchase the Lawrance company in 1923 and build the J-1 itself. Wright's J-1 was the first engine in its nine-cylinder R-790 Whirlwind series and was quickly followed by the J-3, J-4, J-4A, J-4B, and finally the popular and successful J-5 of 1925.

In 1928, Wright replaced the R-790 series with the J-6 Whirlwind family, in which a supercharger was added to boost engine power and the cylinders were enlarged by expanding the bore. This family included three members: the nine-cylinder R-975, the seven-cylinder R-760, and the five-cylinder R-540, providing a range of different power levels using the same basic design. Of these, the R-975 proved the most popular, especially because of its use in armored fighting vehicles during World War II.

During the mid-1930s, Wright also developed two fourteen-cylinder double-row versions of the Whirlwind, the R-1510 of 600 hp (450 kW), and the R-1670 of 800 hp (600 kW). These were used in a number of military aircraft prototypes, but neither engine reached the production stage.

Air-cooled Whirlwinds were lighter and more reliable than liquid-cooled engines of similar power, since a liquid cooling system added weight and required extra maintenance. Thanks to these advantages Whirlwind engines were used widely and were built in large numbers. Licensed copies were produced by manufacturers such as Continental Motors, Hispano-Suiza, and adapted for Soviet government production by the Shvetsov OKB-19 design bureau. The Whirlwind's success led to the development of other air-cooled radial engines throughout the 1920s, 1930s, and 1940s.

== Whirlwind series ==
J-4 (1924)

- 9-cylinder single row air cooled radial
- Bore x stroke: 4 1/2 in × 5 1/2 in (114 mm × 140 mm)
- Displacement: 787 cu in (12.90 L)

J-5 / R-790 (1925)

- 9-cylinder single row air cooled radial
- Bore x stroke: 4 1/2 in × 5 1/2 in (114 mm × 140 mm)
- Displacement: 787 cu in (12.90 L)
- Power output: 200–220 hp (150–160 kW)

J-6-5 / R-540 (1928)

- 5-cylinder single row air cooled radial
- Bore x stroke: 5 in × 5 1/2 in (127 mm × 140 mm)
- Displacement: 540 cu in (8.8 L)
- Power output: 165–175 hp (123–130 kW)

J-6-7 / R-760 (1928)

- 7-cylinder single row air cooled radial
- Bore x stroke: 5 in × 5 1/2 in (127 mm × 140 mm)
- Displacement: 758 cu in (12.42 L)
- Power output: 240–350 hp (180–260 kW)

J-6-9 / R-975 (1928)

- 9-cylinder single row air cooled radial
- Bore x stroke: 5 in × 5 1/2 in (127 mm × 140 mm)
- Displacement: 972 cu in (15.93 L)
- Power output: 365–475 hp (272–354 kW)

R-1510

- 14-cylinder twin-row air cooled radial
- Bore x stroke: 5 in × 5 1/2 in (127 mm × 140 mm)
- Displacement: 1,512 cu in (24.78 L)
- Power output: 680–700 hp (510–520 kW)

R-1670

- 14-cylinder twin-row air cooled radial
- Bore x stroke: 5 1/4 in × 5 1/2 in (133 mm × 140 mm)
- Displacement: 1,667 cu in (27.32 L)
- Power output: 830–850 hp (620–630 kW)

== See also ==
- Whirlwind Glaciers in Antarctica named after the Wright Whirlwind series

Comparable engines

- Bristol Jupiter
- Pratt & Whitney Wasp series

Related lists

- List of aircraft engines
