= Naval Aircraft Factory SA =

Early American naval aircraft

SA
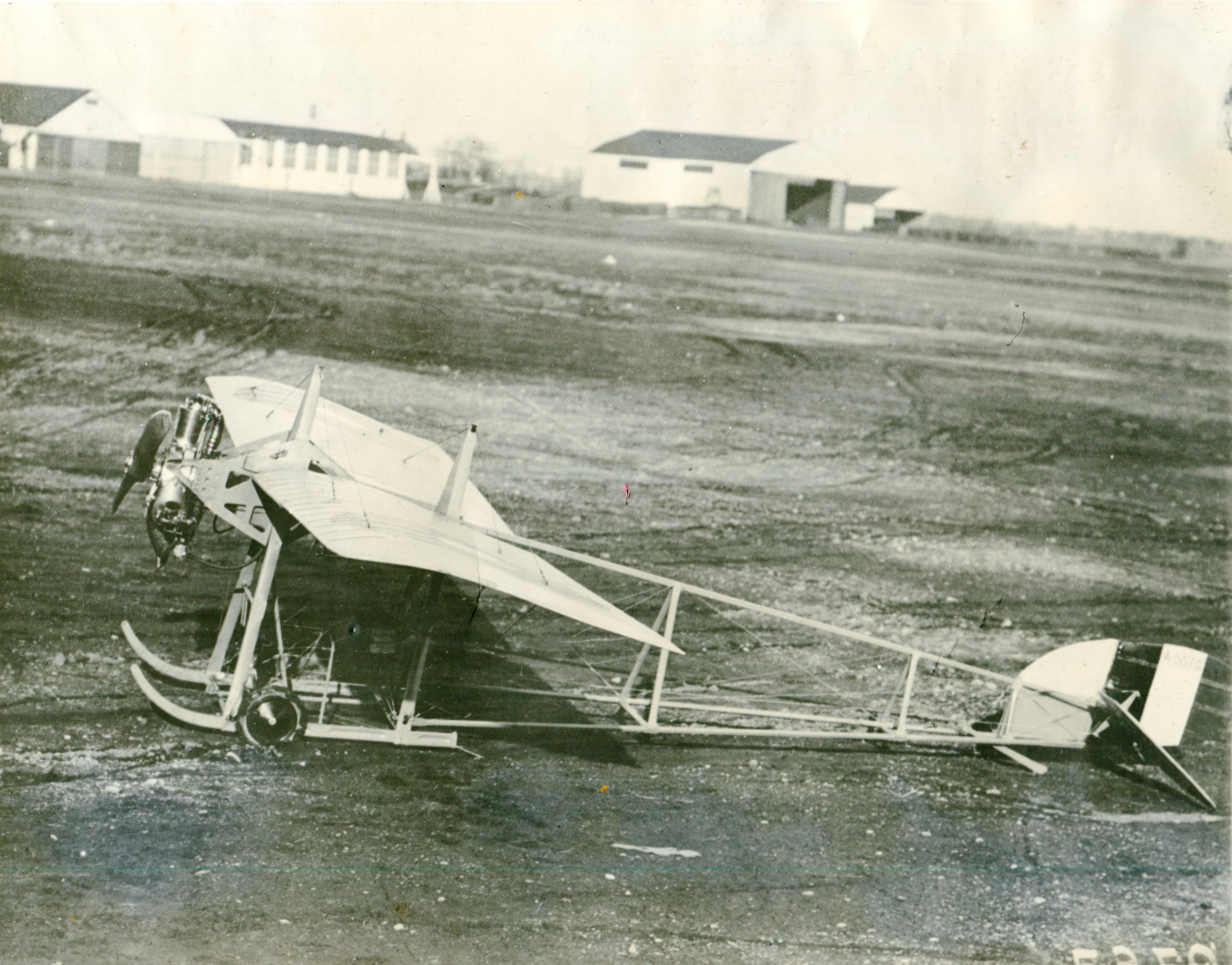
- SA-1

General information
- Role: Ship's spotter
- Manufacturer: Naval Aircraft Factory
- Designer: Naval Aircraft Factory
- Primary user: US Navy
- Number built: 4

History
- First flight: 1918

The Naval Aircraft Factory (NAF) SA was one of several new NAF designs during 1918, their first year of operation. It was a small aircraft designed to be launched from a platform erected on a battleship. The aircraft was to act as an observer, or spotter, to extend the visual range of the ship. SA stood for Ship's Airplane.

== Design ==
Of mainly wooden construction, the aircraft's fuselage consisted of an open wooden frame. Aft of the wing, this was of metal with a triangular cross-section, and supported a conventional tailplane with slab elevators and a low, extended rudder. The wooden monoplane wing was shoulder mounted and wire braced, with roll controlled by wing warping rather by the by then conventional ailerons. The undercarriage was of tailwheel type with a longeron fashioned as a skid beside each main wheel. The pilot sat in the fuselage between the wings. The major sections were designed to be stored aboard the ship, and to be quickly assembled for flight.

This design was critiqued by Peter M. Bowers who noted its resemblance to Santos-Dumont Demoiselle designs and its possible influence on the Aeronca C-2 and C-3. Bowers also pointed out that the aircraft would not have been able to land back on the ship, and, with no radio, would not be able to report its findings anyway.

== Variants ==
Four prototypes were built, in two versions:

SA-1
Original version. Two built, registered BuNo A5570 and A5571

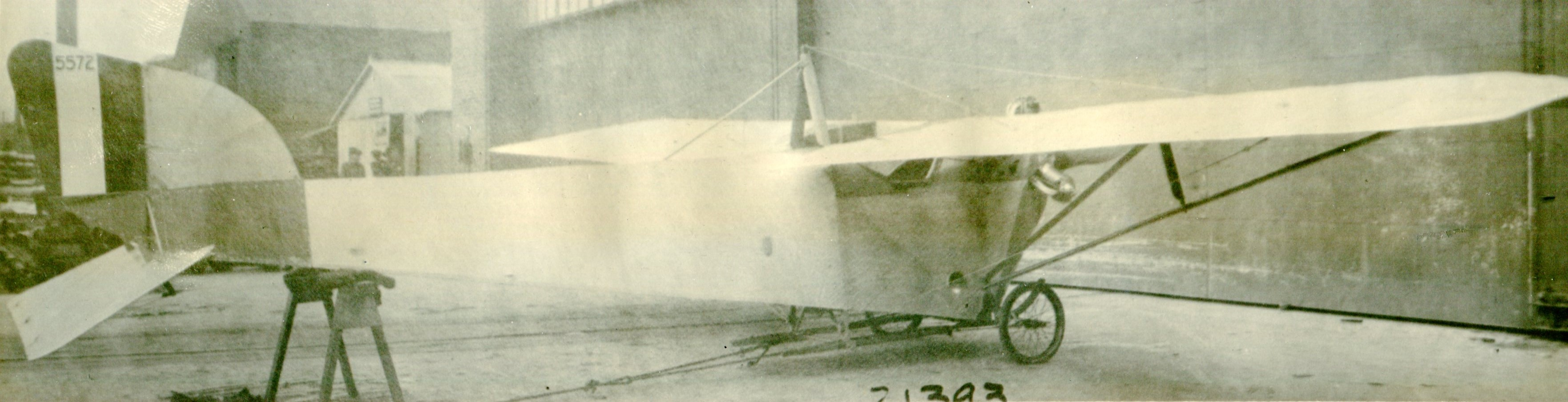
SA-2

SA-2
Fabric-covered fuselage with struts supporting the wings, which had a slightly greater span. One may have had the wing-warping replaced by ailerons. Registered BuNo A5572 and A5573.

== Operations ==
The aircraft were tested by the Navy, but there is no record of them being operated from a ship or used operationally. No orders were placed for further examples, and the fates of the prototypes are not recorded.

== Specifications (SA-1) ==
Data from and

General characteristics

- Crew: 1
- Length: 21 ft 8 in (6.60 m)
- Wingspan: 27 ft 8 in (8.43 m)
- Wing area: 144 sq ft (13.4 m^{2})
- Aspect ratio: 5.2
- Empty weight: 425 lb (193 kg)
- Gross weight: 695 lb (315 kg)
- Powerplant: 1 × Lawrance L-3 radial engine, 55 hp (41 kW) Three-cylinder, displacement 223 cubic inches (3,650 cc)
- Propellers: 2-bladed, 5 ft 1 in (1.55 m) diameter

Performance

- Wing loading: 4.8 lb/sq ft (23 kg/m^{2})
