= Lawrance J-1 =

J-1
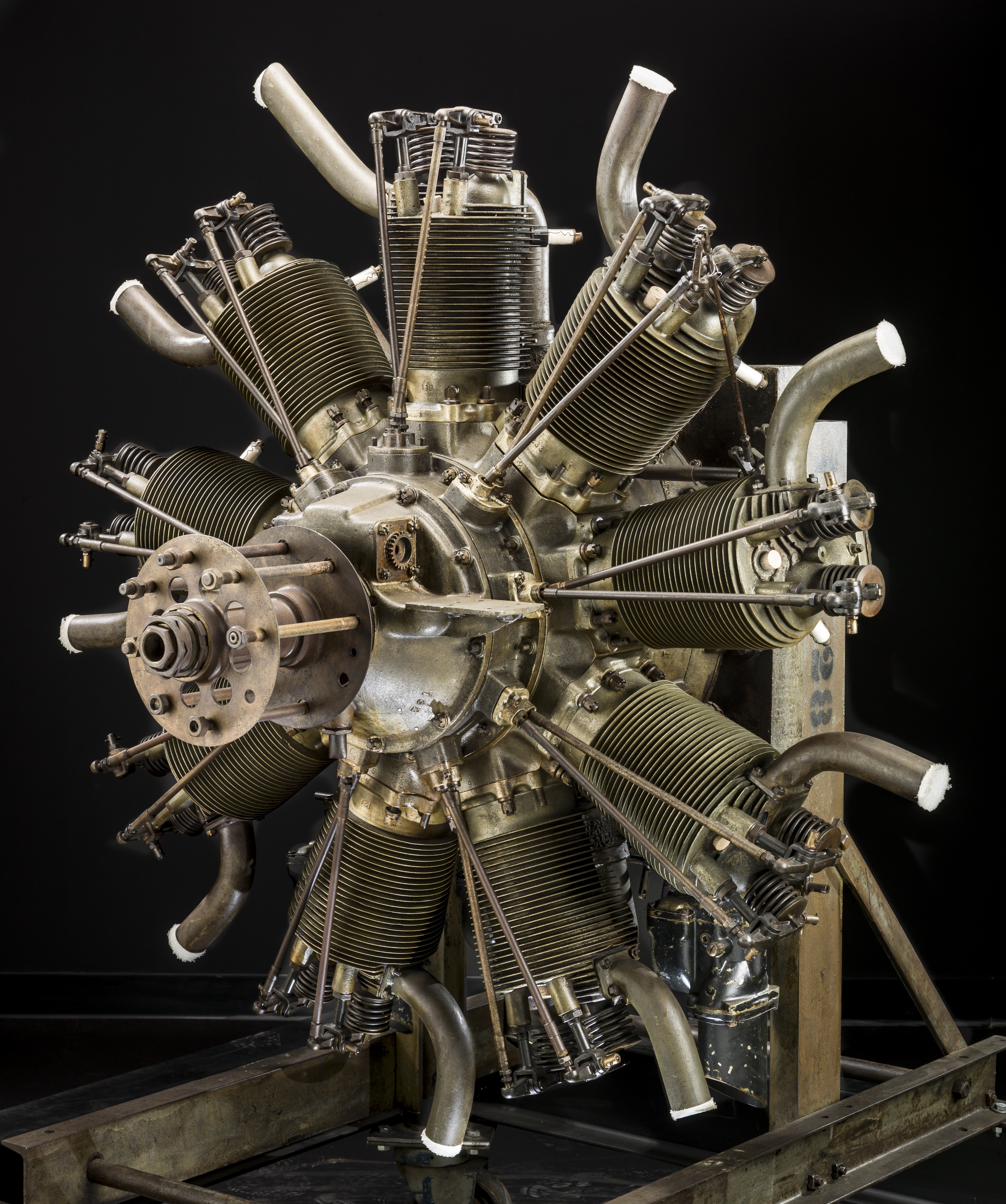
- Lawrance J-1 at the National Air and Space Museum
- Type: Piston aero engine
- National origin: United States
- Manufacturer: Lawrance Aero Engine Company

The Lawrance J-1 was an engine developed by Charles Lanier Lawrance and used in American aircraft in the early 1920s. It was a nine-cylinder, air-cooled radial design.

== Development ==
During World War I the Lawrance Aero Engine Company of New York City produced the crude opposed twins that powered the Penguin trainers, and the Lawrance L-1 60 hp Y-type radial.

After the end of World War I, the Lawrance engineers worked with both the Army and the Navy in developing their L-1 onto a nine-cylinder radial engine, which became the 200 hp Model J-1. It was the best American air-cooled engine at the time and passed its 50-hour test in 1922.

The U.S. Navy badly needed light, reliable engines for its carrierborne aircraft. As a means of pressuring Wright and other companies into developing radial engines, it gave a contract to Lawrance for 200 of the J-1 radial and ceased buying the liquid-cooled Wright-Hispano engines. At the urging of the Army and Navy the Wright Aeronautical Corporation bought the Lawrance Company, and subsequent engines were known as Wright radials. The Wright Whirlwind had essentially the same lower end (crankcase, cam, and crankshaft) as the J-1.

== Applications ==
- Dayton-Wright XPS-1
- Naval Aircraft Factory N2N
- Naval Aircraft Factory TS-1
- Huff-Daland TA-2 trainer prototype - one example only re-engined
- Huff-Daland TA-5 trainer prototype
- Huff-Daland TA-6 trainer prototype
- Huff-Daland HN-2 naval trainer

== Engines on display ==
The New England Air Museum in Windsor Locks, Connecticut, has a Lawrance J-1 on display.

== Specifications (J-1) ==
Data from A History of Aircraft Piston Engines

=== General characteristics ===
- Type: 9-cylinder air-cooled radial engine
- Bore: 4.5 in (114 mm)
- Stroke: 5.5 in (144 mm)
- Displacement: 787 in^{3} (12.9 L)
- Dry weight: 476 lb (216 kg)

=== Components ===
- Fuel system: Three carburetors
- Cooling system: Air-cooled

=== Performance ===
- Power output: 200 hp (150 kW)
- Power-to-weight ratio: 1:2.38

== See also ==
- ABC Dragonfly, contemporary production British air-cooled nine-cylinder aviation radial, unsuccessful in service.
