= Curtiss CS =

Aircraft

CS / SC
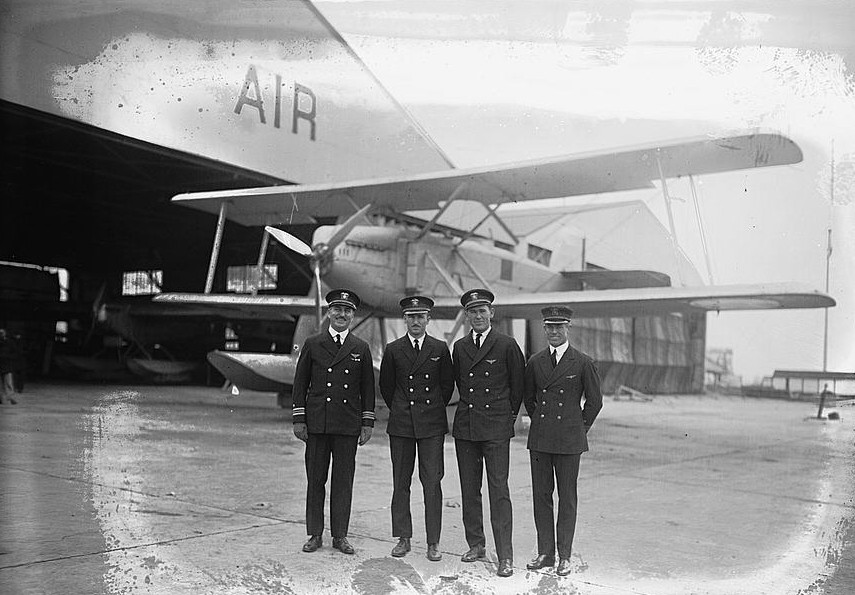

General information
- Type: Reconnaissance and torpedo bomber aircraft
- Manufacturer: Curtiss Aeroplane Company, Martin
- Primary user: United States Navy
- Number built: 83

History
- First flight: 1923

The Curtiss CS (or Model 31) was a reconnaissance and torpedo bomber aircraft used by the United States Navy during the 1920s. It was a large single-engine biplane with single-bay unstaggered wings, the design conventional in all respects other than that the lower wing was of greater span than the upper. The CS was built to allow its undercarriage to be quickly and easily interchangeable between wheeled, tailskid undercarriage, and twin pontoons for operation from water. Provision for the carriage of a torpedo was semi-recessed into the underside of the fuselage, blended in behind an aerodynamic fairing. The pilot and gunner sat in tandem open cockpits, while accommodation inside the fuselage was provided for a third crewmember who served as bombardier and radio operator. This station was also provided with a dorsal hatch aft of the gunner's position, and a ventral blister aft of the torpedo recess, which was used for aiming bombs or torpedoes.

== Development ==
Curtiss produced six CS-1 prototypes for the Navy in 1923, which were mostly used for engine tests. Two examples of the improved CS-2 were built the following year and set a number of world speed, distance, and endurance records for seaplanes in its class. The Navy ordered both the CS-1 and CS-2 into production, but when Curtiss tendered with a price of $32,000 per aircraft, Martin undercut them with a tender of $25,200 for each CS-1 and $19,863 for each CS-2 and won the contract. Curtiss refused to provide full sets of drawings and data to Martin, so Martin-built machines were in part reverse-engineered from a Curtiss-built CS-1 provided by the Navy. By the time the Martin-produced aircraft were delivered in 1925–26, the Navy's designation system had changed, and they entered service as the SC-1 and SC-2. Martin-built SC-2s suffered from poor handling characteristics and soon earned the nickname "Sea Cow". Meanwhile, the Naval Aircraft Factory made extensive modifications to the two Curtiss CS-2s leading them to be redesignated CS-3. Further development of the design was carried out by Martin as the T3M and T4M, and eventually by Great Lakes as the TG.

== Operational history ==
In 1924, the CS-2 was used to break numerous world records for seaplanes in its class in three long-range flights. The first of these took place overnight between 22 and 23 June, when Lt Frank Wead and Lt John D. Price set five records – distance (963.123 mi, 1,544.753 km), duration (13 hours, 23 minutes, 15 seconds), speed over 500 km (73.41 mph, 117.74 km/h), speed over 1,000 km (74.27 mph, 119.12 km/h) and speed over 1,500 km (74.17 mph/118.96 km/h). Between 11 and 12 July, the same pilots broke the distance and duration records again (994.19 mi/1,594.58 km over 14 hours, 53 minutes, 44 seconds). On October 10, these same two records were exceeded by Lt Andrew Crinkley and Lt Rossmore Lyon in a flight of 1,460 miles (2,350 km) in 20 hours, 28 minutes. While these would have been new world records, the flight was not officially timed and was therefore not recognized as such.

On 23 October 1925, the U.S. Navy brought 23 CS-1 floatplanes to Bay Shore Park on the Chesapeake Bay, 14 miles (23 km) from Baltimore, Maryland, with the intention of flying them in an air show demonstration before the 1925 Schneider Cup Race on 24 October. Due to bad weather, the race was postponed until 26 October, and the CS-1s remained at the park to await the postponed race. While they waited, a storm with 80-mile-per-hour (129 km/h) winds struck the area early on 25 October. The gale-force winds broke 3-inch (76 mm) mooring and anchor ropes on 17 of the biplanes, which were blown onto shore or dashed against seawalls, destroying seven and damaging 10 of them. The 26 October afternoon edition of the Baltimore Evening Sun had the headline "Plane Disaster in Harbor Called Hard Blow to Navy" and quoted United States Army Air Service Brigadier General William "Billy" Mitchell, who called the loss of the CS-1s "staggering" and blamed it on U.S. Navy mismanagement of its aviation program.

== Variants ==
Curtiss CS-1
Initial prototypes/production, powered by 530 hp (395 kW) Wright T-2 engine. Six built by Curtiss.
Curtiss CS-2
Improved version with 600 hp (448 kW) Wright T-3 engine and more fuel. One converted from CS-1 and two new-built aircraft by Curtiss.
Curtiss CS-3
Modified CS-2, with geared engine. One converted. Formed basis of Martin T3M.

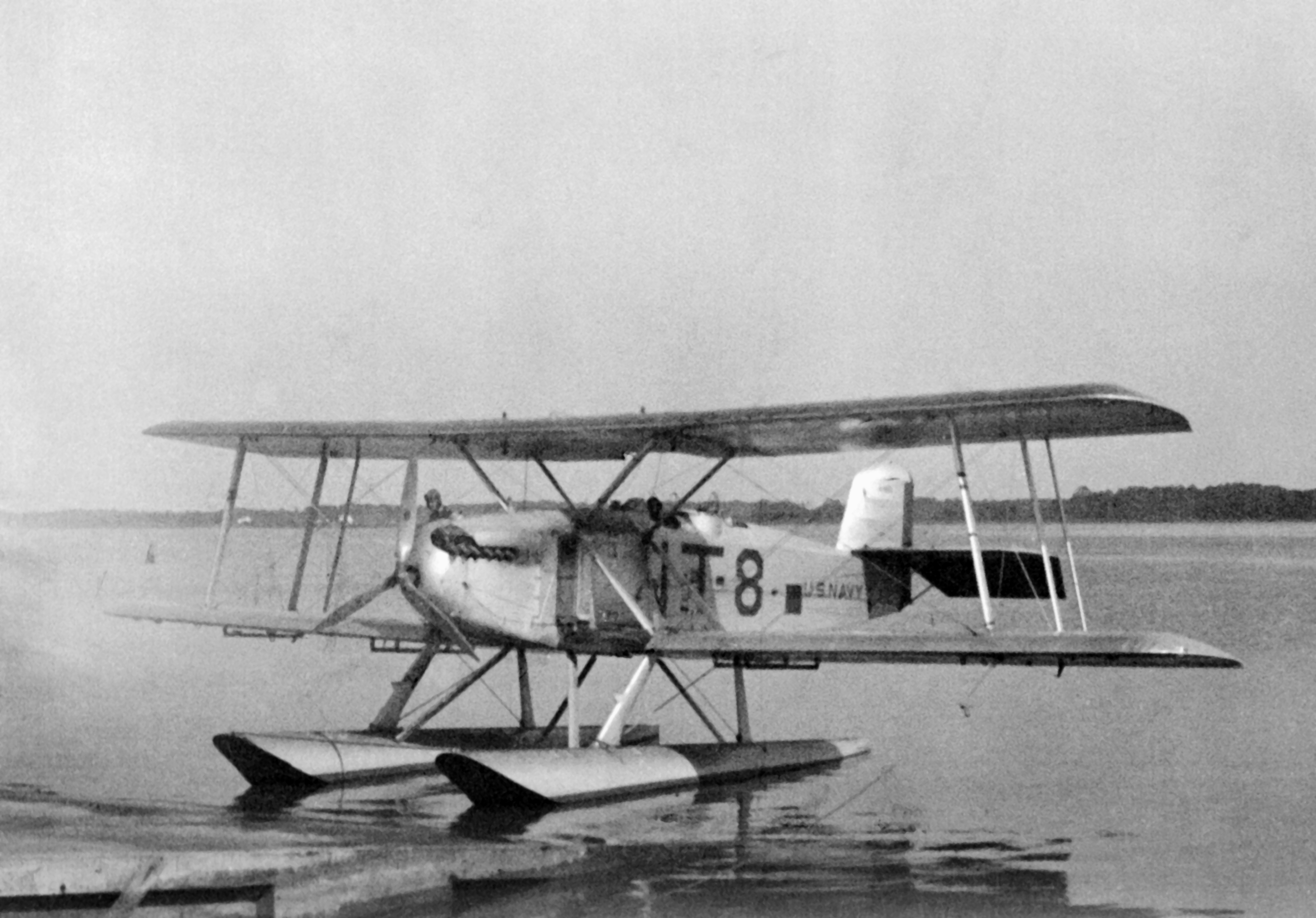
Martin SC-1 at Langley

Martin SC-1
Martin built production version of CS-1. 35 built.
Martin SC-2
Martin built production version of CS-2. 40 built.
Martin T2M
Alternative designation for the Martin built SC series.
Martin XSC-6
Conversion of SC-1 with 730 hp (545 kW) Packard 1A-2500 engine.
Martin SC-6
SC-1 fitted with 1A-2500 engine.
XSC-7
Conversion of CS-1 with T-3A engine and increased gross weight.

== Operators ==
United States

- United States Navy

== Specifications (SC-2 landplane) ==
Data from United States Navy Aircraft since 1911

General characteristics

- Crew: three
- Length: 37 ft 9 in (11.51 m)
- Wingspan: 56 ft 7 in (17.25 m)
- Height: 14 ft 8 in (4.47 m)
- Wing area: 856 sq ft (79.5 m^{2})
- Empty weight: 5,007 lb (2,271 kg)
- Gross weight: 8,422 lb (3,820 kg)
- Powerplant: 1 × Wright T-3 water-cooled V12 engine, 585 hp (436 kW)

Performance

- Maximum speed: 103 mph (166 km/h, 90 kn) at sea level
- Range: 1,018 mi (1,638 km, 885 nmi)
- Service ceiling: 8,000 ft (2,400 m)
- Time to altitude: 10 minutes to 2,000 ft (610 m)

Armament

- Guns: 1 × rearward-firing machine gun in ring mount
- Bombs: 1 × 1,618 lb (734 kg) torpedo
