= Huff-Daland TW-5 =

1923 biplane trainer aircraft

TW-5
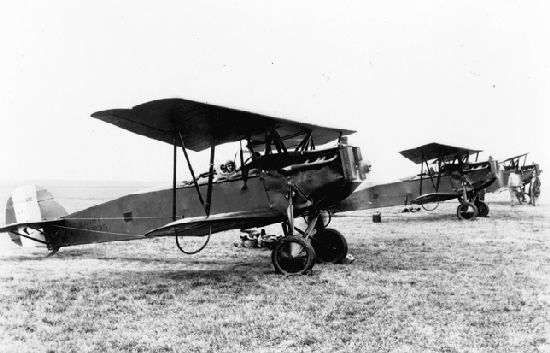
- AT-1s

General information
- Type: Trainer
- Manufacturer: Huff-Daland
- Primary users: United States Army Air Service United States Navy
- Number built: 26

History
- Manufactured: 1923

The Huff-Daland Type XV Training Water-Cooled TW-5 was a biplane trainer designed by the Huff-Daland Aero Corporation in the early 1920s for the United States Army Air Service.

== Design and development ==
It was a development of the TA-6 (which itself was a one-off redesigned TA-2 with a 220 hp Lawrance J-1 air-cooled engine) but powered by a 190 hp Wright-Hispano E2. In 1924, the designation system was revised, and the TW-5 became an Advanced Trainer AT-1. In 1927, Huff-Daland Aero Corporation became a division of Keystone Aircraft Corporation.

== Operational history ==
Versions of the AT-1 were built for the United States Navy as training and observation aircraft.

== Variants ==
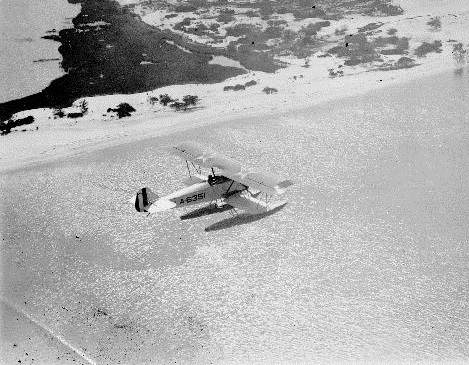
HN-1

TA-6 (Trainer, Air-cooled type 6)
Powered by the 200 hp Lawrance J-1 air-cooled engine, 1 built
TW-5 (Trainer, Water-cooled type 5)
Powered by the 150-hp (112-kW) Wright-Hispano I engine, 5 built.
AT-1
U.S. Army Advanced Trainer, 10 built.
AT-2
One aircraft tested in a number of single-seat and two-seat versions
HN-1
United States Navy version of the AT-1 powered by a 180hp Wright-Hispano E2 engine, 3 built.
HN-2
United States Navy version of the AT-1 powered by a 200hp Lawrance J-1, 3 built.
HO-1
United States Navy observation version of the HN-1 powered by a 180hp Wright-Hispano E2 engine with interchangeable wheel or float undercarriage, 3 built

== Operators ==
United States

- United States Army Air Service
- United States Navy

== Specifications (AT-1) ==
General characteristics

- Crew: 2
- Length: 24 ft 7 in (7.5 m)
- Wingspan: 31 ft 2 in (9.5 m)
- Gross weight: 2,358 lb (1,070 kg)
- Powerplant: 1 × Wright Hisso I V-8 water-cooled piston engine, 150 hp (110 kW)

Performance

- Maximum speed: 112 mph (180 km/h, 97 kn)

== See also ==
Related development

- Huff-Daland TA-2
- Huff-Daland TA-6
