= Dayton-Wright XO-3 =

American observation aircraft prototype

XO-3

General information
- Type: Observation
- National origin: United States
- Manufacturer: Dayton-Wright
- Status: Canceled

The Dayton-Wright XO-3 was an aircraft project developed by Dayton-Wright in 1924.

== Design and development ==
A contemporary of the successful Douglas O-2, it was an orthodox two seat biplane, powered by a 645 horsepower (481 kW) Wright T-3 V12 engine. The prototype, numbered 23-1254, built by Wright Aeronautical after the demise of Dayton-wright, was allocated the Wright field number P-376.

== Operational history ==
After trials at Wright Field the XO-3 was rejected and returned to Wright Aeronautical, where it saw service as an engine test-bed, primarily for the Wright R-1750 Cyclone, with the civil registration X-1087. Officially it was named Mohawk by Wright, but unofficially it received the sobriquet Iron Horse.

== Specifications (XO-3) ==
Data from General Dynamics Aircraft and Their Predecessors

General characteristics

- Crew: 2/3
- Powerplant: 1 × Wright T-3 Tornado V-12 water-cooled piston engine, 645 hp (481 kW)
