= Lawrance A-3 =

Twin-cylinder aircraft piston engine

A-3/Model A
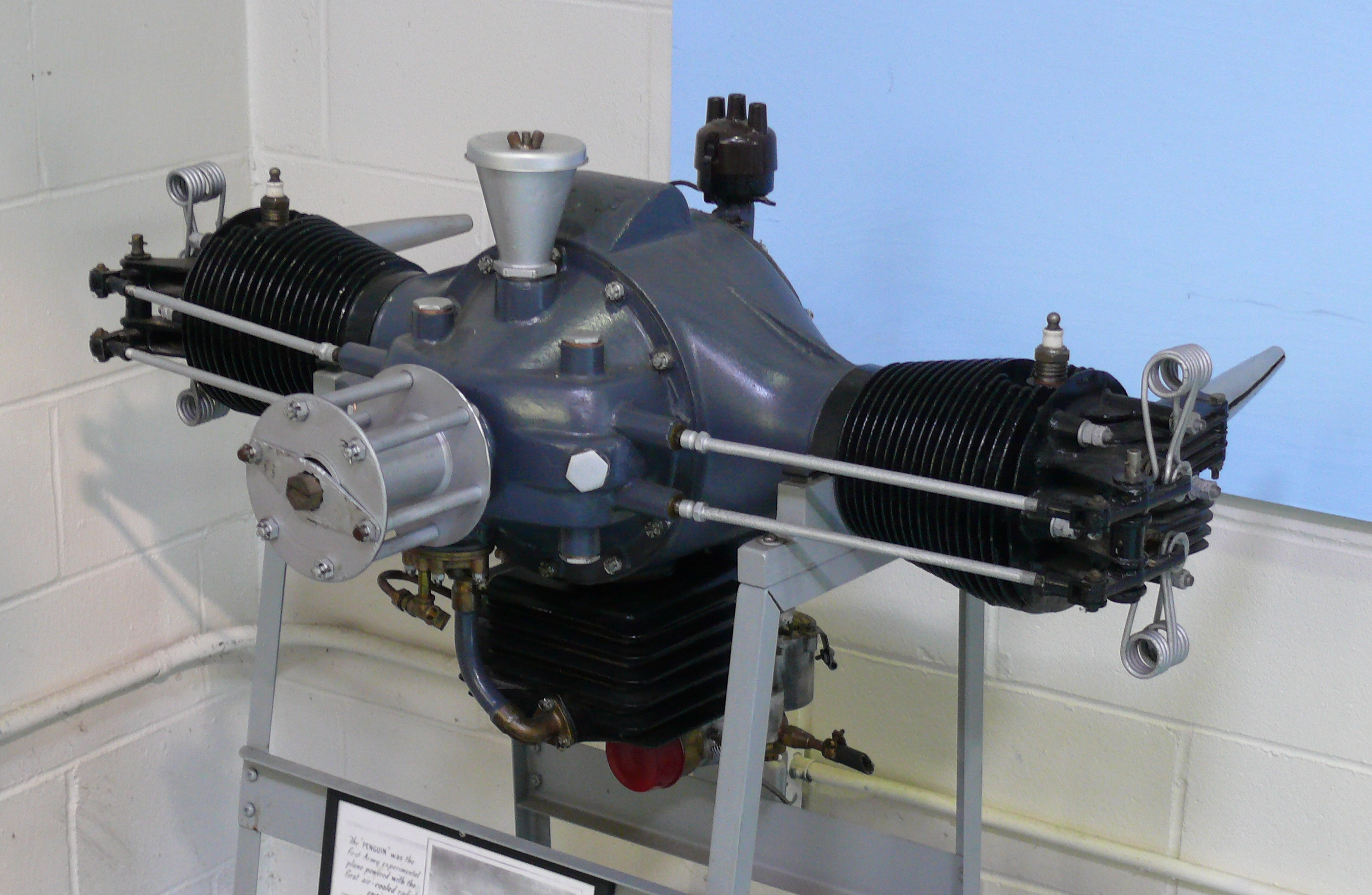
- Lawrance Model A engine on display at the Aviation Hall of Fame and Museum of New Jersey
- Type: Piston aero engine
- National origin: United States
- Manufacturer: Lawrance Aero Engine Company
- Designer: Charles Lawrance
- First run: c. 1916
- Manufactured: c. 450

The Lawrance A-3 or Lawrance Model A was an American twin-cylinder aircraft piston engine. Designed by Charles Lawrance in the mid-1910s the engine was produced by the Lawrance Aero Engine Company and under license by Excelsior. Weighing 200 lb (90 kg) the engine produced 28 horsepower (21 kW). A feature of this engine was the shared use of a single crankpin for both cylinders, this caused vibration as the pistons moved in the same direction.

== Applications ==
- Breese Penguin (flightless ground training aircraft)
- Driggs Dart
- Mummert Cootie
- Ortego Helicopter
- Shinnecock lightplane
- Swanson SS-3
- Waco Cootie I (monoplane)
- Waco Cootie II (biplane)

== Engines on display ==
- A Lawrance A-3 is on public display at the Aerospace Museum of California

== Specifications ==
Data from Gunston.

=== General characteristics ===
- Type: Two-cylinder, air-cooled horizontally opposed piston aircraft engine
- Dry weight: 200 lb (91 kg)

=== Components ===
- Cooling system: Air-cooled

=== Performance ===
- Power output: 28 hp (21 kW) at 1400 rpm

== See also ==
Comparable engines

- Aeronca E-107
- Bristol Cherub

Related lists

- List of aircraft engines
