= Huff-Daland TA-2 =

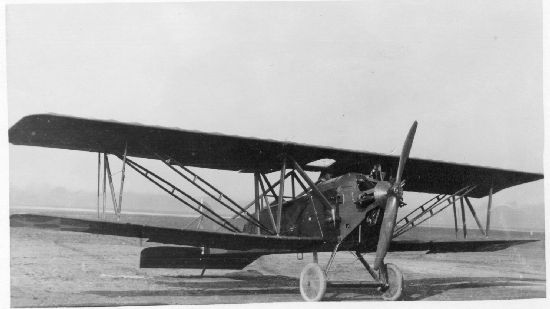

General information
- Type: Trainer
- Manufacturer: Huff-Daland
- Primary user: United States Army Air Service
- Number built: 3

History
- Variants: Huff-Daland TA-6

The Huff-Daland TA-2 was an American biplane trainer designed by the Huff-Daland Aero Corporation in the early 1920s for the United States Army Air Service.

== Design and development ==
The TA-2 was a development of the Huff-Daland HD.4 Bridget with a 140 hp (100 kW) ABC Wasp radial engine. Three prototypes (one for static tests and two fliers) were ordered for evaluation at McCook Field. The two flying examples were later rebuilt with a re-designed fuselage, balanced rudder, smaller wings and a 90 hp (67 kW) Curtiss OX-5 engine. One aircraft was later re-engined with a Lawrance J-1 radial engine.

The TA-2 was re-designed with a 200 hp (150 kW) Lawrance J-1 engine and re-designated the Huff-Daland AT-6, one prototype only was built.

== Operators ==
United States

- United States Army Air Service

== Specifications (TA-2) ==
Data from American airplanes: Huff-Daland

General characteristics

- Crew: 2
- Length: 24 ft 2 in (7.37 m)
- Wingspan: 30 ft 10 in (9.40 m)
- Gross weight: 1,765 lb (801 kg)
- Powerplant: 1 × ABC Wasp 7-cyl. air-cooled radial piston engine, 170 hp (130 kW)
