= Wright Aeronautical =

American aircraft maker (1919–1929)

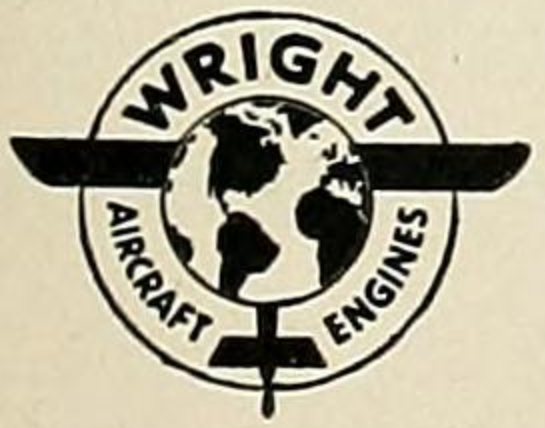
- Predecessor: Wright-Martin
- Founded: 1919
- Defunct: 1929 (remained a division)
- Fate: Merged
- Successor: Curtiss-Wright
- Key people: Charles Lawrance
- Parent: Curtiss-Wright (after 1929)

Wright Aeronautical (1919–1929) was an American aircraft manufacturer headquartered in Paterson, New Jersey. It was the successor corporation to Wright-Martin. It built aircraft and was a supplier of aircraft engines to other builders in the golden age of aviation. Wright engines were used by Amelia Earhart and Charles Lindbergh. In 1929, the company merged with Curtiss Aeroplane and Motor Corporation to form Curtiss-Wright.

== History ==
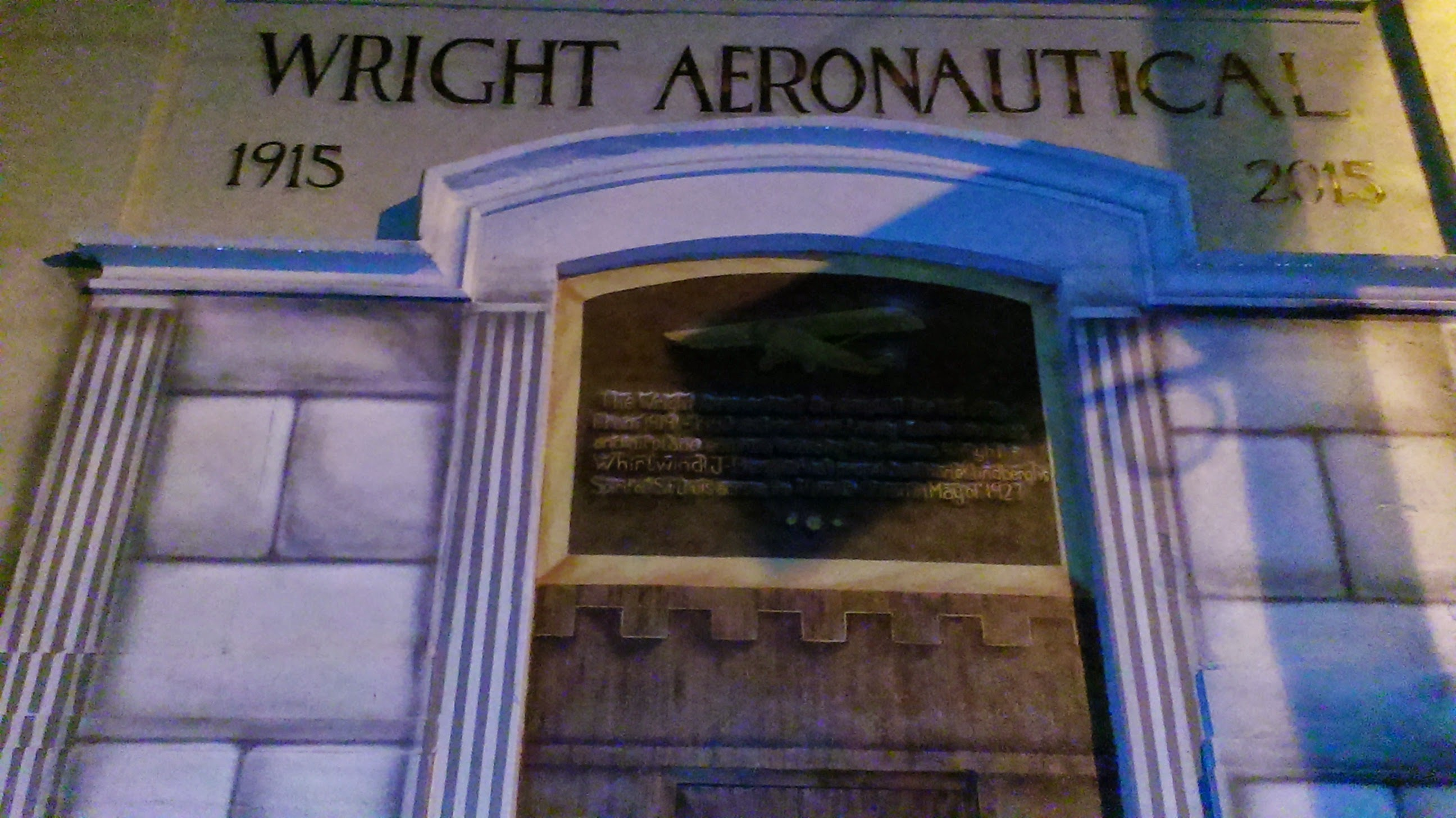
Wright Aeronautical building, November 2014

In 1916, the Wright brothers' original aviation firm, the Wright Company, merged with Glenn L. Martin's firm, the Glenn L. Martin Company of California, to form the Wright-Martin Aircraft Corporation. In September 1917, Martin resigned from Wright-Martin and re-formed an independent Glenn L. Martin Company of Ohio (later of Maryland). After World War I in 1919, Wright-Martin was renamed Wright Aeronautical. It moved to Paterson, New Jersey in 1919.

In February 1919, an airplane with a Wright engine broke the world's speed record at 163 2/3 miles (263.4 km) per hour. In November 1920, an airplane with a 300-horsepower Wright engine came in second place in the first Pulitzer Trophy Race in Long Island, New York. Other planes using Wright engines came in fourth and fifth place in the race.

In 1920, Wright produced a cannon engine for the Army that allowed shells to be fired through the airplane's propeller. In 1921, a 300 horsepower engine by Wright again came in second place at the Pulitzer Trophy Race in Omaha, Nebraska. In 1921, Wright developed a new six-cylinder dirigible engine with 400 horsepower, testing it for nine months. In 1922, a plane with a Wright H-2 engine won the Mitchell Trophy Race.

In May 1923, Wright Aeronautical purchased the Lawrance Aero Engine Company, acquiring Charles Lawrance's J-1 radial engine. Lawrance became a vice president of Wright. In 1925, Wright's president, Frederick B. Rentschler, left the company to found Pratt & Whitney Aircraft Company; Lawrance replaced him as company president. Rentschler poached several talented personnel from Wright to join his new firm.

Working off Lawrance's designs, Wright Aeronautical developed an air-cooled engine, the Model J Whirlwind series. In 1925, a Wright-Bellanca airplane won the Pulitzer Trophy Race using a Wright Whirlwind engine. In 1927, a Wright J-5C Whirlwind engine was used by Charles Lindbergh in the Spirit of St. Louis when he flew from New York City to Paris. Wright engines were also used by other famed aviators, including Richard E. Byrd, Clarence Chamberlin, and Amelia Earhart.

Wright Aeronautical merged with the Curtiss Aeroplane and Motor Company on July 5, 1929, to become the Curtiss-Wright Corporation. Their engine divisions merged in 1931.

During World War II, the Paterson plant had 24,000 employees, working in three daily shifts. They made some 75,000 engines for the North American B-25, the Boeing B-17, and other aircraft. Wright also made engines for 44 commercial airlines and rocket engines for space travel. However, the Paterson plant closed in 1946.

== Products ==
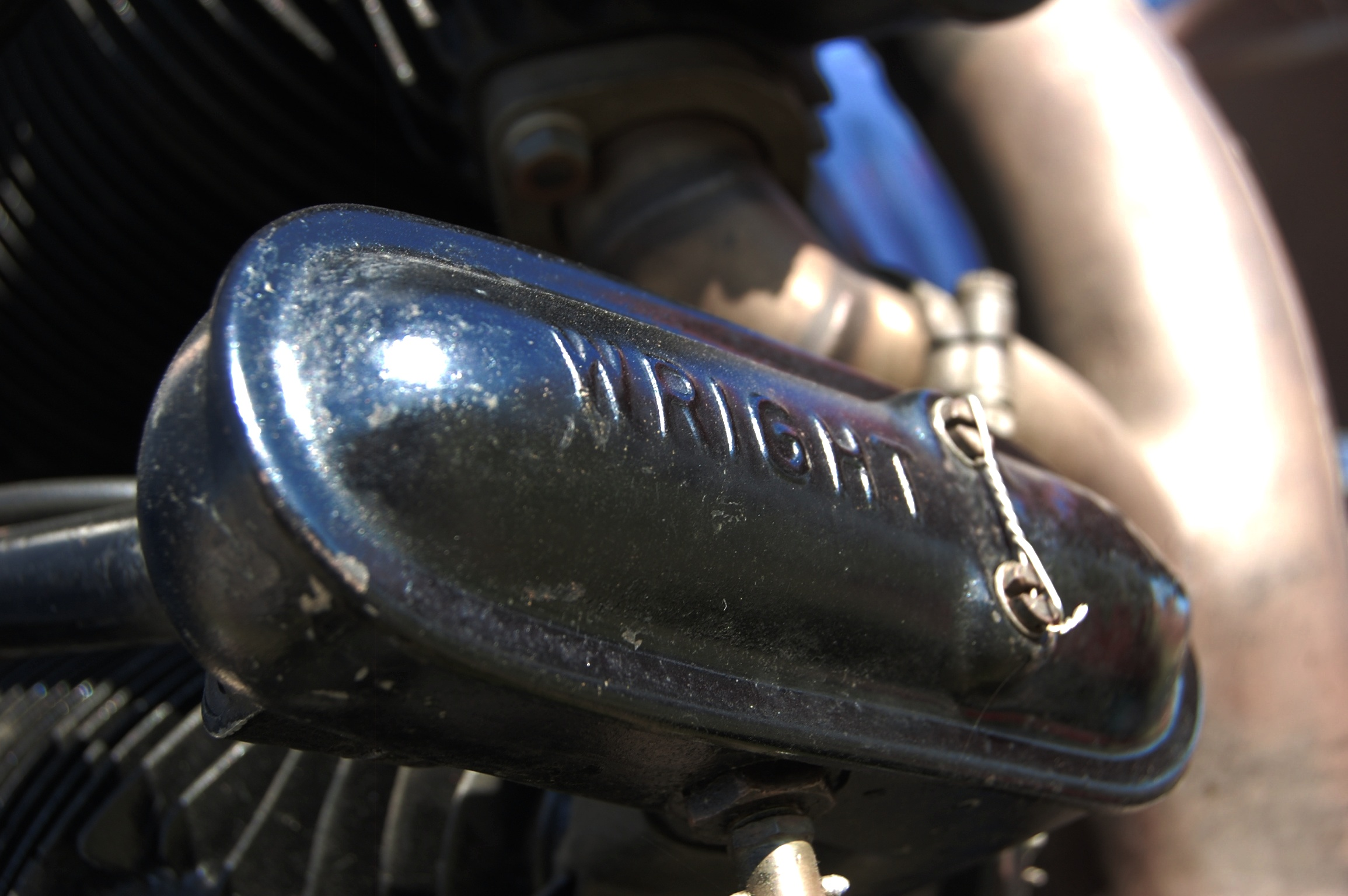
The Wright name on the rocker cover of one of their radial engines

=== Aircraft ===
Model name	First flight	Number built	Type
Wright F2W	1923	2	Single-engine biplane racer
Dayton-Wright XO-3		1	Single-engine biplane observation airplane
Wright XF3W	1926	1	Single-engine biplane racer
Navy-Wright NW-1	1922	2	Single-engine monoplane racer
Navy-Wright NW-2	1922	1	Single-engine biplane racer
Wright-Bellanca WB-1	1925	1	Single-engine monoplane utility airplane
Wright-Bellanca WB-2 Columbia	1926	1	Single-engine monoplane utility airplane
Bellanca 77-140 Bomber	1934		Twin-engine monoplane bomber
Wright WP-1	1922	1	License built a single-engine monoplane fighter

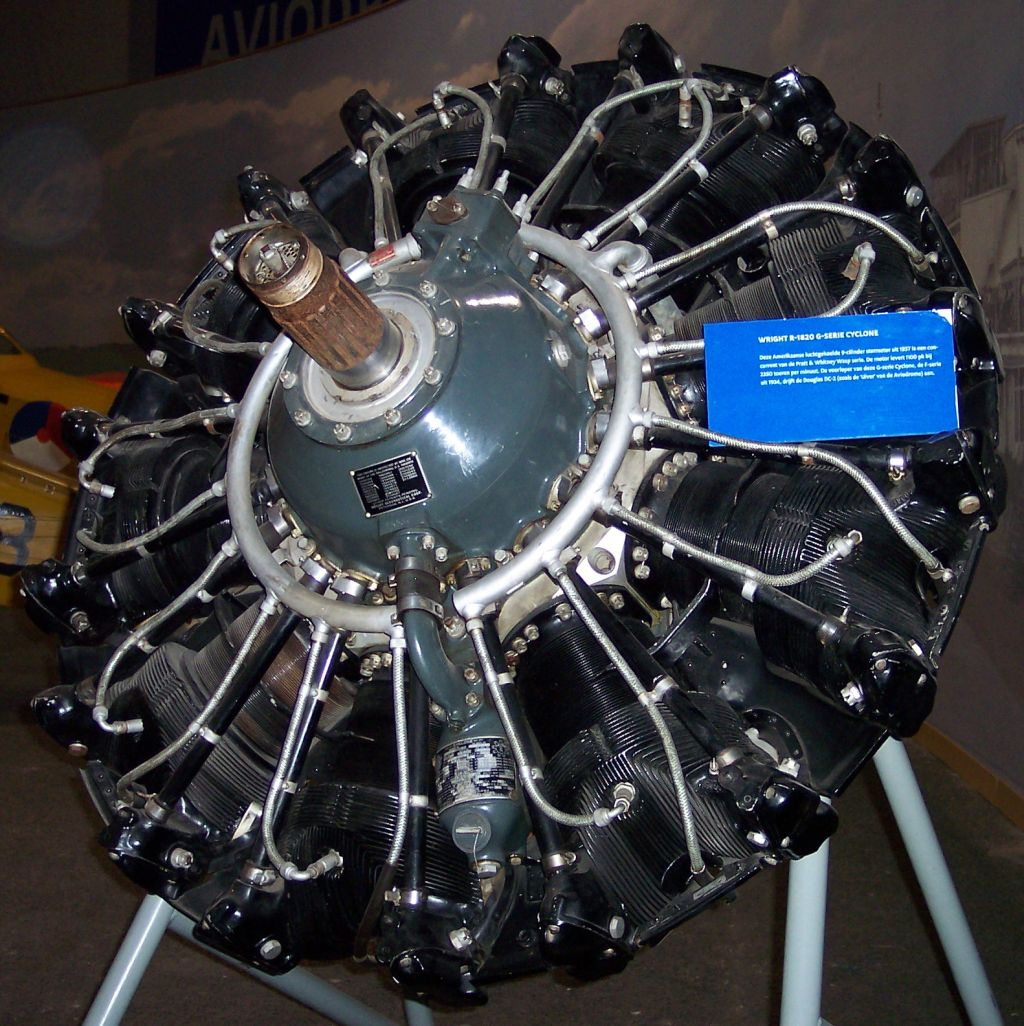
Wright R-1820

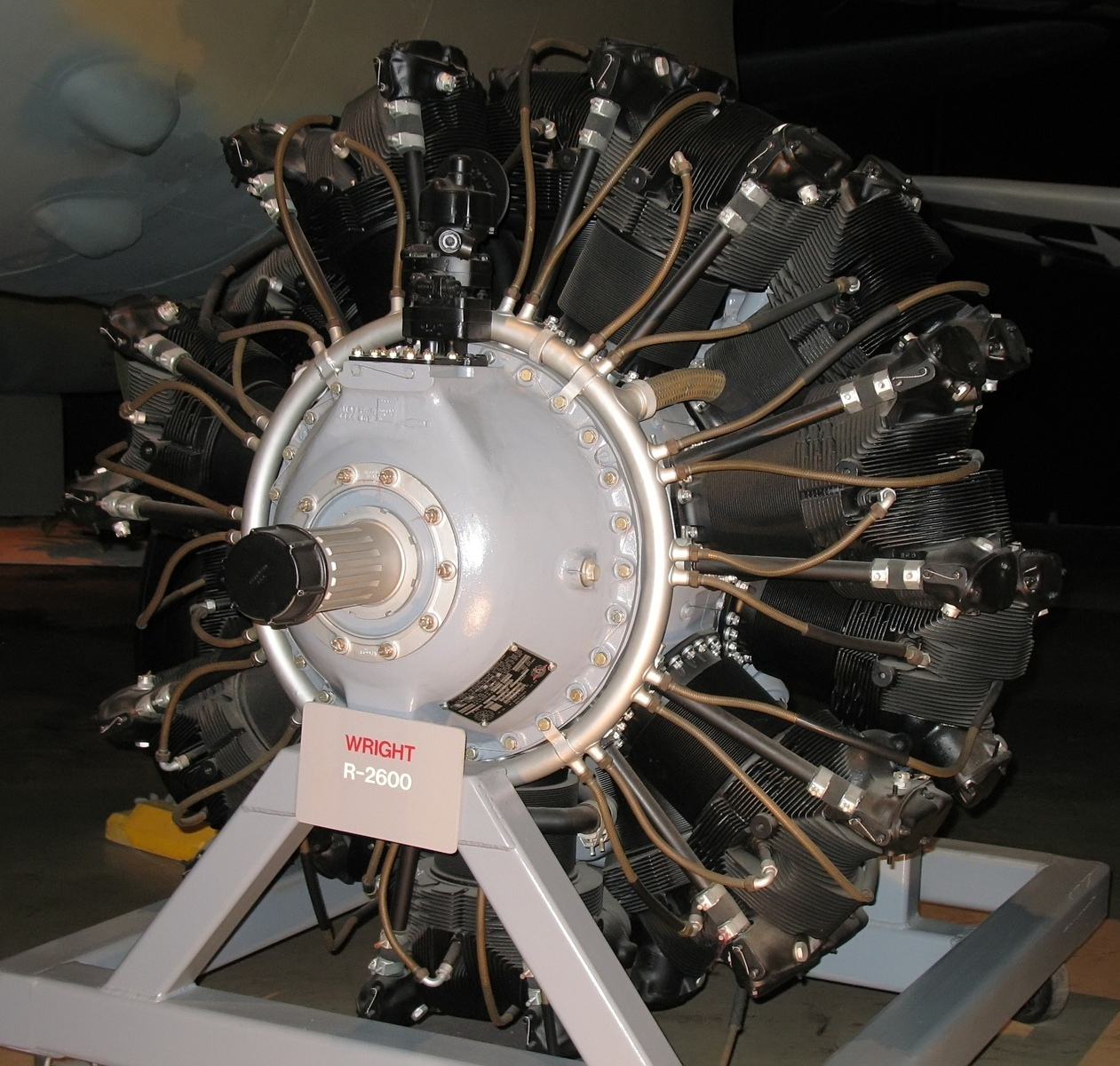
Wright R-2600

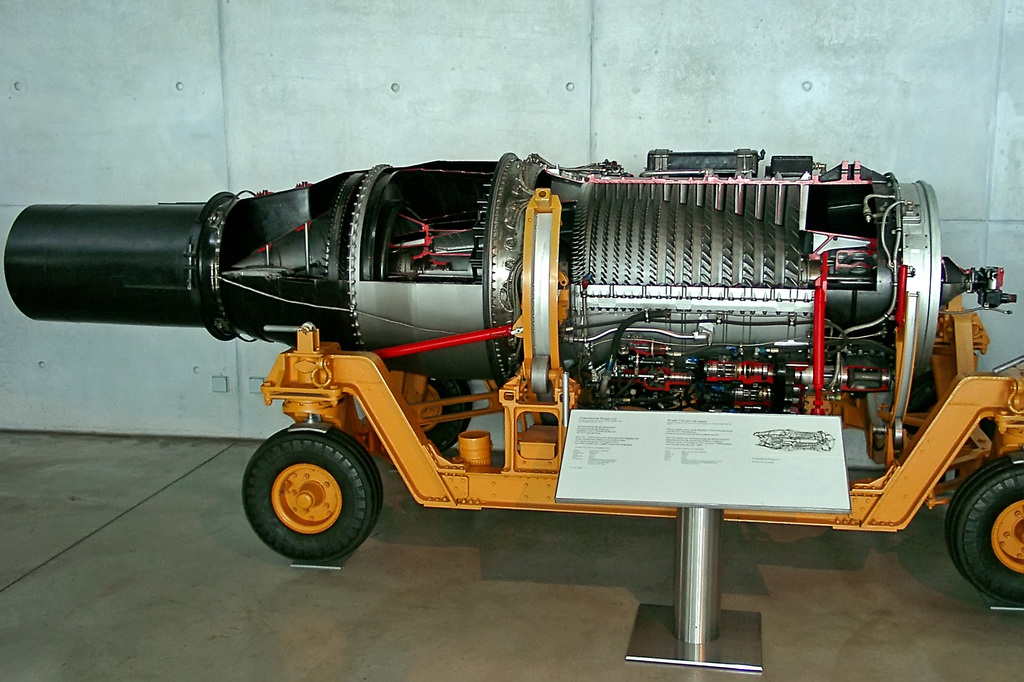
Wright J65

=== Aircraft engines ===
Model name	Introduced	Type	Horsepower	Cooling	Reference
Wright A	circa 1919	V-8	150	liquid	
Wright B		V-4	75	liquid	
Wright C		V-8	200	liquid	
Wright D		V-8	200	liquid	
Wright D-1	1920	L-6	350	liquid	
Wright E	1919	V-8	150	liquid	
Wright E-1M Hurricane	1925 – 1926	V-8	240	marine	
Wright E-2	Before 1921	V-8	180	liquid	
Wright E-3		V-8	189	liquid	
Wright E-4 Tempest	1922 – 1923	V-8	200	liquid	
Wright E-4M Gold Cup		V-8	200-240	marine	
Wright F		V-9	150	liquid	
Wright H	1920		300	liquid	
Wright H-2	1920	V-8	320	liquid	
Wright H-2 Super Fighter	Before 1921		360	liquid	
Wright H-3	Before 1921	V-8	300	liquid	
Wright H-3 Super Fighter	Before 1921		360	liquid	
Wright I	1920		150	liquid	
Wright J-I	1923			air	
Wright J-3	1924	R-9	200	air	
Wright J-4 Whirlwind	1924	R-9	200	air	
Wright J-4B Whirlwind	1925	R-9	200	air	
Wright J-5 Whirlwind / Wright R-790	1925 – 1926	R-9	200	air	
Wright J-6 Whirlwind 5 / Wright R-540	1928 – 1930	R-5	165-175	air	
Wright J-6 Whirlwind 7 / Wright R-760	1925	R-7	225-320	air	
Wright J-6 Whirlwind 9 / Wright R-975	1928	R-9	300-420	air	
Wright J-6 Cyclone	circa 1928		525	air	
Wright K				liquid	
Wright K-2				liquid	
Wright L-3 Gale	circa 1923	R-3	60	air	
Wright L-4 Gale	circa 1923	R-3	60	air	
Wright P-1	1925	R-9	406	air	
Wright P-2	1925 – 1926	R-9	435	air	
Wright R-1	1920 – 1923	R-9	350	air	
Wright R-1200 Simoon	1925 – 1926	R-9	325	air	
Wright R-1300 Cyclone	1939	R-7	600	air	
Wright R-1510 Whirlwind	1933	R-14	600	air	
Wright R-1670 Whirlwind	circa 1935	R-14	800	air	
Wright R-1750 Cyclone	1927 – 1930	R-9	525	air	
Wright R-1820 Cyclone	1931	R-9	1,000	air	
Wright R-2160 Tornado	1940	R-42	2,350	air	
Wright R-2600	1937	R-14	1,750	air	
Wright R-3350 Cyclone	1937	R-18	2,200	air	
Wright R-4090 Cyclone	1940s	R-22	3,000	air	
Wright T		V-12	525	liquid	
Wright T-1 Tornado		V-12	600	liquid	
Wright T-1M Typhoon	1924	V-12	500	marine	
Wright T-2 Tornado	1922 – 1923	V-12	525	liquid	
Wright T-3 Tornado / Wright V-1950	1923	V-12	675	liquid	
Wright T-3A	1924 – 1925	V-12	525	liquid	
Wright T-3M Typhoon			600	marine	
Wright V-1460	1928	V-12	600	liquid or air	
Wright V-1560	1929 – 1930	V-12	600	air	
Wright Gipsy	1929 – 1931	L-4	85	air	
Wright-Gipsy L-320	1927	L-4	98	air	
Wright Morehouse WM-80	1926	O-2	29	air	
Wright J65	1951	Turbojet	7,239 lbf		
Wright J67	1950s, not produced	Turbojet	est. 15,000 lbf		
Wright TJ32					
Wright TJ38 Zephur	not produced	Turbojet			

== See also ==
- Wright Company
- Curtiss-Wright

== More information ==
- Eden, Paul; Moeng, Soph, eds. (2002). The Complete Encyclopedia of World Aircraft. Bradley's Close, 74-77 White Lion Street, London, NI 9PF: Amber Books Ltd. ISBN 0-7607-3432-1.
