= Wright F2W =

American racing aircraft

F2W
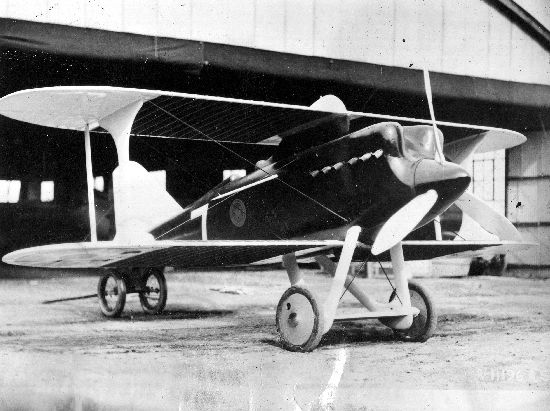

General information
- Type: Racer
- National origin: United States
- Manufacturer: Wright Aeronautical Corporation
- Status: Destroyed
- Number built: 2

History
- First flight: 2 August 1923

The Wright F2W was an American racing aircraft built by Wright Aeronautical Corporation for the US Navy.

== Development and design ==
The F2W was ordered by the US Navy to enter in the 1923 Pulitzer Trophy. Wright built the aircraft primarily of wood, covered in fabric, and was powered by the Wright T-3 Tornado engine. The first F2W flew for the first time on 2 August 1923.

== Operational history ==
During the Pulitzer Race, the first F2W ran out of fuel and crashed. The second F2W, which carried twice as much fuel, finished third at 230.06 mph (370.25 km/h). It was later converted into a floatplane as the F2W-2 to take part in the 1924 Schneider Trophy race. During testing it was very unstable, and on its only flight, on 11 October 1924, crashed into the Delaware River at Philadelphia, Pennsylvania, when the tremendous torque of the Tornado engine flipped it onto its back while attempting to land. The pilot, badly injured, extricated himself from the wreckage.

== Operators ==
United States

- United States Navy

== Specifications ==
Data from The American Fighter from 1917 to the present

General characteristics

- Crew: 1
- Length: 19 ft 9 in (6.92 m)
- Wingspan: 22 ft 6 in (6.85 m)
- Height: 9 ft 4 in (2.84 m)
- Wing area: 174 sq ft (16.16 m^{2})
- Empty weight: 2,468 lb (1,119 kg)
- Gross weight: 3,086 lb (1,400 kg)
- Powerplant: 1 × Wright T-3 Tornado , 780 hp (582 kW)

Performance

- Maximum speed: 240 mph (386 km/h, 210 kn)
