= Wright-Bellanca WB-1 =

General information
- Type: Cabin monoplane
- National origin: United States
- Manufacturer: Wright-Bellanca
- Designer: Giuseppe Mario Bellanca
- Number built: 1

History
- First flight: September 1925

The Wright-Bellanca WB-1 was designed by Giuseppe Mario Bellanca for the Wright Aeronautical corporation for use in record-breaking flights.

== Development ==
The WB-1 was a high-winged monoplane with conventional landing gear and all-wood construction. The landing gear fairings were constructed to extend into wheel pants.

== Operational history ==
The WB-1 was demonstrated at the 1925 Pulitzer Prize Air Races in New York. In the first day's flights, the WB-1 clocked in 121.8 mph in a closed course race. On day two, the WB-1 won, in a payload versus hp and speed efficiency contest, beating a Curtiss Oriole and Sikorsky S-31. In 1926, pilot Fred Becker crashed the overloaded aircraft in a world-record endurance attempt. The aircraft cartwheeled and broke up on a landing attempt.

== Specifications (WB-1) ==
Data from , Aerofiles

General characteristics

- Crew: 1
- Capacity: 5 (1,440 lb (650 kg))
- Length: 24 ft 9 in (7.54 m)
- Wingspan: 45 ft (14 m)
- Powerplant: 1 × Wright J-4 Whirlwind 9-cyl. air-cooled radial piston engine, 200 hp (150 kW)
- Propellers: 2-bladed

Performance

- Maximum speed: 115 kn (132 mph, 212 km/h)
- Cruise speed: 87 kn (100 mph, 160 km/h)
- Stall speed: 39 kn (45 mph, 72 km/h)

== See also ==
Related development

- Columbia (WB-2)
