= Loening M-2 Kitten =

1910s American aircraft

M-2 Kitten
- Loening M-2 Kitten in 1918

General information
- Type: Ultralight
- National origin: United States
- Manufacturer: Loening
- Primary user: United States Navy
- Number built: 3 (plus 1 x Loening M-3)

History
- First flight: 1918

The Loening M-2 Kitten was a light aircraft produced in the United States at the end of the 1920s, for use aboard capital ships and submarines of the United States Navy (USN).

== Design ==
The M-2 was a small monoplane designed for operation from battleships or submarines, with either floats or wheels for operations. Three aircraft were built with USN serials A442-A444; the first used an ABC Gnat, but the others were powered by a Lawrance L-3 radial engine.

Loening developed a dedicated floatplane version of the M-2, the Loening M-3, of which one airframe (Navy serial A5469) was built for the Navy.

== Specifications (M-2 landplane) ==
Data from Aerofiles : Loening

General characteristics

- Crew: 1
- Capacity: Landplane: 224 lb (102 kg)

Floatplane: 240 lb (110 kg)

- Length: 13 ft 11 in (4.24 m)

Floatplane: 17 ft 4 in (5.28 m)

- Wingspan: 22 ft (6.7 m)

Floatplane: 25 ft 2 in (7.67 m)

- Gross weight: 240 lb (109 kg)
- Powerplant: × Lawrance L-3 3-cylinder air-cooled radial piston engine, 55 hp (41 kW) (#2 and #3)

(#1) 32 hp (24 kW) ABC Gnat 2-cylinder air-cooled horizontally-opposed piston engine

Performance

- Maximum speed: 100 mph (160 km/h, 87 kn)
