= Ortego Helicopter =

Experimental American helicopter

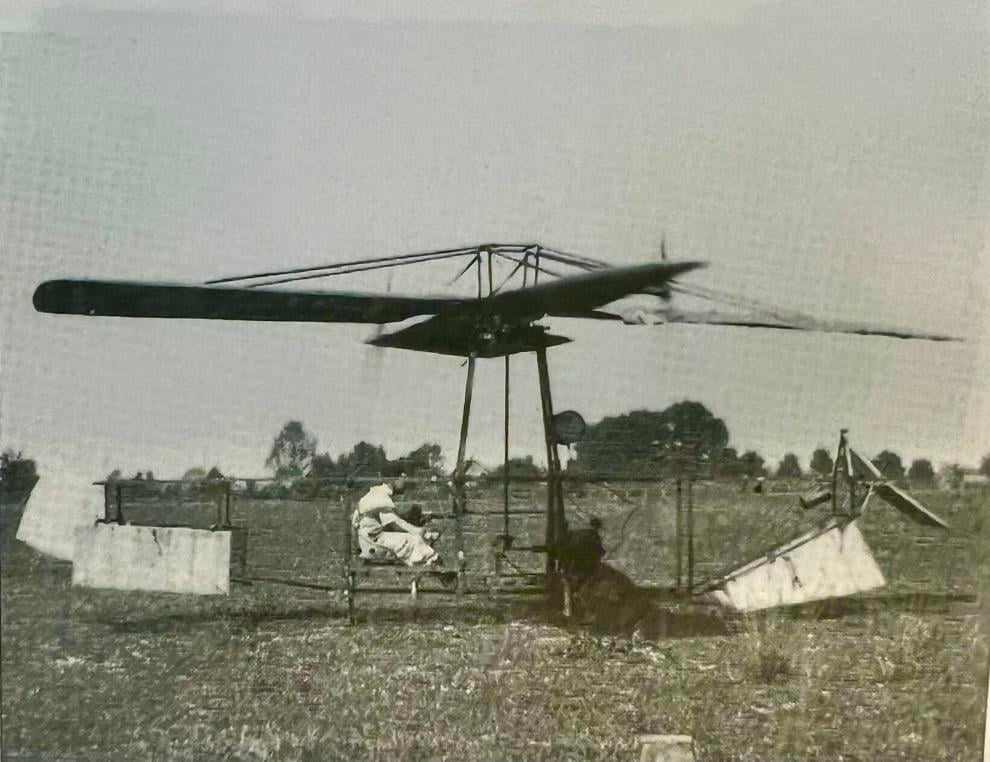
- The Ortego Helicopter being tested in 1922

General information
- Type: Helicopter
- National origin: United States of America
- Manufacturer: Leo Ortego
- Number built: 1

History
- Introduction date: 1922

The Ortego Helicopter was an American rotary wing aircraft, designed and built by Leo Ortego of Alexandria, Louisiana during the 1920s. The helicopter was notable for the rotor blades being turned by propellers mounted onto the blades.

== Design ==
The helicopter consisted of an open-framed fuselage, with a central vertical girder at the top of which a four-bladed rotor is mounted. Forward of the girder was a two-cylinder air-cooled engine connected, via a series of shafts and bevel gears, to two propellers located on two of the four rotor blades. A wooden framework above the rotor provided rigidity to the blades, with the whole structure turning as a single unit. Each blade had a fixed incidence and had neither collective or cyclic pitch control. The craft was constructed from a variety of materials, including aluminum and boxwood.

Directional control was to be achieved by articulating vanes that were mounted outboard of the fuselage. One vane mounted transversely at the front of the fuselage could be manipulated to control forward movement. Two pairs of longitudinal vanes, located near the front and near the rear of the fuselage would control lateral movement. A vertical rudder at the rear of the fuselage would provide directional control.

Ortego submitted a patent application for a "Helicopter" in 1925, with that being granted on January 5, 1926.

== Operational history ==
The Ortego Helicopter was tested in 1922, in an open field sited on the southern corner of Bolton Avenue and Rapides Avenue, Alexandria. On that occasion, it is reputed - without proof - to have flown to an altitude of between 10 and 15 ft (3.0 and 4.5 m) before mechanical failure ended the flight.

That test may have been the same one Ortego wrote about to Scientific American, and which was published in their July 1927 issue. In his letter, Ortego stated that the helicopter's transmission gears were stripped, just as it "started to rise from the ground". He described this event as a "partial success". Ortego indicated that he intended to redesign the rotor blades and to install a more powerful engine.

== Recognition ==
On September 19, 2025, at Alexandria International Airport, a ceremony was held to unveil a mural and a historical marker relating to the Ortego helicopter. The mural depicted the patented helicopter design and also incorporated a portrait of Ortego. The historical marker describing Ortego's work is located in parkland next to the airport.

== Specifications ==
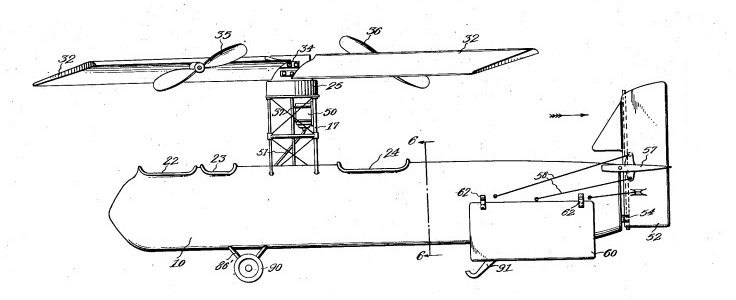
A drawing from US patent 1,568,765 – “Helicopter”

Data from Scientific American

General characteristics

- Capacity: 1
- Length: 23 ft (7.0 m)
- Empty weight: 750 lb (340 kg)
- Powerplant: 1 × Lawrance A-3 , 28 hp (21 kW)
- Main rotor diameter: 25 ft (7.6 m)

Performance

== See also ==
Aircraft of comparable role, configuration, and era

- Brennan Helicopter
- de Bothezat helicopter
- Curtiss-Bleecker SX-5-1 Helicopter
- Saunders Helicogyre
