= Naval Aircraft Factory N2N =

N2N
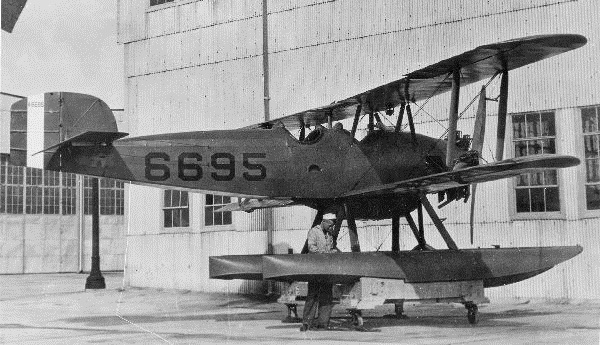

General information
- Type: Training biplane
- National origin: United States
- Manufacturer: Naval Aircraft Factory
- Primary user: United States Navy
- Number built: 3

History
- First flight: 1924

The Naval Aircraft Factory N2N was an American two-seat open-cockpit primary training biplane designed and built by the Naval Aircraft Factory. The N2N could be fitted with twin-floats and was powered by a 200 hp Lawrance J-1 radial engine, only three N2N-1s were built.

== Variants ==
N2N-1
Three-built later re-designated XN2N-1.
XN2N-1
The three N2N-1s re-designated.

== Specifications ==
Data from

General characteristics

- Crew: 2
- Length: 26 ft 11 in (8.20 m)
- Wingspan: 33 ft 8 in (10.26 m)
- Powerplant: 1 × Lawrance J-1 air-cooled radial piston engine, 200 hp (150 kW)

Performance

- Maximum speed: 106 mph (171 km/h, 92 kn)
- Service ceiling: 16,900 ft (5,200 m)

== See also ==
Related lists

- List of flying boats and floatplanes
- List of United States Navy aircraft designations (pre-1962)
