= Lawrance L-3 =

L-3/L-4/Gale
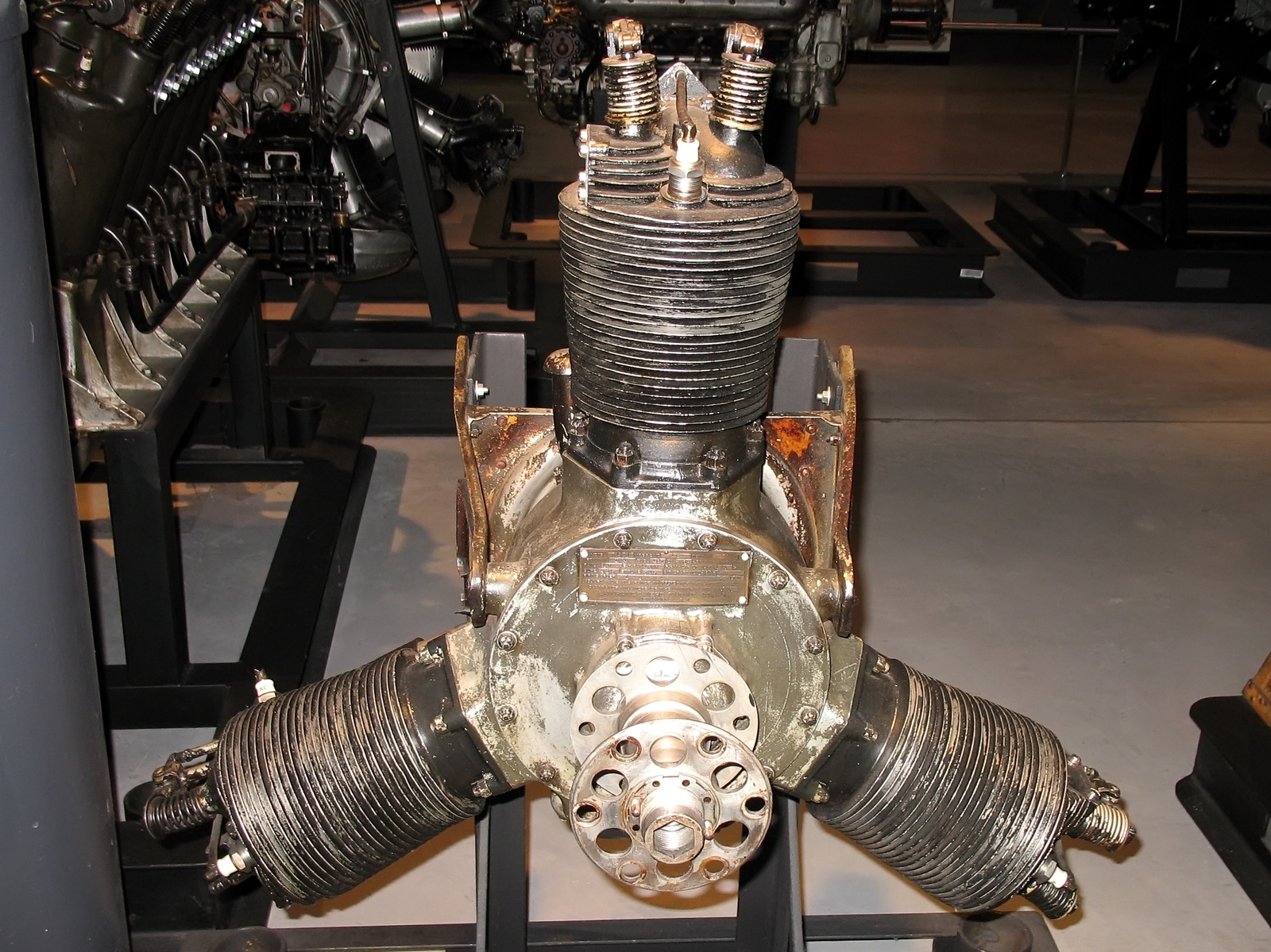
- Lawrance L-3 aircraft engine on display at the Steven F. Udvar-Hazy Center
- Type: Piston aircraft engine
- National origin: United States
- Manufacturer: Lawrance Aero Engine Company
- Designer: Charles Lawrance?
- Major applications: Loening M-2

The Lawrance L-3 and L-4 were early aircraft piston engines with three radial cylinders, designed and built by the Lawrance Aero Engine Company in the early 1920s. The L-3 / L-4 series were marketed by the Wright Aeronautical Corporation as the Wright Gale after the acquisition of the Lawrance company.

== Applications ==
- Loening M-2
- Naval Aircraft Factory SA
- Sikorsky S-33 Messenger

== Specifications ==
=== General characteristics ===
- Type: 3-cylinder, air-cooled radial piston aircraft engine
- Bore: 4.25 in (108.0 mm)
- Stroke: 5.25 in (133.4 mm)
- Displacement: 223.4 cu in (3.7 L)
- Length: 24 in (610 mm)
- Diameter: 39.0 in (991 mm)
- Dry weight: 147 lb (67 kg)

=== Components ===
- Cooling system: air-cooled

=== Performance ===
- Power output: 65 hp (48 kW) at 2,000 rpm

== See also ==
Related lists

- List of aircraft engines
