= Wright T-3 Tornado =

T-3 Tornado
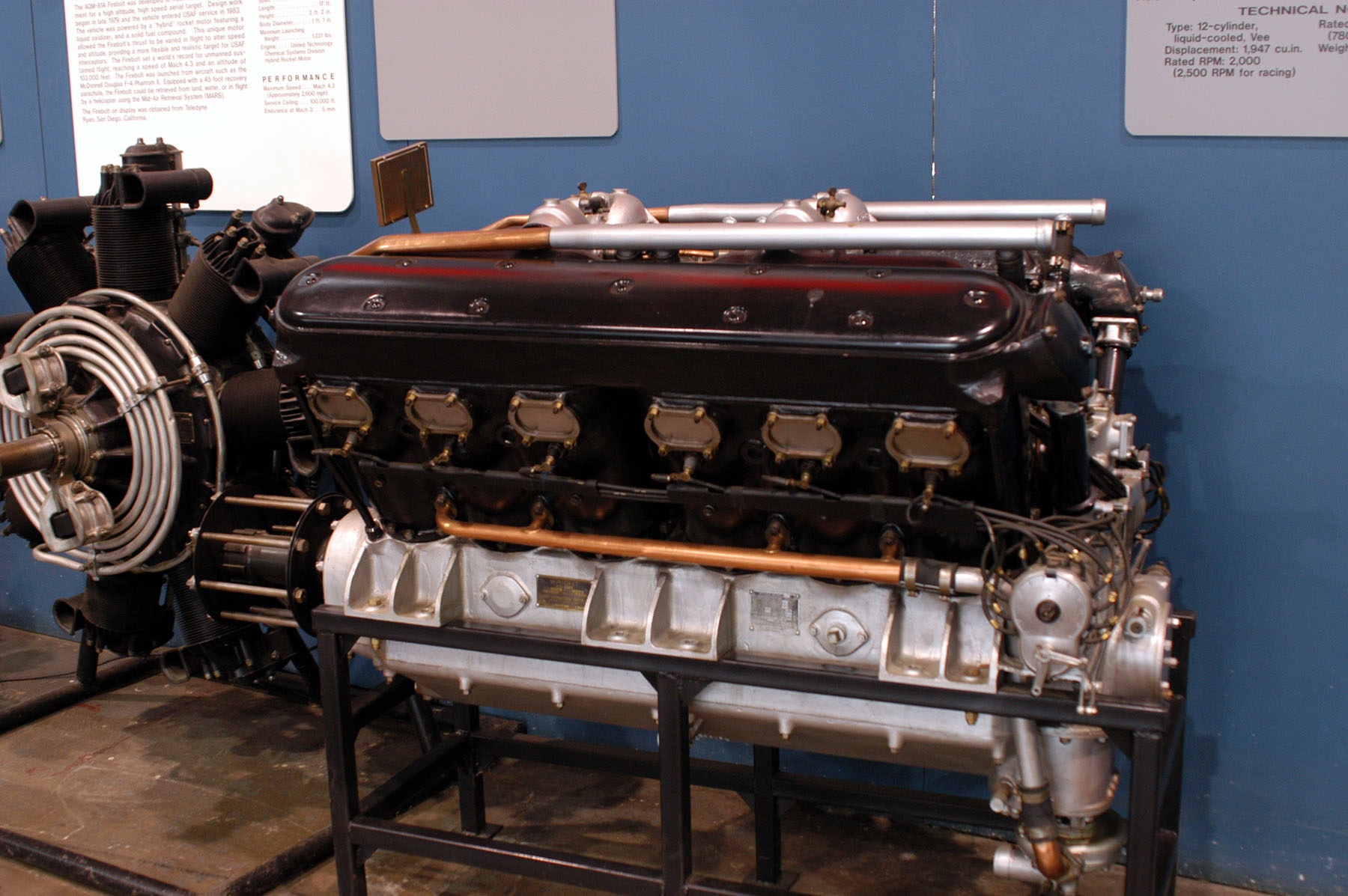
- Wright T-3 on display at the National Museum of the United States Air Force
- Type: V-12 aircraft piston engine
- National origin: United States
- Manufacturer: Wright Aeronautical
- First run: 1923

The Wright T-3 Tornado, also given the USAF designation Wright V-1950 was an American liquid-cooled aircraft piston engine, designed in the early 1920s.

== Development ==
The T-3 was the third in the line of 'T' (Tornado) series engines developed by Wright Aeronautical on the lines of the Wright-Hisso engines produced during the First World War using monobloc cylinder blocks and gear driven overhead camshafts. The T-1 of 1921 had a power output of 500 hp (370 kW), and went into production as the T-2 in 1922 with an increase in power to 525 hp (391 kW). The T-3 and T-3A appeared from 1923 producing 575 hp (429 kW) with the final development, the T-4, producing 675 hp (503 kW) by December of that year. Wright attempted to build a racing version of the T rated at 700 hp (520 kW) to rival the Curtiss D-12, but this was not pursued.

== Applications ==
- Curtiss CS
- Naval Aircraft Factory PN-7 (T-2)
- Martin SC
- Martin T2M
- Martin T3M
- Wright F2W
- Dayton-Wright XO-3

== Specifications (T-3) ==
Data from Gunston.

=== General characteristics ===
- Type: V-12 aircraft piston engine
- Bore: 5.75 in (146 mm)
- Stroke: 6.25 in (159 mm)
- Displacement: 1,947 cu in (31.9 L)
- Dry weight: 1,000 pounds (450 kg)

=== Components ===
- Cooling system: Water-cooled

=== Performance ===
- Power output: 575 hp (429 kW)
- Power-to-weight ratio: 0.575 hp/lb (0.95 kW/kg)

== See also ==
Related lists

- List of aircraft engines
