= Wright Cyclone series =

Radial piston plane engine series

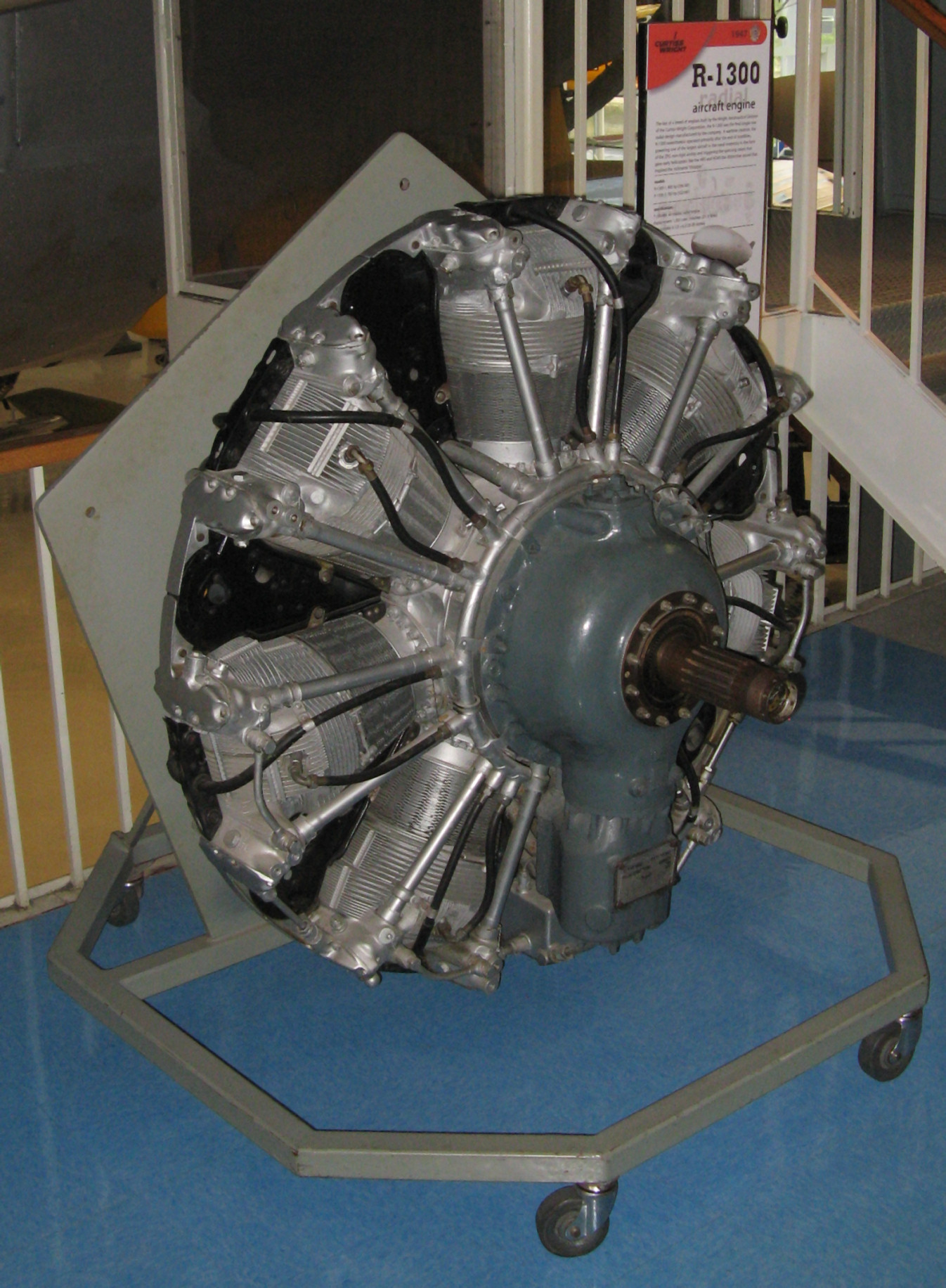
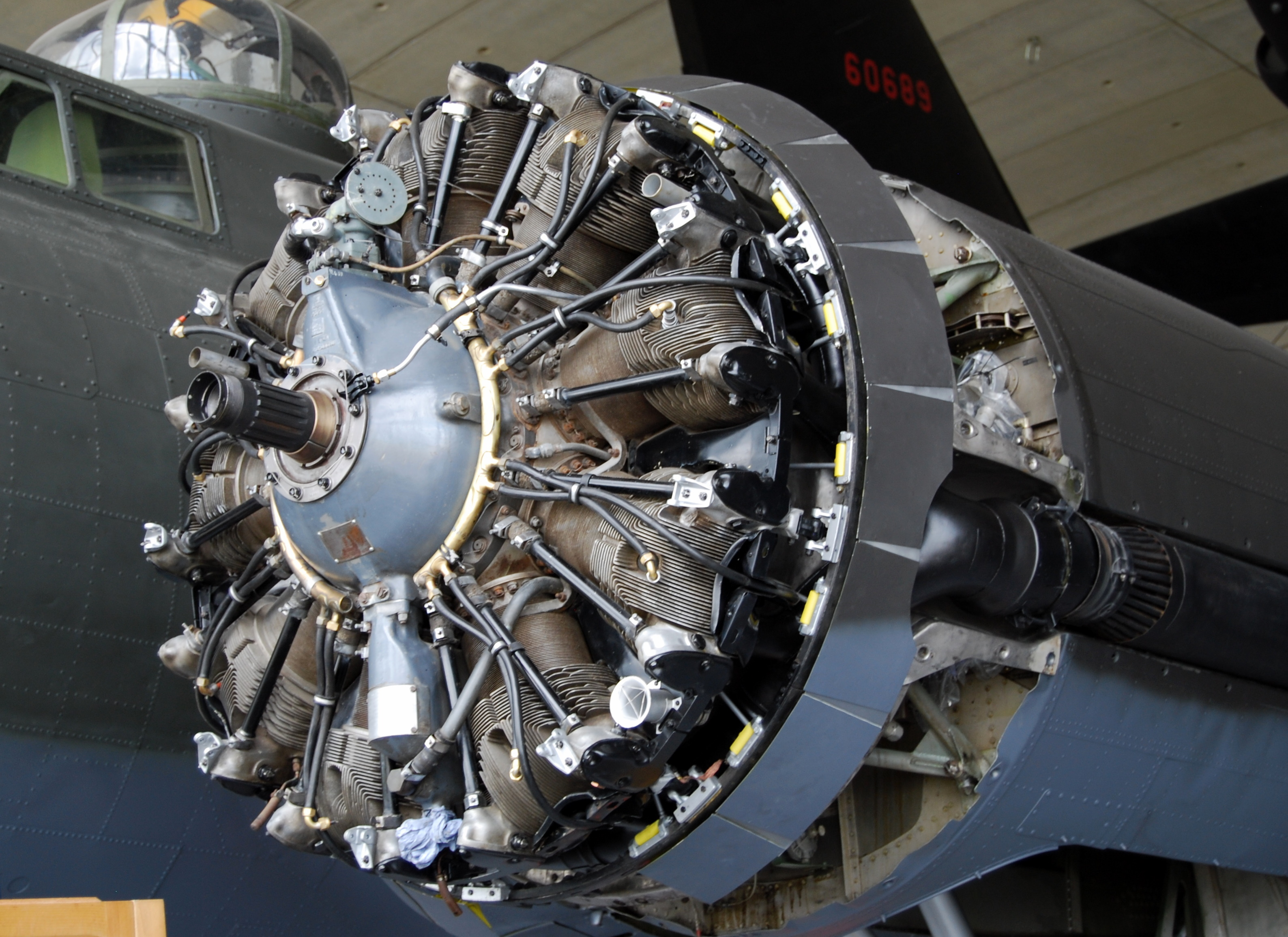
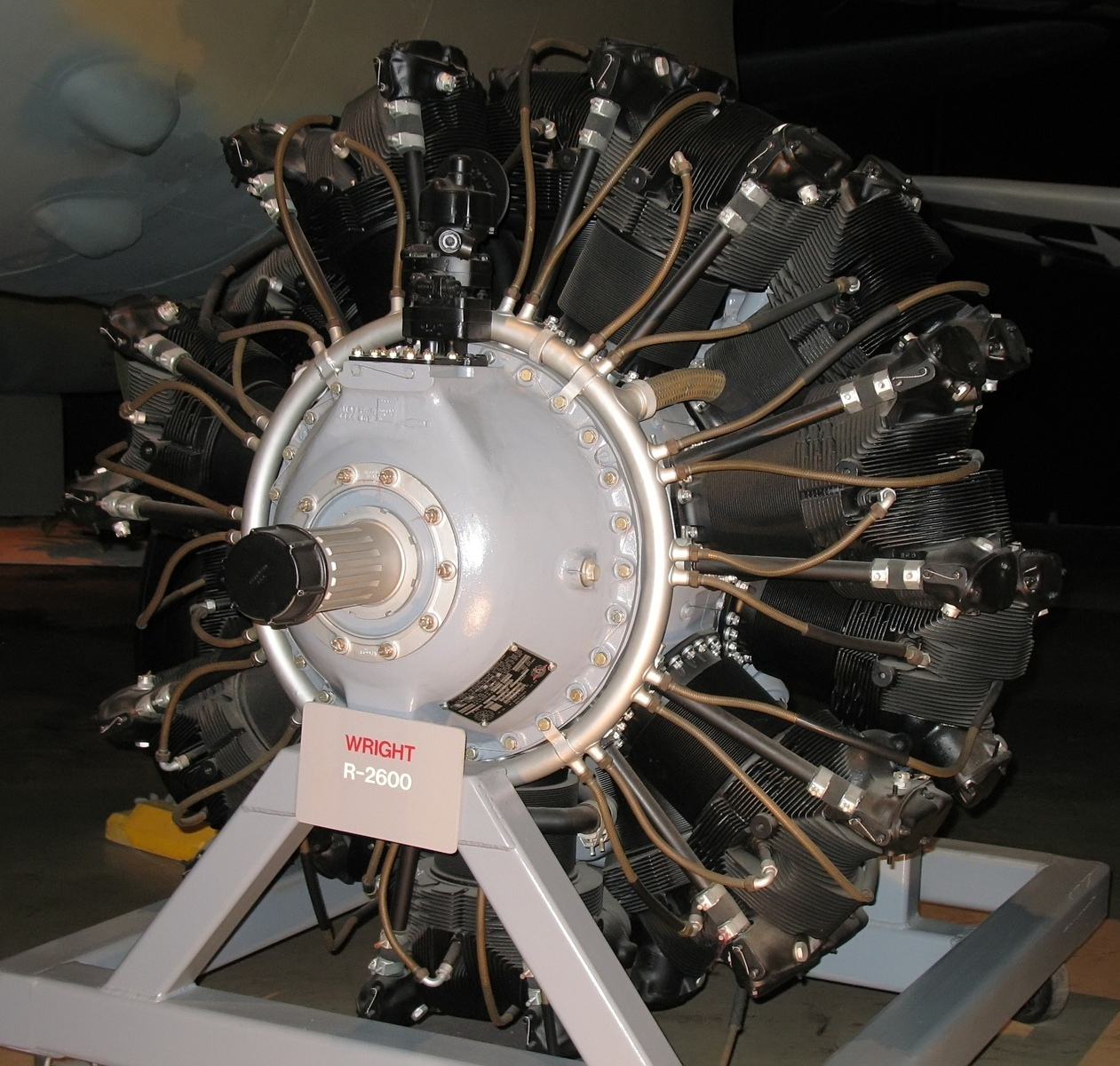
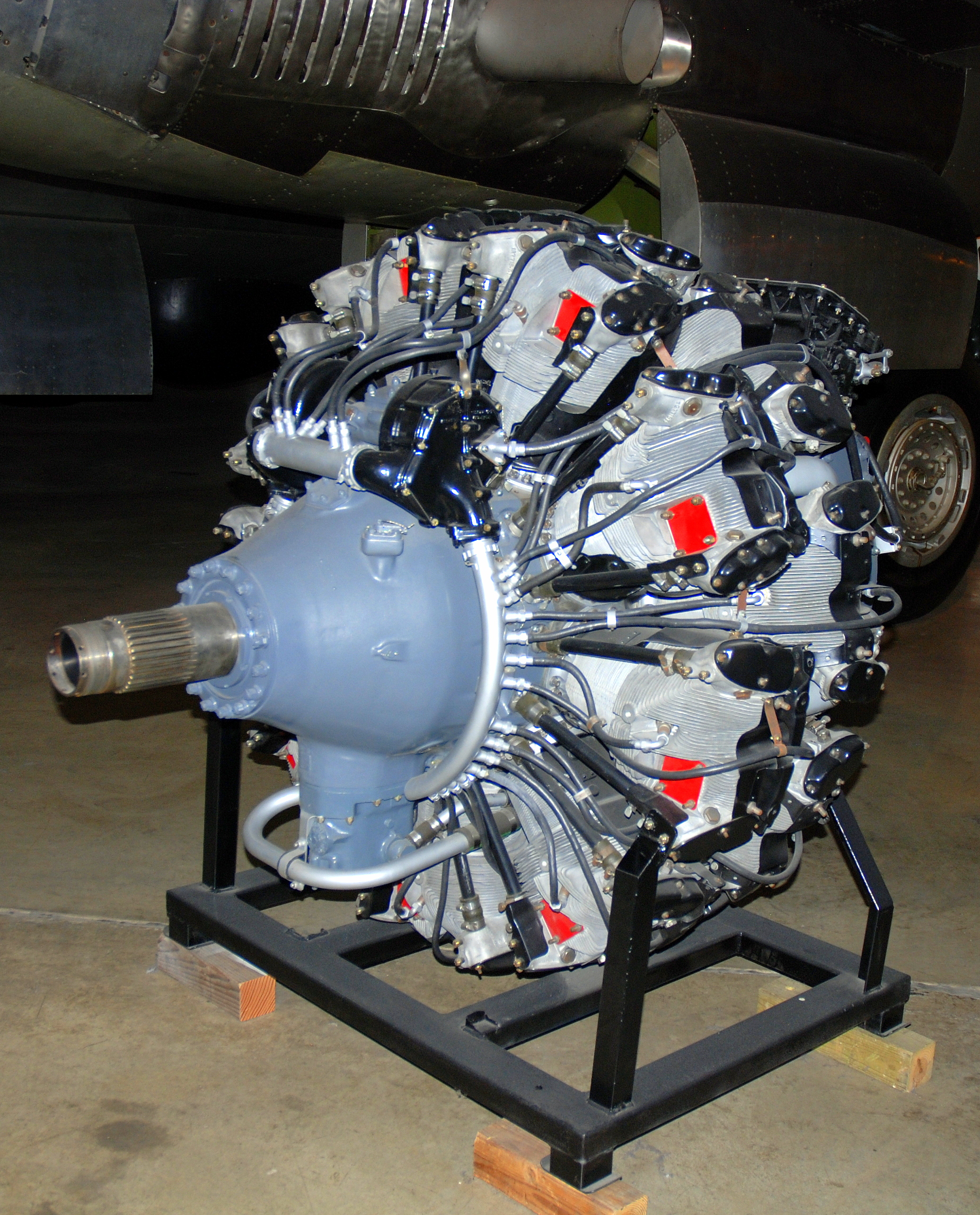
- R-1300, R-1820, R-2600 and R-3350
- Type: Radial engine series
- National origin: United States
- Manufacturer: Wright Aeronautical
- Manufactured: June 1932–December 1963
- Number built: 259,079

Wright Cyclone was the name given to a family of air-cooled radial piston engines designed by the Wright Aeronautical Corporation and used in numerous American aircraft in the 1930s, 1940s and 1950s.

== Background ==
The Wright Aeronautical Corporation was formed in 1919, initially to develop liquid-cooled Hispano-Suiza V8 engines under license. In 1923 Wright purchased the Lawrance Aero Engine Company, and Charles Lawrance came to Wright as the Vice-President. Later that year the US Navy awarded Wright a contract to develop two new air-cooled radial engines. The first, called the P-1, was a 9-cylinder single row design of 1,652 cu in (27.07 L) displacement that was derived from an earlier Lawrence design, it produced 400 hp (300 kW). The second, the P-2, had the same 1,652 cu in (27.07 L) displacement as the P-1, but was an improved design that produced 435 hp (324 kW). Neither engine entered production, with the Navy selecting the superior Pratt & Whitney R-1340 Wasp, so in 1926 work started on the improved 1,750 cu in (28.7 L) design, which became the R-1750 Cyclone.

== Cyclone family ==
R-1300 Cyclone 7 (1942)

- 7-cylinder single row air cooled radial
- Bore x stroke: 6 1/8 in × 6 5/16 in (156 mm × 160 mm)
- Displacement: 1,301 cu in (21.32 L)
- Power output: 800 hp (600 kW)

R-1750 Cyclone (1926)

- 9-cylinder single row air cooled radial
- Bore x stroke: 6 in × 6 7/8 in (152 mm × 175 mm)
- Displacement: 1,750 cu in (28.7 L)
- Power output: 500–525 hp (373–391 kW)

R-1820 Cyclone (1932)

- 9-cylinder single row air cooled radial
- Bore x stroke: 6 1/8 in × 6 7/8 in (156 mm × 175 mm)
- Displacement: 1,823 cu in (29.87 L)
- Power output: 575–1,525 hp (429–1,137 kW)

R-2600 Cyclone 14 (Twin Cyclone) (1935)

- 14-cylinder two row air cooled radial
- Bore x stroke: 6 1/8 in × 6 5/16 in (156 mm × 160 mm)
- Displacement: 2,603 cu in (42.66 L)
- Power output: 1,400–1,900 hp (1,000–1,400 kW)

R-3350 Cyclone 18 (Duplex Cyclone) (1937)

- 18-cylinder two row air cooled radial
- Bore x stroke: 6 1/8 in × 6 5/16 in (156 mm × 160 mm)
- Displacement: 3,347 cu in (54.85 L)
- Power output: 1,800–2,800 hp (1,300–2,100 kW)

R-4090 Cyclone 22

- 22-cylinder two row air cooled radial
- Bore x stroke: 6 1/8 in × 6 5/16 in (156 mm × 160 mm)
- Displacement: 4,090 cu in (67.0 L)

Note: the designations refer to the engine configurations as follows: "R" = Radial, followed by the approximate displacement in cubic inches.

== See also ==
- Pratt & Whitney Wasp series – contemporary competing line of engines
- Wright Whirlwind series – contemporary smaller displacement line of engines
