= Lawrance Aero Engine Company =

American aircraft engine manufacturer

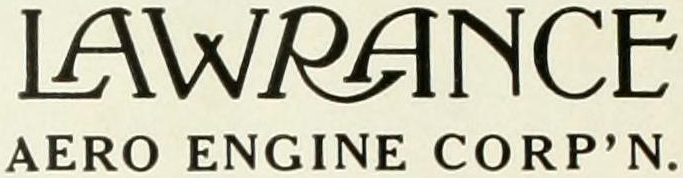
- Founded: 1917
- Founder: Charles Lawrance
- Defunct: 1923
- Fate: Acquired
- Successor: Wright Aeronautical
- Headquarters: New York, New York, United States

Lawrance Aero Engine Company was an American aircraft engine manufacturer. Founded by engine pioneer Charles Lawrance, it designed one of the first successful air-cooled radial engines. It existed for only 5 years, being acquired by Wright Aeronautical, a much larger company better able to mass-produce Lawrance's radial engines.

== History ==
The Lawrance Aero Engine Company was founded in 1917. After the end of World War I, the Lawrance engineers worked with both the Army and the Navy in developing their L-1 into a nine-cylinder radial engine, which became the 200 hp Lawrance J-1. It was the best American air-cooled engine at the time, and passed its 50-hour test in 1922.

The United States Navy was very enthusiastic about air-cooled radials, but was concerned that Lawrance couldn't produce enough engines for its needs. The Navy suggested to Wright that it purchase the Lawrance company and build the J-1 itself. In May 1923, Lawrance was purchased by Wright Aeronautical, with the J-1 being further developed by Wright into the J-5, J-6, and R-795.

== Products ==
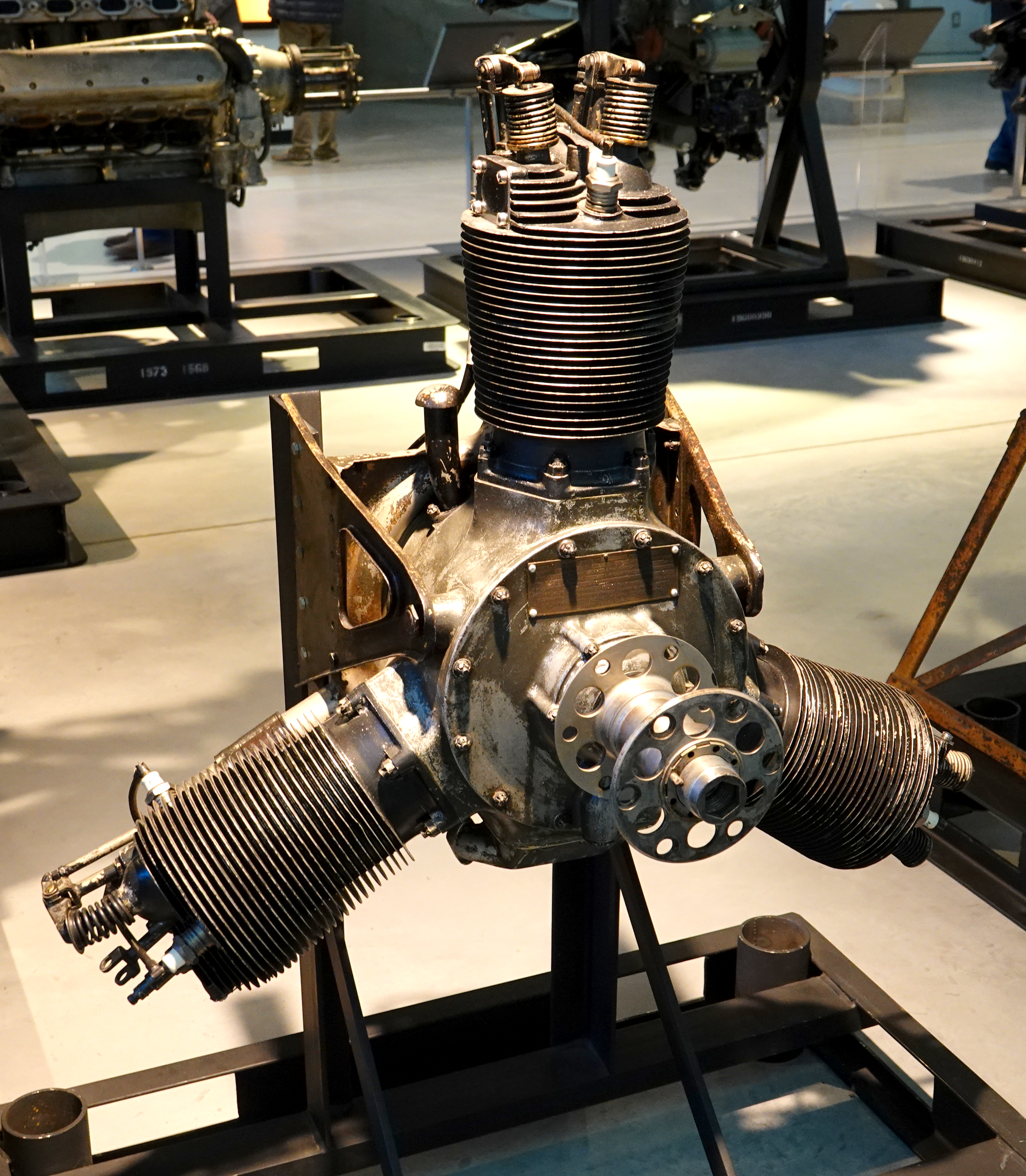
Lawrance L-3

Model name	Configuration	Power
Lawrance A-3	O2	28 hp
Lawrance B	R3	35 to 60 hp
Lawrance C-2		
Lawrance J-1	R9	200 hp
Lawrance J-2		
Lawrance L-1	R3	60 hp
Lawrance L-2	R3	50 hp
Lawrance L-3	R3	65 hp
Lawrance L-4	R3	65 hp
Lawrance L-5		
Lawrance N-2		30 hp
Lawrance R-1	R9	150 hp
