= 1927 in aviation =

This is a list of aviation-related events from 1927:

== Events ==
- The United States Navy's USS Langley (CV-1) becomes the first aircraft carrier to operate a multi-engine aircraft, the twin-engine Douglas T2D-1.
- The British aircraft carrier HMS Argus brings Fleet Air Arm of the Royal Air Force Fairey IIID aircraft to support the Shanghai Defence Force against rebel Chinese forces. The aircraft fly as landplanes from the Shanghai racecourse and as seaplanes from the Huangpu River.
- Germany's lead in commercial aviation is such that during the year German airlines fly greater distances with more passengers than the airlines of France, Italy, and the United Kingdom combined.
- Fred Weick of the U.S. National Advisory Committee for Aeronautics (NACA) develops the NACA cowling, an aerodynamic fairing used to streamline radial engines installed on airplanes, a major advance in aerodynamic drag reduction that enables substantial increases in fuel efficiency. It will win the Collier Trophy in 1929.
- The Société des Avions Bernard (Bernard Aircraft Company) converts a Bernard 18 prototype airliner — replacing its passenger compartment with fuel tanks to give it a range of 6,600 km (4,100 mi) — for Paul Tarascon to make the first nonstop flight from Paris to New York City and win the Orteig Prize. The converted plane, designated the Bernard 18GR, is unable to become airborne with its full fuel load, and after Charles Lindbergh claims the prize in May it is converted back to its airliner configuration.

=== January ===
- The French aircraft manufacturer Dewoitine (Constructions Aéronautiques Émile Dewoitine) is liquidated and transfers its only remaining active aircraft program (the Dewoitine D.27) to Eidgenoessische Konstruktionswerkstaette (EKW) in Switzerland. It will be reestablished as Société Aéronautique Française, or Avions Dewoitine, in March 1928.
- January 1 – Prompted by the increase in air traffic over Europe, a regulation goes into effect in the United Kingdom requiring the installation of wireless telegraphy equipment aboard any aircraft capable of carrying 10 or more people including crew and that such aircraft carry a special operator for the equipment. The use of radio telephony is limited to aircraft carrying five to nine people including crew.
- January 7 – Imperial Airways commences a regular service from Basra to Cairo via Baghdad, the first of its Empire "trunk routes."
- January 15 – Boeing Air Transport is formed, to carry airmail between Chicago and San Francisco. It eventually will become United Airlines.
- January 30 – An aerial sightseeing service is inaugurated in Honolulu, Hawaii, using a Ryan monoplane modified to accommodate five people to give sightseers a 15-to-20-minute ride from Ala Moana Park for $5 each. So many customers line up on the first day that a Curtiss JN-4 Jenny is brought in from Haleʻiwa to accommodate the overflow.

=== February ===
- February 10 – Flying a Ford Trimotor, Harry J. Brooks, chief test pilot of the Stout Metal Airplane Division of the Ford Motor Company, makes the first aircraft flight guided solely by a radio-beacon system.
- February 13 – Regia Aeronautica (Italian Royal Air Force) pilots Francesco de Pinedo and Capitano Carlo Del Prete, accompanied by their mechanic Sergente Vitale Zacchetti, take off from Cagliari, Sardinia, in the Savoia-Marchetti S.55 flying boat Santa Maria to begin their "Four Continents" flight, during which the plan to fly to Africa, cross the South Atlantic to Brazil, make several stops in South America and the Caribbean, visit the United States and Canada, and cross the North Atlantic to recreate the 1919 transatlantic flight of the United States Navy Curtiss NC-4 flying boat before returning to Italy.
- February 16 – After stops at Villa Cisneros in Spanish Sahara and Bolama in Portuguese Guinea, Pinedo, Del Prete, and Zacchetti attempt to take off from Bolama to cross the Atlantic Ocean to Brazil. Sweltering conditions prevent their plane from becoming airborne until they dump a large quantity of gasoline, forcing them to fly to the Cape Verde Islands instead, where cooler conditions prevail.
- February 23 – Pinedo, Del Prete, and Zacchetti cross the Atlantic, flying from the Cape Verde Islands to Fernando de Noronha, where the Brazilian Navy protected cruiser Almirante Barroso meets them and tows their flying boat into port. The next day, they fly to Natal, Brazil, to begin the South American phase of their "Four Continents" flight.

=== March ===
- While exploring drift ice in the Arctic north of the Territory of Alaska, Australian explorer George Hubert Wilkins and American pilot Carl Ben Eielson land on it in Eielson's airplane in the first land-plane descent onto drift ice. Wilkins later hypothesizes from the experience that future Arctic expeditions would take advantage of the wide expanses of open ice to use aircraft in exploration.
- March 9 – United States Army Air Corps Captain Hawthorne C. Gray sets an unofficial U.S. balloon altitude record of 28,510 feet (8,690 m) in a balloon with an open basket launched from Scott Field, Illinois. He passes out from hypoxia in the thin air, regaining consciousness only just in time to drop ballast and slow his fall after the balloon descends on its own.
- March 14 – Pan American Airways (the future Pan American World Airways) is formed to carry airmail on the Key West-Havana route.
- March 16 – After stops at various cities in South America including Rio de Janeiro, Brazil, Buenos Aires, Argentina, Montevideo, Uruguay, and Asunción, Paraguay, the Italian aviators Francesco de Pinedo and Carlo Del Prete and their mechanic Vitale Zacchetti continue their "Four Continents" flight by beginning a long leg over the dense jungle of Brazil's Mato Grosso region. At one point, their Savoia-Marchetti S.55 flying boat Santa Maria is towed by a Brazilian river boat for 200 miles (320 kilometers) along the Paraguay River in search of a suitable takeoff area after a refueling stop, and it takes them until March 20 to complete their crossing of the Matto Grosso and land at Manaós, Brazil. It is history's first flight over the Mato Grosso.
- March 21 – John Rodgers Airport (the future Honolulu International Airport, later renamed Daniel K. Inouye International Airport) is dedicated in Honolulu, Territory of Hawaii.
- March 25 – Belgrade International Airport opens in Belgrade in the Kingdom of Yugoslavia.
- March 29
  - Fritz Loose flies 1,702.8 km (1,058.1 mi) in 14 hours 8 minutes 2 seconds in a Junkers W 33 floatplane with a 500 kg (1,102 lb) load on board at Aken-s-Elbe, Germany, setting new records for nonstop flight distance and duration for Class C2 seaplanes.
  - After stops over the previous four days at Georgetown, British Guiana; Pointe-à-Pitre, Guadeloupe; Port-au-Prince, Haiti; and Havana, Cuba, the Savoia-Marchetti S.55 Santa Maria of de Pinedo, Del Prete, and Zacchetti crosses the Gulf of Mexico and arrives at New Orleans, Louisiana, becoming the first foreign airplane ever to fly into the United States.
  - The United States Department of Commerce's Aeronautics Branch (predecessor of the Federal Aviation Administration) issues its first type certificate, Air Type Certificate No. 1, to the Buhl Airster C-A3.

=== April ===
- April 1 – Waldemar Roeder achieves a new world distance record for an aircraft with a 2,000-kilogram (4,409 lb) payload, flying 630 miles (1,014 kilometers) in 7 hours 52 minutes in a Junkers G 24L.
- April 4 – Fritz Horn achieves a new world distance record for an aircraft with a 1,000-kilogram (2,205 lb) payload, flying 1,260 miles (2,028 kilometers) in 14 hours 23 minutes in a Junkers G 24L.
- April 6
  - The United States Department of Commerce's Aeronautics Branch (predecessor of the Federal Aviation Administration) issues Pilot License No. 1, a private pilot license, to Assistant Secretary of Commerce for Aeronautics William P. MacCracken, Jr. MacCracken becomes the first person to obtain a pilot license from a civilian agency of the United States Government.
  - After departing New Orleans, Louisiana, and flying through Louisiana, Texas, New Mexico, and Arizona as part of their "Four Continents" flight, Francesco de Pinedo, Carlo Del Prete, and Vitale Zacchetti stop on Theodore Roosevelt Lake in Arizona to refuel their Savoia-Marchetti S.55 flying boat Santa Maria. An accidental fire breaks out and destroys the plane; its engines sink 60 feet (18 meters) to the bottom of the lake and are not recovered until April 19. The three Italians will fly to San Diego, California, as passengers on a United States Navy plane and then travel by train to New York City to meet a new S.55 shipped there by the Italian Fascist government so that they can continue their flight. The new plane will arrive in New York by ship on May 1.
- April 10 – In a single flight in a Junkers G 24L, Hermann Roeder achieves two new world speed records for an aircraft with a 2,000-kilogram (4,409 lb) payload, averaging 175.75 km/h (109.21 mph) over a distance of 500 kilometers (311 miles) and 179.24 km/h (111.37 mph) over a distance of 100 kilometers (62.1 miles).
- April 16 – The Portuguese Military Aviation seaplane Argos, crewed by Sarmento de Beires (pilot), Duvalle Portugal (co-pilot), Jorge de Castilho (navigator), and Manuel Gouveia (mechanic), makes the first night aerial crossing of the Atlantic Ocean, taking off from Portuguese Guinea and landing in Brazil, where it arrives after flying 2,595 kilometres (1,612 mi) nonstop in 18 hours 12 minutes.
- April 26 – Attempting a test flight with a full load of gasoline of the Keystone K-47 Pathfinder American Legion (registration NX179), which they plan to use in an American Legion-sponsored attempt to win the Orteig Prize by making the first nonstop transatlantic flight from New York City to Paris, United States Navy Commander Noel Guy Davis and Lieutenant Stanton Hall Wooster crash on takeoff from Langley Field in Hampton Roads, Virginia. Both men are killed.

=== May ===
- May 1 – Imperial Airways introduces its luxury "Silver Wing" service between London and Paris.
- May 2
  - 30,000 people are on hand for the arrival in Belgrade of Yugoslavian aeronautical engineer Tadija Sondermajer and pilot Leonid Bajdak as they complete a 14-stage, 11-day, 14,800-kilometer (9,200-mile) flight from Paris to Bombay to Belgrade. Departing Paris on 20 April, they have followed the route Paris-Belgrade-Aleppo-Basra-Jask-Karachi-Bombay-Karachi-Jask-Basra-Aleppo-Belgrade. They make the flight to spur interest in investment in the Kingdom of Yugoslavia′s first civilian airline, Aeroput. Investment in Aeroput increases greatly, saving the new airline from abolition due a lack of capital.
  - The InterAmerican Commercial Aviation Commission meets in Washington, D.C., to consider problems relating to aviation, draw up conclusions in the form of one or more conventions, and submit the convention or conventions to the member countries of the Pan-American Union for ratification.
- May 4 – United States Army Air Corps Captain Hawthorne C. Gray sets an unofficial record for the highest altitude reached by a human being, attaining 42,470 feet (12,940 meters) in a balloon with an open basket over Belleville, Illinois. Because of the rapid descent of the balloon, he parachutes out at 8,000 feet (2,400 meters), disqualifying him from recognition for an official record by the Fédération Aéronautique Internationale (FAI), which requires that a balloonist land with his craft in order to set an official record.
- May 5 – The Société Générale des Transports Aériens Farman F.61 cargo aircraft F-ADFN disappears over the Atlantic Ocean during a flight from Saint-Louis Airport in Saint-Louis, Senegal, to Petrolina Airport in Petrolina, Brazil. Its two crew members are never found.
- May 7 – Varig is founded. The first airline founded in Brazil, it will begin flight operations in June.
- May 8 – At New York City, Francesco de Pinedo, Carlo Del Prete, and Vitale Zacchetti christen their new Savoia-Marchetti S.55 flying boat Santa Maria II, shipped there by the Italian Fascist government to allow them to continue their "Four Continents" flight and identical to the original plane, Santa Maria, which they had flown until it was destroyed in an accidental fire on April 6. Pinedo plans a revised schedule for their North American tour, eliminating all stops west of the Mississippi River.
- May 8–9 – Charles Nungesser and François Coli attempt to cross the Atlantic Ocean from Paris to the United States in the Levasseur PL.8 biplane L'Oiseau Blanc (The White Bird), but disappear over the Atlantic.
- May 14 – After stops at Boston, Massachusetts; Philadelphia, Pennsylvania; Charleston, South Carolina; Pensacola, Florida; and New Orleans, Louisiana, de Pinedo, Del Prete, and Zacchetti begin a portion of their "Four Continents" flight that takes them north up the Mississippi River into the Midwestern United States.
- May 17 – After completing their tour of the United States with a stop at Memphis, Tennessee, a flight over St. Louis, Missouri, and a stop at Chicago, Illinois, de Pinedo, Del Prete, and Zacchetti make their first stop in Canada, at Montreal, after an 11-hour flight from Chicago.
- May 20 – The Dominion of Newfoundland Post Office issues history's first postage stamp honoring an individual aviator. It honors Francesco de Pinedo.
- May 20–21
  - Flight Lieutenant Roderick Carr sets out for a new flight distance record, attempting to fly from RAF Cranwell in England to India in a modified Hawker Horsley biplane. Forced to ditch in the Persian Gulf, the flight nonetheless achieves a nonstop record 3,420 mi (5,504 km) which will be beaten within hours by Charles Lindbergh.
  - Charles Lindbergh flies the Ryan monoplane Spirit of St. Louis across the Atlantic nonstop from Roosevelt Field in New York City to Paris–Le Bourget Airport. It is the first solo transatlantic flight, over a distance of 3,610 mi (5,810 km); 3,137 nmi), and it sets a new nonstop flight distance record. Lindbergh wins the Orteig Prize for the first nonstop flight from New York to Paris.
- May 22–23 – Pinedo, Del Prete, and Zacchetti depart Trepassey Bay in the Dominion of Newfoundland, planning to cross the Atlantic Ocean to the Azores, refuel, and then fly on to Portugal, retracing the transatlantic flight route of the United States Navy Curtiss NC-4 flying boat in 1919, but they run low on fuel due to unfavorable weather. Pinedo is forced to land the Santa Maria II on the ocean and be taken under tow by a Portuguese fishing boat and an Italian steamer for the final 200 miles (320 km) to the Azores, where the plane arrives at Horta on May 30.
- May 25 – James D. Dole announces a prize of US$25,000 for the first fixed-wing aircraft to fly the 3,870 kilometers (2,405 miles) from Oakland, California, to Honolulu, Hawaii, and US$10,000 for the second aircraft to do so, stipulating that the flights must be completed in the 12 months following August 15, 1927. Dole states he hopes that Charles Lindbergh will compete.
- May 27 – France's first aircraft carrier, Béarn, is commissioned
- May 28 – While flying at 1,200 feet (370 meters) near Reynoldsburg, Ohio, the United States Army Air Service's Keystone XLB-5 bomber prototype suffers a failure of its right engine in which a blade separates from the propeller hub with explosive power, tearing the engine apart and spraying the five-man crew – which includes 2nd Bombardment Group commander Lewis H. Brereton – with shrapnel. The nose gunner is killed, but the other four men aboard parachute to safety. The gasoline-soaked wreckage of the aircraft explodes and burns on the ground.

=== June ===
- June 1 – In a flight between turning points at Dessau and Leipzig, Germany, Wilhelm Zimmermann, flying a Junkers G 24L, achieves a new world speed record for an aircraft with a 2,000 kg (4,409 lb) payload over a distance of 100 km (62.1 mi), averaging 207.26 km/h (128.79 mph).
- June 4–6 – With wealthy New York City businessman Charles A. Levine as his passenger, Clarence Chamberlin makes a nonstop transatlantic flight in his Wright-Bellanca WB-2 monoplane Miss Columbia, from Roosevelt Field, Long Island, New York, to Eisleben, Germany, a record nonstop distance for fixed-wing aircraft of 3,911 miles (6,294 km), in 42 hours and 31 minutes. Chamberlin becomes the second person to pilot an airplane nonstop across the Atlantic Ocean, and Levine, who sponsored Chamberlin, becomes the first person to cross the Atlantic as an aircraft passenger.
- June 5 – The Verein für Raumschiffahrt ("Society for Spaceship Travel") is formed in Germany.
- June 6 – Canadian innovator Wallace Turnbull sells the patent for the variable-pitch propeller to Curtiss-Wright in the United States and Bristol in the United Kingdom. It will be successfully flight tested on June 29.
- June 11 – In Hawaii, the first commercial flight to Kauai takes place when Lewis Air Tours flies a combined six passengers from Oahu to Kauai in two planes, the Ryan cabin monoplane Malolo and a small stunt plane. The flight takes 100 minutes.
- June 15 – U.S. businessman Van Lear Black charters a KLM Fokker F.VIIa for a flight from the Netherlands to Batavia, the first international charter flight.
- June 15–25 – Piloted by First Lieutenants Lester J. Maitland and Albert F. Hegenberger, the United States Army Air Service Fokker C-2 Bird of Paradise makes a 2,815-mile (4,530 km) cross-country flight from Wilbur Wright Field outside Dayton, Ohio, to Crissy Field at San Francisco, California, testing the plane's capabilities prior to an attempt to use it to make the first flight from North America to Hawaii. During the trip — with stops at Scott Field, Illinois; Hatbox Field at Muskogee, Oklahoma; Dallas, Kelly Field, and El Paso in Texas; Tucson, Arizona; and Rockwell Field at San Diego, California — the plane is airborne for 33 hours 9 minutes.
- June 16 – After repairs in the Azores, a flight back to the point in the Atlantic Ocean where they had been taken under tow by a Portuguese fishing boat, and stops in Portugal and Spain, the Regia Aeronautica (Italian Royal Air Force) pilots Francesco de Pinedo and Carlo Del Prete and their mechanic Vitale Zacchetti complete their "Four Continents" flight, landing their Savoia-Marchetti S.55 flying boat Santa Maria II in Ostia's harbor outside Rome. During their 123-day, 29,180-mile (46,989-kilometer) flight, they have visited numerous locations in Africa, South America, the Caribbean, the United States, Canada, and Europe, crossed the Atlantic Ocean twice, made the first flight across Brazil's Matto Grosso region of dense jungle, made the first flight into the United States by a foreign airplane, overcome the loss of their original S.55 Santa Maria in an accidental fire, and retraced the transatlantic flight route of the United States Navy Curtiss NC-4 flying boat in 1919.
- June 17 – Yugoslavia's first civilian airline, Aeroput, is founded as the flag carrier of the Kingdom of Yugoslavia . It will begin flight operations in February 1928.
- June 22 – Varig begins flight operations. Its first flight is a domestic flight in Brazil from Porto Alegre to Rio Grande via Pelotas, using the first aircraft registered in Brazil, a Dornier Do J Wal (registration P-BAAA).
- June 23 – Mikhail Gromov makes the first Soviet parachute jump, when he bails out of a Polikarpov I-1 that has entered an unrecoverable spin.
- June 25 – Construction of the Propeller Research Tunnel is completed at the Langley Memorial Aeronautical Laboratory of the National Advisory Committee for Aeronautics (NACA) at Langley Field in Hampton, Virginia. A wind tunnel, it is the largest research facility of its kind up to that time, and can accommodate the entire fuselage of a full-sized airplane, making it possible to conduct aerodynamic tests of full-scale fuselages, propellers, and other airplane parts.
- June 27
  - The third Ford National Reliability Air Tour begins, with 14 contestants — including Edward Stinson — taking off from Ford Airport in Dearborn, Michigan. The tour cross-markets Ford Motor Company and its Stout Metal Airplane Division and showcases Henry Ford's interest in aviation.
  - Barnstorming pilot Wiley Post, who in the 1930s will gain international fame for his aviation firsts and records, elopes with Mae Lane from Sweetwater, Texas, in a Curtiss Canuck biplane. Engine trouble forces Post to make a forced landing in an open field near Graham, Oklahoma, where the couple immediately marries.
- June 28
  - Wilhelm Zimmermann, flying a Junkers G 24L, achieves a new world speed record for an aircraft with a 1,000-kilogram (2,205-pound) payload, reaching 209.115 km/h (129.938 mph).
  - The Spanish airline Iberia is incorporated. It will begin flight operations in December.
- June 28–29 – U.S. Army Air Corps First Lieutenants Lester J. Maitland and Albert F. Hegenberger make the first transpacific flight from North America to the Hawaiian Islands, flying the Atlantic-Fokker C-2 transport plane Bird of Paradise 2,407 miles (2,092 nmi; 3,874 km) from Oakland, California, to Wheeler Field, Territory of Hawaii, in 25 hours 50 minutes. They will receive the 1927 Mackay Trophy and the Distinguished Flying Cross for the achievement.
- June 29 – July 1 - Richard Evelyn Byrd and his crew fly the Fokker F.VIIa/3m America from New York City to France.
- June 30
  - The United States Department of Commerce's Aeronautics Branch (predecessor of the Federal Aviation Administration) issues Transport License No. 199 to Phoebe Fairgrave Omlie. Although other American women previously had received pilot licenses from the Joint Army and Navy Board on Aeronautic Cognizance, which issued civilian flying licenses between 1918 and 1919, and from organizations such as the Federation Aeronautique Internationale (FAI), Omlie probably is the first woman to obtain a pilot license from a civilian agency of the United States Government. Omlie later receives one of the early aircraft and engine mechanic’s licenses.
  - Since the Aeronautics Branch activated its first lighted airway beacon in December 1926, its network has grown to 4,121 miles (6,632 km) of lighted airways in the United States, including 2,041 miles (3,285 km) of the Transcontinental Airway System previously operated by the United States Post Office Department.
  - The Aeronautics Branch has issued a total of nine type certificates to aircraft.
  - The Aeronautics Branch announces that its first airways strip map — depicting the route from Moline, Illinois, to Kansas City, Missouri — is available for purchase.

=== July ===
- The United States Department of Commerce's Aeronautics Branch (predecessor of the Federal Aviation Administration) begins the first of two series of flight tests — both conducted on the New York City-to-Cleveland, Ohio, airway — of a practical radio navigation beacon system. It will complete the second series of flight tests in February 1928.
- July 1
  - The United States Post Office Department relinquishes control of the Transcontinental Airway System to the United States Department of Commerce. Manned by 45 radio operators, 14 maintenance mechanics, and 84 caretakers, the airway system extends 2,612 miles (4,204 km) from New York City to San Francisco, California, with 2,041 miles (3,285 km) of the route lighted by airway beacons, and includes 92 intermediate landing fields, 101 electric beacons, 417 acetylene beacons, and 17 radio stations.
  - The United States Post Office Department hands over its air mail operations along the western section — between Chicago, Illinois, and San Francisco — of the Transcontinental Airway System to Boeing Air Transport.
  - The U.S. Department of Commerce's Aeronautics Branch (predecessor of the Federal Aviation Administration) issues the first United States Government aircraft mechanic license to Frank Gates Gardner of Norfolk, Virginia.
- July 4
  - The Lockheed Vega makes its first flight. It represents an important step toward the low-drag designs with which U.S. manufacturers will revolutionize airliners in the 1930s.
  - When participants in the third Ford National Reliability Air Tour arrive for an overnight stop in Dayton, Ohio, the tour referee introduces each of them personally to Orville Wright.
  - Accompanied by his Wire Fox Terrier puppy, Hollywood stunt pilot Dick Grace takes off from Barking Sands, Kauai, in a Waterhouse Cruzair in an attempt to win the Dole Prize for the first flight between Hawaii and the continental United States, planning to fly 2,400 miles (3,900 km) to San Francisco or, if he has sufficient fuel, 2,515 miles (4,048 km) to Los Angeles. Sources provide two different accounts of his flight: According to one, he experiences severe flight control problems about 200 miles (320 km) into his flight and turns back, while another claims that he is circling Kauai to test his plane when the problems occur over Koloa. He crash-lands at Koloa, badly damaging the plane; according to once source he is airborne for 51 minutes before the crash. He is thrown 35 feet (10.7 meters) from the cockpit but suffers only two broken hands. He finds his uninjured dog curled up and asleep in a wicker basket.
- July 8
  - New York Airways is founded. The airline will operate as a subsidiary of Pan American Airways (the future Pan American World Airways) until Eastern Air Transport (the future Eastern Air Lines) purchases it in July 1931 and merges it into Eastern.
  - Flying from Naval Air Station San Diego, California, United States Navy Lieutenants Byron J. Connell and Naval Aviation Pilot S. R. Pope set six world records in a 947.705-mile (1,525.183 km) flight in a Naval Aircraft Factory PN-10 flying boat that lasts 11 hours 7 minutes 18 seconds. The flight sets new records for Class C2 seaplanes for duration with a 1,000 kg (2,205 lb) load, duration with a 2,000 kg (4,409 lb) load, distance with a 1,000 kg (2,205 lb) load, distance with a 2,000 kg (4,409 lb) load, greatest useful load carried to a specified duration point, and greatest useful load carried over a specified total distance.
- July 12 – The third Ford National Reliability Air Tour concludes, with contestants returning to Ford Airport in Dearborn, Michigan, completing a course of 4,121 miles (3,581 nmi; 6,632 km) with stops at Buffalo, Geneva, and Schenectady, New York; Boston, Massachusetts; New York City; Philadelphia, Pennsylvania; Baltimore, Maryland; Pittsburgh, Pennsylvania; Cleveland, Ohio; Kalamazoo, Michigan; Dayton, Columbus, and Cincinnati, Ohio; Louisville, Kentucky; Memphis, Tennessee; Pine Bluff, Arkansas; Dallas, Texas; Oklahoma City and Tulsa, Oklahoma; Wichita, Kansas; Omaha, Nebraska; Moline, Illinois; Hammond, Indiana; and Grand Rapids, Michigan. Edward Stinson is the overall winner in a Stinson SM-1 Detroiter, and the Hamilton H-18 Metalplane Maiden Milwaukee places second.
- July 14–15 – Ernie Smith and Emory Bronte complete the first civilian non-stop flight from North America to the Hawaiian Islands in their Travel Air 5000 monoplane City of Oakland. Leaving from Oakland, California, bound for Oahu, they run out of fuel at the end of their flight and crash-land on Molokai after 25 hours 2 minutes in the air. They survive the crash, and United States Army Air Corps airplanes fly to Molokai, pick them up, and fly them to their intended destination at Wheeler Field on Oahu.
- July 15 – Flying as a freelance test pilot, Paul Bäumer, the ninth-ranking German air ace of World War I and founder of the German aircraft manufacturing company Bäumer Aero GmbH, is killed while demonstrating the Rohrbach Ro IX fighter, a new high-performance monoplane, for a Turkish Army commission when the plane enters a spin and crashes in the Øresund off Copenhagen, Denmark.
- July 16
  - The Air League Challenge Cup race takes place for the first time since 1924, returning as an annual event. Flown in England, the race includes participants who are not Royal Air Force pilots for the first time. The 116-mile (187-kilometer) course takes competitors from Castle Bromwich to Woodford and back again. Civilian pilot Norman H. Jones wins in an ANEC II (registration G-EBJO) at an average speed of 73.5 miles per hour (118.3 km/h).
  - United States Marine Corps de Havilland DH.4 aircraft strafe guerrilla forces of Augusto César Sandino in support of Marines forces on the ground in Nicaragua. It is an early example of Marine Corps close air support.
- July 17 – U.S. Marine Corps de Havilland DH.4s attack bandits in Nicaragua threatening the garrison at Ocotal.

=== August ===
- August 4 – A Junkers G 24 belonging to Severa takes off from Norderney, Germany, bound for the Azores on its way to the Western Hemisphere in a quest to make the first east-to-west crossing of the Atlantic Ocean by a heavier-than-air aircraft. The attempt ends when the G 24 crashes in the Azores.
- August 6 – In a single flight, a Junkers K 30 sets three world records for seaplanes over a distance of 1,000 kilometers (620 miles) with a payload of 1,000 kilograms (2,200 pounds), averaging a record speed of 171 km/h (106 mph), remaining airborne for a record 10 hours 42 minutes 45 seconds, and flying a record distance of 1,176 kilometers (731 miles).
- August 12 – The Royal Air Force holds a fly-off between four competing flying boat designs, the Supermarine Southampton, Blackburn Iris, Short Singapore, and Saunders-Roe Valkyrie.
- August 15–16 – Flying from Naval Air Station San Diego, California, United States Navy Lieutenants Byron J. Connell and Herbert C. Rodd fly a Naval Aircraft Factory PN-10 flying boat on a 25-kilometer (15.5-mile) triangular course with an aviation machinist's mate and a dummy cargo of 500 kg (1,102 lb) of sand aboard until they run out of fuel and make a deadstick landing. The flight lasts 20 hours 45 minutes 40 seconds and makes 101 circuits of the course, covering 2,525.313 km (1,569.2 mi). The flight sets three world records for Class C seaplanes — for distance flown, duration, and average speed over a 2,000-kilometer (1,242.7-mile) distance. Their official time for the 2,000 km (1,242.7 mi) record is 15 hours 48 minutes 13 seconds at an average speed of 126.56 km/h (78.64 mph).
- August 16 – The Dole Derby, a California-to-Hawaii race for single-engine airplanes sponsored by James Dole, takes place. Two aircraft arrive safely at Wheeler Field on Oahu, but three other entrants carrying seven persons are missing at sea. The tragedy puts an end to all plans to fly single-engine land aircraft from North America to Hawaii until 1934.
- August 22 – The KLM Fokker F.VIII H-NADU crashes with 11 people on board at Underriver, England, after a structural failure in its tailfin or rudder. One crewmember dies and eight other people are injured.
- August 25 – A gust of wind catches the tail of the U.S. Navy dirigible USS Los Angeles (ZR-3) while she is moored to the high mast at Naval Air Station Lakehurst at Lakehurst, New Jersey, causing her tail to rise until she is at an 85-degree angle. She returns to the horizontal with little damage, the only airship known to have survived such a maneuver.
- August 26
  - Bert Hinkler sets a new non-stop distance record, flying from Croydon, England to Riga, Latvia.
  - Paul Redfern disappears over Venezuela during an attempt to fly 4,600 miles (4,000 nmi; 7,400 km) from Burnswick, Georgia, to Rio de Janeiro, Brazil, in the Stinson SM-1 Detroiter Port of Brunswick (NX-773). His flight nonetheless makes him the first person to fly across the Caribbean Sea and the first to fly from North America to South America.
- August 31
  - St Raphael (G-EBTQ), a Fokker F.VIIa with Leslie Hamilton, Princess Anne of Löwenstein-Wertheim-Freudenberg, Frederick F. Minchin, and Frank Kohler aboard, takes off from RAF Upavon in England bound for Canada in an attempt to make the first nonstop east-to-west flight across the Atlantic Ocean. The aircraft is sighted west of Ireland about 1,200 nautical miles (2,200 km; 1,400 mi) from RAF Upavon that evening but subsequently disappears with the loss of all on board.
  - The United States Post Office Department turns over the operation of its last air mail route — from New York City to Chicago, Illinois — to National Air Transport. Private operators under contract to the Post Office Department now conduct the entire service, a system that promotes the growth of the airline industry in the United States.

=== September ===
- September 1
  - A Boeing 40-B2 begins the first commercial coast-to-coast passenger flight in the United States, departing Concord, California, with two passengers, mail, and other cargo aboard. It lands at New York City 32 hours later.
  - American Railway Express and major airlines began air cargo express operations in the United States. The Cleveland Plain Dealer writes that, although "much less spectacular than the long transoceanic flights, the beginning of real commercial aviation is, from the practical point of view, the most worthy development of all."
- September 4 – In a highly publicized "air vs. water" event, Harry J. Brooks, chief test pilot of the Stout Metal Airplane Division of the Ford Motor Company, flies a prototype of the Ford Flivver in a race against the speedboat Miss America V, driven by Garfield Wood, on the Detroit River at Detroit, Michigan. Miss America V averages 68.851 mph (110.805 km/h) during the three-lap race, but Brooks wins, averaging 72 mph (116 km/h).
- September 8 – The Cessna Aircraft Company is established.
- September 13– The French Air Force's Amiot 122 BP2 prototype bomber departs Paris on a 10,800 km (6,710 mi; 5,830 nmi) tour of the Mediterranean. It will makes stops at Vienna, Beirut, Cairo, Benghazi, Tunis, and Casablanca before returning to Paris.
- September 14 – Adolphe Bernard opens the Société des Avions Bernard (Bernard Aircraft Company) as the successor to the Société Industrielle des Métaux et du Bois (SIMB; Industrial Company for Metals and Wood), which had closed in November 1926 after going bankrupt. The new company resumes the previous one's aircraft design and production projects.
- September 26 – The 1927 Schneider Trophy race is flown at Venice, Italy. Flight Lieutenant S. N. Webster of the United Kingdom wins in a Supermarine S.5 at an average speed of 453.2 km/h (281.6 mph).
- September 28 – Lieutenant Dick Bently of the South African Air Force arrives in South Africa, completing the first solo flight there from England. He had left London on September 1.
- September 29 – Georg Wulf, co-founder of Focke-Wulf, is killed in the crash of the Focke Wulf F 19 Ente ("Duck").
- September 30 – Juan de la Cierva makes the first cross-country rotary-wing aircraft flight in the United Kingdom, flying an Avro 611 autogiro from Hamble-le-Rice to Farnborough Airfield for delivery to the Royal Aircraft Establishment.

=== October ===
- October 10 – The French aviators Dieudonné Costes and Joseph Le Brix depart Paris as they begin a flight around the world in the Breguet 19 G.R. Nungesser-Coli. They will complete the trip on April 14, 1928.
- October 11 – Ruth Elder and George Haldeman take off from Roosevelt Field, Long Island, New York, in the Stinson Detroiter American Girl to attempt the longest nonstop transatlantic flight in history, bound for Paris – Le Bourget Airport in France. Mechanical problems force them to ditch off the Azores on October 13, and they are rescued by the passing tanker Barendrecht. Although they fail to reach Europe, they set a new world distance record for a flight over water of 2,623 miles (4,221 km).
- October 14–15 – Dieudonne Costes and Joseph Le Brix make the first non-stop aerial crossing of the South Atlantic Ocean, flying the Breguet 19 G.R. Nungesser-Coli from Saint-Louis, Senegal to Port Natal, Brazil, as a part of their round-the-world trip.
- October 16 – The Lewis Air Tours biplane Malolo, piloted by Holbrook Goodale — the first Hawaii resident to receive a pilot license and president of the newly formed Hawaiian Air Transportation Company of Honolulu, which he had formed as a serious attempt to establish commercial airline service in Hawaii — crashes and burns at Laie on Oahu, killing all four people on board. Goodale's death results in the dissolution of the company.
- October 19 – Pan American Airways (the future Pan American World Airways) begins operations, making an air mail flight between the United States and Cuba, using a rented plane to meet a mail contract deadline.
- October 27 – On Navy Day, the United States Navy's Ford XJR-1 drops nine U.S. Navy parachutists over Washington, D.C.
- October 28 – Pan American Airways begins regular air mail service between Key West, Florida, and Havana, Cuba, launching its first scheduled international air service. The flights take 70 minutes each way.

=== November ===
- November 2– French aviation pioneer and aircraft designer Jean Hubert, the chief engineer of the Société des Avions Bernard (French: Bernard Aircraft Company), dies in an automobile accident at Formigny, France.
- November 4
  - Flying a Macchi M.52, Mario de Bernardi sets a new world airspeed record of 479.290 km/h (297.817 mph).
  - Flying in a balloon with an open basket in an attempt to set an official world altitude record for human flight – his altitude records of March and May having been unofficial – United States Army Air Corps Captain Hawthorne C. Gray dies of hypoxia after his balloon reaches 40,000 feet (12,000 meters). His body is found in his balloon basket in a tree near Sparta, Tennessee, the next day. His balloon's barograph indicates that the balloon reached between 43,000 and 44,000 feet (13,000 and 13,000 meters) before descending. No further high-altitude balloon fights in open baskets will be attempted until the United States Air Force begins Project Manhigh in 1955.
- November 16 – The United States Navy commissions USS Saratoga (CV-3), its first large aircraft carrier and its first carrier capable of fleet speeds and true combat operations.
- November 17 – Sir Alan Cobham sets out from England in a Short Singapore to make an aerial survey of Africa.
- November 21 – During an air show at Santa Monica, California, parachutist Jean West's parachute becomes entangled on the wing of the plane she jumped from. The pilot manages to land the plane safely, dragging West for several hundred feet, but she nonetheless escapes the incident uninjured.

=== December ===
- December 14
  - The Spanish airline Iberia begins flight operations.
  - The U.S. Navy commissions the aircraft carrier USS Lexington (CV-2).
  - At the controls of the Spirit of St. Louis (registration N-X-211), Charles Lindbergh arrives in Mexico City after a 27-hour-15-minute nonstop flight from Bolling Field in Washington, D.C. The flight begins Lindbergh's goodwill tour of Latin America, which will continue until February 13, 1928.
- December 20 – Letalski center Maribor is established in Maribor in the Kingdom of Serbs, Croats, and Slovenes (later the Kingdom of Yugoslavia). It will become the oldest surviving operating major flying club in the Balkans.
- December 23 – Royal Norwegian Navy Lieutenant Oskar Omdal, Frances Wilson Grayson (a niece of former President Woodrow Wilson), Brice Goldsborough, and Frank Koehler disappear during a flight in the Sikorsky S-36 amphibian Dawn from Curtiss Field on Long Island, New York, to Harbour Grace in the Dominion of Newfoundland, probably going down in the Atlantic Ocean off Nova Scotia in a storm; their remains are never found. They had planned to attempt a transatlantic flight from Newfoundland in the Dawn.
- December 31 – While undergoing testing in France, the prototype of the Latécoère 23 flying boat spins into the ground on approach to a landing, killing all five people on board, including Groupe Latécoère test pilot Achille Enderlin. No more Latécoère 23 aircraft are built.

== First flights ==
- Abrial A-3 Oricou
- Bernard SIMB AB 16
- Bernard 18
- Buhl Airsedan
- Cierva C.9
- Curtis XP-6, prototype of the Curtiss P-6 Hawk
- Focke-Wulf A 17
- Focke-Wulf A 20
- Hamilton H-47, first American all-metal aircraft
- Kawasaki Type 88
- Keystone LB-5
- Latécoère 28
- Nieuport-Delage Ni-D 52
- Piaggio P.6
- Pitcairn PA-4 Fleetwing II
- Pitcairn PA-5 Mailwing
- Polikarpov P-2
- Potez 29
- Ryan Brougham
- Waco 10
- Late 1927– Latécoère 23

=== February ===
- February 27 or 28 - Curtiss XF7C-1, prototype of the Curtiss F7C Seahawk

=== March ===
- March 2 – Boeing XF3B-1, prototype of the Boeing F3B-1
- March 7 – Westland Wapiti
- March 12 – Fokker F.VIII
- March 14 – Parnall Pike N202
- March 26 – Handley Page Hinaidi

=== April ===
- Martin XT4M-1, prototype of the Martin T4M
- April 1 – Monocoupe 90
- April 27 – Stinson Detroiter

=== May ===
- May 4 – Boeing TB
- May 12 – Armstrong Whitworth Starling
- May 17 – Bristol Bulldog

=== June ===
- Eberhart XFG
- June 22 – Short S.6 Sturgeon N199
- June 24 – Polikarpov U-2, later redesignated Polikarpov Po-2 (NATO reporting name "Mule")

=== July ===
- Kawanishi K-11
- Mitsubishi 1MF9
- July 4 – Lockheed Vega
- July 14 – Boeing XP-8

=== August ===
- Macchi M.52

=== September ===
- September 2 – Focke-Wulf F 19
- September 5 – Junkers k37

=== November ===
- Curtiss XF8C-1, prototype of the Curtiss F8C Falcon
- Farman F.180
- Westland Wizard
- November 19 – Fairchild 41 Foursome, prototype of the Fairchild 42 Foursome

=== December ===
- Avro 584 Avocet
- Latécoère 24
- December 12 – Gloster Gambet, prototype of the Nakajima A1N

== Entered service ==
- Buhl Airsedan
- Levasseur PL.5 with French Naval Aviation aboard the aircraft carrier Béarn
- Vought FU-1 with United States Navy Fighter Squadron VF-2B
- Westland Widgeon

=== March ===
- March 9 – Ford XJR-1 with the United States Navy, first Ford Trimotor in service with the United States armed forces

=== June ===
- June 24 – Fokker F.VIII with KLM

=== July ===
- July 1 – Boeing 40, with Boeing Air Transport

=== September ===
- September 28 – Lockheed Vega, with International Airlines

== Retirements ==
- Curtiss F4C-1 by the United States Navy
- Naval Aircraft Factory NO by the United States Navy
