= 1927 KLM Fokker F.VIII crash =

Aircraft crash caused by structural failure

Coordinates: 51°15′9″N 0°13′0″E

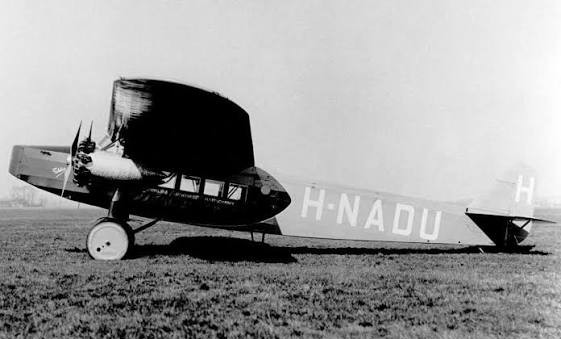
- H-NADU, the Fokker F.VIII involved in the accident.

Accident
- Date: 22 August 1927
- Summary: Structural failure of tailfin
- Site: Underriver, Kent

Aircraft
- Aircraft type: Fokker F.VIII
- Operator: KLM
- Registration: H-NADU
- Flight origin: Croydon Airport
- Destination: Waalhaven Airport, Rotterdam
- Passengers: 9
- Crew: 2
- Fatalities: 1
- Injuries: 8
- Survivors: 10

The 1927 KLM Fokker F.VIII crash happened on 22 August 1927 when Fokker F.VIII H-NADU of KLM crashed at Underriver, Kent, following structural failure of the tailfin or rudder. The aircraft was operating an international scheduled flight from Croydon, Surrey, to Waalhaven Airport, Rotterdam, the Netherlands. One of the two crew was killed and eight people were injured.

== Aircraft ==
The accident aircraft was Fokker F.VIII H-NADU, c/n 4993. The aircraft was manufactured in 1926 and had entered service with KLM on 24 June 1927.

== Accident ==
On 22 August 1927, H-NADU departed Croydon at 8:07 am, bound for Rotterdam. It was carrying two crew, nine passengers, 13 kilograms (29 lb) of mail and 144 kilograms (317 lb) of freight. About 10 minutes after take-off, a tensioning wire at the tail broke, tearing off the rudder and tailfin. This made the aircraft very difficult to control, with a crash inevitable. The aircraft crashed into the crowns of some trees in the grounds of a large house named St Julian's at Underriver. The mechanic was killed when he was crushed by one of the engines. The pilot and seven passengers were injured. The tailfin and rudder were recovered at a distance of over 1 kilometre (1,100 yd) from the wreckage of the aircraft. Damage to the aircraft was assessed at ƒ68,985.07.
