= Fairchild 42 =

Model 41 and Model 42 Foursome
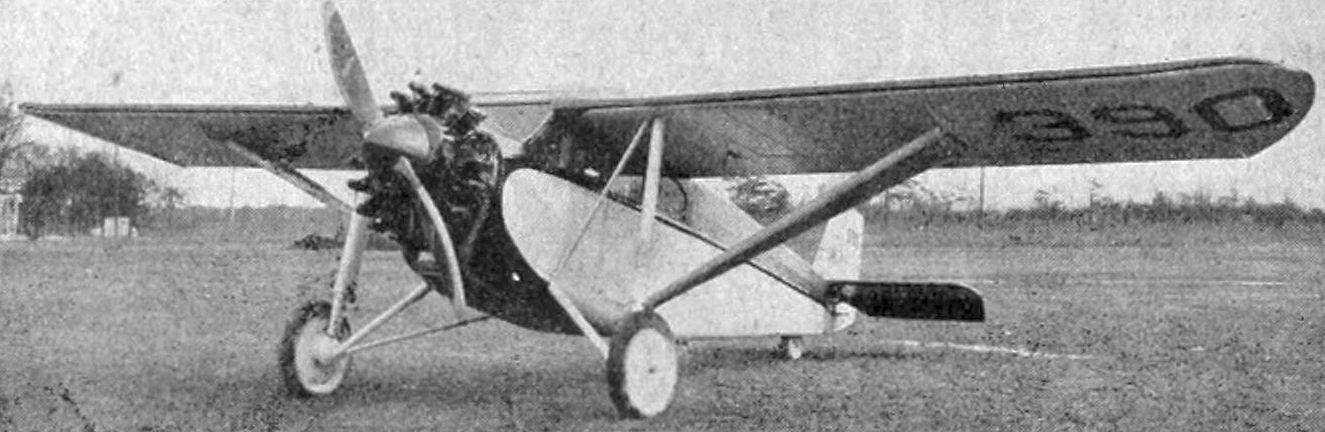
- Model 41

General information
- Type: Utility aircraft
- Manufacturer: Fairchild
- Designer: John Lee
- Number built: 8

History
- First flight: 19 November 1927

The Fairchild Model 41 Foursome is a light aircraft developed in the United States in the late 1920s and produced as the Model 42 Foursome. It was a conventional high-wing, strut-braced monoplane with fixed tailwheel undercarriage. The pilot and three passengers were seated within a fully enclosed cabin, and the aircraft generally resembled a scaled-down version of Fairchild's successful FC-2 design. Two prototypes were built as the Model 41 and Model 41A leading to the Model 42 production version which was built in a small series. This production version differed from the prototypes in having a redesigned, strut-braced empennage in place of the wire-braced unit of the earlier aircraft, and a more powerful version of the Wright Whirlwind powerplant.

== Variants ==
Model 41 Foursome
First prototype four seat cabin monoplane, powered by a 220 hp (160 kW) Wright J-5, one built

Model 41A Foursome
Second prototype four seat cabin monoplane, powered by a 300 hp (220 kW) Wright J-5, one built.

Model 42 Foursome
Production four seat cabin monoplane, powered by 330 hp (250 kW) Wright J-6 engines, six built and two converted from the 41 and 41A.

== Surviving aircraft ==
NC106M has been rebuilt to airworthy standard in Alaska as of July 2008, powered by a Pratt & Whitney R-985 Wasp Junior and converted to seat 7 passengers, with rear round windows added.

== Specifications (Model 42) ==
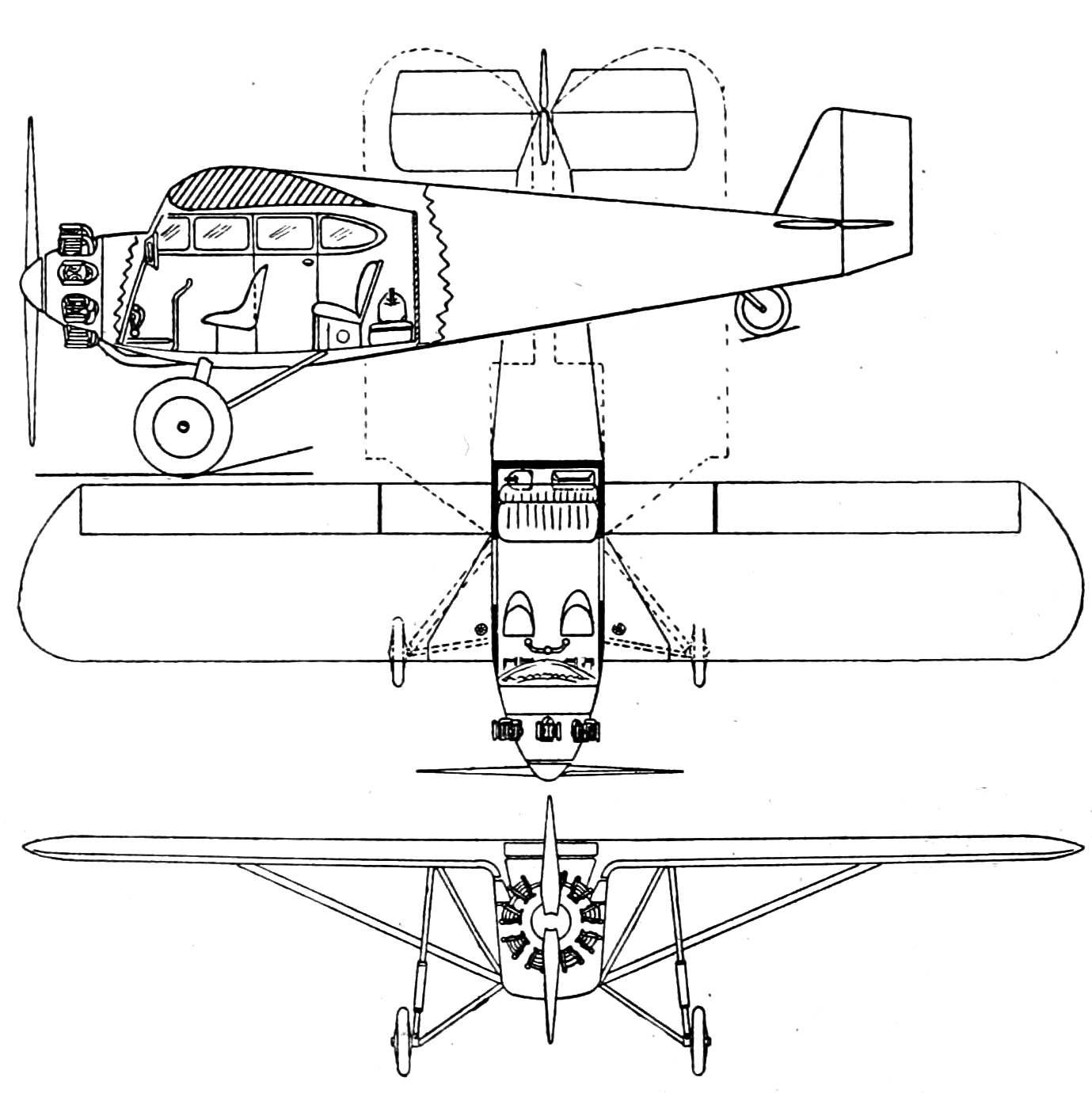
Fairchild 41 3 view drawing from Aero Digest January 1929

Data from U.S. Civil Aircraft Vol. 3 (ATC 201–300)

General characteristics

- Crew: One pilot
- Capacity: 3 passengers
- Length: 30 ft 6 in (9.30 m)
- Wingspan: 45 ft 6 in (13.87 m)
- Height: 9 ft 2 in (2.79 m)
- Wing area: 290 sq ft (27 m^{2})
- Airfoil: Göttingen 387
- Empty weight: 2,676 lb (1,214 kg)
- Gross weight: 4,246 lb (1,926 kg)
- Fuel capacity: 100 US gal (83 imp gal; 380 L)
- Powerplant: 1 × Wright J-6 , 300 hp (220 kW)

Performance

- Maximum speed: 130 mph (210 km/h, 110 kn)
- Cruise speed: 109 mph (175 km/h, 95 kn)
- Range: 700 mi (1,100 km, 610 nmi)
- Service ceiling: 15,300 ft (4,700 m)
- Rate of climb: 720 ft/min (3.7 m/s)
- Time to altitude: 10 minutes to 5,350 ft (1,630 m)
