= Transcontinental Airway System =

Navigational aid deployed in the United States

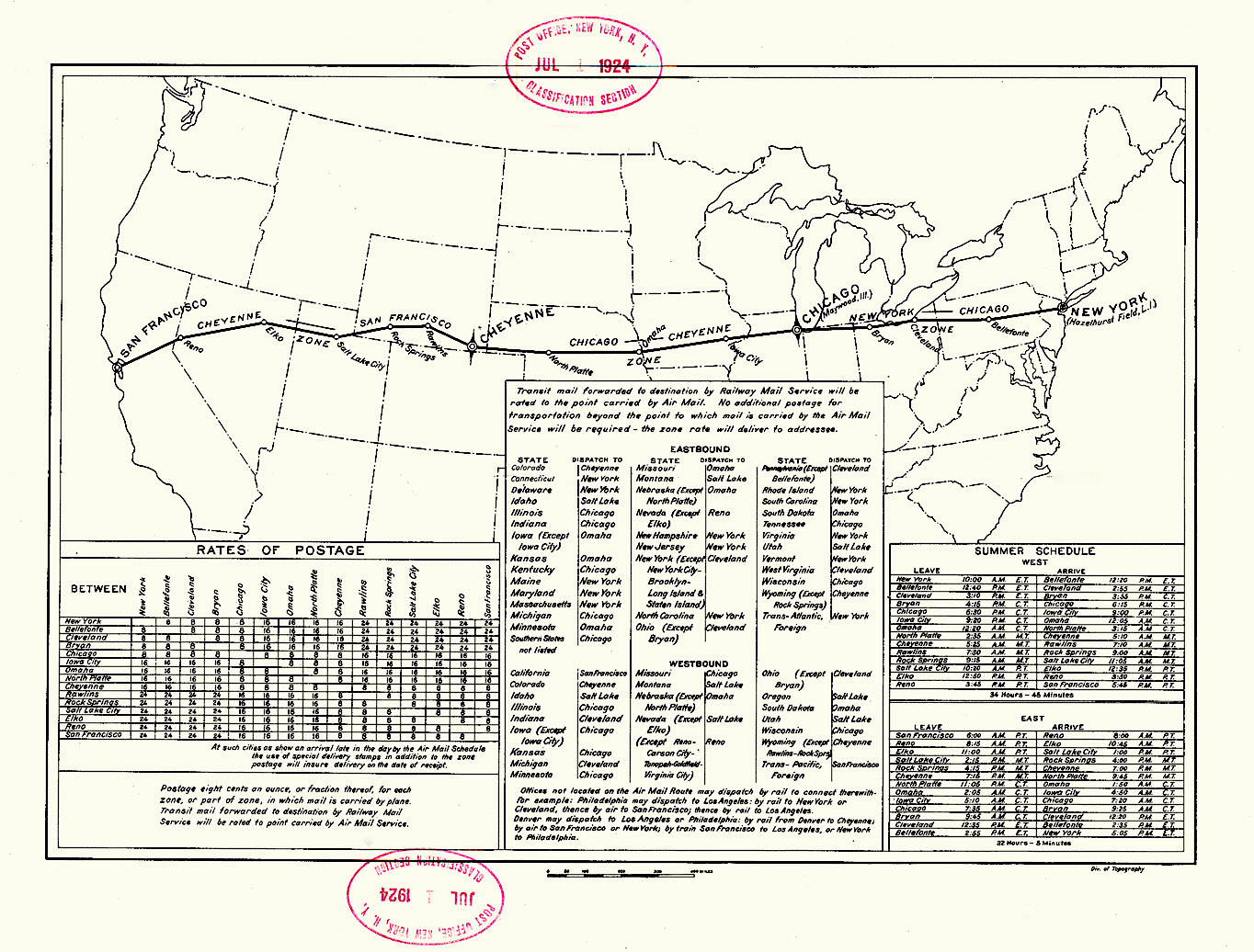
The 1924 U.S. Air mail route

The Transcontinental Airway System was a navigational aid deployed in the United States during the 1920s.

== History ==
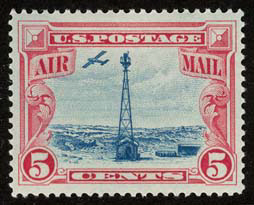
1928 Commemorative Beacon on Sherman Hill

In 1923, the United States Congress funded a sequential lighted airway along the transcontinental airmail route. The lighted airway was proposed by National Advisory Committee for Aeronautics (NACA), and deployed by the United States Department of Commerce. It was managed by the Aeronautical Branch of the Bureau of Standards. The first segment built was between Chicago, Illinois, and Cheyenne, Wyoming. It was situated in the middle of the airmail route to enable aircraft to depart from either coast in the daytime and reach the lighted airway by nightfall. Lighted emergency airfields were also funded along the route every 15 to 20 miles (24 to 32 km).

The construction pace was fast, and pilots wishing to become airmail pilots were first exposed to the harsh wintertime work with the crews building the first segments of the lighting system.

By the end of 1923, the public anticipated anchored lighted airways across the Atlantic Ocean and Pacific Ocean and to China.

The first nighttime airmail flights started on July 1, 1924. By eliminating the transfer of mail to rail cars at night, the coast-to-coast delivery time for airmail was reduced by two business days. Eventually, there were 284 beacons in service. With a June 1925 deadline, the 2,665-mile (4,289 km) lighted airway was completed from New York City to San Francisco, California. In 1927, the lighted airway was completed along the routes between New York City and Salt Lake City, Utah; Los Angeles, California,and Las Vegas, Nevada; Los Angeles and San Francisco, California; New York City and Atlanta,Georgia; and Chicago and Dallas, Texas, 4,121 miles (6,632 km) in total. In 1933, the Transcontinental Airway System totaled 1,500 beacons and 18,000 miles (29,000 km).

== Technical ==
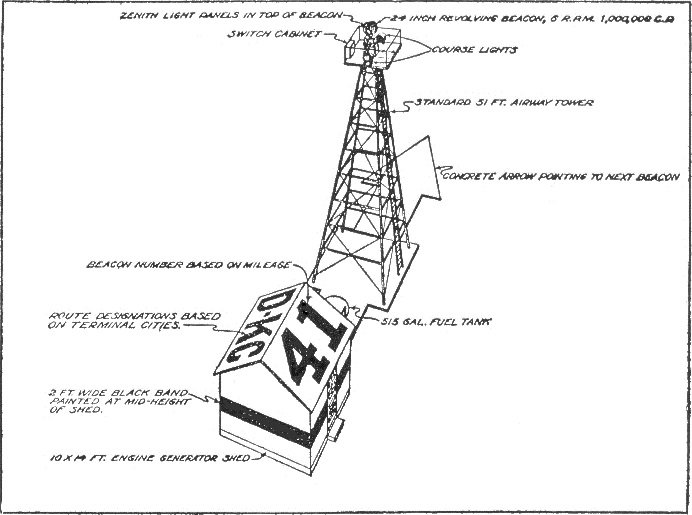
Light, tower, shed, and concrete arrow

The lighted airway beacons were a substantial navigation aid in an era prior to the development of radio navigation. However, their effectiveness was limited by visibility and weather conditions.

The rotating beacons were 24 inches (610 mm) in diameter, mounted on 53-foot (16 m) high towers, and spaced 10 miles (16 km) apart. The spacing was closer in the mountains, and farther apart on the plains. The beacons were five million candlepower, and rotated six times a minute. "Ford beacons" (named after Ford car headlights) were also used, placing four separate lights at different angles. Airports used green beacons and airways used red beacons. The beacons flashed identification numbers in Morse code. The sequence was "WUVHRKDBGM", which prompted the mnemonic "When Undertaking Very Hard Routes Keep Directions By Good Methods". Engineers believed the variations of beacon height along hills and valleys would allow pilots to see beacons both above ground fog and below cloud layers.

Towers were built of numbered angle iron sections with concrete footings. Some facilities used concrete arrows pointing in the direction of towers. In areas where no connection to a power grid was available, a generator was housed in a small building. Some buildings also served as weather stations. Many arrow markings were removed during World War II to avoid aiding enemy bombers in navigation. Nineteen updated beacons remained in service in Montana until 2018, maintained by the Montana Department of Transportation's Aviation Division.

== Gallery ==
Transcontinental Airway System artifacts
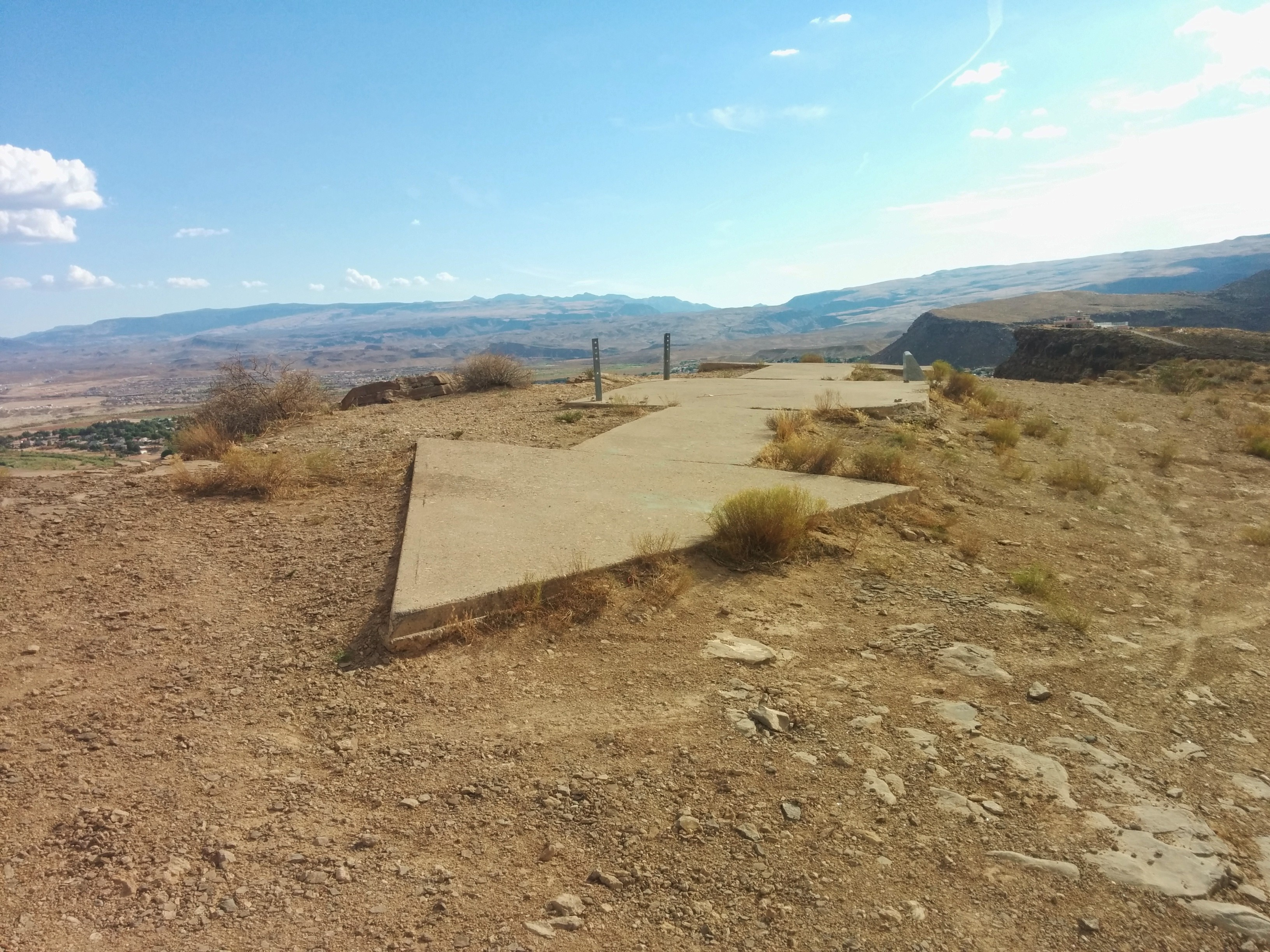
The remnants of Transcontinental Air Mail Route Beacon 37A, which was located atop a bluff in St. George, Utah, in the United States. With concrete arrows indicating the direction of the next beacon, a rotating light tower, and a shed that usually held a generator and fuel tanks, these beacons were once situated every 10 miles (16 km) along air routes across the United States beginning around 1923.

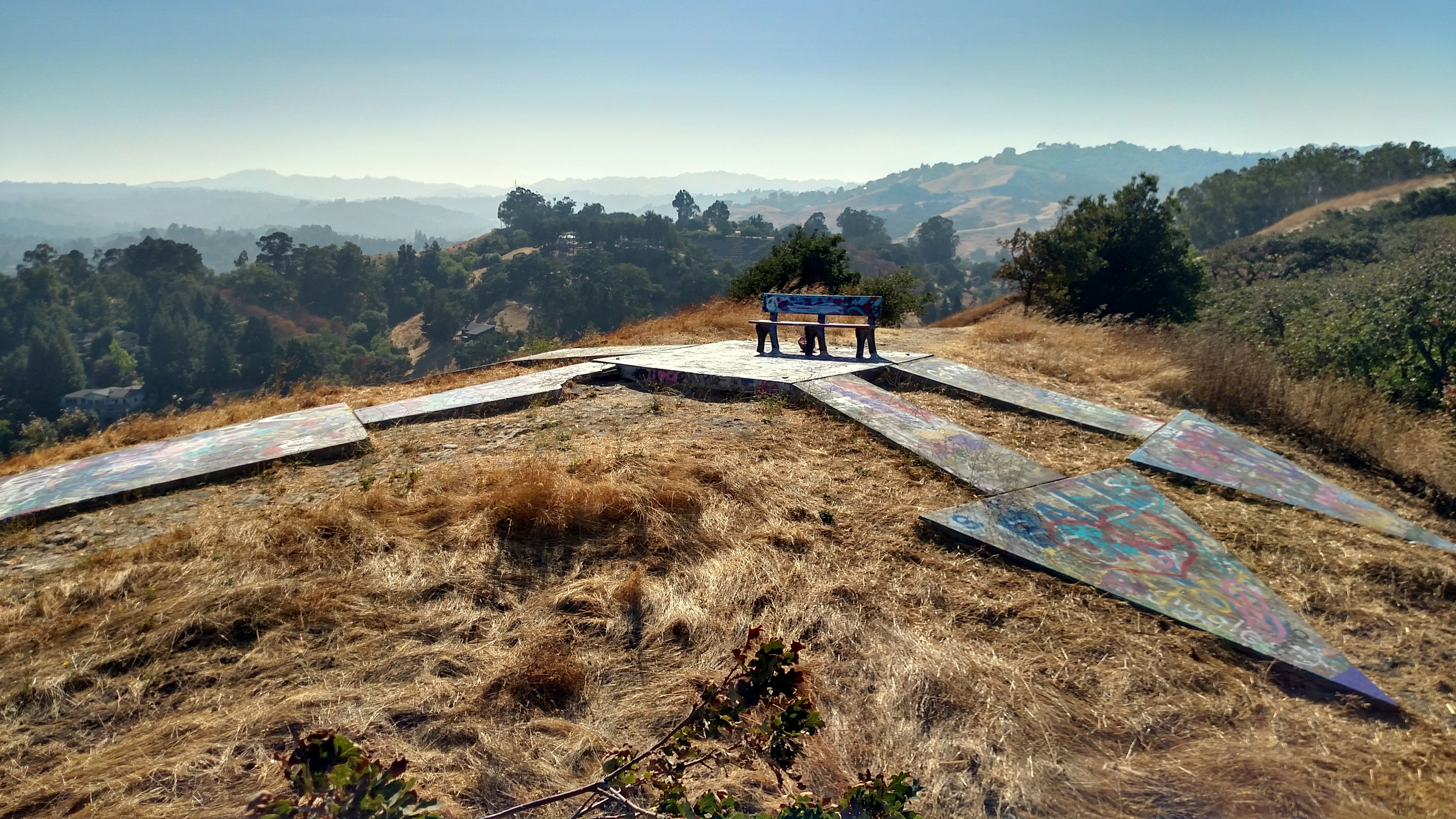
A concrete arrow of the former Transcontinental Airway System in Walnut Creek, California, in August 2018.

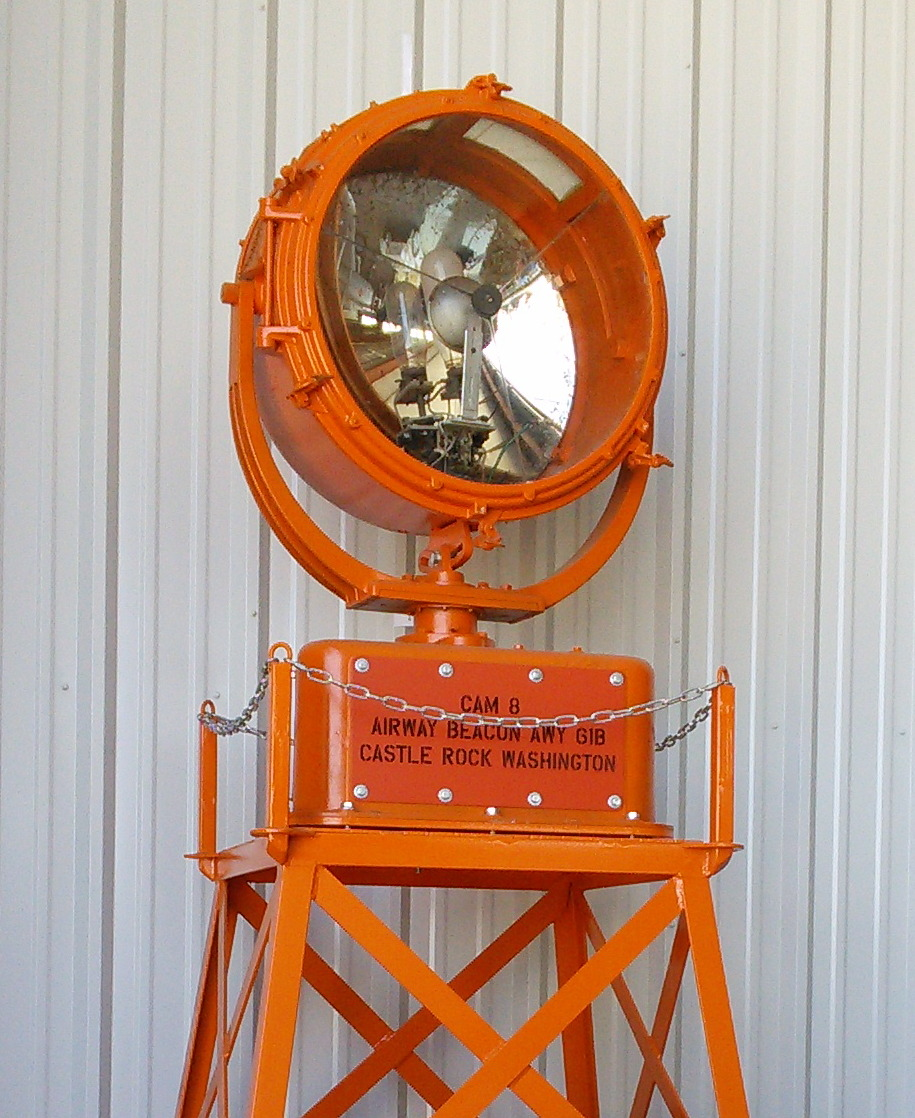
Beacon 61B on a modern display tower, originally installed on route CAM-8 near Castle Rock, Washington.
