= Airway beacon =

Rotating light assembly mounted atop a tower

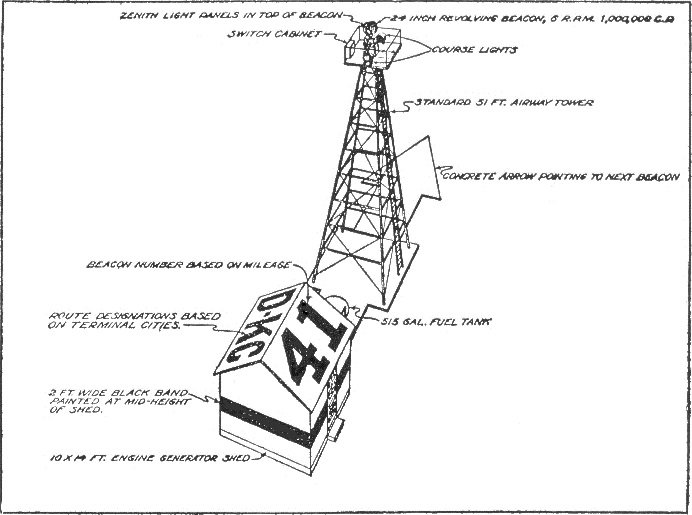
Illustration of an airway beacon, showing a designated number. In this example, for the units digit "1", the Morse code should be ".--" (W).

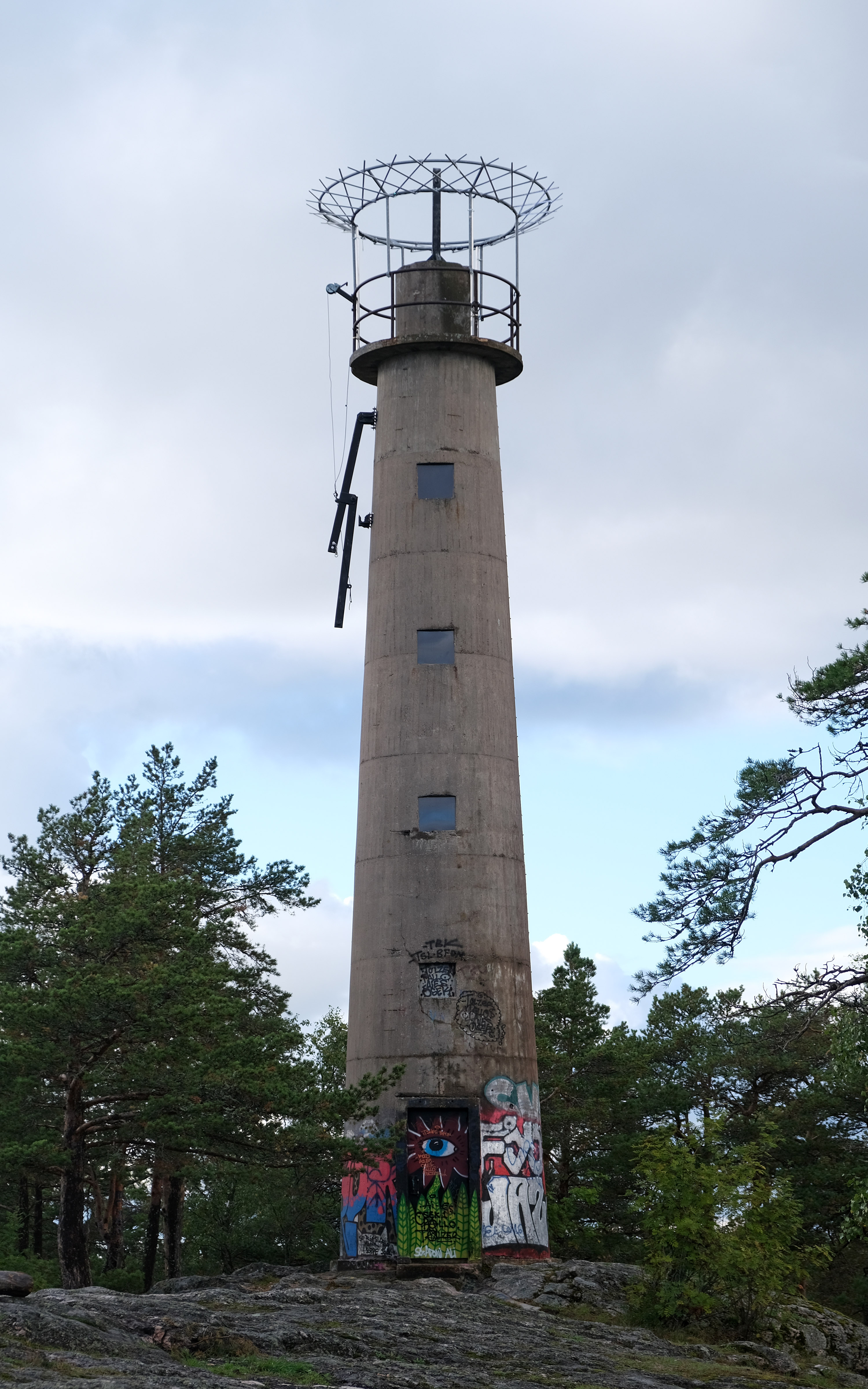
An aerial lighthouse located in Pansio, Turku, Finland

An airway beacon (US) or aerial lighthouse (Europe) was a rotating light assembly mounted atop a tower. These were once used extensively in the United States for visual navigation by airplane pilots along a specified airway corridor. In Europe, they were used to guide aircraft with lighted beacons at night.

== In Europe ==
=== United Kingdom ===
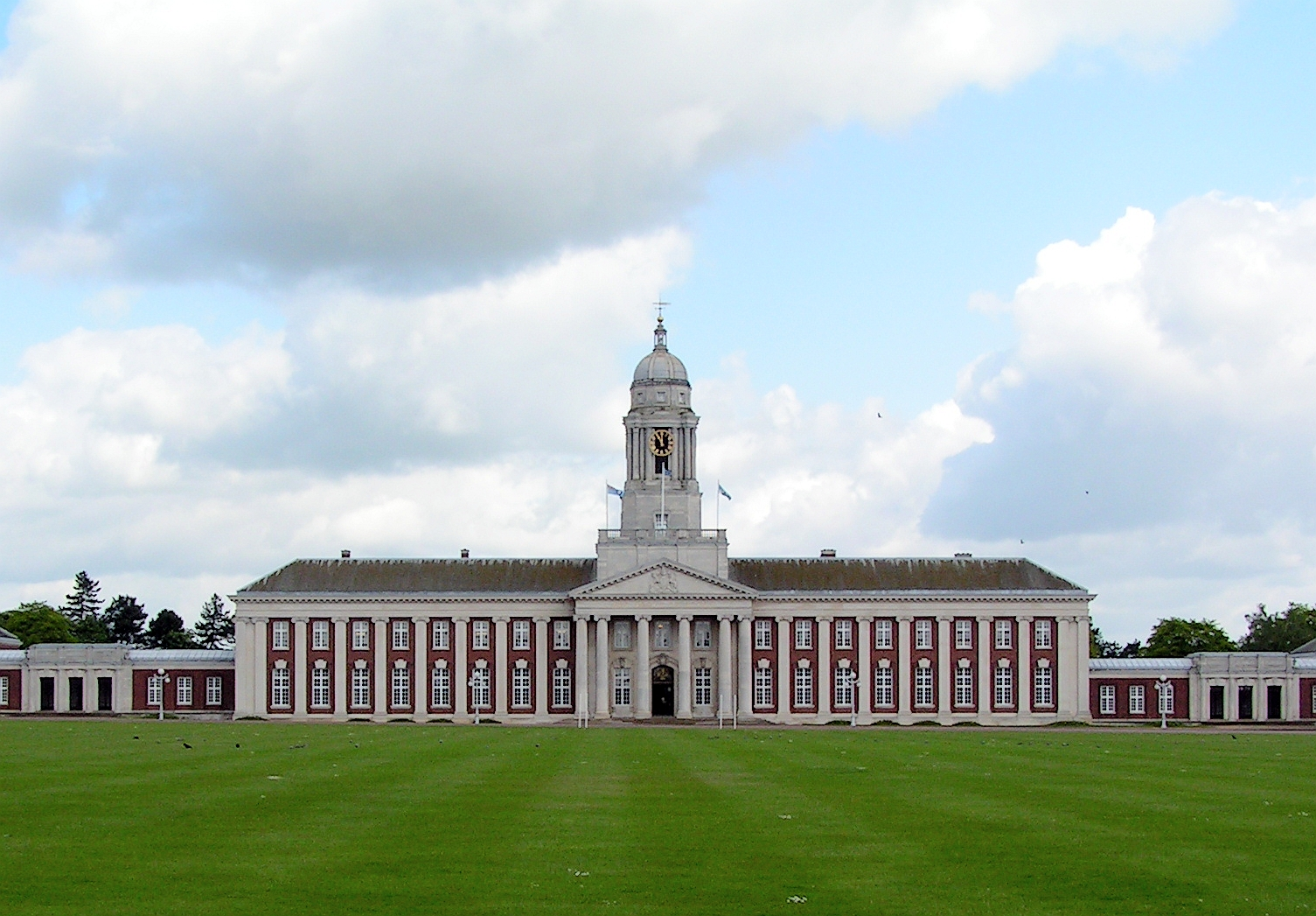
The last operational aerial lighthouse in the UK, at the RAF College main building at RAF Cranwell in Lincolnshire

A network of aerial lighthouses was established in the United Kingdom and Europe during the 1920s and 1930s. Use of the lighthouses has declined with the advent of radio navigation aids such as NDB (non-directional beacon), VOR (VHF omnidirectional ranging) and DME (distance measuring equipment). The last operational aerial lighthouse in the United Kingdom is on top of the cupola over the RAF College main hall at RAF Cranwell.

=== Netherlands ===
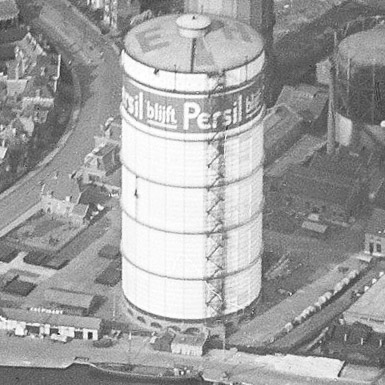
Gas holder Goliath in Eindhoven (designated by the letters EH) in the 1930s

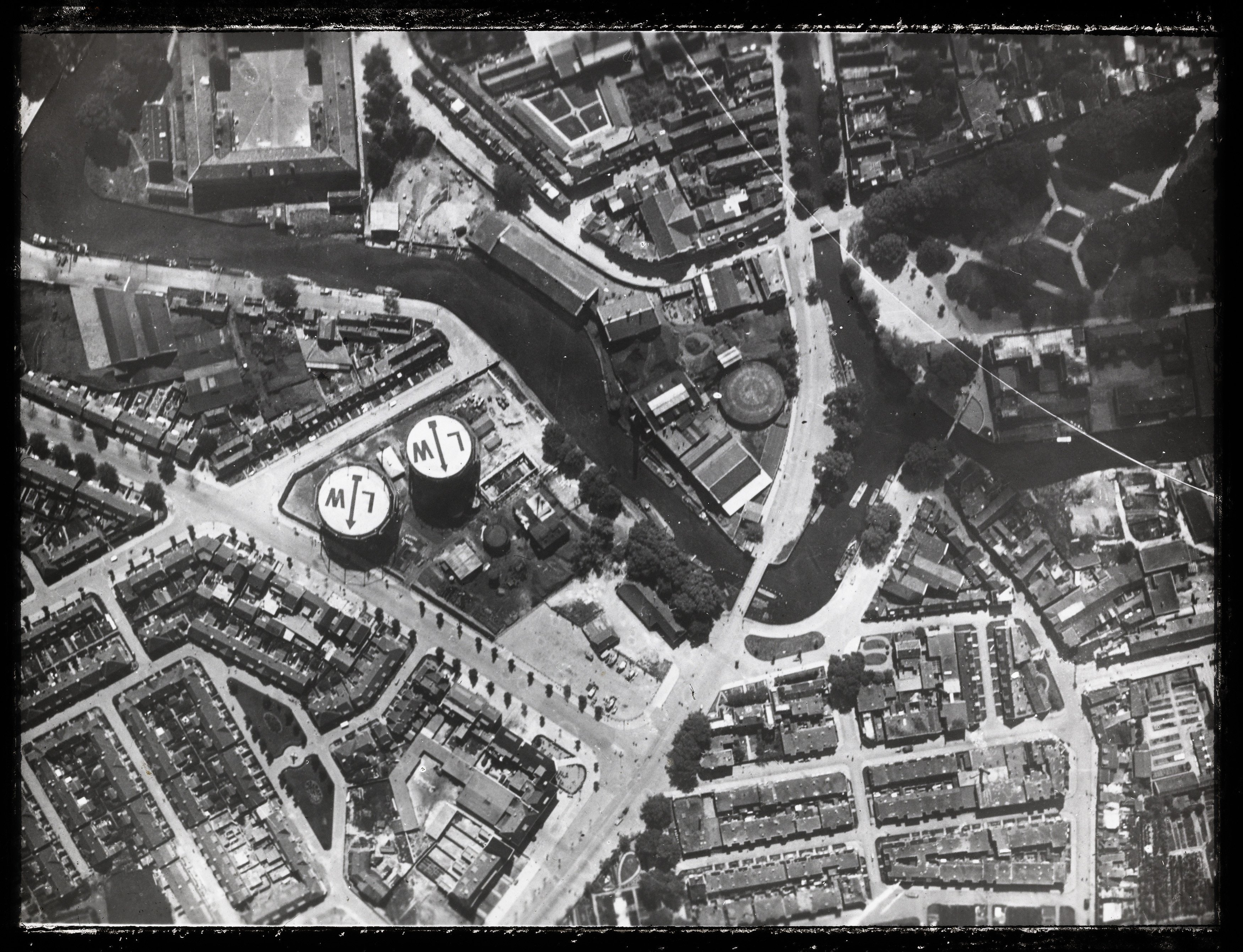
Two gasholders in Leeuwarden.

In the Netherlands, gas holders were painted with an arrow pointing north and two letters identifying their location.

== In the United States ==
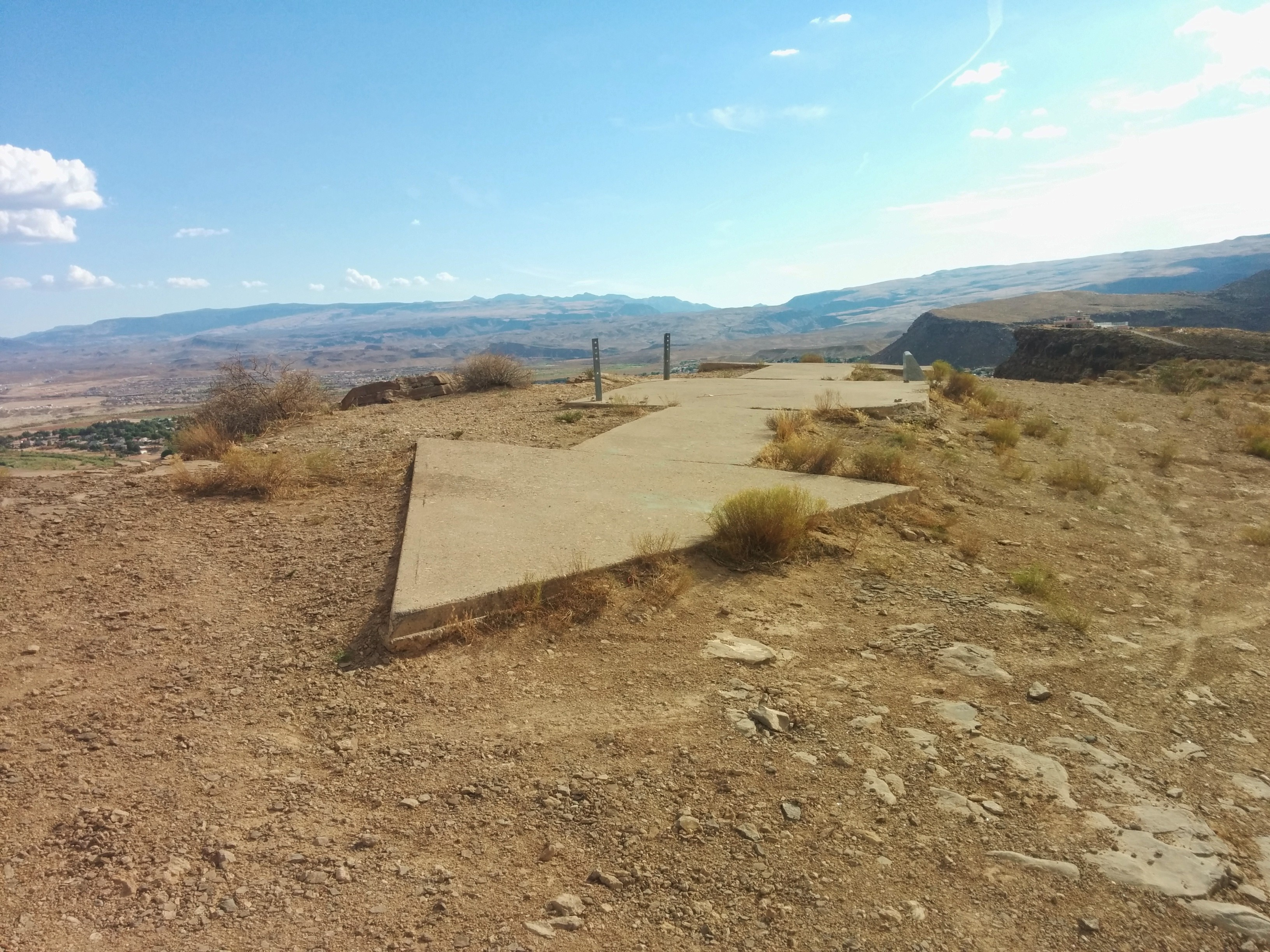
Remnants of Transcontinental Air Mail Route Beacon 37A, atop a bluff in St. George, Utah, with concrete arrow indicating the direction to the next beacon

Approximately 1,500 airway beacons were constructed to guide pilots from city to city, covering 18,000 miles (29,000 km). Today, most of the beacons have been removed, but the State of Montana continues to maintain several as navigation aids in mountainous terrain. One beacon is preserved for historical purposes in Saint Paul, Minnesota at the Indian Mounds Park on a bluff overlooking the Mississippi River. A rotating airway beacon has been in continuous operation at the summit of Rocky Butte in Portland, Oregon since 1929, though it was officially decommissioned during the 1960s. Recently, the beacon at Grants, New Mexico was restored for historic preservation, using original items found at other nearby sites.

A large concrete slab, in the shape of an arrow, was located near the base of each beacon. Many of these arrows remain today, some of which are visible from satellite pictures, even in urban settings.

=== Light characteristics ===
An airway beacon has two distinct light characteristics: A revolving narrow white light beam about 5 degrees wide in azimuth and a set of fixed colored course lights of about 15 degrees width.

==== White rotating beacon ====
The rotating beacon 24 inch (610 mm) parabolic mirror and a 110-volt, 1 kilowatt lamp. spinning at 6 rpm, creating a quick one-tenth second flash every ten seconds. In clear weather they could be seen for 40 miles (64 km). Montana took steps to modernize their beacons, encasing newer light systems in clear domes.

==== Red or green course lights ====
Just below the white beacon, a set of red or green course lights point along each airway route. Red lights denote an airway beacon between landing fields while green denotes a beacon adjacent or upon a landing field. These course lights flash a Morse code letter identifying the beacon to the pilot. Each beacon is identified with a sequential number along the airway, and flash the red or green course lights with the Morse code ID of one of 10 letters: W, U, V, H, R, K, D, B, G or M. The letters represent the digits of 1 through 10 (W = 1, ..., M = 10). The course lights turn on for 0.5 second for a dot, 1.5 second for a dash with a 0.5 second between each dot or dash. A pause of 1.5 seconds separates each letter.

To help remember the letters and their sequence number, pilots memorized the following: "When Undertaking Very Hard Routes, Keep Direction By Good Methods." The beacons are depicted on navigation charts along with their number and Morse code pattern. For example, beacon number 15 would have a code digit of 5 (the units digit), hence the letter R, and Morse code: "dit dah dit" (·−·).

=== History ===
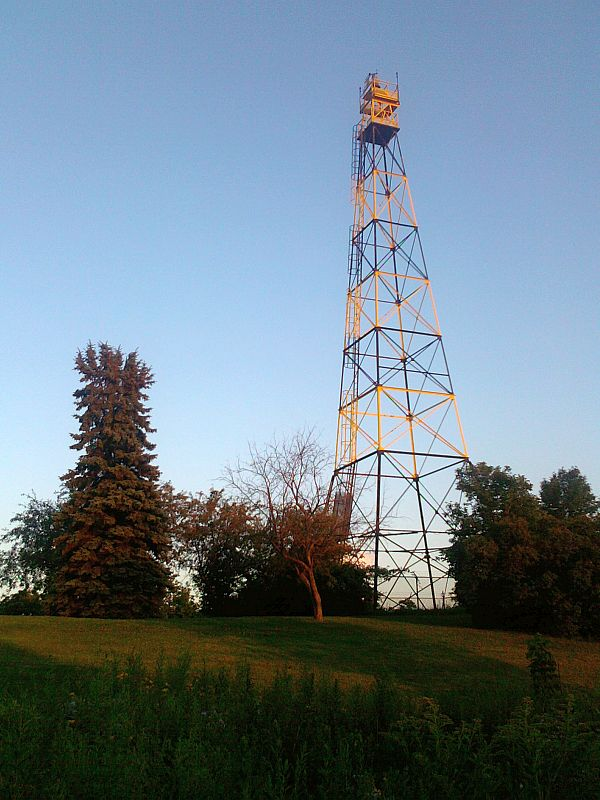
An airway beacon in Saint Paul, Minnesota, built in 1929 and restored in the 1990s. It sits on top of a 110-foot (34 m) steel tower in Indian Mounds Park.

Airway beacons in the US were constructed by the Post Office and the Department of Commerce between 1923 and 1933. The Low Frequency Radio Range system began to replace this visual system in 1929. The last visual airway beacon was supposedly shut down in 1973, but a few airway beacons are still operating in Portland, Oregon and Western Montana. Those in Montana are charted on the Great Falls sectional chart. Montana was the last state to officially maintain airway beacons, through the state's Aviation Division. In 2017, the decision was made by Aeronautics Division to discontinue their maintenance of the system, due to the system's obsolete nature and budgetary concerns. The system was to be shut down entirely by 31 December 2021. In spring of 2018, fourteen of the seventeen beacons were shut down by MDT. The Montana Department of Transportation's Communications Bureau took over care of beacons at St. Regis and Lookout Pass. Six beacons are now in the care of the owners of the land they were erected on, six are in the care of a non-profit, Idaho Aviation Heritage, and four are in the care of local governments. Due to their historical significance in the state, the beacons at Homestake Pass, Canyon Resort, MacDonald Pass, Silver Bow, Spokane, Lookout Pass, St. Regis, and Whitetail are in the process of being listed on the National Register of Historic Places. The Strawberry Mountain beacon was demolished in the summer of 2021. MDT's Aeronautics Division removed the beacon and donated it to the Montana Historical Society.

== See also ==
- Index of aviation articles
- Transcontinental Airway System (United States)
