= Underriver =

Village in Kent, England

Coordinates: 51.2499°N 0.2283°E

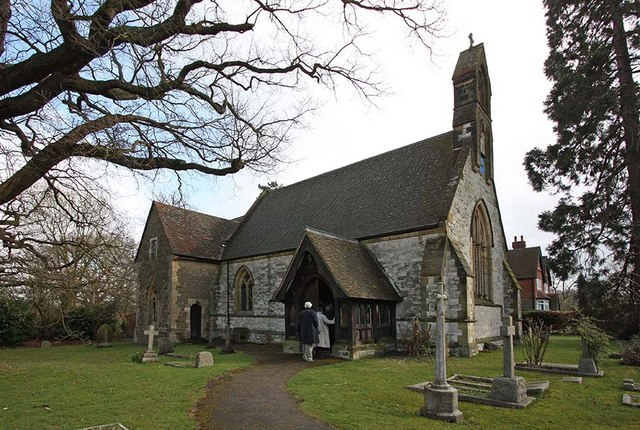
- St Margaret's Church, Underriver

- Location within Kent
- OS grid reference: TQ5552
- District: Sevenoaks
- Shire county: Kent
- Region: South East
- Country: England
- Sovereign state: United Kingdom
- Post town: SEVENOAKS
- Postcode district: TN15
- Dialling code: 01732
- Police: Kent
- Fire: Kent
- Ambulance: South East Coast
- UK Parliament: Sevenoaks

Underriver is a village about 3 miles (5 km) south-east of Sevenoaks, Kent. It is in the civil parish of Seal.

The name "Underriver", standardised from Underevere, is derived from the Old English Sub le Ryver which translates into modern English as "(Place) under the hill-brow". OE under + yfer - the edge or brow of a hill.

The village's church, St Margaret's, is a Grade II listed building. It was built in 1867 to the designs of George Gilbert Scott.

Until the early 20th century, Underriver had its own school, forge, post office, pub and church. Today only the pub and the church remain. The other buildings have since been converted into housing.

Underriver also has its own village hall and an active village association.

== Aircraft accident ==
On 22 August 1927, a Fokker F.VIII of KLM crashed at Underriver following structural failure of the tailfin, killing one of the eleven people on board.
