= Hawthorne C. Gray =

United States Army Air Corps pilot (1889–1927)

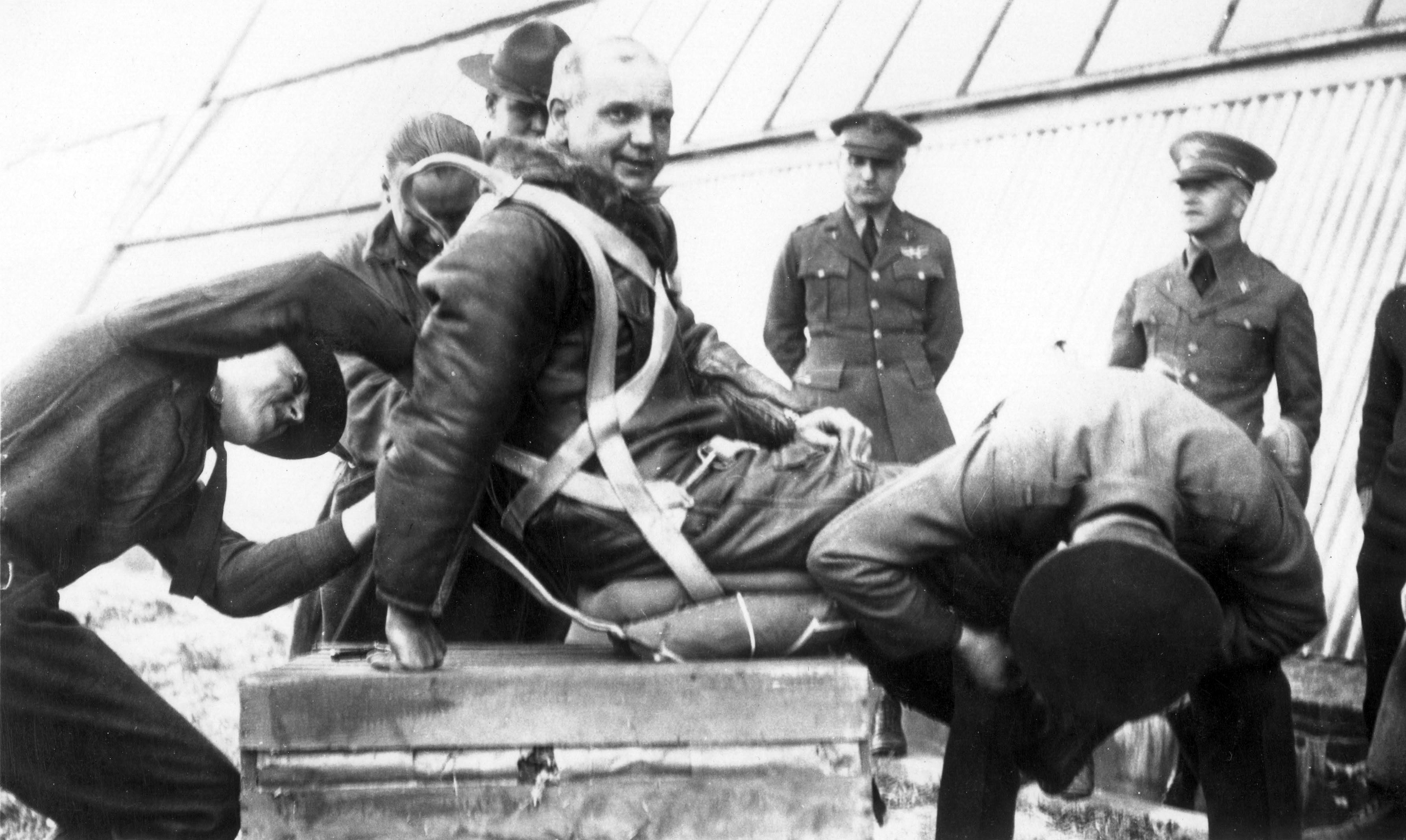
- Gray (center) prior to his final altitude record attempt
- Born: February 16, 1889; Pasco, Washington, U.S.
- Died: November 4, 1927 (aged 38) near Sparta, Tennessee, U.S.
- Burial place: Arlington National Cemetery, Arlington, Virginia
- Military career
- Allegiance: United States of America
- Branch: United States Army
- Service years: 1915–1927
- Rank: Captain
- Awards: Distinguished Flying Cross

Hawthorne Charles Gray (February 16, 1889 – November 4, 1927) was a captain in the United States Army Air Corps. On May 4, 1927, he succeeded in setting a new altitude record in a silk, rubberized, and aluminum-coated balloon launched from Scott Field near Belleville, Illinois, reaching a human world altitude record of 42,470 ft (12.94 km). This record was not recognized by the FAI because Gray parachuted out of the balloon and did not land with his vehicle as per FAI rules. On November 4, 1927, Gray broke his own record by reaching more than 43,000 ft (13.1 km), but died during his descent after his oxygen supply became depleted. The record was recognized by the National Aeronautical Association, but not by the Fédération Aéronautique Internationale because the dead aeronaut "was not in personal possession of his instruments." Gray was posthumously awarded the Distinguished Flying Cross for his three ascents on March 9, May 4 and November 4.

== Early life and career ==
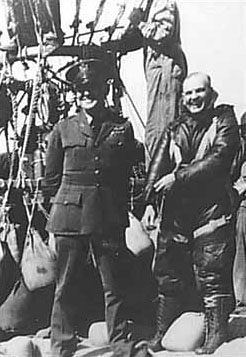
Gray (right) prior to his March 1927 world record attempt.

Gray was born on February 16, 1889, in Pasco, Washington. He was the son of William Polk Gray (1845–1929), a prominent steamboat captain in the Northwestern United States, and Oceana Falkland Bush. Hawthorne Gray was a graduate of the University of Idaho.

Gray served as an officer in the Idaho National Guard and enlisted in the United States Army in 1915, serving as an infantry private in the Pancho Villa Expedition of 1916. Gray was commissioned a second lieutenant on June 2, 1917, and transferred with the rank of captain to what was then the United States Army Air Service in 1920. He began piloting balloons in 1921. He placed third in the 1926 National Balloon Race and second in the 1926 Gordon Bennett balloon race.

== Record-setting balloon flights ==
On March 9, 1927, Gray set an unofficial altitude record of 28,510 ft (8.69 km) in a balloon launched from Scott Field, but passed out from hypoxia in the thin air, regaining consciousness only just in time to drop ballast and slow his fall after the balloon descended on its own. On May 4, Gray set an unofficial record for highest altitude reached by a human being, as he attained 42,470 ft (12.94 km) in a balloon over Belleville. Because of the rapid descent of the balloon, Gray parachuted out at 8,000 feet (2,400 m), disqualifying him from recognition by the Fédération Aéronautique Internationale (FAI), which required that the balloonist land with his craft.

On November 4, Gray attempted to set an official record. He rose at about 4 mph (6.4 km/h), half the speed he used for his March 9 flight. Between 30,000 feet (9,100 m) and 34,000 ft (10.4 km) Gray threw over an empty oxygen cylinder for ballast, and the canister snapped his radio antenna, cutting him off from the ground. After reaching an altitude of 40,000 ft (12.2 km), he lost consciousness. His final journal entry read “Sky deep blue, sun very bright, sand all gone.” His dead body was found in the balloon basket in a tree near Sparta, Tennessee, the next day. The balloon's barographs showed that Gray had reached a height between 43,000 (13.1 km) and 44,000 ft (13.4 km). There were various theories about the cause of Gray's death. He may have severed his oxygen hose accidentally while cutting open bags of sand ballast. It is also possible that Gray became too cold and tired to open the valve on one of his oxygen tanks, or that an internal organ was ruptured by decreasing pressure. Aeronaut Albert Leo Stevens believed that Gray died during descent or on impact. The Scott Field board of inquiry which investigated Gray's death concluded that he died because his clock stopped, causing him to lose track of his time on oxygen and exhaust his supply.

Gray was posthumously awarded the Distinguished Flying Cross and buried in Arlington National Cemetery. His widowed wife and three remaining sons received his Army Air Corps insurance and $2,700, the equivalent of six months’ pay.

== Personal life ==
Gray was married to Miriam Lorette Maddux. They had a son, John Maddux Gray, who died when he was a year old. Gray was survived by his widow and three other sons.

Preceded by John A. Macready	Human altitude record 1927-1931	Succeeded by Auguste Piccard and Paul Kipfer
