= Boeing TB =

American torpedo bomber biplane prototype

TB

General information
- Type: Torpedo bomber
- Manufacturer: Boeing
- Number built: 3

History
- First flight: 4 May 1927
- Developed from: Martin T3M

The Boeing TB (or Model 63) was an American torpedo bomber biplane designed by the US Navy and built by Boeing in 1927.

== Development and design ==
The TB was an improved version of the Martin T3M. It was constructed of all dural, with a fabric covering. The equal-span wings were large and unstaggered, and could be folded aft, reducing the span to 21 feet 8 inches (6.60 m) for storage. The wheeled undercarriage was a conventional configuration that could be interchanged with floats. As a landplane, the main gear units carried twin wheels. The underside of the fuselage incorporated a glazed station for the bombardier.

Even before the three XTB-1s were delivered, the Navy's Bureau of Aeronautics had changed its opinion about what was needed in a torpedo bomber, and based on experience with the NAF XTN-1 had decided that a twin-engine aircraft would better suit the role. Having thus been made redundant, no TBs past the three prototypes were built.

== Specifications ==
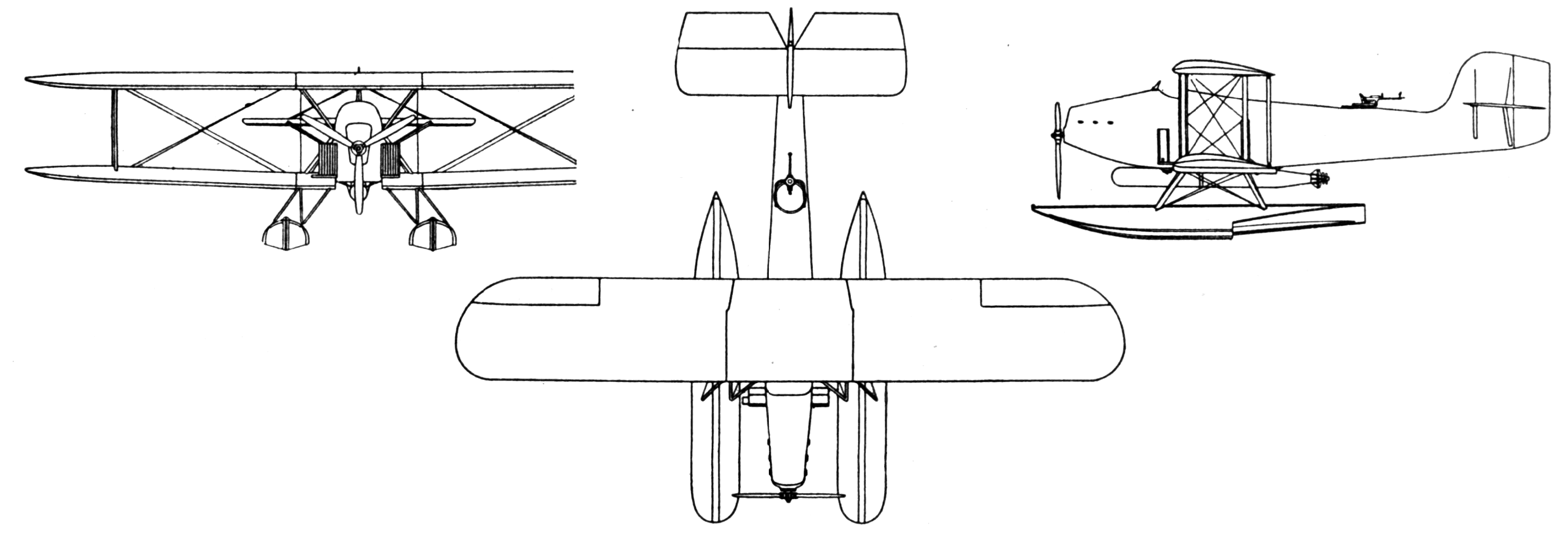
Boeing TB-1 3-view drawing from L'Aéronautique October,1927

Data from Bowers 1966, p. 63

General characteristics

- Crew: Three - pilot, gunner, and bombardier
- Length: 40 ft 10 in (12.45 m)
- Wingspan: 55 ft 0 in (16.76 m)
- Height: 13 ft 6 in (4.12 m)
- Wing area: 868 sq ft (80.6 m^{2})
- Empty weight: 5,640 lb (2,558 kg)
- Gross weight: 9,786 lb (4,339 kg)
- Powerplant: 1 × Packard 3A-2500 , 730 hp (544 kW)

Performance

- Maximum speed: 115 mph (185 km/h, 100 kn)
- Range: 878 mi (1,413 km, 763 nmi)
- Service ceiling: 12,500 ft (3,810 m)
- Rate of climb: 754 ft/min (3.8 m/s)

Armament

- 1 × fixed, forward-firing .30 in (7.62 mm) M1919 Browning machine gun
- 1 × trainable, rearward-firing .30 in (7.62 mm) Browning machine gun
- 1 × Bliss-Leavitt torpedo
