= Fokker F.VIII =

1927 Dutch twin-engined airliner

F.VIII
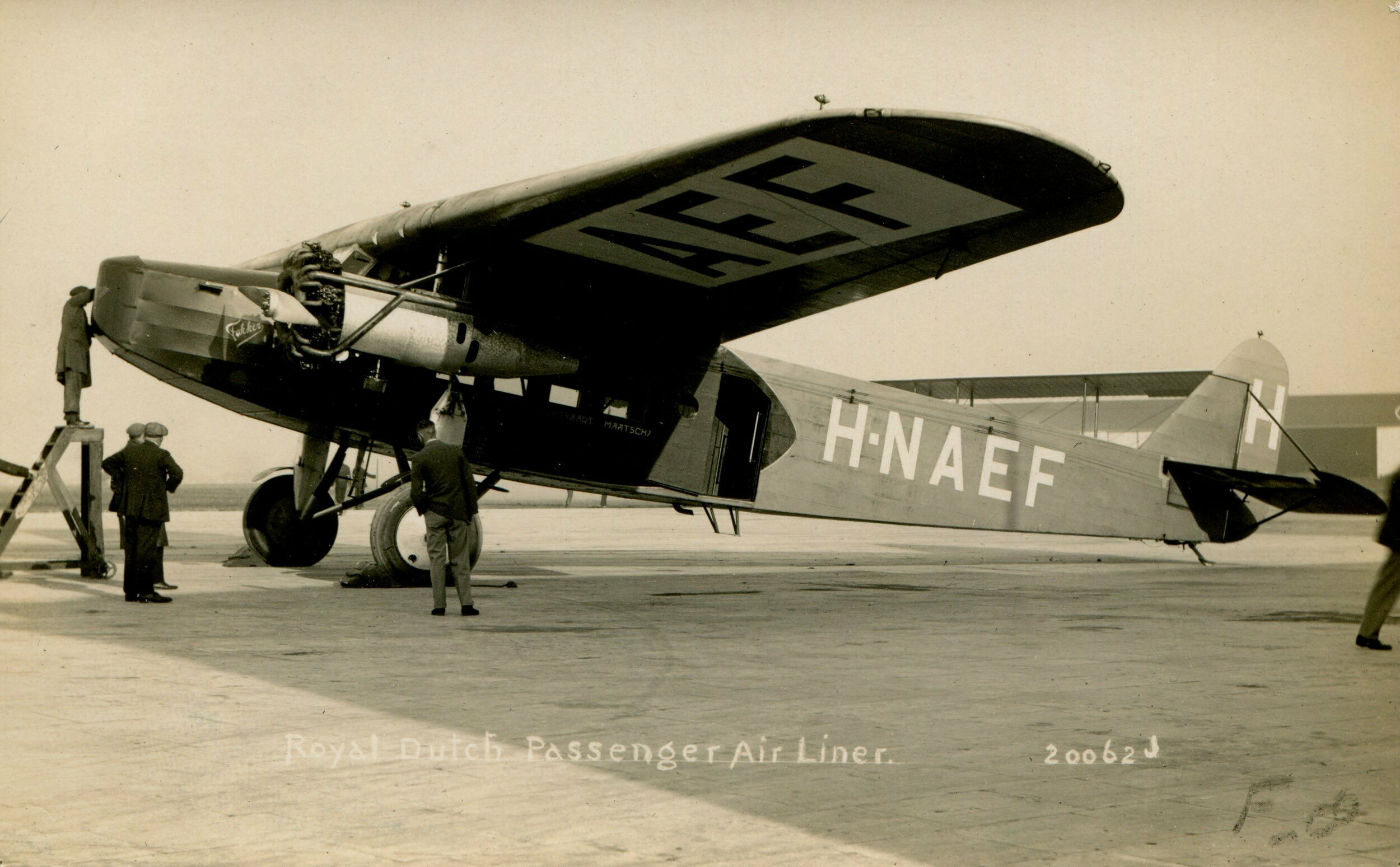
- Fokker F.VIII of KLM airline

General information
- Type: Airliner
- Manufacturer: Fokker
- Designer: Reinhold Platz
- Status: Retired
- Primary users: KLM Malert
- Number built: 11

History
- First flight: 12 March 1927; 99 years ago
- Developed from: Fokker F.VII

The Fokker F.VIII (or F.8) was a large twin-engined airliner designed and produced by the Dutch aircraft manufacturer Fokker in the 1920s.

It was similar overall to the Fokker F.VII which was generally a trimotor, but with a larger body with no nose engine. The F.VIII seated twelve in what was for the period a luxury seating setup.

In the same family of aircraft was the even larger F.IX, or F-9, which used a trimotor configuration.

== Design and development ==
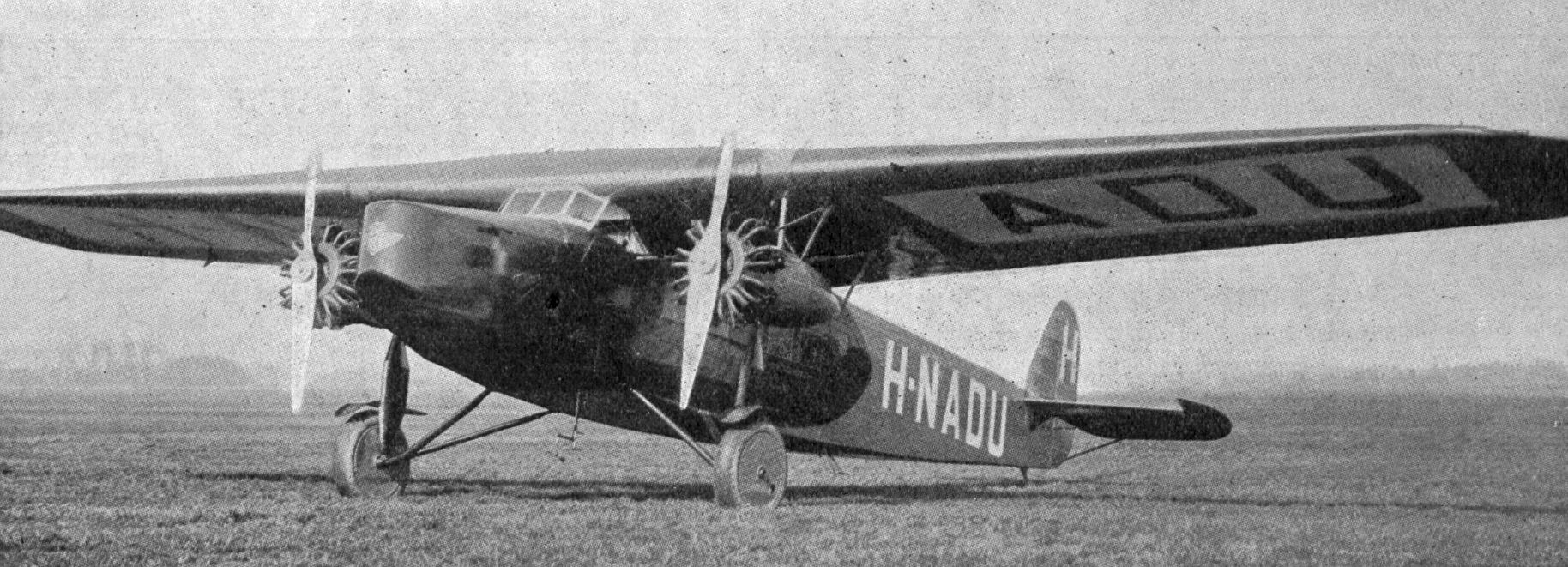
A Fokker F.VIII in 1927

In 1926, the Dutch airline KLM issued a request for an airliner with more passenger capacity than the F.VII variants in operation at the time. Designer Reinhold Platz immediately started work on the F.VIII in response.

The F.VIII featured mixed construction: fuselage and tail section were constructed as a frame of welded steel covered with plywood (sometimes known as multiplex), canvas and duralumin, but the wing framing was all wood covered with plywood. This had become standard Fokker construction and the result was one of their characteristic cantilever high-winged monoplanes.

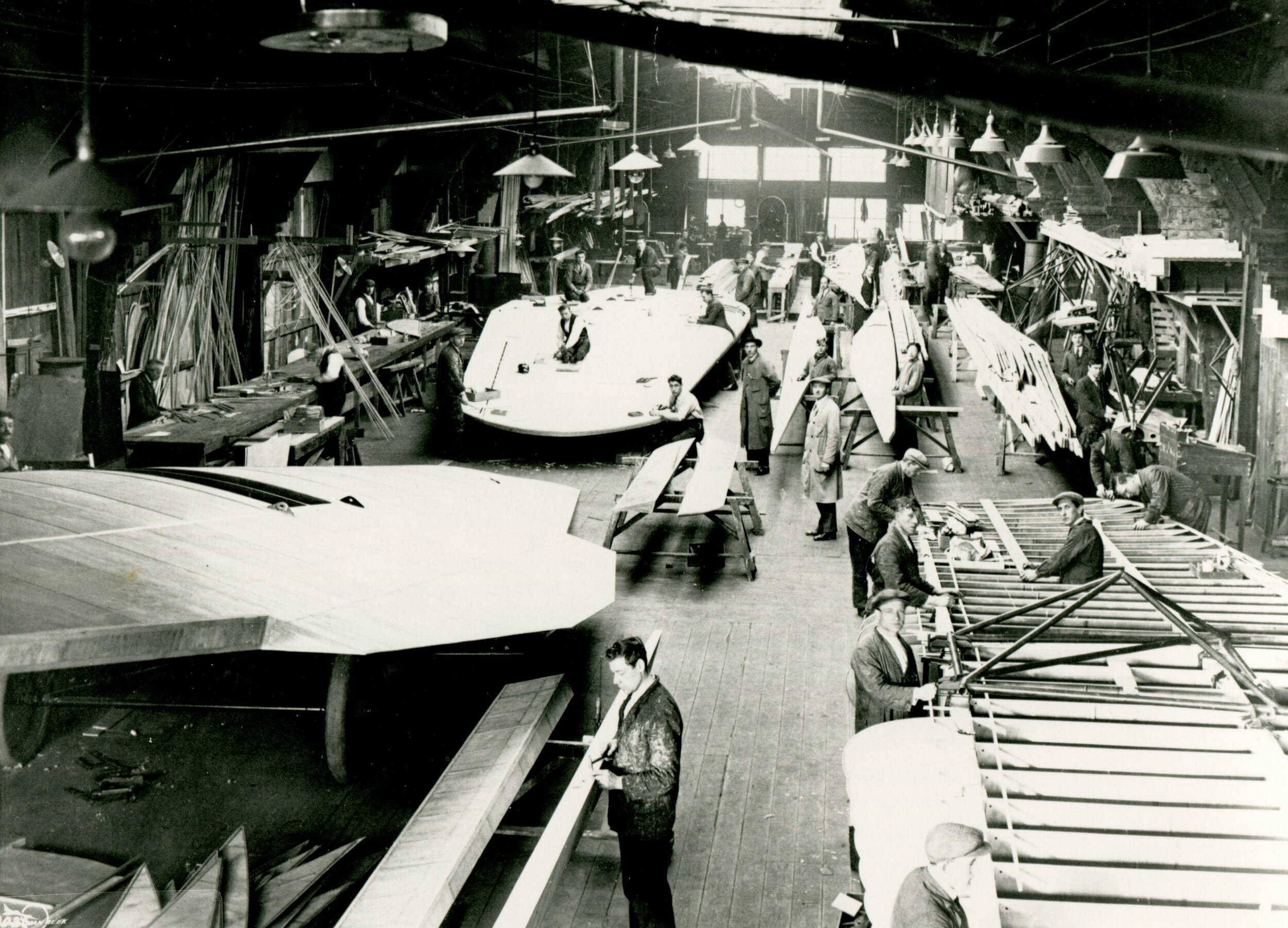
Manufacturing the Fokker F.VIII

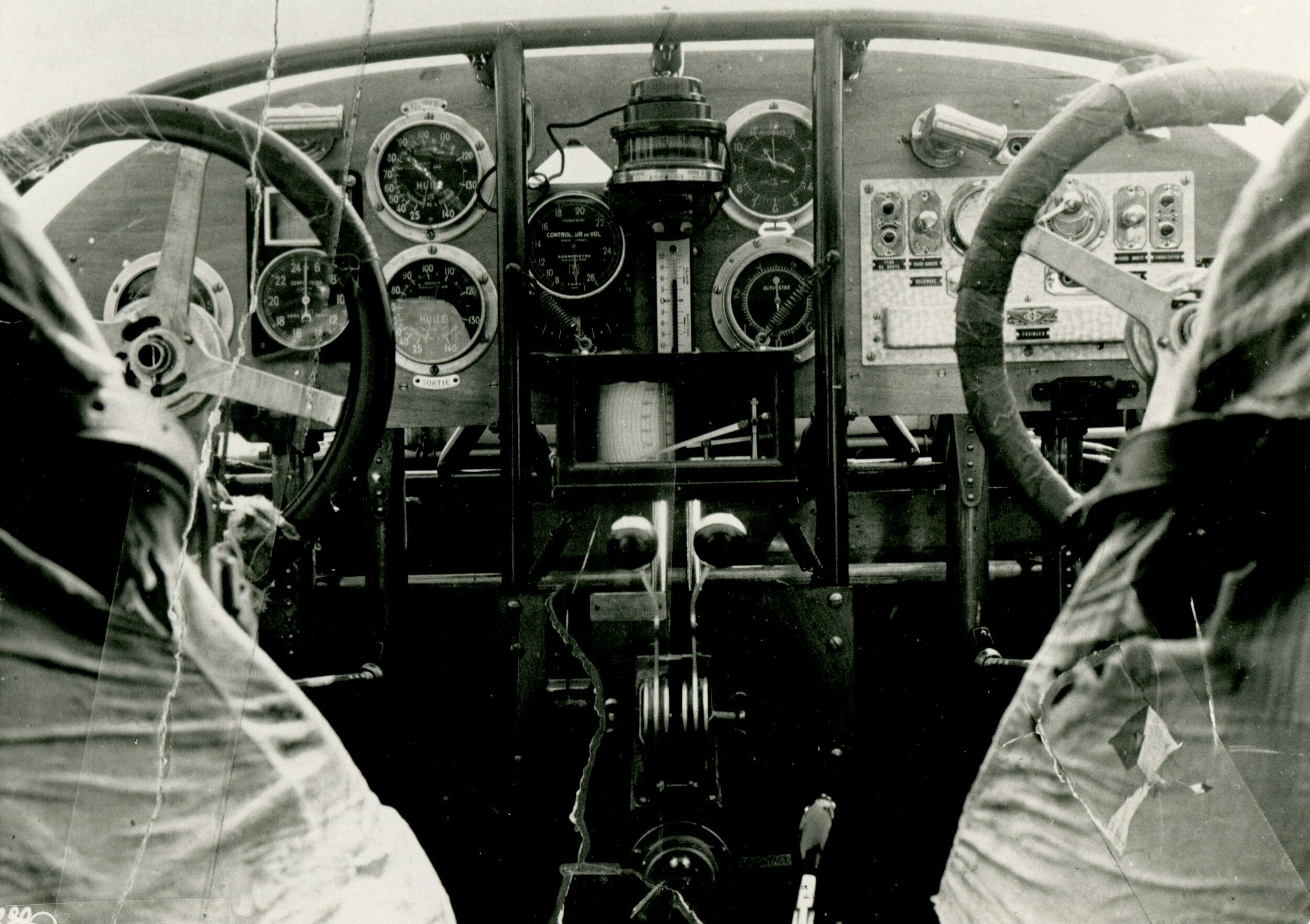
Fokker F.VIII cockpit

The F.VIII was Fokker's first twin-engined airliner, a reflection of the increasing power available from the light radials engines of the time. All their previous designs had an engine in the nose, and its absence in the F.VIII lead to less prop-wash wear and tear on the fuselage and much lower vibration levels for passengers. The first aircraft used 358 kW (480 hp) Bristol Jupiter radial engines built under licence by Gnome-Rhone, strut mounted and uncowled under the wings. KLM later re-engined theirs with 391 kW (525 hp) Pratt and Whitney Wasp T1D1 radials, cowled with Townend rings and mounted further forward than the Jupiters. One aircraft, which for part of its life flew as PH-OTO was used to explore the effects of mounting engines in, rather than below the wing. There were concerns that this arrangement, which became standard in later propeller driven aircraft would seriously disturb the airflow over the upper wing. It used 589 kW (790 hp) Wright Cyclones.

The standard cabin accommodated 15 passengers seated three abreast, but KLM chose a more luxurious 12-seat arrangement, well received at the time.

The prototype made its maiden flight on March 12, 1927. 11 F.VIII aircraft were built, three under licence by Manfréd Weiss in Budapest. Fokker designed, but did not build a seaplane version designated F.VIII-W. A three-engined version, the F.VIII/3m, was also proposed, but remained a project. A version with two wing-mounted Pratt & Whitney Wasp engines was proposed as the Model 118, but this too remained a project.

== Operational history ==
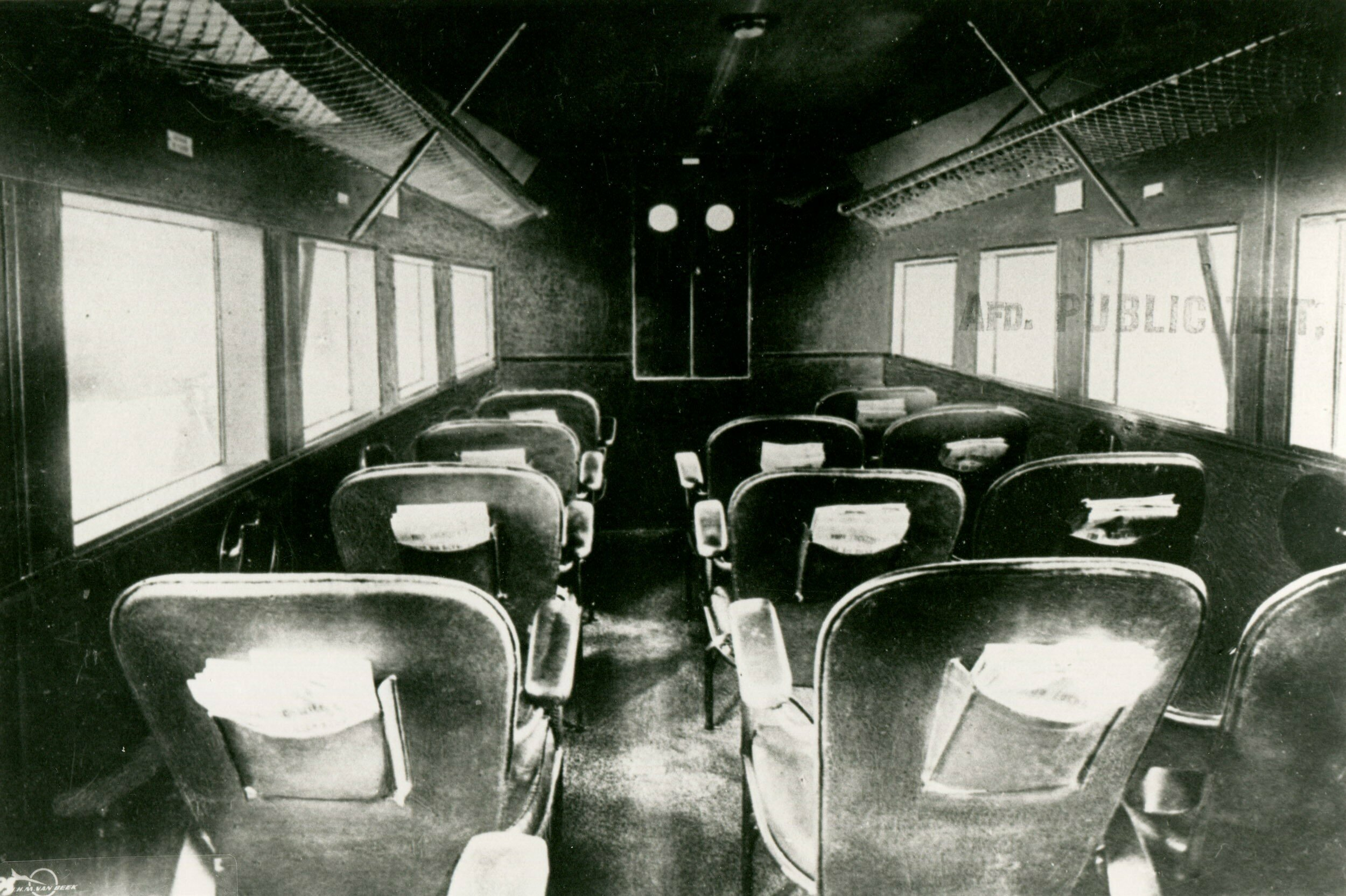
The comfortable seating and spacious 15 passenger cabin of the F.VIII.

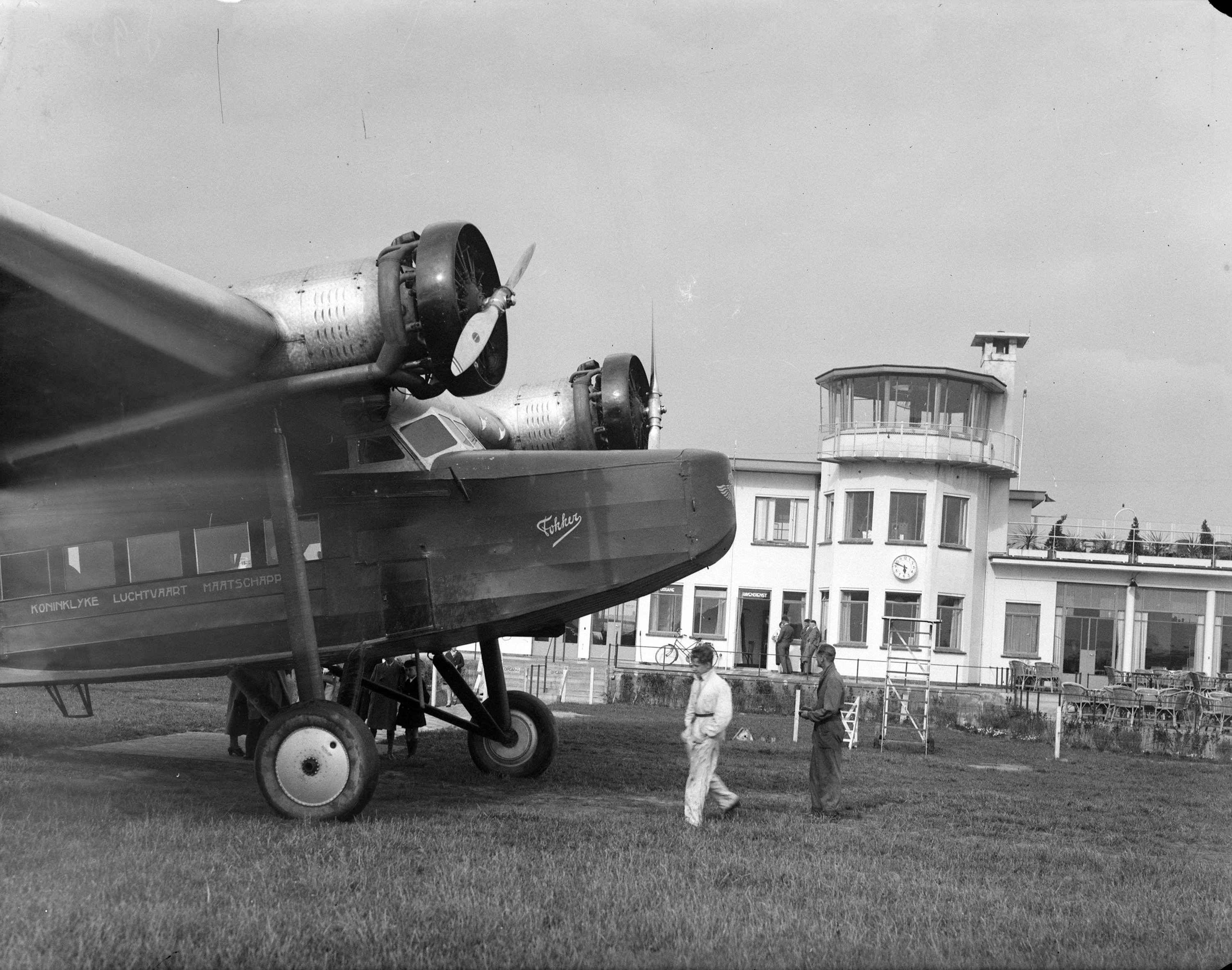
Fokker F.VIII (8) at Eindhoven, NL

KLM accepted delivery of the first of their seven on June 24, 1927. They were used exclusively on the European routes. The Hungarian Malert company bought one aircraft and had another three built under licence at the Manfréd Weiss factory, all using Gnome-Rhône Jupiter 9A engines. These Budapest airliners flew on Malert's short haul routes; two were lost in crashes.

In 1936, two of KLM's Wasp-powered aircraft were sold to British Airways for use on their cross channel routes. In 1937, KLM's PH-AED was sold to Venezuela. In 2001 the wreck of the PH-AED was salvaged by a team from the Aviodrome museum where the remains still are in storage in the Netherlands. On the eve of war in 1939, one of KLM's F.VIII's, PH-AEG, was transferred to the Swedish Air Force via ABA. Thus the airplane first flew with civil identification code SE-AEB but later on it got its Swedish Air Force designation, 916. This Fokker type was called Tp 10 in Swedish service. Another ex-KLM aircraft flew Sweden as SE-AHA (sse below).

=== Finnish service ===
The Finnish Air Force's sole Fokker F.VIII was the ex-KLM Wasp-powered H-NAEI, production number 5046. KLM's West Indies division used it for regular passenger service with registration PH-AEI. In 1937, it was sold to British Airways Ltd, where it was registered as G-AEPU and used to transport passengers across the English Channel. Swedish company G.A. Flygrender purchased the aircraft in 1939, and it was ferried to Sweden via Amsterdam, Copenhagen and Torslanda on April 7, 1939. In Sweden, registered as SE-AHA the aircraft mainly flew in the Gothenburg area.

During the Winter War, the Swedish National Socialist organization Nationella Samlingen organized a national fundraising drive for Finland's anti-Bolshevik war. With money obtained, it purchased the above-mentioned F.VIII from G.A. Flygrederi, for 73,500 Swedish kronor. Thus, Swedish SE-AHA became Finnish OH-FOA and was flown to Finland on 11 November 1940. Once in the Finnish Air Force, it was given code FE-1. Due to the bad condition of its wings, it first had to be overhauled. It took until 4 August 1941 before the plane was transferred to LeLv 46. There, it was mainly used to transport wounded soldiers from the island of Lunkula. Ten flights were made before the aircraft was destroyed on 27 September 1941, due to engine failure caused by air in the fuel system. The crew escaped unharmed despite their crash-landing in the woods; they were transporting at least one seriously injured passenger at that moment.

== Accidents and incidents ==
- On 22 August 1927, H-NADU of KLM crashed near Sevenoaks, Kent following loss of the tailfin.
- On August 10, 1938, a Malert F.VIII crashed on climbout from Debrecen Airport, killing all 12 passengers and crew on board.
- On 27 December 1938, a 10-year-old boy from the island of Urk in the Netherlands was killed when he was struck by the tailfin of a flight delivering the mail during the winter freeze.

== Operators ==
=== Civil ===
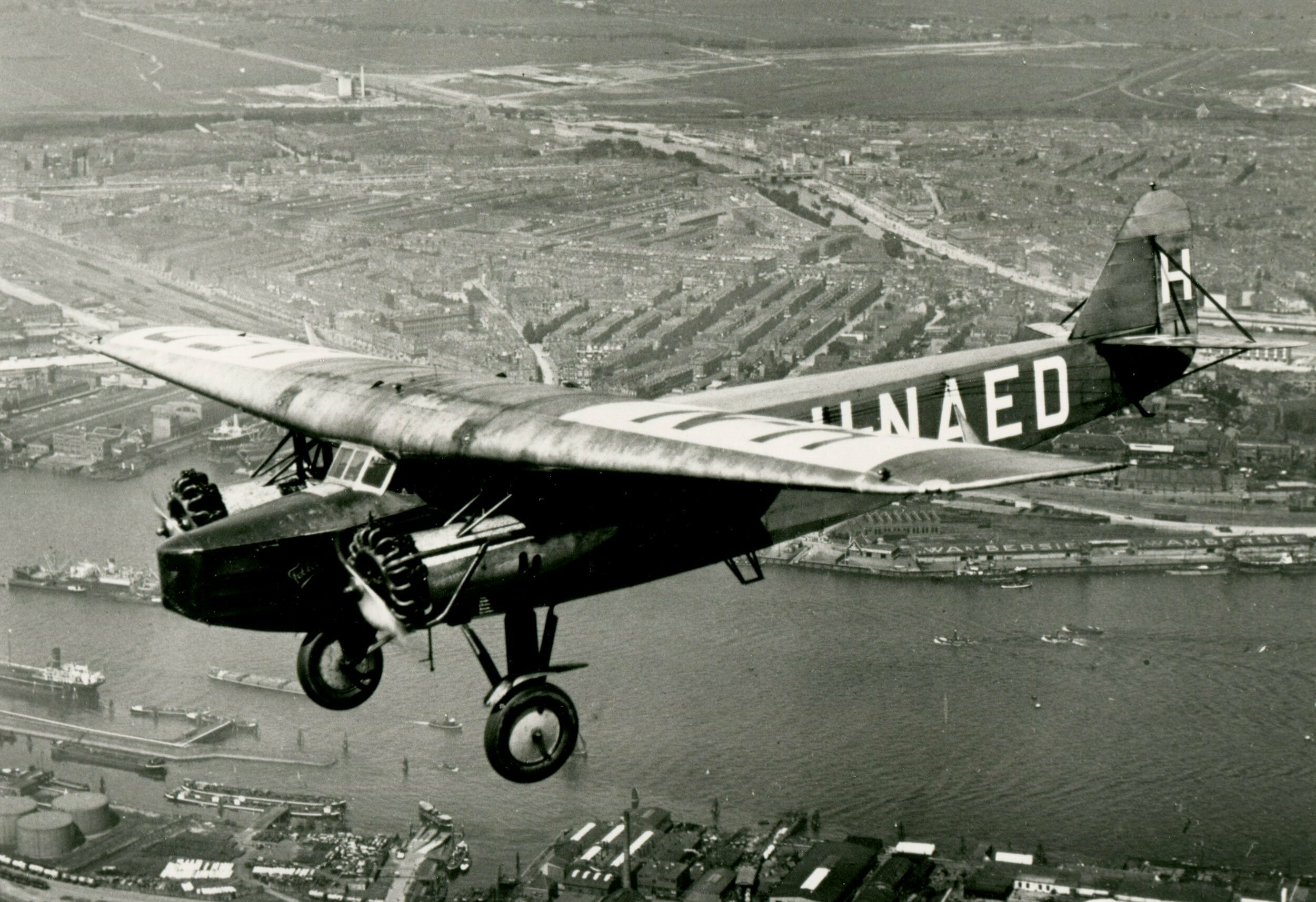
KLM F.VIII over Rotterdam

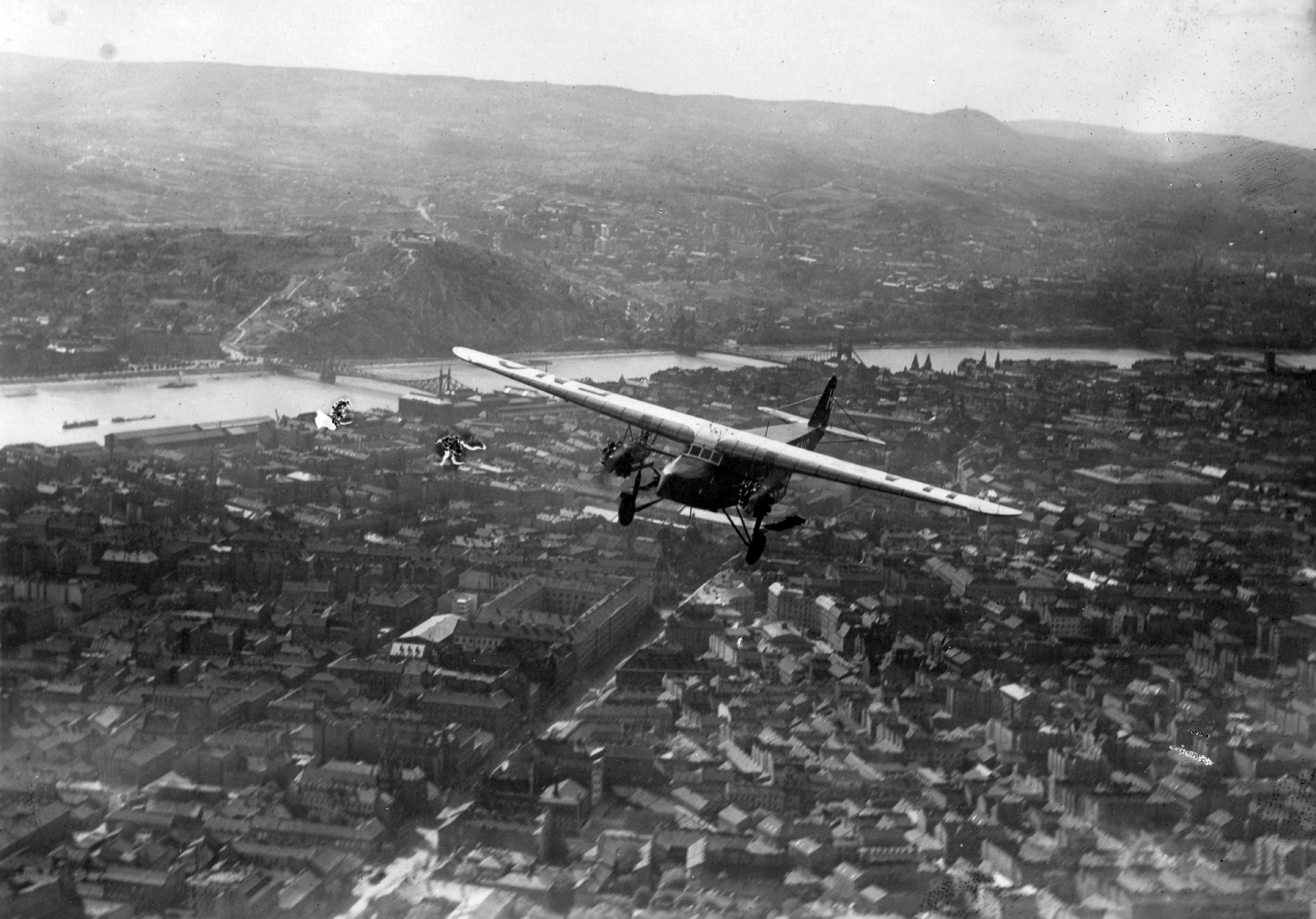
Fokker F.VIII over Budapest, Hungary

Netherlands

- KLM

Hungary

- Malert

Sweden

- ABA

United Kingdom

- British Airways

=== Military ===
Finland

- Finnish Air Force

Hungary

- Hungarian Air Force

Sweden

- Swedish Air Force - (Tp 10)

== Specifications (Jupiter-engined) ==
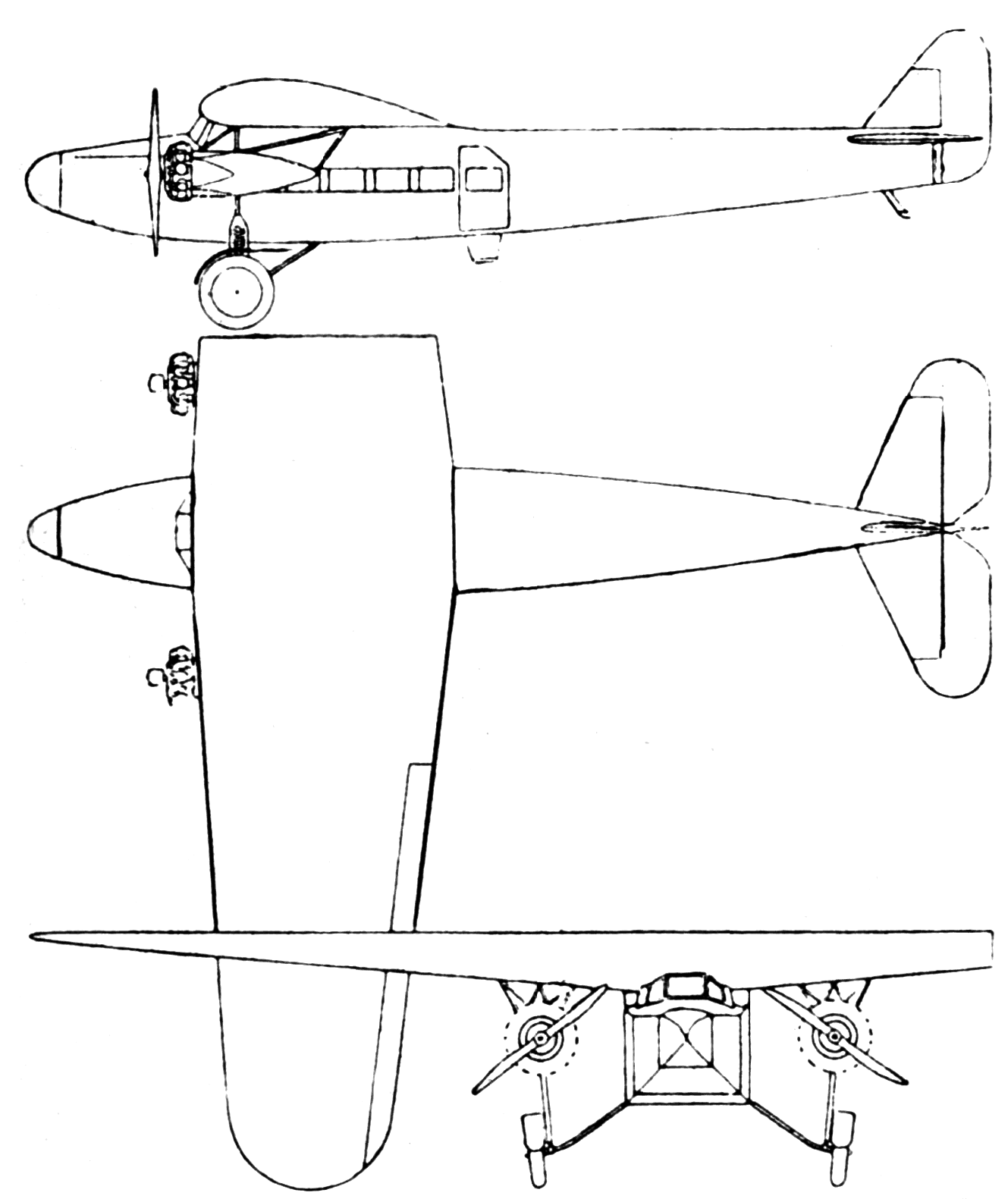
Fokker F.VIII 3-view drawing from L'Air February 15,1927

Data from de Leuuw pp 64-7

General characteristics

- Crew: 2
- Capacity: 15 passengers
- Length: 16.8 m (55 ft 1 in)
- Wingspan: 23 m (75 ft 6 in)
- Height: 4.2 m (13 ft 9 in)
- Wing area: 82 m^{2} (880 sq ft)
- Empty weight: 3,350 kg (7,385 lb)
- Max takeoff weight: 5,800 kg (12,787 lb)
- Powerplant: 2 × Bristol Jupiter IV 9-cyl. air-cooled radial piston engines, 360 kW (480 hp) each

2 x licence-built Gnome-Rhône Jupiter

Performance

- Maximum speed: 140 km/h (87 mph, 76 kn)
- Cruise speed: 117 km/h (73 mph, 63 kn)
- Range: 700 km (430 mi, 380 nmi)
- Service ceiling: 5,500 m (18,000 ft)

== See also ==
Aircraft of comparable role, configuration, and era

- Ford Tri-Motor

Related lists

- List of aircraft
- List of military aircraft of Sweden
- List of aircraft of the Finnish Air Force

== Bibliography ==
- de Leeuv, Fokker Commercial Aircraft, (1994). Fokker. The Hague, Haagste Drukkerij
- A.J.Jackson, British Civil Aircraft 1919-1972 (1973). London: Putnam Press ISBN 0-85177-813-5

== Sources ==
- Timo Heinonen: Thulinista Hornetiin - Keski-Suomen ilmailumuseon julkaisuja 3, 1992. ISBN 951-95688-2-4
- Matti Hämäläinen: Pommituslentolaivue 46, Koala-Kustannus 2005. ISBN 952-5186-61-X
- . The English part of this page contains the text, though not the specs from de Leeuw.
