= Naval Aircraft Factory NO =

NO
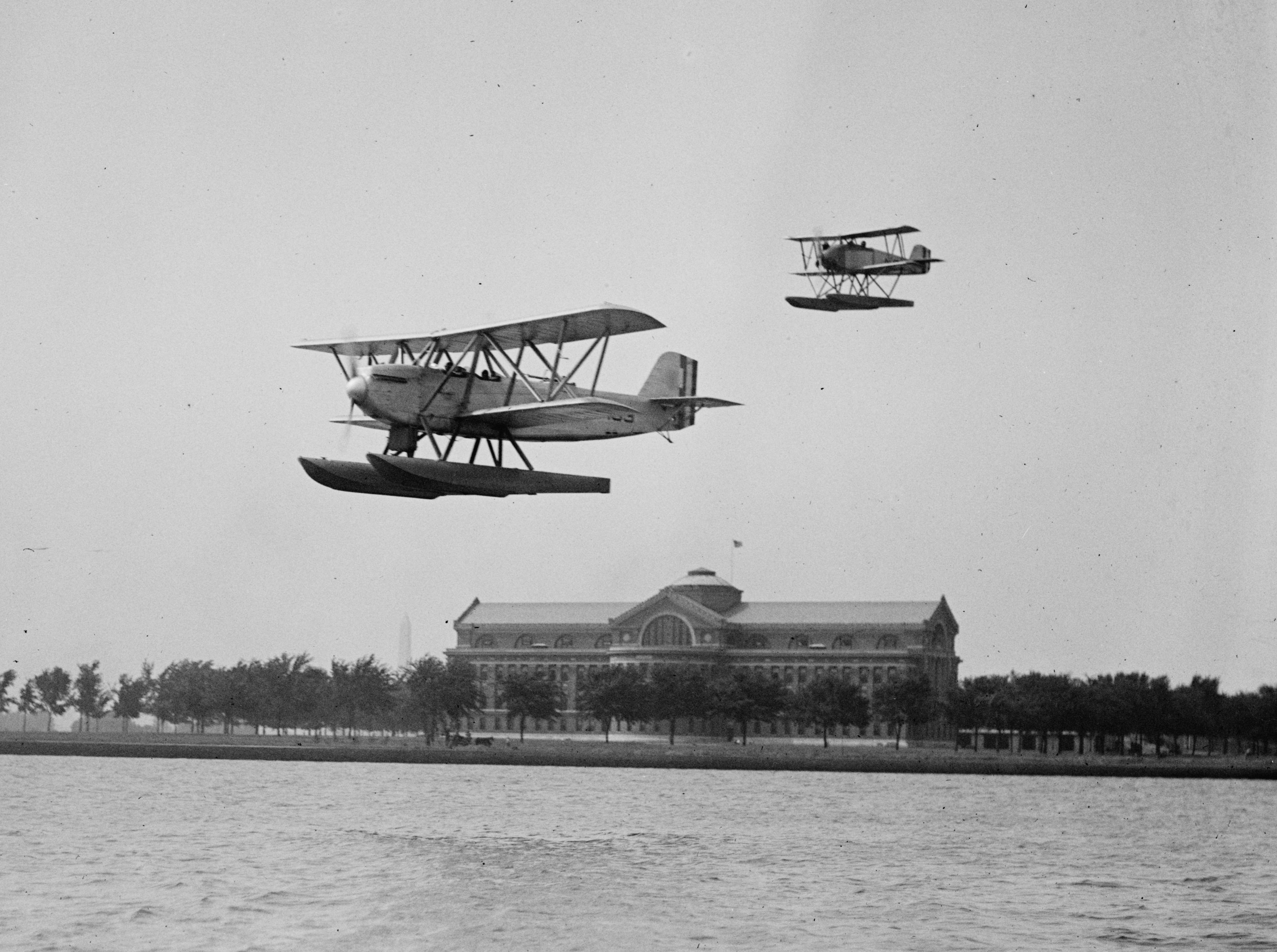
- Martin M2O-1 leading a Martin MS-1 in July 1923

General information
- Type: Naval observation floatplane
- National origin: United States
- Manufacturer: Naval Aircraft Factory, Martin
- Designer: Bureau of Aeronautics
- Primary user: United States Navy
- Number built: 6

History
- First flight: 1923
- Retired: 1927

Naval Aircraft Factory NO was an American short-range reconnaissance/gun spotting aircraft of the 1920s. A single-engined three-seat biplane with alternative floats or wheels, six were built for the U.S. Navy.

== Development and design ==
The NO was designed at the U.S. Navy Bureau of Aeronautics (BuAer) as a single-engined single-bay sesquiplane capable of being fitted with either a conventional tailwheel undercarriage or two floats. It was fitted with a 435 hp (324 kW) Curtiss D-12 water-cooled V-12 engine, with a radiator installed between the floats or wheels, depending on such configuration.

The design featured the use of W-type (aka Warren truss) and N-type wing bracing struts, that offered both compression and tension resistance to static and dynamic loads, instead of the traditional tension wires employed on many biplanes of the period. This structural principle had been incorporated successfully in the design of the Naval Aircraft Factory TS fighter, as designed by Rex Beisel when employed at BuAer, and later also used on the Martin MS submarine-based biplane that required rapid assembly and rigging.

The three crew occupied separate open cockpit stations, and the rearmost cockpit was equipped with a swivel-mounted machine gun for defense. Small differences observed between the Martin and NAF versions included exhaust stacks, fin and rudder shapes, and presence or omission of a propeller spinner.

== Operational history ==
In 1923, pre-production construction contracts were issued to both the Naval Aircraft Factory (NAF) and Glenn L. Martin Company (as Martin Model 60), each for three aircraft, designated Naval Aircraft Factory NO and Martin M2O respectively. Deliveries of the Martin M2O-1 started in 1923, and all six aircraft were completed by the end of 1924. The NAF-built aircraft were assigned serial numbers A-6431 to A-6433 (initially designated as NO-1), and A-6452 to A-6454 were assigned to the Martin M2O-1 aircraft. Subsequently, the third NO-1 (serial number A-6433) was converted with a 440 hp Packard 1A-1500 and redesignated as NO-2. Photos have shown that at least two Martin M2O-1 (A-6452 and A-6454), were configured with wheeled undercarriage during their service.

The type proved to be no better than the Vought UO in the gun spotting role, and was never placed into quantity production. All six were withdrawn from use by the end of 1927.

== Variants ==
NO-1
Three-seat twin-float floatplane powered by a 435 hp (324 kW) Curtiss D-12 water-cooled V-12 engine. Three built by the Naval Aircraft Factory.
NO-2
The third, and last, NO-1 was modified with a 425hp (317 kW) Packard 1A-1500 water-cooled V-12 engine, and redesignated NO-2.
M2O-1
Designation of Martin-built NO-1, three built.

== Specifications ==
Data from United States Navy Aircraft since 1911

General characteristics

- Crew: 3
- Length: 31 ft 10 in (9.7 m)
- Wingspan: 43 ft 6 in (13.29 m)
- Gross weight: 4,173 lb (1,893 kg)
- Powerplant: 1 × Curtiss D-12 , 435 hp (324 kW)
- Propellers: 2-bladed

Performance

- Maximum speed: 104 mph (167 km/h, 90 kn)

Armament

- Guns: 1x .30-cal Lewis machine gun

== See also ==
- 1922 United States Navy aircraft designation system
