= Henry C. Mustin Naval Air Facility =

- Mustin Field
- Part of Naval Aircraft Factory
- Philadelphia, Pennsylvania, U.S. in United States
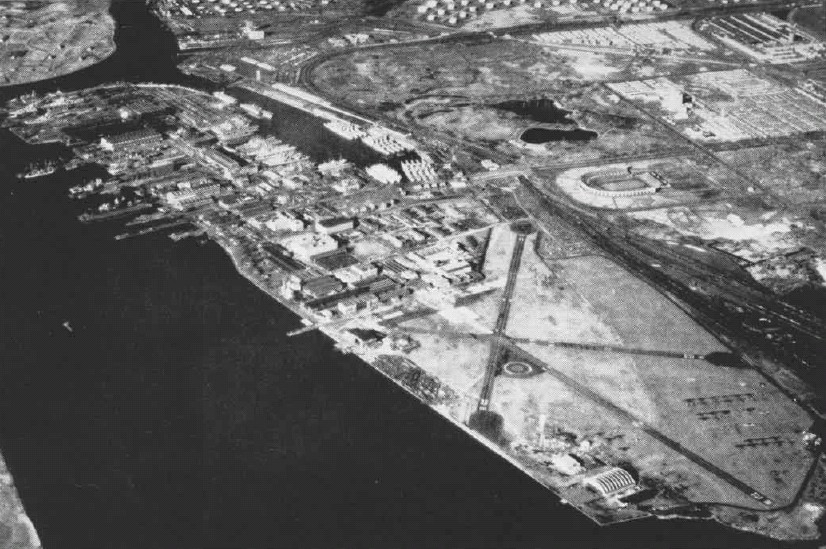
- An aerial view of South Philadelphia, including the Naval Air Material Center, Mustin Field, and the shipyard, published in Naval Aviation News, c. 1947

Site information
- Type: Naval Air Facility
- Owner: United States Navy
- Controlled by: United States Navy
- Open to the public: Yes

Location
- Location of Mustin Naval Air Facility in Pennsylvania Mustin NAF (MUV) (the United States)
- Coordinates: 39°53′33″N 75°9′22″W

Site history
- Built: 1926
- Built by: United States Army Corps of Engineers
- In use: 1926–1963
- Fate: Mainly intact, partial demolition
- Events: World War II

Airfield information
- Identifiers: IATA: MUV, ICAO: KMUV
- Elevation: 12 ft (4 m) AMSL
Runways
Direction	Length and surface
5/23	3,150 ft (960 m) Asphalt
9/27	6,135 ft (1,870 m) Asphalt
14/32	4,000 ft (1,220 m) Asphalt

Henry C. Mustin Naval Air Facility (IATA: MUV, ICAO: KMUV), also known as NAF Mustin Field, is a former military airfield located at the United States Navy Naval Aircraft Factory on board the Philadelphia Naval Shipyard, Philadelphia, Pennsylvania. It was in service from 1926 to 1963.

== History ==
On 27 July 1917, Secretary of the Navy Josephus Daniels approved the development of a Naval Aircraft Factory as a Navy-owned aircraft design, production and evaluation facility. The factory opened 17 November 1917. Production of H-16 and MF flying boats began in 1918. Following World War I, "the factory's role was altered from production-focused to evaluation of different aircraft designs, with its production being limited to mainly prototype and small production lots of aircraft." The NAF produced Vought VE-7 airframes when the small Lewis & Vought organization was unable to handle a large production order. The factory also constructed nine Curtiss TS-1s, −2s, and −3s in 1922 for cost comparisons and performance evaluations with different powerplants.

As the Navy introduced progressively more land based aircraft in the 1920s, the need for a landing field at the Naval Aircraft Factory grew, under the control of the Fourth Naval District.

In 1926, the eastern end of the Back Channel of League Island in the Delaware River was landfilled to create space for flight operations, after the training school at Naval Air Station Rockaway in Rockaway, New York, was closed. League Island ceased to be one with this change, the western end of Back Channel becoming the Reserve Basin for the Navy Yard, holding a portion of the U.S. Navy reserve fleets.

=== Dedication ===
The aerodrome was established as Naval Air Facility Mustin Field on 17 September 1926, in honor of Captain Henry C. Mustin, Navy Air Pilot No.3, and Naval Aviator No. 11, who recorded the first catapult launch from a moving vessel on 5 November 1915 when he flew off of USS North Carolina in a Curtiss Model AB-2.

"It was a major event that drew 1,500 spectators, among them Assistant Secretary of the Navy, Theodore Douglas Robinson, Brig. Gen. Douglas MacArthur, Rear Admiral William Moffett, and Philadelphia Mayor W. Freeland Kendrick, who had been a childhood friend of Capt. Mustin. The dedication took place toward the end of the six-month Philadelphia Sesquicentennial Exposition, whose president was John Wanamaker. Thirty foreign nations attended the Sesqui, and all the planes from the exhibition flew in formation with aircraft of the Army, Navy, and Marine Corps to honor Mustin."

With the airship USS Los Angeles circling above, Mustin's most senior classmate, Captain William L. Littlefield, commander of the yard, unveiled a monument with a plate reading, "This Tablet Erected By His Naval Academy Classmates." "The ceremonies continued with a skywriting of 'Mustin Field,' a flyover that cascaded flowers onto the tablet, a bombing demonstration by three Martin bombers, and a series of stunts culminating in 'bubble busting' where aircraft chased balloons until breaking them all."

The station consisted of 53 enlisted, 16 officers, four seaplanes and seven landplanes. Throughout the 1930s, the field hosted a variety of test operations, conducted by experimental test squadron VX-3D4. The Naval Aircraft Factory produced 997 N3N primary training biplanes from 1935 to 1942.

The Status of Naval Aircraft, dated June 1937, lists the following as assigned at the Naval Aircraft Factory: 1 XRK-1, 2 O2U-3, 1 XO4U-2, 1 XO5U-1, 1 SU-1, 2 SU-2, 1 T4M-1, and 1 NT-1. The following are listed for NAF Repair, Storage and Test: 1 O2U-2; 4 SOC-2 for USS Philadelphia; 1 XSOE-1; 1 XSO2C-1 for Anacostia; 1 XSBC-3 for catapult test; 2 SU-1 for NAF Operations; one FF-2 for vibration test and then transfer to NRAB Kansas City; 1 XFD-1 for Norfolk; 2 BF2C-1, 1 for vibration test, 1 for disposition; 1 XF3F-2 for Anacostia; 1 BG-1 for Norfolk; 1 BM-2 for Naval Operations; 1 TG-2 for Anacostia; 1 NS-1 for vibration tests; 4 NT-1; 2 N2Y-1; 1 XN3N-1 for special flight tests.

In 1939 the base was redesignated Naval Reserve Air Base Mustin Field and became a primary flight training unit.

=== World War II ===
With the creation of Naval Air Station Patuxent River in Maryland, in 1942, testing was consolidated there that had been previously done at several locations, including the Naval Aircraft Factory, the U.S. Naval Proving Ground at Dahlgren, Virginia, Naval Air Station Norfolk, Virginia, the Washington Navy Yard, and Naval Air Station Anacostia, both in Washington, D.C.

Finding that the worldwide demand for regular production PBY Catalinas from the Consolidated Aircraft Corporation outstripped the firm's capacity, the U.S. Navy instead ordered the Naval Air Facility to begin production of its own version of the aircraft, which became known as the PBN-1 Nomad. "Eventually producing 156 of the type by war's end, mainly for lend-lease to the Soviet Union, the Naval Air Facility also built well over 400 other aircraft of various types for use by US Forces by 1945. Even with such heavy production taking place, the Naval Air Facility maintained its busy schedule of aircraft evaluation on numerous different varieties of aircraft built for US Navy service, and even conducted extensive research into converting the famed P-51 Mustang into a carrier-capable aircraft."

After satellite fields were added in 1942 due to the pace of instruction, one, Pitcairn Airfield, was to become the replacement for NRAB Mustin on 1 January 1943, when it was redesignated NAS Hatboro, Pennsylvania. The NRAB was moved to the new air station, but was soon renamed when its mailing address was moved to a new post office at Willow Grove, Pennsylvania. Mustin Field was redesignated a Naval Auxiliary Air Station for flight testing with the Philadelphia Naval Aircraft Factory on 20 July 1943. The Naval Aircraft Factory was redesignated the Naval Air Material Center in 1943.

"At the end of the war construction program, the Naval Air Material Center occupied 500 acres adjacent to the Philadelphia Navy Yard, and 369 acres at the modification unit at Johnsville. Seven hangars, including two seaplane hangars, three bituminous runways, two seaplane ramps, a quarter of a million square yards of concrete and composite aircraft parking as well as nearly a hundred buildings had been constructed."

The Naval Aircraft Factory was renamed the Naval Air Engineering Facility (Ships Installations) on 26 April 1956. Its revised mission included research, engineering, design, development, and limited manufacturing of devices and equipment for aircraft and guided missile launch and recovery. The redesignation ceremony occurred on 1 June.

It was formally disestablished on 7 October 1958.

=== Closing ===
Increased air traffic using near-by Philadelphia International Airport began to severely hinder operations at the Naval Air Facility by the 1960s, and by late 1962 the majority of commands and research groups which occupied the base had been relocated to Naval Air Station Lakehurst, New Jersey. "The Navy officially closed the Henry C. Mustin Naval Air Facility in 1963 and signed the land over to the Philadelphia Naval Shipyard, which constructed housing on a portion of the former airfield for yard workers but left much of the land unused.

After the closing of the shipyard in 1995, all Naval activity at the site ceased and the land was given to the City of Philadelphia. Several of the Naval Air Facility's buildings have been repurposed and much of the land is slated for redevelopment.
