= T2D =

T2D can refer to:

- Douglas T2D, an American twin-engined torpedo bomber, 1927–1937
- River Torrens to Darlington section of the North–South Motorway, Adelaide, South Australia
- Type 2 diabetes, a disease
