= Jerome Clarke Hunsaker =

American aeronautical engineer (1886–1984)

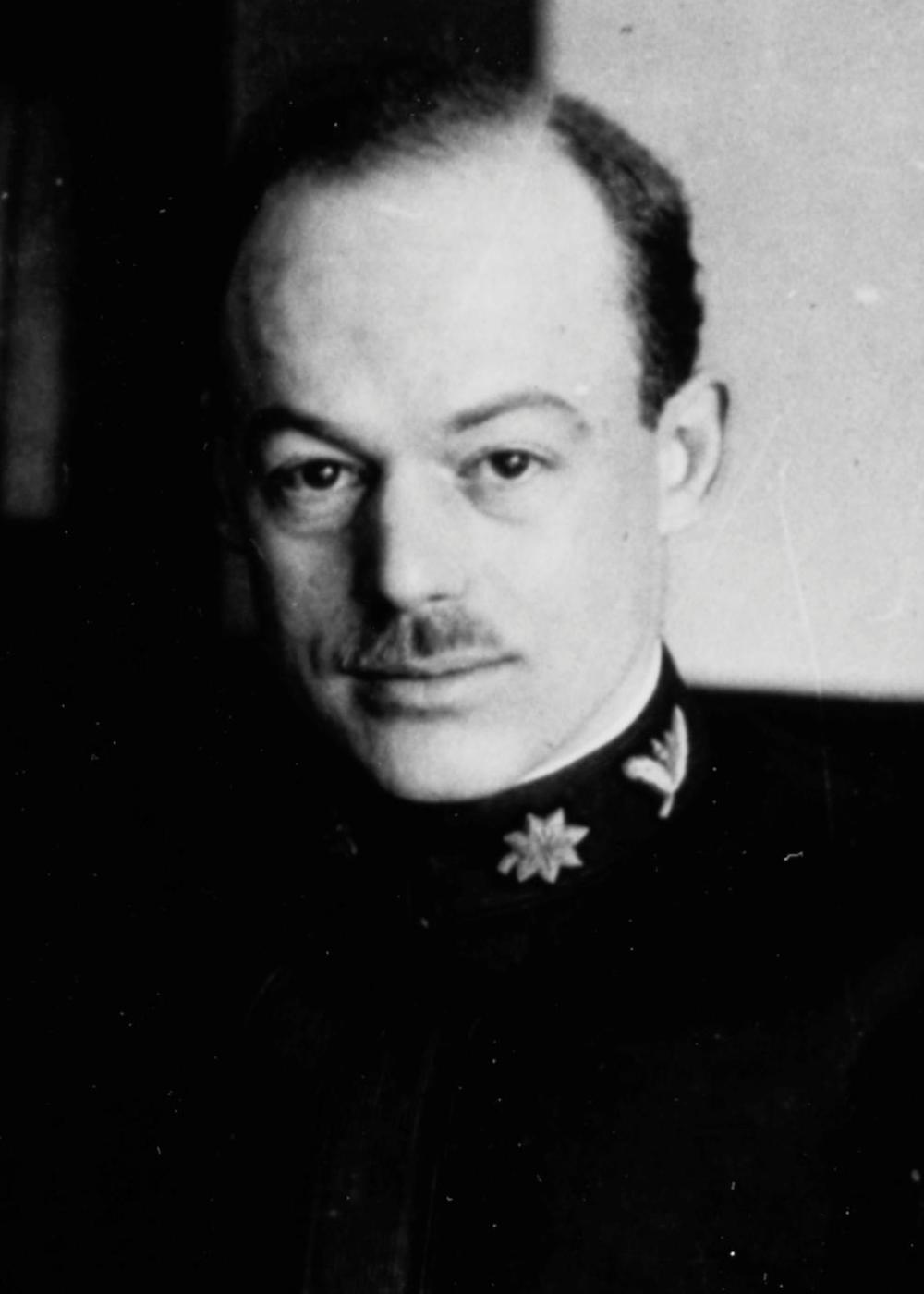
- Lt. Cmdr. Hunsaker, circa 1917
- Born: August 26, 1886; Creston, Iowa
- Died: September 10, 1984 (aged 98); Boston, Massachusetts
- Citizenship: American
- Education: United States Naval Academy Massachusetts Institute of Technology
- Known for: pioneering research in aeronautics
- Awards: Langley Gold Medal (1955); Wright Brothers Memorial Trophy (1951); Medal for Merit (1946); Edward Longstreth Medal (1942); Daniel Guggenheim Medal (1933)
- Scientific career
- Fields: Aeronautics
- Workplaces: Massachusetts Institute of Technology; Goodyear-Zeppelin; Bell Labs; National Advisory Committee for Aeronautics
- Military career
- Allegiance: United States of America
- Branch: United States Navy
- Service years: 1904–1926, 1942–1951
- Rank: Captain
- Conflicts: World War I World War II
- Awards: Navy Cross; Distinguished Service Cross

Jerome Clarke Hunsaker (August 26, 1886 – September 10, 1984) was an American naval officer and aeronautical engineer, born in Creston, Iowa, and educated at the U.S. Naval Academy and the Massachusetts Institute of Technology. He established the first aeronautical engineering program in the US at MIT. He was instrumental in developing a weather reporting and airway navigation. Hunsaker was also pivotal in establishing the theoretical and scientific study of aerodynamics in the United States. And he was primarily responsible for the design and construction of the Navy-Curtiss airplane (NC-4) that accomplished the first transatlantic flight (May 1919), and the first successful shipboard fighter. Later he championed lighter-than-air flight but the loss of the Navy airship he designed, the USS Akron, led to the withdrawal of federal support. His WW2 chairmanship of the National Advisory Committee for Aeronautics (NACA) was notable for favouring the development of existing aircraft designs rather than experimenting with turbojets or missile technology.

== Early life ==
Jerome Hunsaker was born in Creston, Iowa, on Aug. 26,1886, the only child of Walter J. Hunsaker and Alma Lyle Clarke Hunsaker. Walter Hunsaker descended from Swiss Anabaptists who had immigrated to Philadelphia in the 1730s and moved progressively west in the eighteenth and early nineteenth centuries. Walter Hunsaker worked as a newspaper editor in Detroit, where Jerome attended public schools until 1902 when the family moved to Saginaw, Michigan, a booming industrial city on Lake Huron. Walter became editor and co-owner of the Saginaw Courier-Herald and was active in Michigan Republican Party politics. Jerome spent most of his summers at the Clarke family cottage on Lake Okoboji, a popular resort in the northwest corner of Iowa. There Jerome learned to sail and enjoyed hunting and fishing,

== Naval career ==
In 1904, in the middle of his senior year of high school in Saginaw, Jerome received an appointment to the U.S. Naval Academy in Annapolis, Maryland. After cramming for the academy's entrance exams, he was admitted as a midshipman to the class of 1908. Like his classmates, he found the academy in a state of physical and academic transition, with new accommodations in the massive Bancroft Hall and a curriculum heavy in mathematics, science, and engineering, reflecting the emergence of the burgeoning American navy of steam and steel. At Annapolis, Hunsaker excelled in academics, standing second in his class at the end of his "plebe year" in 1905. He stood first in his class at the end of his second year, dropping to second in his third year. Summer cruises in 1905 and 1906 took him and his classmates to ports in New England and the Azores. He recalled furling the sails with "fear and trembling" in the ratlines high above the deck of USS Hartford. He graduated first in his class in 1908. The school yearbook Lucky Bag noted his strong sense of humor and that he "loves an argument,”where he “generally proves he’s right."

A year of sea duty as a passed midshipman followed graduation, during which as a division officer he was instrumental in improving the gunnery of the six-inch-gun cruiser California. In 1909, Hunsaker joined the Construction Corps and was assigned to graduate studies in naval construction at MIT. The three-year program included courses in mechanics, metallurgy, electrical engineering, and ship design. During his tour, Hunsaker was elevated in 1910 to lieutenant, junior grade. He received a master of science degree in 1912, having written his thesis on the twisting moments of the rudder of a ship moving at high speeds, subsequently published in the Transactions of the Society of Naval Architects and Marine Engineers.

Hunsaker married Alice Porter Avery, an art student from Connecticut in 1911. Their first child, Sarah Porter, was born in October 1912.

== Aeronautics ==
More than any other figure in the early twentieth century, Hunsaker was responsible for establishing the theoretical and scientific study of aerodynamics in the United States. The new president of MIT, Richard C. McLaurin sought to create a modern polytechnic university, on the cutting edge of new technologies, including undergraduate and graduate courses in aeronautical engineering and funding for a state-of-the art aeronautical engineering laboratory. Attracted to the new field of study, Hunsaker translated Gustave Eiffel's Resistance of the Air and Aviation (1910).

Shortly thereafter, McLaurin invited Hunsaker to initiate an aerodynamics curriculum and related research program at MIT. Assigned to temporary duty by the Navy, Hunsaker, along with Albert F. Zahm, a pioneering aeronautical engineer, Hunsaker toured British, French, and German aerodynamic research facilities, spending time with Eiffel in his laboratory outside Paris, and working with Ludwig Prandtl at the University of Göttingen, as well as with researchers at the National Physical Laboratory at Teddington in England. He returned to MIT in late 1913 with data from European experiments and enough information to establish the aerodynamic research laboratory desired by McLaurin, located on MIT's new campus in Cambridge. When it opened in December 1914, the lab featured a wind tunnel similar to that used by the National Physical Laboratory. The following year, Hunsaker created the nation's first aeronautical engineering program at MIT. Meanwhile, he focused his own work on a theoretical study of airplane stability that earned him a doctorate in June 1916 and that was published in the Smithsonian Institution's prestigious Miscellaneous Collections and as a research report in the first annual report of the National Advisory Committee on Aeronautics (NACA).

== Later Service ==
Hunsaker returned to active duty with the Navy in 1916, reporting for duty as head of the Aircraft Division in the Bureau of Construction and Repair in Washington. His superior as bureau chief was Rear Adm. David W. Taylor, a specialist in hydrodynamics, who gave now Lieutenant Hunsaker responsibilities for aircraft design, specifications, procurement, and inspection. In his position throughout World War I, Hunsaker oversaw the introduction of new training and scouting airplanes and lighter-than-air craft, as well as such new materials as aluminum.

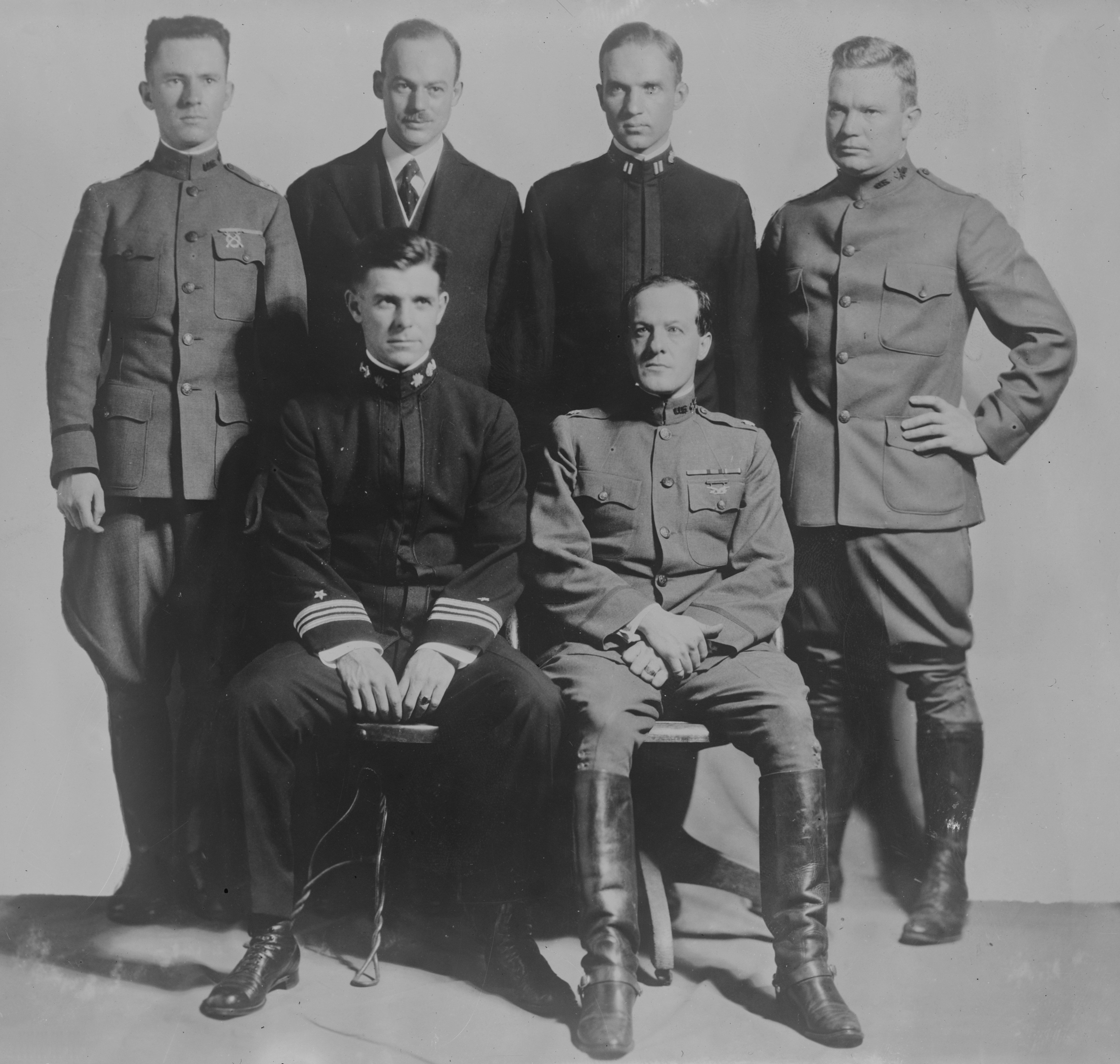
Hunsaker pictured on 17 July 1917, along with other naval pioneers (L-R; Edgar S. Gorell (1891–1945), future Chief of Staff for the Air Service; Jerome C. Hunsaker; John Henry Towers (1885–1955); Virginius E. Clark (1886–1948), an early aviator; sitting: Arthur Kennedy Atkins (1881–1964), in charge of the Division of Aeronautics (in 1920); and military aviator Benjamin Delahauf Foulois (1879–1967).

In 1917, the Navy established the Naval Aircraft Factory in Philadelphia, which manufactured large flying boats for use in antisubmarine warfare in Europe. Along with Cdr. George C. Westervelt, Hunsaker collaborated with the Curtiss Engineering Corporation in the design and construction of a four-engine flying boat capable of spanning the Atlantic. In May 1919, one of the Navy-Curtiss NC airplanes (NC-4) made the first transatlantic flight.

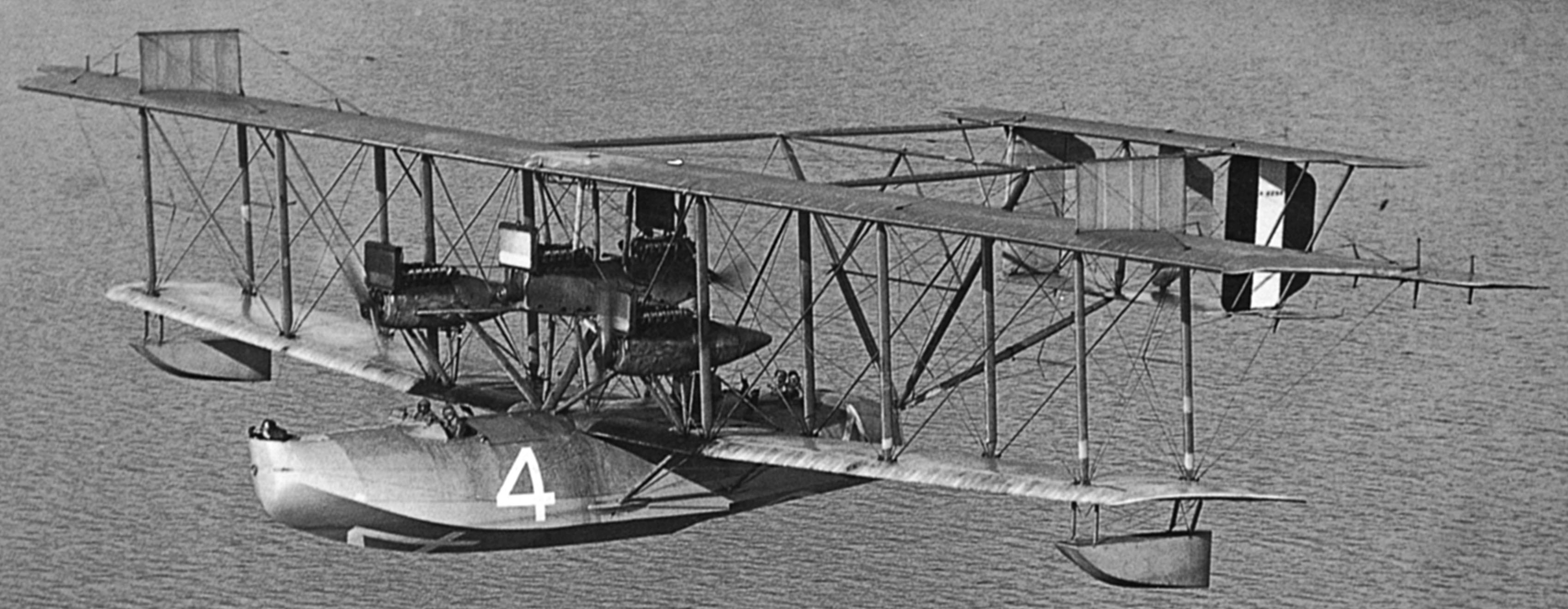
A Curtiss NC-4

Promoted to lieutenant commander in 1918, Hunsaker traveled to Europe following the Armistice in November to gather information on British, French, Italian and German wartime aeronautical developments. On his return, he recommended to the Navy's General Board that the service create a separate bureau with responsibility for aeronautics, both to keep pace with foreign developments and to preclude efforts to centralize all military and naval aviation within a united air service. The result was the establishment in 1921 of the Bureau of Aeronautics, whose first chief was Rear Adm. William A. Moffett. Within the new bureau, Hunsaker took over the Design Section within the Material Division.

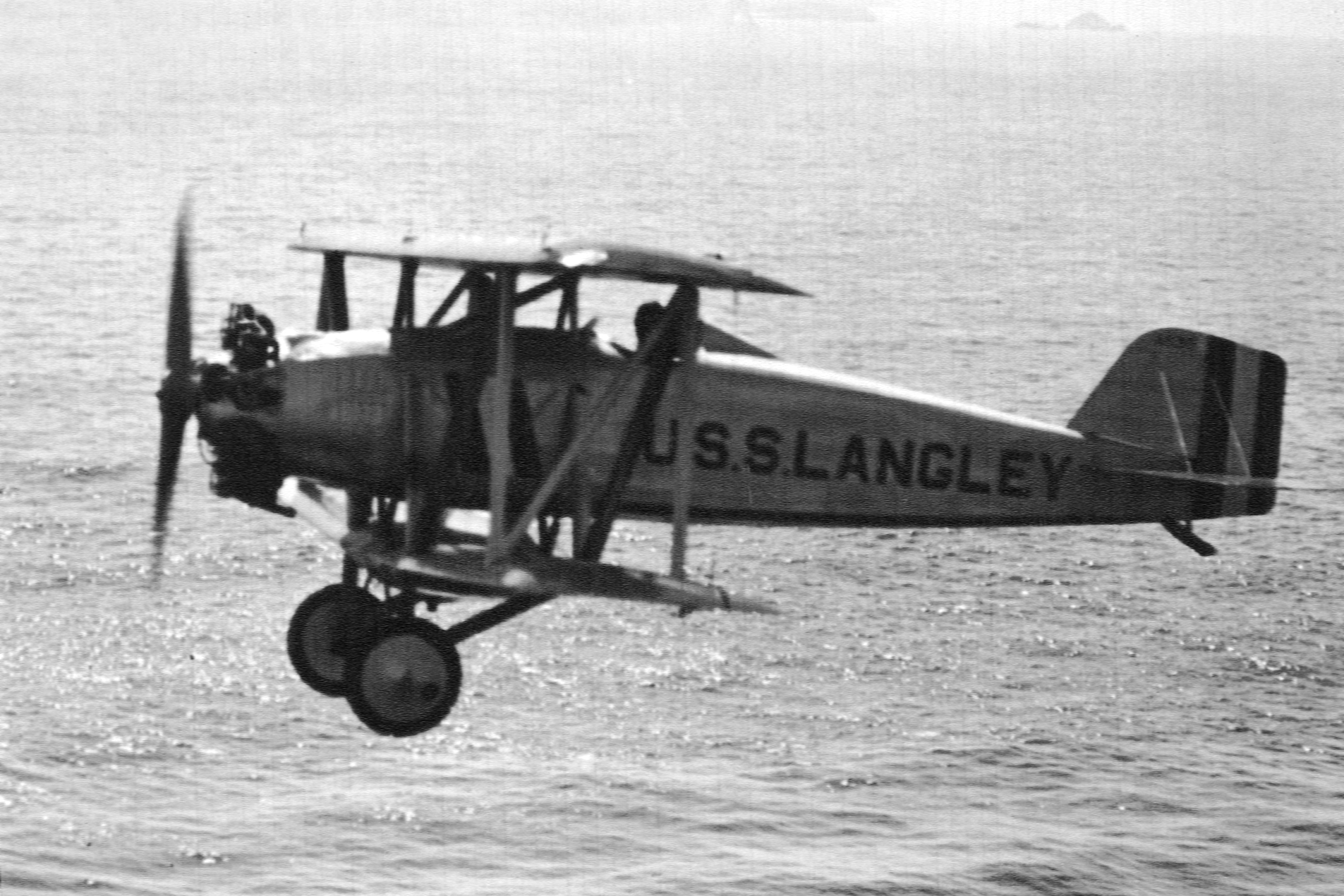
A U.S. Navy Naval Aircraft Factory/Curtiss TS-1 assigned to the aircraft carrier USS Langley (CV-1) in flight.

In his new position, and promoted to commander, Hunsaker designed the innovative TS-1 shipboard fighter and cooperated with Curtiss on high-performance racing airplanes. He also oversaw the acquisition of large rigid airships from Britain and Germany, in addition to the design and construction at the Naval Aircraft factory of the airship ZR-1, commissioned in 1923 as the Shenandoah. From 1922 to 1923, he served as the Navy's representative on the Main Committee of the NACA, beginning an association that continued on and off throughout his career. In 1923, Hunsaker left the Bureau of Aeronautics to take up an assignment as assistant naval attaché for air in the American embassy in London. He traveled widely over the next three years, studying and reporting on European aeronautical developments.

== Bell Telephone Laboratories ==
While serving in Europe, Hunsaker gauged that the “airplane and engine have reached a commercial degree of reliability, but that the technique of operation needs development.” He therefore decided to resign from the Navy and join Bell Telephone Laboratories in New York as a vice president in charge of aeronautical research. In cooperation with the Weather Bureau and the Commerce Department, Hunsaker helped develop a weather reporting and airway navigation system using AT&T's Long Lines telephone system and a radio teletype network. Western Air Express used a prototype Bell system on its Los Angeles - San Francisco passenger and mail route in 1928–1929.

== Goodyear-Zeppelin ==
Hunsaker left Bell Labs in September 1928 to become vice-president of the Goodyear-Zeppelin Corporation. Goodyear-Zeppelin was a collaboration between Goodyear Tire and Rubber and the German Luftschiffbau Zeppelin company to share rigid airship patents and technology. Hunsaker believed Goodyear-Zeppelin could succeed in making the large rigid airship, with its payload capacity and long range, the foundation of a profitable transoceanic commercial air service. But the company needed help in airship development, which came in the form of Navy contract to design and construct the Navy's fleet airships Akron and Macon, essentially commercial airship prototypes. Hunsaker was also involved in proposals for the establishment of international commercial airship lines with potential transatlantic and transpacific routes. The Daniel Guggenheim Airship Institute in Akron, Ohio, opened in 1932, was the result of Hunsaker's idea for a place where “a few advanced thinkers might be put to work with benefit to the art” of lighter-than-air technology.

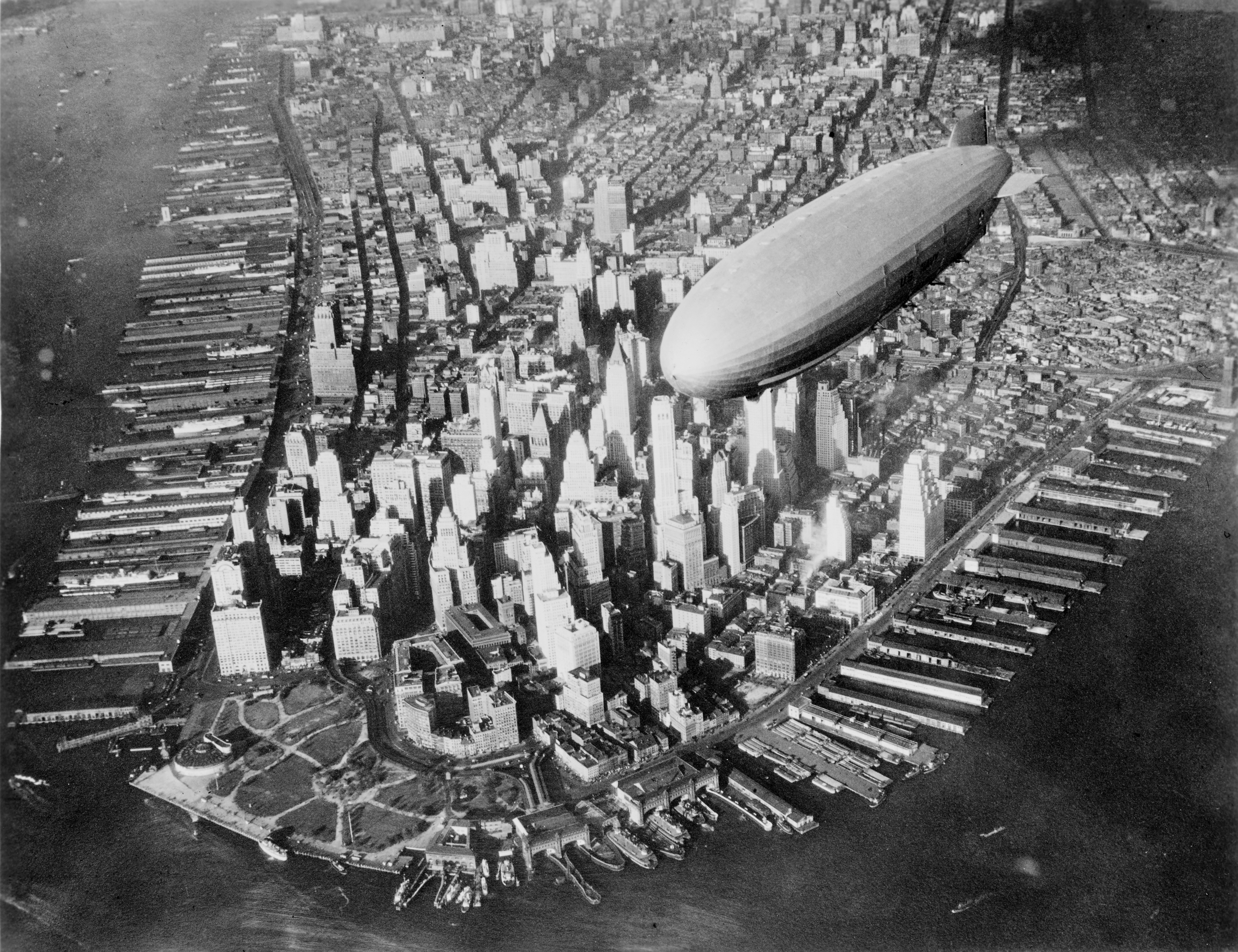
The USS Akron (ZRS-4) in flight over Manhattan, circa 1931–1933.

In the spring of 1933, as Congress weighed a major bill to subsidize international airship routes, the Akron went down in storm off the New Jersey coast, killing 74, among them BuAer Chief William Moffett. Coupled with other airship disasters, including the Shenandoah in 1925, and the British R.101 in 1930, the loss of the Akron ended the Navy's experiment with big rigid airships and doomed Goodyear-Zeppelin's commercial airship projects.

== MIT and the NACA ==
At a crossroads in his career, Hunsaker returned to MIT in 1933 as head of the Department of Mechanical Engineering. MIT's president, Karl T. Compton and Vannevar Bush, dean of engineering, admired Hunsaker for his research and administrative experience and believed he could attract young faculty with specialties in thermodynamics, hydrodynamics, and materials. Hunsaker upgraded the undergraduate and graduate curricula to stress more recent developments in aerodynamics. He was instrumental in acquiring funds for the Wright Brothers Memorial Wind Tunnel, dedicated in September 1938, and creating the new Department of Aeronautical Engineering in 1939.

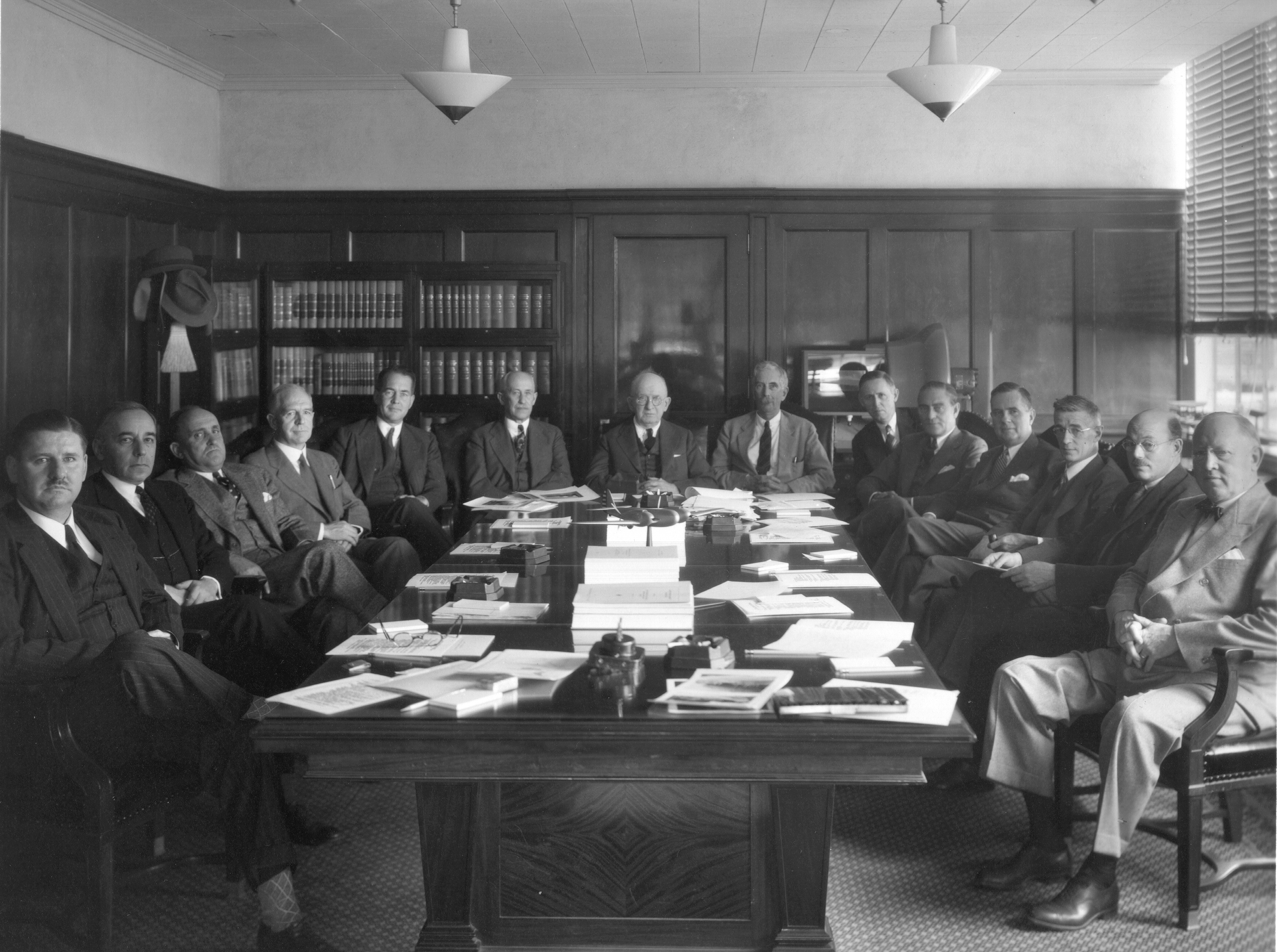
An NACA meeting on 20 October 1938; Jerome Hunsaker is shown second from right.

In 1938, Hunsaker returned to the NACA as a member of the Committee on Aerodynamics. The NACA had unusual status within the federal bureaucracy. It was independent (established 1915), functioning literally as a committee charged with identifying areas of research, setting broad policy guidelines, and acting as an intermediary between the government and private industry and universities. In 1917, the NACA established the Langley Aeronautical Laboratory in Hampton, Virginia, to carry out basic and applied research in aerodynamics. With the NACA, Hunsaker reported on the status of aerodynamics research and recommended creating a research coordinator to handle all NACA, industry, and university research. He was instrumental in site selection for a second NACA laboratory, located at Sunnyvale, California, in 1939 and a third laboratory in Cleveland in 1940. In July 1941, he succeeded Vannevar Bush as chairman of the NACA, serving in that position until 1956.

During World War II, Hunsaker and the NACA faced a dilemma: how to juggle the need for fundamental, long-range research versus the immediate wartime needs of industry and the military. Hunsaker and the NACA were criticized during and immediately after the war for the direction of NACA's research, specifically for falling behind Germany and Britain in the development of turbojet engines, for failing to comprehend the revolutionary importance of ballistic and guided missiles. Some historians, notably Alex Roland in his history of the NACA, have criticized Hunsaker for in effect abandoning basic research in favor of applied research for the benefit of the military and big business. Yet the reality is that Hunsaker remained committed to basic research and understood the need for long-term, fundamental research as essential to the strength and security of the United States. He liked the German model, where generations of students working under a gifted professor such as Ludwig Prandtl in Göttingen, had been productive in basic aerodynamic research. Nevertheless, he conceded that the immediate wartime needs of the military and industry had to be met. The NACA as a result turned to such programs as the aerodynamic clean-up of existing aircraft designs, quick fixes to improve aircraft performance, ways of extracting more power from existing engines, and in general testing and development work for industry and the military.

But he was not blind to the future, and the future was the jet. In 1947 he brought together a group of American industries who donated funds for the construction of a laboratory, the Gas Turbine Laboratory at MIT, devoted to jet propulsion. After the war, Hunsaker was the chief proponent of the “unitary” military-civilian wind tunnel program (approved by Congress in 1949), out of which came transonic and supersonic wind tunnels operated by the NACA, the Navy and the new U.S. Air Force. He successfully thwarted attempts by Congress to cut the NACA budget in fiscal years 1949-1953 and efforts to eliminate the NACA and privatize its responsibilities and assets.

Through personal contacts, Hunsaker led the NACA into cooperative arrangements with the Central Intelligence Agency (CIA). In 1956, when the CIA sought a cover story for its highaltitude U-2 reconnaissance aircraft, Hunsaker maintained that the aircraft's clandestine flights were part of NACA meteorological research. On the other hand, there is no evidence to support popular conspiracy theories that Hunsaker and others were part of a shadowy group, sometimes referred to as the Majestic 12, formed to conceal the presence of alien spacecraft or adapt alien technology to immediate military requirements.

== Awards and honors ==
Dr. Hunsaker was elected to the National Academy of Sciences (NAS) in 1935; and to the National Academy of Engineering (NAE) in 1967. With Lester Gardner he founded the American Institute of Aeronautics and Astronautics (AIAA) in 1932 (after its merger with the American Rocket Society) and became its first president (and later an Honorary Fellow). Member of the Society of Automotive Engineers, the Society of Naval Architects and the American Philosophical Society. Hon Fellow of the Royal Aeronautical Society (1920, for whom in the same year he gave an influential lecture on ‘Naval Architecture in Aeronautics’) and the Imperial College of Science and Technology of Great Britain. Hon. member of the American Society of Mechanical Engineers and the Institute of Mechanical Engineers of Great Britain.

He was awarded the Navy Cross in 1919; the Daniel Guggenheim Medal (1933, - ‘For contributions to the science of aerodynamics, to the science and art of aircraft design, and to the practical construction and utilization of rigid airships’); the Franklin Medal (1942); Presidential Medal for Merit (1946); Hon Commander of the Order of the British Empire (1948); Légion d'Honneur (1949); Wright Trophy (1951); Godfrey L. Cabot Trophy (1953); Elder Statesman of Aviation, National Aeronautic Association (1955); Smithsonian Institution's Langley Gold Medal (1955) NACA Distinguished Service Award (1957); Gold Medal of the Royal Aeronautical Society (1957); US Navy Award for Distinguished Public Service (1958); and the Julius Adams Stratton Prize (1967). In 2016 Hunsaker was posthumously inducted into the Iowa Aviation Museum Hall of Fame.

The Jerome C. Hunsaker Visiting professor of Aerospace Systems is a professorship established in 1954 by MIT’S Department of Aeronautics and Astronautics. It is named in honor of JCH's achievements in aeronautical engineering. The visiting professor is expected to deliver the Minta Martin Lecture in several venues in the United States. MIT also has a Jerome Hunsaker Professor of Aeronautics and Astronautics.

== Retirement and Later Life ==
In 1951, Hunsaker stepped down as head of MIT's Aeronautical Engineering Department and the following year discontinued his regular teaching duties. He remained active as a lecturer in the department and assisted in fund-raising activities for the institution throughout the 1950s and 1960s. In October 1956, he relinquished chairmanship of the NACA, which two years later became the core of the new National Aeronautics and Space Administration. Hunsaker's book, Aeronautics at the Mid-Century, published in 1952, surveyed advances in aerodynamics propulsion systems, and the evolution of air travel since the turn of the century. He assumed directorships and positions on consulting boards for Goodyear, Chrysler, Shell Oil, Sperry Rand, and McGraw-Hill. In retirement he traveled with his wife Alice and spent more time with his extended family, often at the family's retreat at St. Hubert's in the Adirondacks. Alice died in 1966 at the age of 79. Hunsaker lived on in declining health, but enjoying Agatha Christie novels, until his death at his home in Boston's Beacon Hill on September 10, 1984, at the age of 98. Obituaries appeared in many national newspapers, in the US and elsewhere, including The Times of London.
