= TG-4 =

TG-4 may refer to:

- Schweizer SGS 2-33, a glider used by the United States Air Force Academy, by 1962 United States Tri-Service aircraft designation
- Laister-Kauffman TG-4, a glider used by the United States Army Air Force in World War II
- Naval Aircraft Factory TG-4, a United States Navy seaplane prototype
- Olympus Tough TG-4, a weatherised digital compact camera by Olympus Corporation

== See also ==
- TG4, a public service broadcaster for Irish language speakers in Ireland and Northern Ireland
