= Naval Aircraft Factory Giant Boat =

Canceled U.S. Navy maritime patrol aircraft

Giant Boat / GB

General information
- Type: Maritime patrol aircraft
- National origin: United States
- Manufacturer: Naval Aircraft Factory
- Status: Canceled
- Primary user: United States Navy
- Number built: 0 (prototype not completed)

The Naval Aircraft Factory Giant Boat or GB was a 1919 maritime patrol aircraft project undertaken by the Naval Aircraft Factory (NAF), the in-house aircraft production arm of the United States Navy. The proposed flying boat was larger and heavier and would have possessed a longer range than any similar type then in existence, but the project was hampered by labor and funding shortages stemming from deep post-World War I U.S. military budget cuts, and in 1921, navy leaders prioritized other aircraft types and ended the project. The single incomplete prototype is believed to have been broken up after 1925.

Historian William F. Trimble describes the Giant Boat as an "aberration" that "stretched the technological capabilities of the day, especially in the areas of propulsion, aerodynamics, materials, and drag reduction." Flying boats with ranges and maximum takeoff weights exceeding the design specifications of the Giant Boat would not emerge until the mid to late 1930s.

== Development ==
By late 1918, U.S. Navy leaders were aware of the shortcomings of the existing Curtiss NC flying boat, and the Chief of Naval Operations proposed to adopt larger and more capable aircraft. In 1919, the Curtiss Aeroplane and Motor Company issued preliminary drawings for a six-engine triplane flying boat weighing 45,000 pounds (20,000 kg), but influential aeronautical engineer Jerome Clarke Hunsaker and pioneering naval aviator Holden C. Richardson decided on an even more ambitious project, drafting specifications for a flying boat with a radius of action of 1,800 miles (2,900 km) at a minimum speed of 80 miles per hour (130 km/h). A second Curtiss proposal was rejected, and with other aircraft companies expressing disinterest, the project was assigned to the NAF.

The range and speed of the preliminary design would fall slightly short of specifications; despite this, on 7 April 1920, United States Secretary of the Navy Josephus Daniels authorized construction to proceed. The NAF would build one prototype and a private contractor would then build a second Giant Boat for cost comparison. The first prototype was assigned serial number A6059. Work on the hull and wings commenced and the Gallaudet Aircraft Company was contracted to provide the engine nacelles. However, the hull was not substantially completed until late 1921 due to shortages of drafters, and wing construction reached an impasse: the original design was already obsolete due to advances in fabrication techniques, and engineers proposed an extensive redesign.

By this time, budget cuts had already forced the cancellation of the second prototype, and it was estimated that completion of the first prototype would cost at least $200,000. Rear Admiral David W. Taylor decreed that obtaining an adequate number of shipborne observation and fighter aircraft was a higher priority than completing the large patrol aircraft, and Captain William A. Moffett ordered work to end upon completion of the hull and delivery of the remaining engine nacelles. The fate of the incomplete prototype is not well documented, but it is believed that all work had ceased by early 1922, and that the NAF disposed of the completed aircraft components after 1925.

== Design ==
Richardson initially called for a conservative design approach and an aircraft that was no larger than necessary; however, the aircraft's proposed maximum takeoff weight of 70,000 pounds (32,000 kg) was exceptionally large by the standards of the time, far exceeding the Curtiss NC and the company's 1919 proposal. The fuselage was of conventional wooden construction, while the wings were to use high-strength steel spars and duralumin ribs, a novel innovation at the time. To allow engines to be disengaged and serviced in flight, project engineers proposed using multiple engines to drive common propellers via driveshafts and couplings, an arrangement that has proven generally impractical and unsuccessful even decades afterwards. The aircraft would have a triplane configuration, with nine 400 horsepower (300 kW) Liberty V-1649 engines housed in three triple-engine nacelles mounted on the middle wing, driving huge 18 feet (5.5 m) tractor propellers. The nacelles were designed by the Gallaudet Aircraft Company and were called the Gallaudet Multiple Drive; when tested it was claimed to have "worked out to our complete satisfaction".

== Specifications ==
Data from Wings for the Navy

General characteristics

- Crew: 5
- Length: 65 ft (20 m) approximate, fuselage only. Flight gives an overall length of 90 ft (27 m) and the hull length as 67 ft (20 m).
- Upper wingspan: 150 ft (46 m)
- Mid wingspan: 150 ft (46 m)
- Lower wingspan: 121 ft (37 m)
- Height: 48 ft (15 m)
- Wing area: 5,894 sq ft (547.6 m^{2})
- Max takeoff weight: 70,000 lb (31,751 kg)
- Powerplant: 9 × Liberty V-1649 water-cooled 45° V-12 piston engine, 400 hp (300 kW) each mounted in triple nacelles
- Propellers: 18 ft (5.5 m) diameter

Performance

- Maximum speed: 102 mph (164 km/h, 89 kn)
- Cruise speed: 78 mph (126 km/h, 68 kn)
- Range: 1,630 mi (2,620 km, 1,420 nmi)

Armament

- Guns: 5 x .50 in (12.7 mm) machine guns
- Bombs: 6 x 1,000 pounds (450 kg)

== Bibliography ==
- Trimble, William F. (1990). Wings for the Navy: A History of the Naval Aircraft Factory, 1917-1956 (1st ed.). Annapolis, Maryland: Naval Institute Press. ISBN 0-87021-663-5.
