= Naval Aircraft Factory TF =

TF

General information
- Type: Flying boat escort fighter
- National origin: United States
- Manufacturer: Naval Aircraft Factory
- Status: Canceled 11 January 1923
- Number built: 4

History
- First flight: 13 October 1920

The Naval Aircraft Factory TF (Tandem Fighter) was an American twin-engine flying-boat escort fighter first flown in October 1920. The aircraft originated from requirements drafted by the British Technical Committee in April 1918, after discussion approved the development of a long-range seaborne fighter capable of escorting Allied maritime reconnaissance sorties over the North Sea and Atlantic regions.

== Development ==
Following the armistice, the incentives to produce a fighter eventually deviated toward evaluating the prospective applications of a highly unique concept. Upon review of numerous proposals, the Aeronautics Division of the U.S. Bureau of Engineering referred recommendations to the Chief of Naval Operations in which to finalize approval of a submission by the Naval Aircraft Factory (NAF) with which to produce a pre-production series of four prototypes at an estimated construction cost of $84,680.

Accordingly, the NAF proposal consisted of a twin-engine flying boat which featured a hull design identical to that of the Curtiss NC-1, an armament of four flexible mounting Lewis machine guns, and four crew members. An egg-like nacelle atop the upper wing housed an additional pilot/gunner's position. Initially designated as Twin Fighter (TF), a review of the aircraft's dimensions showed that the wingspan was insufficient for a conventional two-engine layout. Thus, the Bureau of Engineering revised the engine configuration into a tractor/pusher combination mounted on the aircraft centerline. This change altered the designation from Twin to Tandem fighter. The TF was designed to incorporate two Curtiss-built 400 hp (300 kW) Kirkham inline engines, however mechanical problems hindered the development of these power plants, so two 300 hp (220 kW) Hispano Suiza engines were adopted instead.

== Operational history ==
=== Flight testing ===
Construction of the four prototypes (serial numbers A-5576, A-5577, A-5578, and A-5579) began in August 1919. The first TF was completed on October 1, 1920, with the first flight taking place 12 days later. However, high throttle settings caused the engines to overheat, thus obliging the pilot to undertake an emergency landing at the mouth of the Delaware River. After a brief waiting period to allow the engines to cool, the aircraft was damaged upon collision with an ocean liner's wake during another takeoff attempt. Other problems noted during initial testing were stiff and erratic rudder control while the ailerons exhibited a tendency to roll in directions opposite to that of rudder control. While subsequent modifications to the tail section remedied the stability problems, the propensity of the engines to overheat at high RPM settings remained an ongoing hindrance to the testing procedure, not only causing several premature landings, but ultimately providing the most decisive factor in the TF's subsequent cancellation.

=== Cancellation ===
In June 1921, the Trial Board appealed to the U.S. Navy Department for immediate termination of the project, arguing that:

The power plant defects in this plane can be overcome, but not those pertaining to its air worthiness and sea worthiness, unless the plane is largely redesigned. In view of the numerous defects in this plane, and its questionable utility, even though these defects were remedied, it is recommended that further experimental work on this plane be discontinued.

The Navy Department dismissed the recommendations as premature, arguing that plans to retrofit the second and third prototypes with enlarged radiators in conjunction with alternate engine types might elicit a more successful outcome. However, the specialized radiators failed to arrive for several months, thereby postponing the completion of both types to the midpoint of 1922. Furthermore, the test flight of the third prototype (A-5578) in July ended in another mechanical failure which destroyed the primary water tank, the resulting fragments of which in turn damaged the hull section and shattered the forward propeller. With little hope for any significant improvements in the allotted evaluation phase, the Trial Board issued another plea to the Navy Department on December 29, to which the latter immediately complied, issuing its formal cancellation of the TF project on January 11, 1923.

== Specifications (A-5576) ==
Sideview of TF. Note the inclusion of the upper-wing nacelle

General characteristics

- Crew: 4
- Length: 44 ft 0 in (13 m)
- Wingspan: 60 ft 0 in (18 m)
- Height: 15 ft 0 in (4.6 m)
- Wing area: 930 sq ft (86 m^{2})
- Empty weight: 5,575 lb (2,529 kg)
- Gross weight: 8,846 lb (4,012 kg)Fuel capacity: 2,051 lb (930 kg)
- Powerplant: 2 × Hispano-Suiza "Model H" in-line engines, mounted in tandem, 300 hp (220 kW) each

Performance

- Maximum speed: 95 mph (153 km/h, 82.5 kn) (original estimates indicated 106.5 mph (171.4 km/h; 92.5 kn))
- Cruise speed: 72 mph (116 km/h, 62.5 kn)
- Range: 639 mi (1,028 km, 555 nmi) max speed, 650 mi (1,050 km) cruising speed
- Service ceiling: 13,000 ft (4,000 m)
- Landing speed: 55 mph (89 km/h)
- Endurance (max. speed): 6.0 hrs.
- Endurance (cruising speed): 9.0+ hrs

Armament

- 3 × .30 in (7.62 mm) Lewis machine guns

== Summary of Flight Trials (A-5576) - Oct. 1920 - Mar. 1921 ==
No.	Date	Type	Duration	Crew (pilot, observer)	Notes
1	10/13/20	Generic Flight Trial	30 min.	Comm. Richardson, Lt. Fleming	N/A
2	10/13/20	Speed Run	20 min.	Comm. Richardson, Lt. Fleming	N/A
3	10/13/20	Speed Run	45 min.	Lt. Fleming, Lt. Fellers	Engines overheated
4	10/13/20	Speed Run	0 min.	Lt. Fellers, Lt. Fleming	Both bottom wings and pontoons destroyed on take-off
5	10/21/20	Speed Run	1 hr. 5 min.	Comm. Richardson, Lt. Fleming	Engine head cowl installed
6	10/22/20	Speed Run	20 min.	Comm. Richardson, Lt. Fleming	Engine head cowl removed
7	11/15/20	Fully Loaded Test	15 min.	Lt. Fleming, Lt. Fellers	Slightly nose heavy at high speed
8	11/18/20	Speed Run	35 min.	Lt. Fleming, Mach. West	N/A
9	1/19/21	Evaluation of New Tail Section	10 min.	Comm. Richardson, Lt. Fleming	Improved stability and control characteristics
10	2/4/21	Propeller Test	15 min.	Lt. Fleming, Mach. West	N/A
11	2/4/21	Propeller Test	20 min.	Lt. Fleming, Mach. West	N/A
12	2/7/21	Propeller Test	5 min.	Lt. Fleming, Mach. West	Spinner on rear engine shattered, damaging port beam of tail.
13	2/25/21	Propeller Test	20 min.	Lt. Fleming, Mach. West	N/A
14	3/1/21	Propeller Test	10 min.	Lt. Fleming, Mach. West	N/A
15	3/2/21	Propeller Test	20 min.	Lt. Fleming, Mach. West	N/A
16	3/5/21	Propeller Test	25 min.	Cdr. Richardson, Lt. MacKenna	N/A
N/A	3/5/21	N/A	0 min.	N/A	Gasoline line to forward engine ruptured

== RPM/Speed Readings Obtained During Flight Trials on Oct. 13, 1920 (A-5576) ==
RPM (Tractor Engine)	RPM (Pusher Engine)	Air Speed (knots)
1350	1300	58
1250	1260	53
1100	1100	43
1490	1490	69
1200	1110	46
1500	1490	70
