= Rex Beisel =

American aeronautical engineer

Rex Buren Beisel, aeronautical engineer, c. 1950

Rex Buren Beisel (October 24, 1893 – January 26, 1972) was an American aeronautical engineer and pioneer in the science and industry of aviation. He was the lead designer of several successful military and civilian aircraft, but is best known for designing the World War II-era Vought F4U Corsair fighter plane.

== Life and career ==
Beisel was born on October 24, 1893, in San Jose, California, and was raised in Cumberland, Washington, a small mining community in the foothills of the Cascade Mountains. His father worked as a coal miner. The family lived for a time in a tent, then a small wooden house for which Rex, in an early display of his flair for design, built a picket fence.

As a teenager, Beisel worked variously as a carpenter, store clerk, and surveyor's helper. He attended Queen Anne High School in Seattle, and worked summers at the coal mine in Cumberland as a breaker boy, mule driver, coal washer, and driver of the gas-powered locomotive which carried coal out of the mine.

In 1912 he enrolled in the University of Washington, where he earned a Bachelor of Science degree, while continuing to work at the coal mine and in various other jobs. On graduating he took a civil service examination in mechanical engineering and passed with such high marks that he was immediately offered a job in the U.S. Navy's Bureau of Construction and Repair; this soon led to a job at the newly formed Bureau of Aeronautics.

Starting out as a draftsman in 1917 at $4 a day, Beisel became fascinated with aviation. With no previous aeronautic experience and little available in the way of textbooks or data, he began designing hulls, wing floats, and pontoons for seaplanes, and proved so adept at it that he soon received promotions and assignment to major projects. In November 1919 he became one of a small number of certified aeronautical engineers in the United States.

In 1921, while working at the Bureau of Aeronautics, Beisel designed the TS-1, the first U.S. Navy fighter actually built to naval specifications.

In 1923 the Curtiss Aeroplane and Motor Company lured Beisel into the private sector, making the 29-year-old their Chief Engineer. Two years later, planes of his design won both first and second place in the prestigious Pulitzer Trophy air races. While at Curtiss he also designed the N2C-1 Fledgling, which became the main training aircraft of the Naval Reserve, and the F8C Helldiver, one of the world's earliest purpose-built dive bombers.

After a short stint at Spartan Aircraft, Beisel became Assistant Chief Engineer at Chance Vought in 1931. He was the lead designer for the innovative SBU-1 and SB2U Vindicator scout/bombers, and in 1934 received the Manley Memorial Medal (SAE) and the Wright Brothers Medal for Cowling and Cooling of Radial Air-Cooled Aircraft Engines, a technical paper he co-authored.

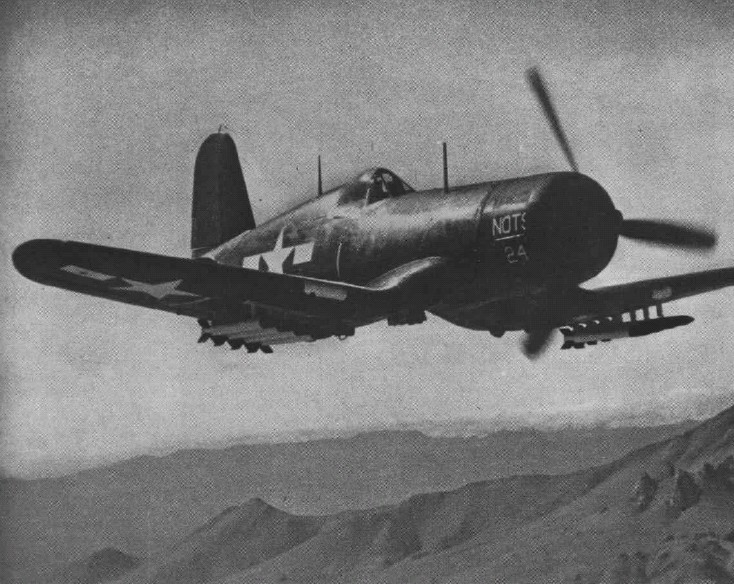
A Vought F4U-1D Corsair assigned to the Naval Ordnance Test Station (NOTS), China Lake, California (US), in 1945

Promoted to Chief Engineer at Vought, Beisel headed up the design team that produced the F4U Corsair, the first fighter aircraft to exceed a speed of 400 mph in level flight with a full military load. Beisel’s ingenious design combined the most powerful engine available with the largest diameter propeller ever built. The Corsair became one of the most famous fighters of the Second World War and played an important role in establishing Allied dominance of the air in the Pacific.

Beisel also served as lead designer for the Vought F7U Cutlass, the company's first carrier jet fighter in operational service (the earlier F6U Pirate seeing use only in testing and training roles). Though having several advanced features, it, like many early jets, was underpowered and unreliable. Its tall front landing strut and problems with the ejection seat made it particularly dangerous for pilots, and by 1956, after a series of accidents, it had been withdrawn from service by the Navy.

In 1943 Beisel had become General Manager of Vought Aircraft, a position he held until 1949. In this position he oversaw, in 1948–49, the company's move from Stratford, Connecticut to Dallas, Texas. With 27,000,000 pounds of equipment and 1,300 employees and their families to be moved, it was among the largest industrial relocations on record. He was named Vice President of United Aircraft Corporation (Vought's parent company) in 1949, and retired a few years later.

Beisel died at his home in Sarasota, Florida on January 26, 1972, at age 78. He was survived by his wife Eunice and their four children: Rex Buren, Ann Marie MacNaughton, Susan Lee, and David Doran.

== Sources ==
- Vought Bio
- F4U Corsair
