= Naval Aircraft Factory =

Former aircraft building site in Philadelphia, USA

Coordinates: 39°53.501′0″N 75°10.232′0″W

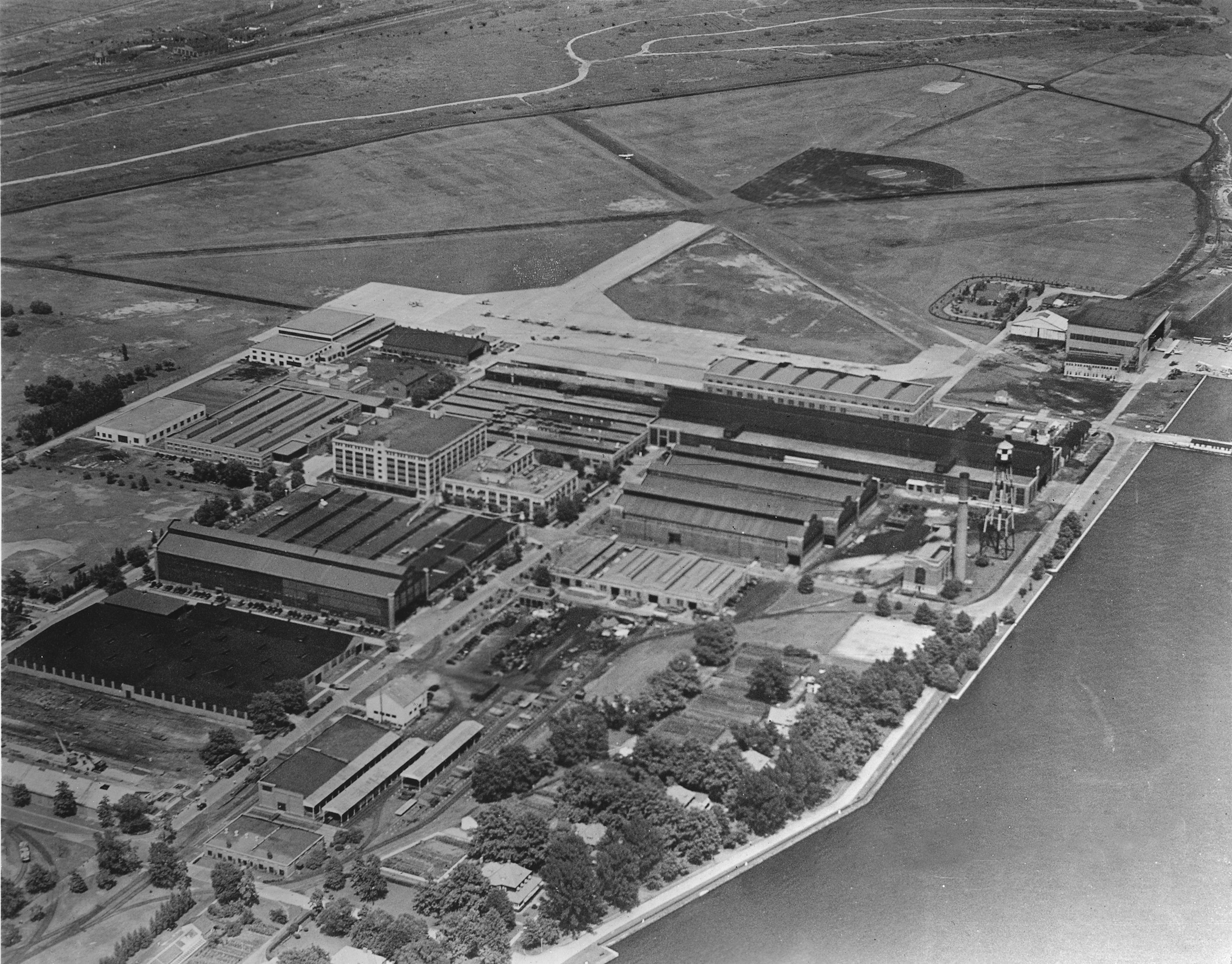
- Aerial view of the NAF

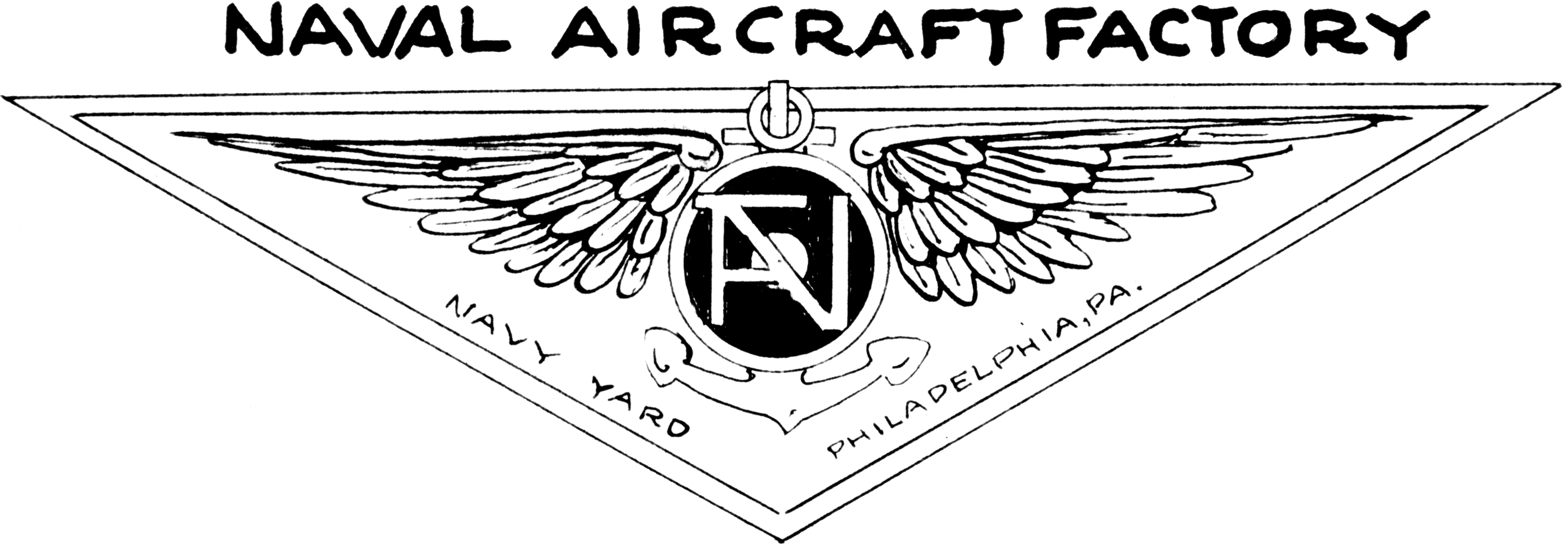
- Insignia of the NAF

Site history
- Built: 1917
- In use: 1917–1945
- Battles/wars: World War I World War II

The Naval Aircraft Factory (NAF) was established by the United States Navy in 1918 in Philadelphia, Pennsylvania. It was created to help solve aircraft supply issues which the Navy Department faced upon the entry of the U.S. into World War I. The United States Army’s requirements for an enormous quantity of airplanes created a decided lack of interest among aircraft manufacturers in the Navy's requirements for a comparatively small quantity of aircraft. The Navy Department concluded that it was necessary to build a Navy-owned aircraft factory in order to assure a part of its aircraft supply; to obtain cost data for the department’s guidance in its dealings with private manufacturers; and to have under its own control a factory capable of producing experimental designs.

== History ==
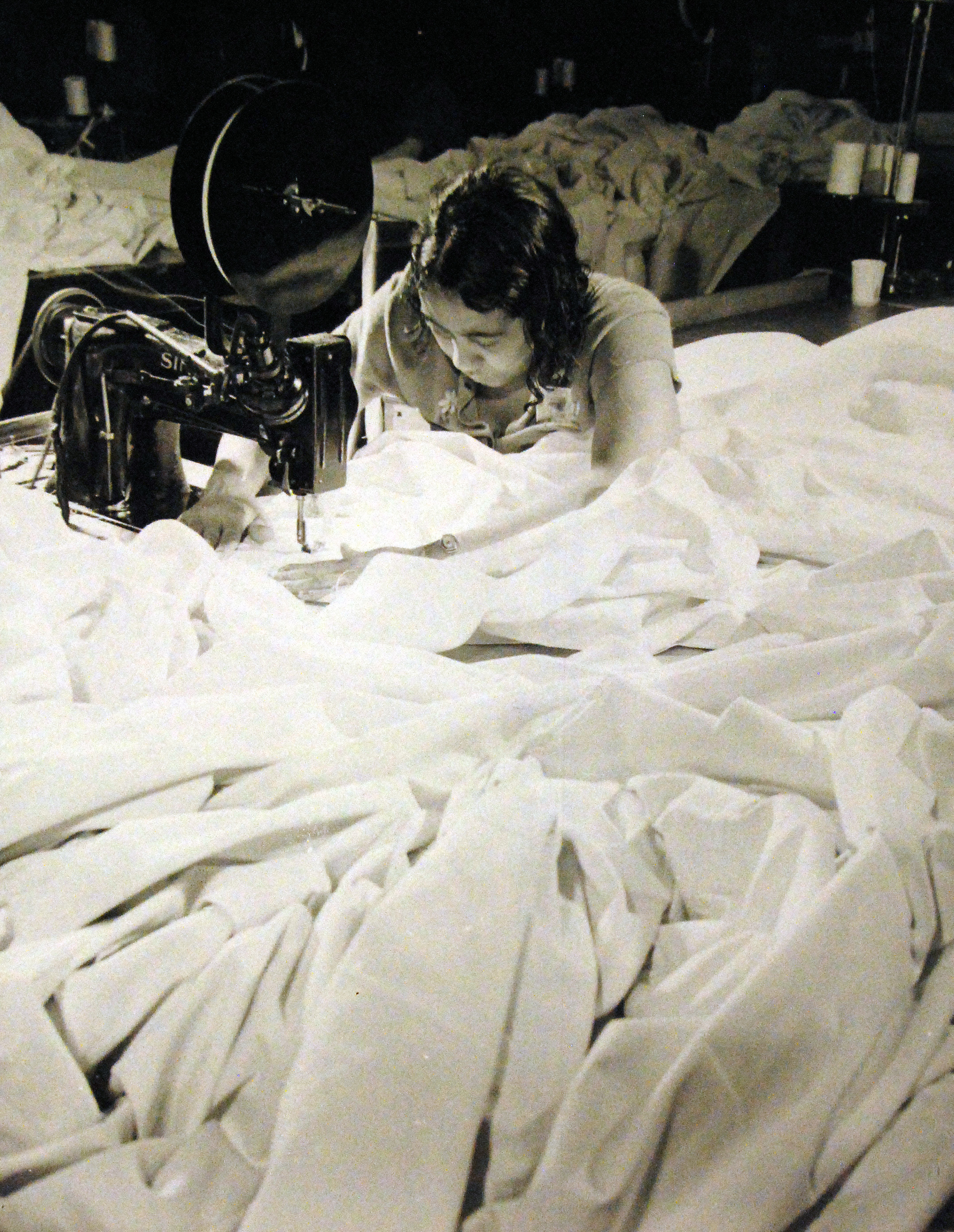
Woman making parachute at NAF, May 1942

=== World War I ===
On 27 July 1917 Secretary of the Navy Josephus Daniels approved the construction of the Naval Aircraft Factory as a means for the government to promote industry efficiency, ensure engineering expertise, and to monitor costs. The contract was let on 6 August 1917, and ground was broken four days later. The main assembly building, Number 59, was completed by 28 November 1917. Work started on the first order, received 8 days before, for the construction of 50 H-16 patrol aircraft. By the end of the year, the work force numbered more than 700, under the management of Lieutenant Commander Fred G. Coburn.

An additional order for 100 H-16s was placed in February 1918. The increased need for flying boat construction during WWI meant expanding the factory into a final aircraft assembly plant, using civilian subcontractors to supply the components. Building 77, the main assembly building, was completed in August, measuring 100 feet wide, 680 feet long, and 51 feet in height. Building 75, a three-story office building, and Building 76, a six-story storehouse were added so that the NAF occupied 41 acres by September 1918. By the end of 1918, the NAF employed 3,640 workers, including 890 women.

On 27 March 1918, the first H-16 built by the NAF was successfully flown, just 228 days after ground breaking and 151 days from receipt of drawings. On 2 April the first two NAF-built H-16s were shipped to the patrol station at RNAS Killingholme, England. After World War I, when the 1922 United States Navy aircraft designation system came into effect, the second letter of the codes designating the manufacturer appropriately specified the letter N for all airframe designs coming from the Naval Aircraft Factory.

Between July 1917 and November 1918, the end of WWI, the NAF built 137 H-16s, 31 F-5-Ls, 4 N-1 Davis Gun Carriers, 17 sets of spares for the H-16 and 8 sets of spares for the F-5-L. In 1919, construction started on 80 MFs and 20 VE-7s. In 1920, construction began on 36 of Grover Loening's M-81s, 6 Navy-Curtiss flying boats, and 4 TFs. In 1921, construction began on 15 PT-1s and 18 PT-2s.

In 1922, full-scale production of outside designs ended, and the NAF began concentrating on the testing and evaluation of aircraft, including both the modification to outside types and all-new in-house designs. Successful designs were then turned over to industry for production. The change in focus resulted in the disuse of some production buildings, which were converted into storage depots for unused aircraft. In 1922-1923, the NAF fabricated the USS Shenandoah (ZR-1), although final assembly took place at Naval Air Station Lakehurst, New Jersey, where the only hangar in the United States large enough to house the airship was located.

=== World War II ===
The NAF was a major parachute production center in the 1930s and 1940s, producing 30,000 in WWII. The NAF also worked on aircraft catapults and arresting gear starting in 1921.

In the 1934 under the Vinson-Trammell Act (co-sponsored by Carl Vinson), it was decided that the Navy would build 10% of its own aircraft to stay abreast of modern manufacturing techniques and costs. The NAF thus resumed large-scale aircraft production in 1936 on introduction of the N3N biplane trainer aircraft. In 1937, the NAF received orders to manufacture 44 SON-1 scout observation aircraft, and in 1938, 30 SBN-1s. In July 1941, the NAF was ordered to build 156 PBN-1 Nomad patrol flying boats. In 1942, the NAF delivered the first of eventually 300 OS2N-1s.

In 1941 the NAF spun off the Aviation Supply Office, and in 1942 the NAF became the Naval Air Material Center. On 11 March 1942 Admiral Harold Rainsford Stark wrote "It is desired to proceed immediately with the steps necessary to adapt the 'drone' for warfare." Then, on 3 April 1942, an order was placed for the NAF to build 100 TDN-1s. In 1943, work began on Project Gorgon, a turbo-jet-powered missile.

The NAF ended aircraft production with the end of World War II in 1945. Peak factory employment of 13,400 workers was achieved in June 1943, during WWII. In 1967, the NAF's aero engine research merged with the Naval Air Propulsion Test Center. Located at the Philadelphia Naval Shipyard, on League Island, the main construction building still exists but was converted for use by the Naval Surface Warfare Center Carderock Division as a facility for research and development.

== Products ==
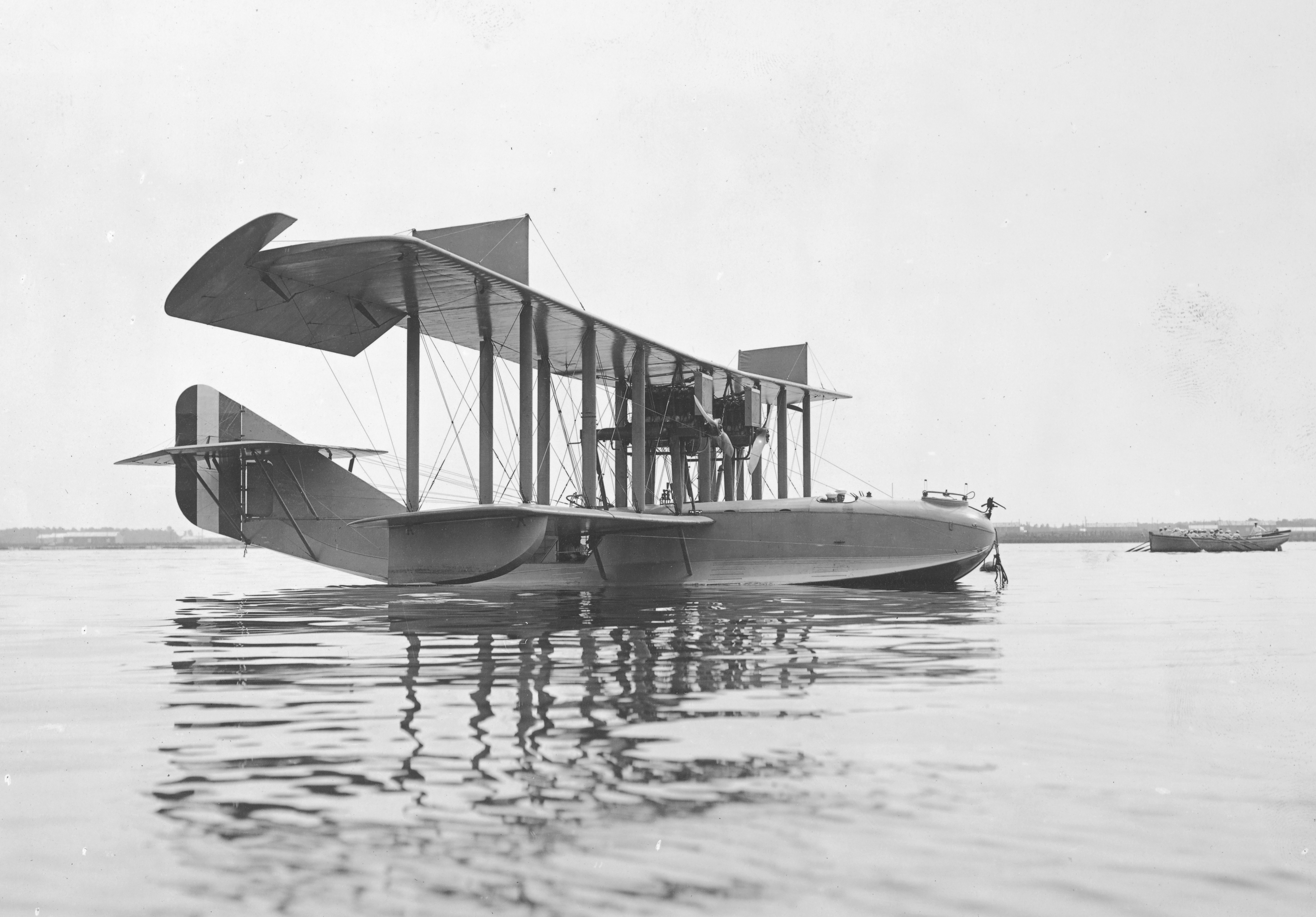
The first F5L built by the Naval Aircraft Factory, July 1918

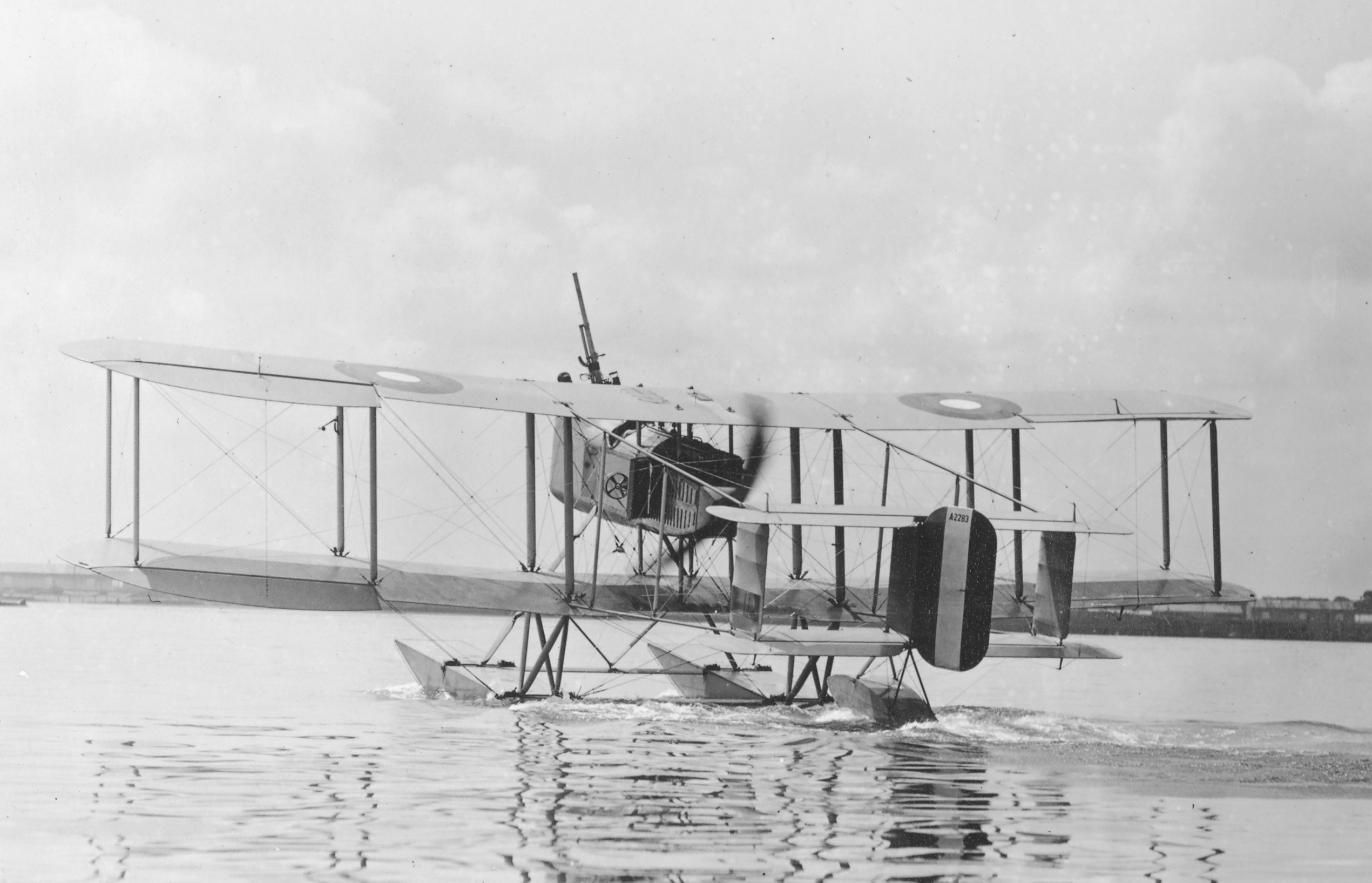
N-1 serial A2283

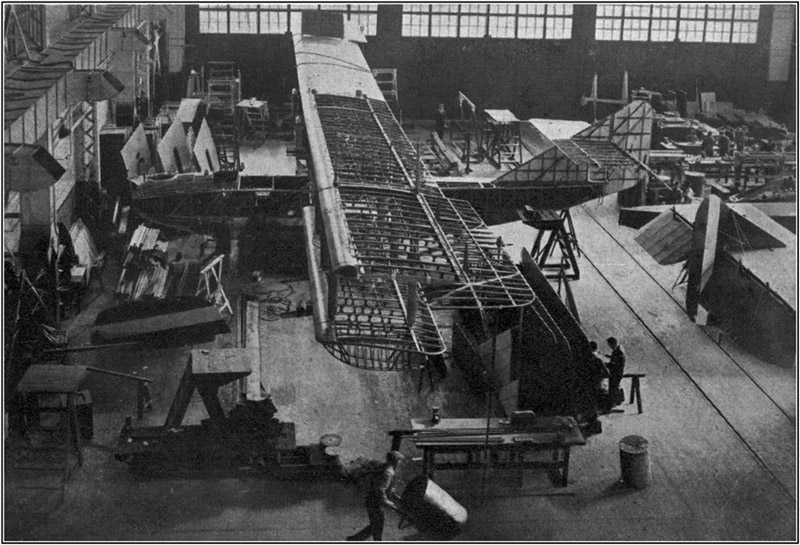
F5L under construction at the Naval Aircraft Factory, c.1920

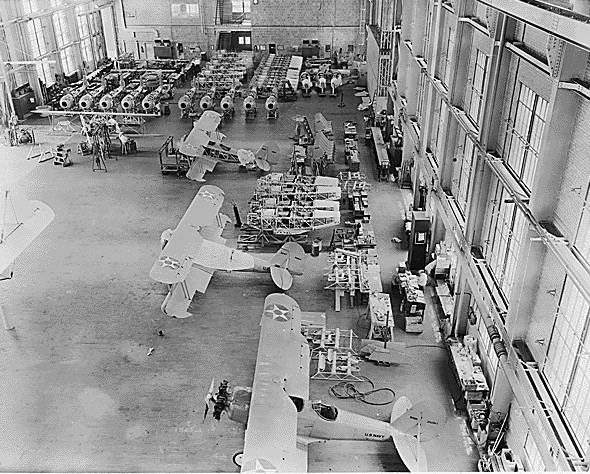
N3N production in 1937

- BN & BS - cancelled projects
- CS-3 - biplane torpedo bomber, variant of the Curtiss CS-2
- Felixstowe F5L - patrol flying boat, variant of the Felixstowe F.5 produced by NAF
- FN - cancelled fighter project, possibly a proposed further development of the Seversky NF-1, but evidence of this is inconclusive and may stem from typos in Navy records (Note: Under the 1922 United States Navy aircraft designation system, the designation of the initial production version of the NAF fighter would have been FN-1, which is very similar to NF-1.)
- GB - Giant Boat, prototype heavy flying boat, never completed
- MF - utility flying boat, variant of the Curtiss MF produced by NAF
- N-1 - pusher floatplane gunship
- N2N - biplane trainer
- N3N Canary - biplane trainer
- NM - Navy Metal, experimental biplane built to test metal structure techniques
- NO - observation floatplane, also built by Martin as M2O
- OS2N Kingfisher - observation floatplane, variant of the Vought OS2U Kingfisher produced by NAF
- PBN Nomad - patrol flying boat, variant of the Consolidated PBY Catalina produced by NAF
- PN - patrol flying boat derived from the Felixstowe F5L
- PT - torpedo bomber floatplane built by NAF from Curtiss R-6L and Curtiss HS2L parts
- SA - Ship's Airplane, prototype ultralight aircraft intended for basing on battleships
- SBN - carrier-based scout bomber, Brewster XSBA-1 produced by NAF under license
- SON Seagull - observation floatplane, variant of the Curtiss SOC Seagull produced by NAF
- SP - racing monoplane built for Schneider Trophy, known as Mercury Racer
- TDN - early unmanned combat aerial vehicle
- TD2N, later KDN Gorgon - jet-powered target drone
- TD3N, later KD2N Gorgon II - jet-powered target drone
- TF - twin-engine flying boat prototype intended for use as escort fighter
- TG - biplane floatplane designed for gunnery training
- TR - racing variant of the NAF TS-2
- TS - biplane fighter
- VE-7 - biplane fighter and trainer aircraft, Vought VE-7 produced by NAF
- XN5N - monoplane trainer prototype
- XOSN - observation floatplane prototype
- XP2N and XP4N - initial and final designations given to the PN-11 prototype, an improved variant of the PN patrol flying boat
- XTN - twin-engine torpedo bomber prototype, later put into production by Douglas as T2D and P2D
- XT2N - carrier-based biplane torpedo bomber prototype
- USS Shenandoah (ZR-1) - rigid airship (fabrication of parts for off-site final assembly)

== Notable personnel ==
- Isaac Asimov
- L. Sprague de Camp
- Robert A. Heinlein
- Alden Sanborn
- George Conrad Westervelt

== See also ==
- Henry C. Mustin Naval Air Facility
