= Naval Aircraft Factory TG =

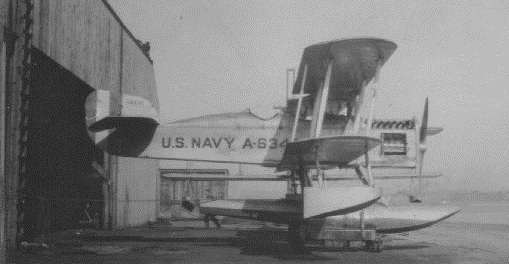

General information
- Type: Seaplane gunnery trainer
- National origin: United States
- Manufacturer: Naval Aircraft Factory
- Primary user: United States Navy
- Number built: 5

History
- First flight: 1922

The Naval Aircraft Factory TG were a series of prototype seaplanes for gunnery training designed and built by the United States Navy's Naval Aircraft Factory.

== Development ==
The TG was an equal-span biplane with tandem open cockpits. It had a large central float with a smaller stabilizing float underneath each wingtip. Five were built for evaluation designated TG-1, TG-2, TG-3, TG-4 and TG-5 and were generally similar. The TG-1, TG-3 and TG-4 had internal fuselage fuel tanks and the TG-2 and TG-5 had fuel tanks inside the central float.

== Variants ==
TG-1
Powered by a 200hp (149kW) Liberty engine, one built.
TG-2
Powered by a 200hp (149kW) Liberty engine, one built.
TG-3
Powered by a 200hp (149kW) Aeromarine T-6 engine, one built.
TG-4
Powered by a 200hp (149kW) Aeromarine T-6 engine, one built.
TG-5
Powered by a 180hp (134kW) Wright-Hispano E-4 engine, one built.

== Operator ==
United States

- United States Navy

== Specifications (TG-2) ==
General characteristics

- Crew: 2 (pilot and trainee)
- Length: 30 ft 0 in (9.14 m)
- Wingspan: 36 ft 0 in (10.97 m)
- Wing area: 339.9 sq ft (31.58 m^{2})
- Empty weight: 2,401 lb (1,089 kg)
- Gross weight: 2,996 lb (1,359 kg)
- Powerplant: 1 × Liberty piston engine , 200 hp (149 kW)

Performance

- Maximum speed: 97 mph (156 km/h, 84 kn)
- Cruise speed: 78 mph (125 km/h, 67 kn)
- Service ceiling: 13,000 ft (4,000 m)

Armament

- 1x7.62mm MG

== See also ==
Related lists

- List of military aircraft of the United States (Naval)
- List of flying boats and floatplanes
