= Douglas T2D =

1927 American torpedo bomber

T2D
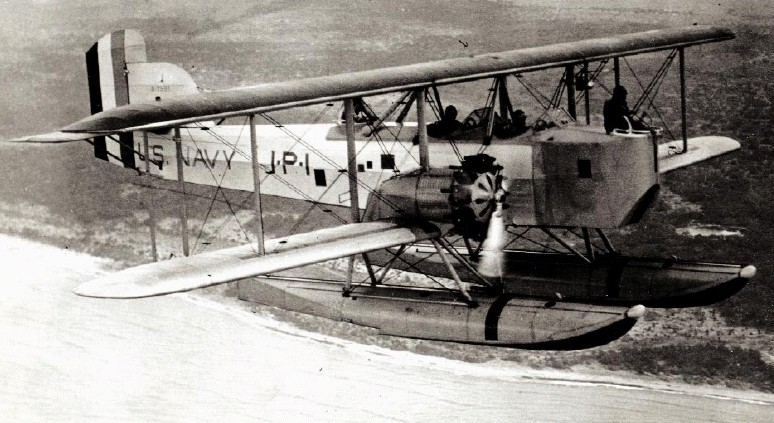
- Douglas T2D-1 of VP-1

General information
- Type: Torpedo bomber
- Manufacturer: Douglas Aircraft Company
- Primary user: United States Navy
- Number built: 31

History
- Introduction date: 1927
- First flight: 27 January 1927
- Retired: 1937

The Douglas T2D was an American twin-engined torpedo bomber contracted by the military, and required to be usable on wheels or floats, and operating from aircraft carriers. It was the first twin-engined aircraft to be operated from an aircraft carrier.

== Development and design ==
In 1925, the United States Navy's Bureau of Aeronautics designed a twin-engined torpedo bomber aircraft, intended to have greater performance than contemporary single-engined aircraft. A single prototype was built by the Naval Aircraft Factory as the XTN-1, which was quickly followed by three identical aircraft built by Douglas, the T2D-1.

The XTN/T2D was a large two bay biplane, capable of easy conversion between floats and wheels, and carrying a crew of four.

== Operational history ==
The first three T2D-1's were delivered to the torpedo bomber squadron VT-2 on 25 May 1927, being used for successful trials aboard the aircraft carrier Langley. A further nine T2D-1's were ordered in 1927, these normally being operated as floatplanes, partly owing to criticism from the Army of the Navy operating large land-based bombers, and partly as its large size prevented Langley from embarking a full airwing.

A further 18 aircraft were ordered in June 1930 as patrol floatplanes, being designated P2D-1. These were operated by Patrol Squadron VP-3 in the Panama Canal Zone until they were replaced by Consolidated PBYs in 1937.

== Variants ==
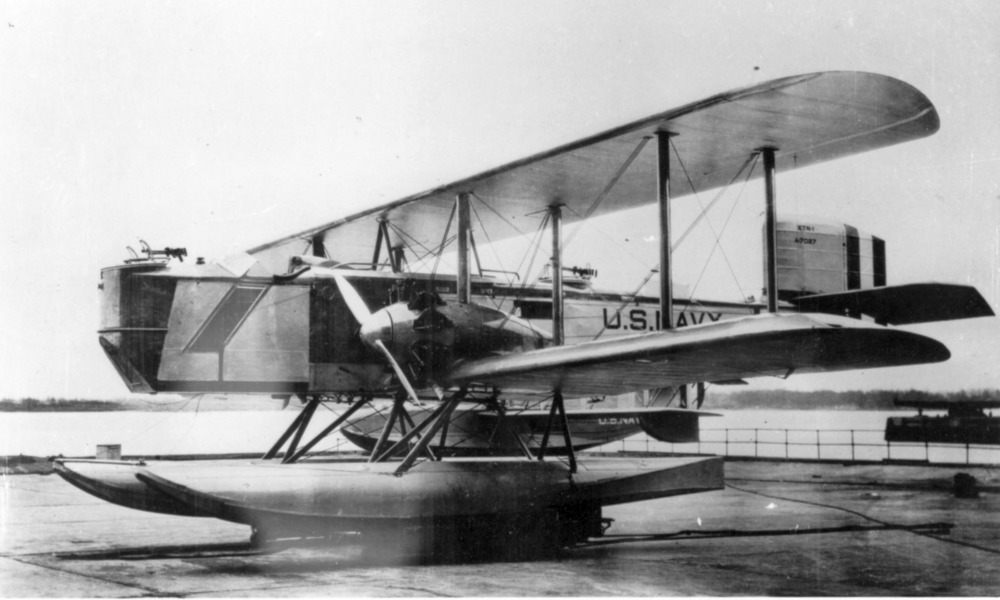
XTN-1 Prototype

XTN-1
Original prototype built by Naval Aircraft Factory. One built.
T2D-1
Production aircraft, convertible torpedo bomber/patrol floatplane, powered by Wright R-1750 Cyclones. 12 built.
P2D-1
Dedicated patrol floatplane. Fitted with twin tail for improved engine out performance and powered by two Wright R-1820 Cyclones. 18 built.

== Operators ==
United States

- United States Navy

== Specifications (T2D-1 landplane / floatplane) ==
Data from McDonnell Douglas aircraft since 1920 : Volume I

General characteristics

- Crew: 4
- Length: 42 ft (13 m) (landplane)

44 ft 4 in (13.51 m) (floatplane)

- Wingspan: 57 ft (17 m)
- Height: 15 ft 11 in (4.85 m) (landplane)

44 ft 4 in (13.51 m) (floatplane)

- Wing area: 886 sq ft (82.3 m^{2})
- Empty weight: 6,011 lb (2,727 kg) (landplane)

6,528 lb (2,961 kg) (floatplane)

- Gross weight: 9,986 lb (4,530 kg) (landplane)

10,503 lb (4,764 kg) (floatplane)

- Max takeoff weight: 10,523 lb (4,773 kg) (landplane)

11,040 lb (5,010 kg) (floatplane)

- Powerplant: 2 × Wright R-1750 Cyclone 9-cylinder air-cooled radial piston engines, 525 hp (391 kW) each
- Propellers: 3-bladed fixed-pitch metal propellers

Performance

- Maximum speed: 125 mph (201 km/h, 109 kn) at sea level (landplane)

124 mph (108 kn; 200 km/h) at sea level (floatplane)

- Range: 457 mi (735 km, 397 nmi) (landplane)

384 mi (334 nmi; 618 km) (floatplane)

- Ferry range: 454 mi (731 km, 395 nmi) (floatplane)
- Service ceiling: 13,830 ft (4,220 m) (landplane)

11,400 ft (3,500 m) (floatplane)

- Time to altitude: 5,000 ft (1,500 m) in 5 minutes 54 seconds (landplane)

5,000 ft (1,500 m) in 7 minutes 42 seconds (floatplane)

- Wing loading: 11.4 lb/sq ft (56 kg/m^{2}) (landplane)

11.9 lb/sq ft (58 kg/m^{2}) (floatplane)

- Power/mass: 0.105 hp/lb (0.173 kW/kg) (landplane)

0.1 hp/lb (0.16 kW/kg) (floatplane)

Armament

- Guns: *2 × .30 in (7.62 mm) M1919 Browning machine guns
- Bombs: *1 ×1,618 lb (734 kg) torpedo or equivalent bombload
