= Naval Aircraft Factory TS =

US Navy biplane fighter 1922–1929

TS-1
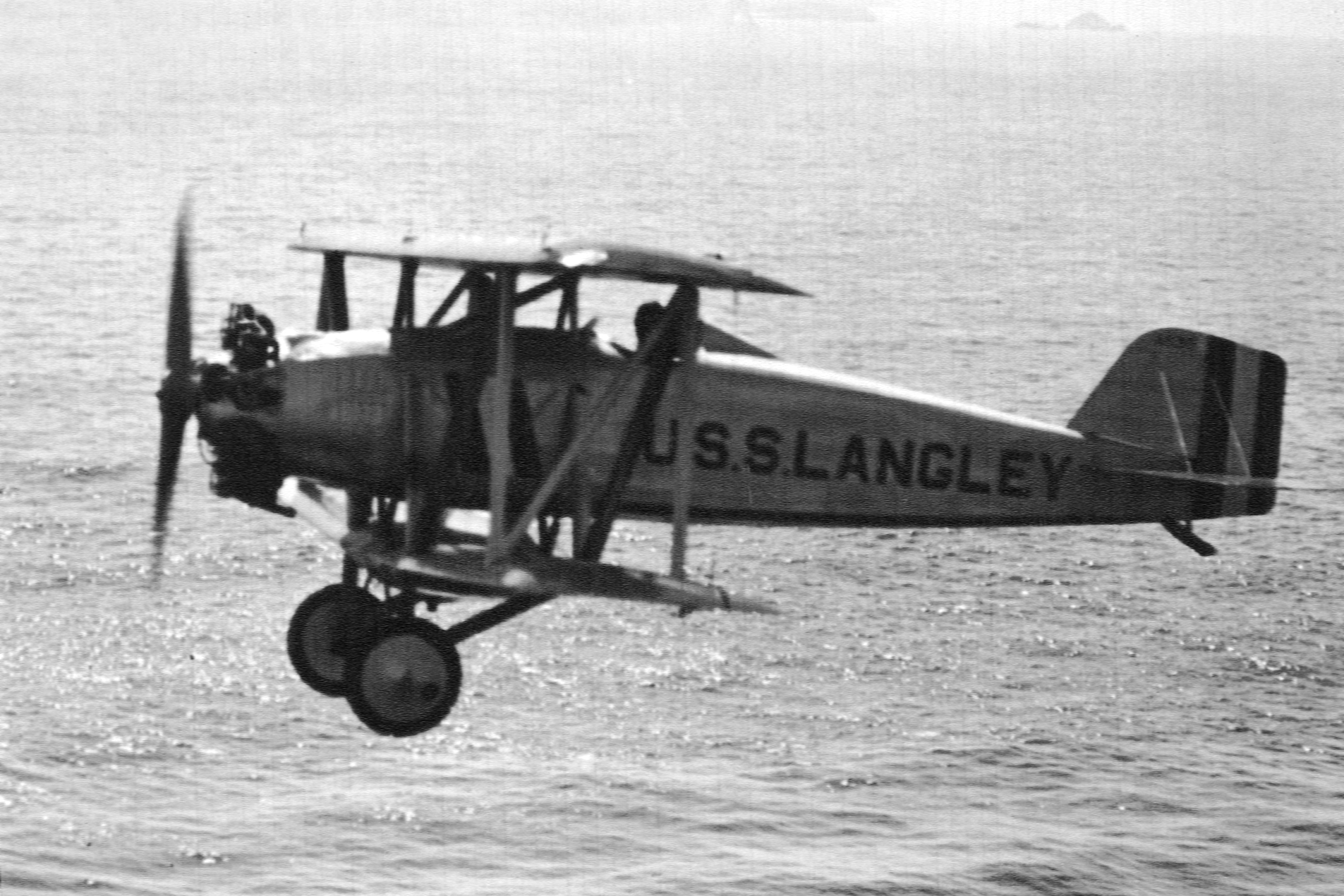
- A TS-1 assigned to USS Langley

General information
- Type: Naval Fighter
- Manufacturer: Naval Aircraft Factory; Curtiss Aeroplane and Motor Company
- Designer: Bureau of Aeronautics; Rex Buren Beisel
- Status: retired
- Primary user: United States Navy
- Number built: 46

History
- Introduction date: December 1922
- Retired: 1929

The Naval Aircraft Factory TS-1 is an early biplane fighter aircraft of the United States Navy, serving from 1922 to 1929.

== Development ==
While the Vought VE-7s were serving the Navy well in the early 1920s, they were not originally designed as fighters. The Naval Aircraft Factory came up with a simple design driven by a 200 hp (150 kW) Lawrance J-1 air-cooled radial engine. Its boxy fuselage was suspended between the upper and lower wings (essentially having both dorsal and ventral sets of cabane struts), with the center area of the lower wing enlarged to accommodate a fuel tank.

The NAF provided Curtiss with the plans to build the aircraft, and the result, designated TS-1, arrived at Anacostia on May 9, 1922. The TS-1 from Curtiss was delivered with wheels, so the NAF also designed wooden floats to enable their use on vessels other than aircraft carriers. Testing went well, and in late 1922 the Navy ordered 34 planes from Curtiss, with the first arriving on board the aircraft carrier USS Langley in December. The NAF built another five themselves, as a test of relative costs, as well as four more used to experiment with water-cooled inline engines.

Two all-metal versions of the aircraft, F4C-1s, were developed by Curtiss. This aircraft made its first flight on September 4, 1924. The wings had tubular spars and stamped duraluminum ribs, and the fuselage was constructed of duraluminum tubing in a Warren truss form. Compared to the TS-1, the lower wing was raised to the base of the fuselage. The F4C-1 was armed with two .30 in (7.62 mm) machine guns and was powered by a 200 hp nine-cylinder Wright J-3 radial.

== Operational history ==
In addition to operating from the carrier deck, the TS-1s served for several years in floatplane configuration aboard destroyers, cruisers, and battleships. The aircraft were slung over the side by crane or launched from capital ship catapults. Squadron VO-1 operated this way from 1922, and VF-1 flew its float-equipped TS-1s from battleships in 1925 and 1926.

The TS-1 was not universally liked by its crews. Positioning of the lower wing below the fuselage resulted in short wheel struts. This, and the wheels' placement close to each other, caused considerable problems with ground looping.

== Variants ==
NAF TS-1
five built

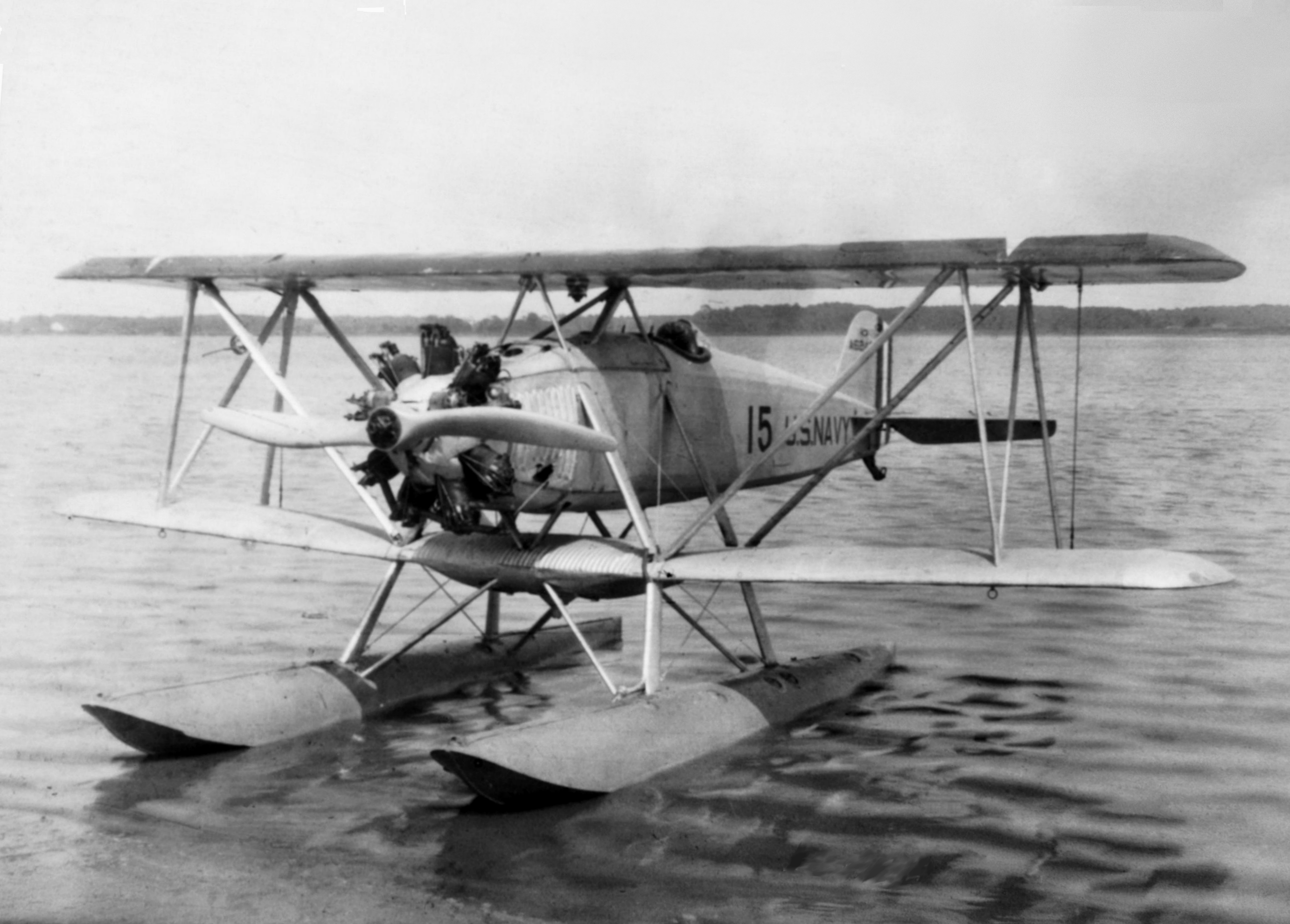
Curtiss TS-1

Curtiss TS-1
34 built
NAF TS-2
two built, 240 hp (180 kW) Aeromarine engine
NAF TS-3
two built, 180 hp (130 kW) Wright-Hispano E engine

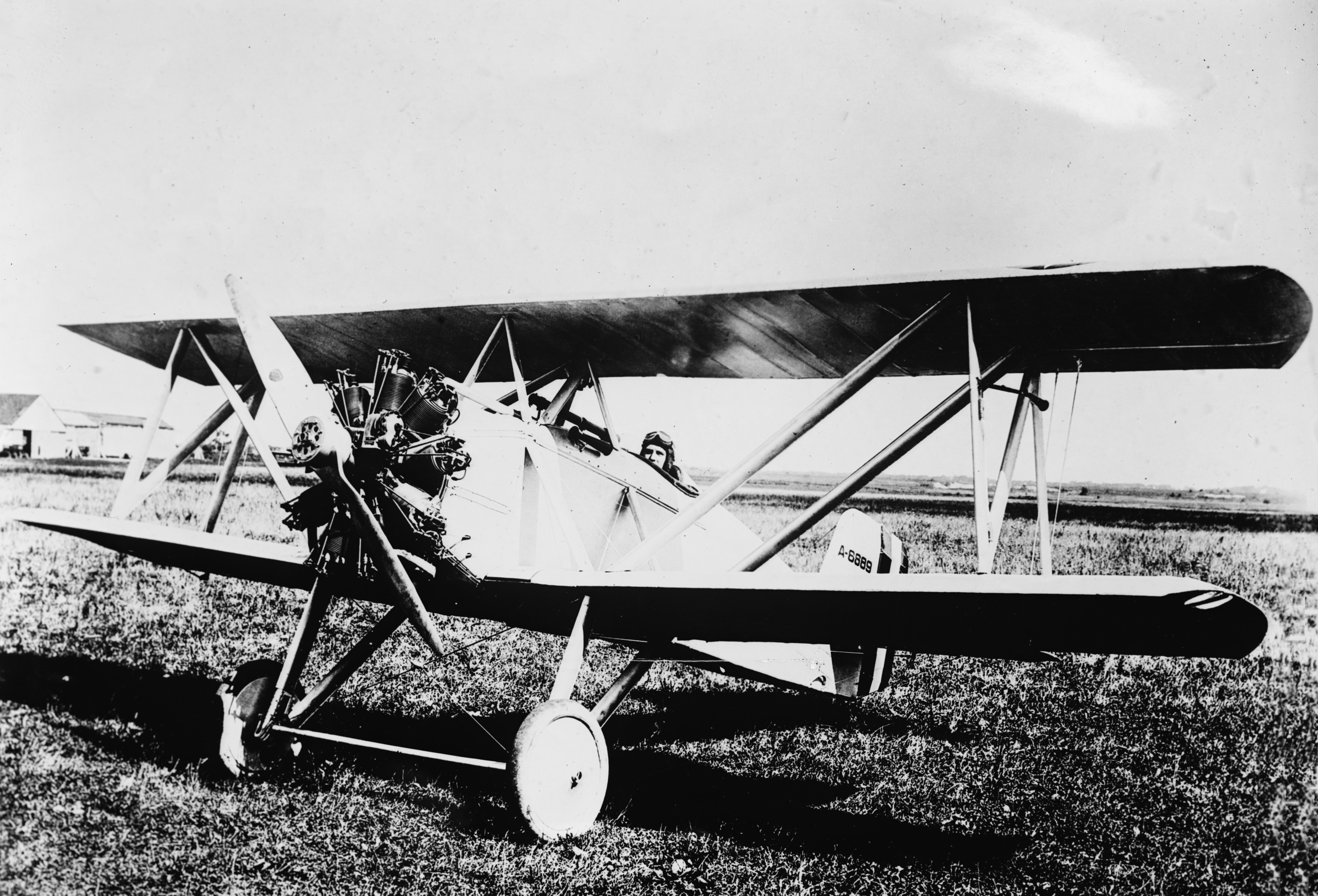
The first F4C-1 in 1924.

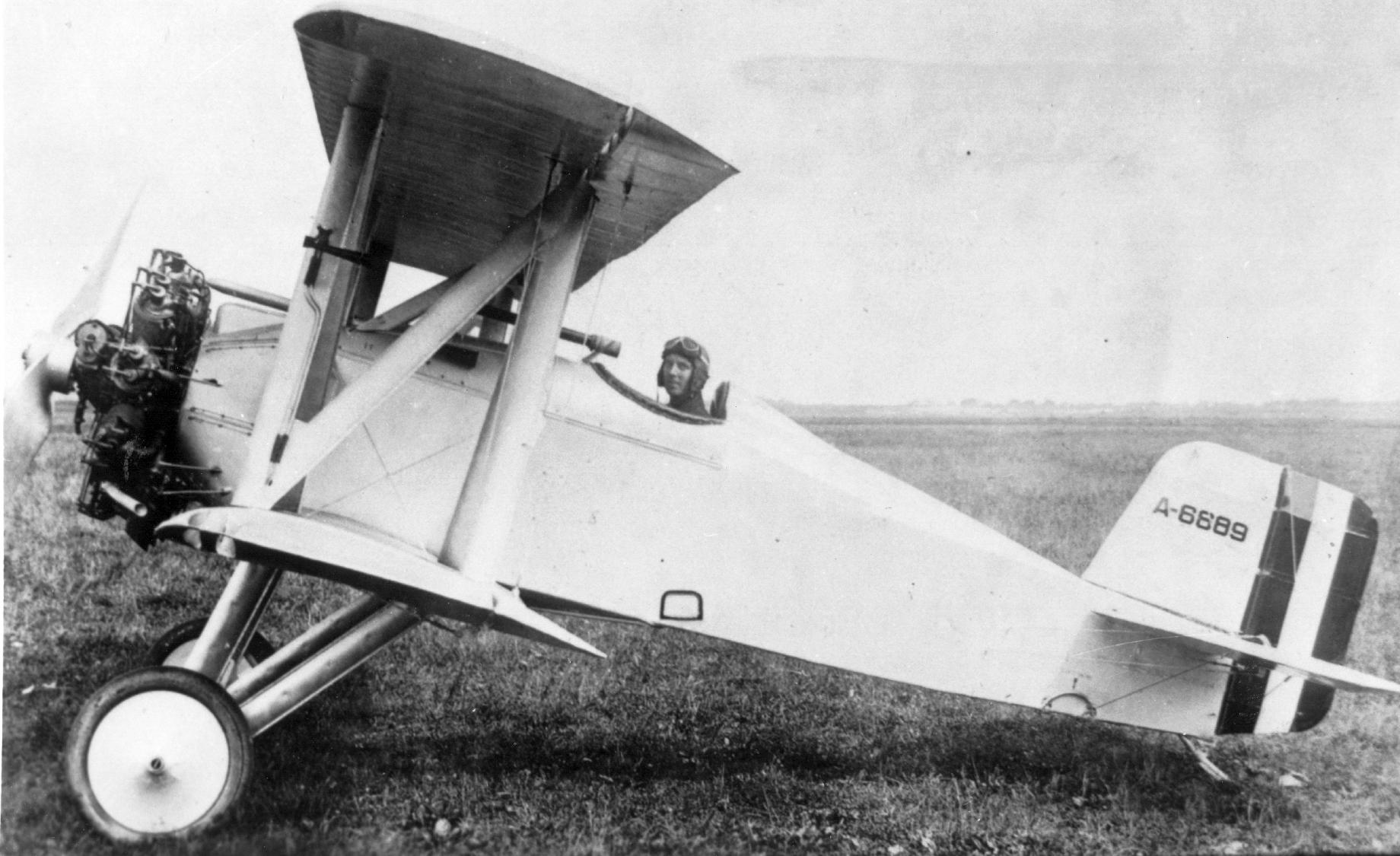
An F4C-1

NAF TR-2
one built, TS-3 modified by changing the airfoil section on the wings for the 1922 Curtiss Marine Trophy race
Curtiss-Hall F4C-1
All metal versions for comparison to the original wood and wire construction; two built.

== Operators ==
United States

- United States Navy
  - VO-1 (Spotting or Observation Plane Squadron) 1922-?
  - VF-1 (Fighting Squadron) 1925-1926

== Surviving aircraft ==
- A6446 – TS-2/3 owned by the National Air and Space Museum in Washington, D.C. It was previously on display at the National Naval Aviation Museum in Pensacola, Florida.

== Specifications (TS-1 landplane) ==
Data from Curtiss Aircraft 1907–1947, United States Navy aircraft since 1911

General characteristics

- Crew: 1
- Length: 22 ft 1.375 in (6.74053 m)
- Wingspan: 25 ft 0.3125 in (7.627938 m)
- Height: 8 ft 11.9375 in (2.741613 m)
- Wing area: 227.8 sq ft (21.16 m^{2})
- Airfoil: USA 27
- Empty weight: 1,239 lb (562 kg)
- Gross weight: 1,927.5 lb (874 kg)
- Powerplant: 1 × Lawrance J-1 9-cylinder air-cooled radial piston engine, 200 hp (150 kW)
- Propellers: 2-bladed fixed-pitch propeller

Performance

- Maximum speed: 131 mph (211 km/h, 114 kn)
- Cruise speed: 104.8 mph (168.7 km/h, 91.1 kn)
- Range: 468 mi (753 km, 407 nmi)
- Service ceiling: 14,400 ft (4,400 m)
- Rate of climb: 1,200 ft/min (6.1 m/s)

Armament

- Guns: 2x fixed forward-firing 0.300 in (7.62 mm) Browning machine gun
