= Vought VE-7 =

American military biplane (1917–1928)

VE-7 "Bluebird"
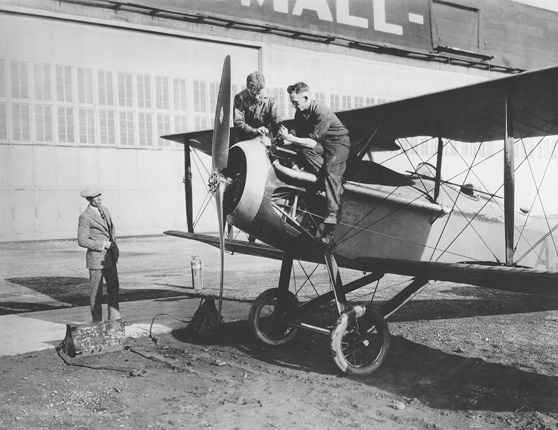
- Mechanics work on a VE-7

General information
- Type: Fighter and trainer
- Manufacturer: Lewis & Vought Corporation
- Designer: Chance M. Vought
- Primary users: United States Navy United States Army Air Service
- Number built: 128

History
- Manufactured: 1918-1928
- Introduction date: 1922
- First flight: 1917
- Retired: 1928

The Vought VE-7 "Bluebird" was an early biplane of the United States. First flying in 1917, it was designed as a two-seat trainer for the United States Army, then adopted by the United States Navy as its first fighter aircraft. In 1922, a VE-7 became the first airplane to take off from an American aircraft carrier. The VE-8 and VE-9 were variants of the VE-7.

== Design and development ==
The Lewis & Vought Corporation was formed just months after the U.S. entered World War I, with the intention of servicing war needs. The company's trainer was patterned after successful European designs; for instance, the engine was a Wright Hispano Suiza of the type used by the French Spads. In practice, the VE-7's performance was much better than usual for a trainer, and the Army ordered 1,000 of an improved design called the VE-8. However, the contract was cancelled due to the end of the war.

However, the Navy was very interested in the VE-7, and received the first machine in May 1920. Production orders soon followed, and in accordance to Navy policy at the time, examples were also built by the Naval Aircraft Factory. In all, 128 VE-7s were built.

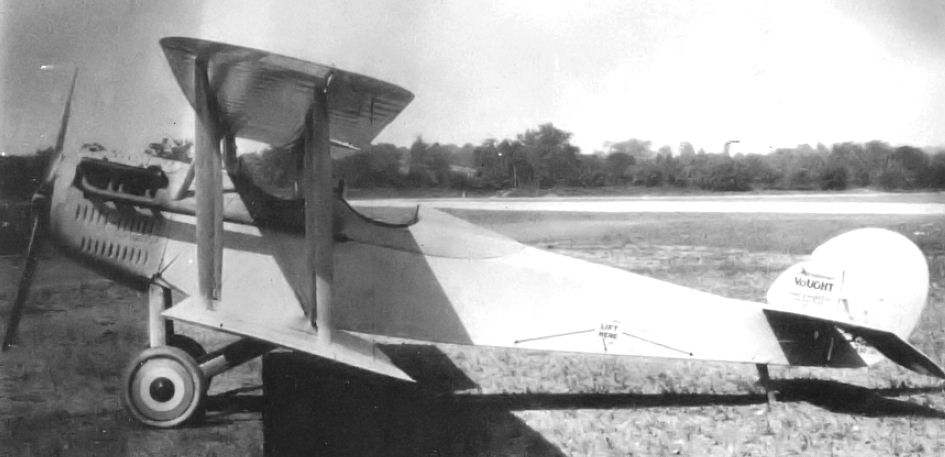
Vought VE-7 - McCook Field, Ohio 1917

The fighter version of the VE-7 was designated VE-7S. It was a single-seater, the front cockpit being faired over and a .30 in (7.62 mm) Vickers machine gun mounted over it on the left side and synchronized to fire through the propeller. Some planes, designated VE-7SF, had flotation gear consisting of inflatable bags stowed away, available to help keep the plane afloat when ditching at sea.

The Bluebird won the 1918 Army competition for advanced training machines.

The VE-8 variant completed in July 1919 had a 340hp Wright-Hispano H engine, reduced overall dimensions, increased wing area, a shorter faired cabane, and two Vickers guns. Two were completed. Flight test results were disappointing, the aircraft was overweight, with heavy controls, inadequate stability and sluggish performance.

The VE-9 variant, first delivered to the Navy on 24 June 1922, was essentially an improved VE-7, with most of the improvements in the fuel system area. Four of the 21 ordered by the U.S. Navy were unarmed observation float seaplanes for battleship catapult use.

== Operational history ==
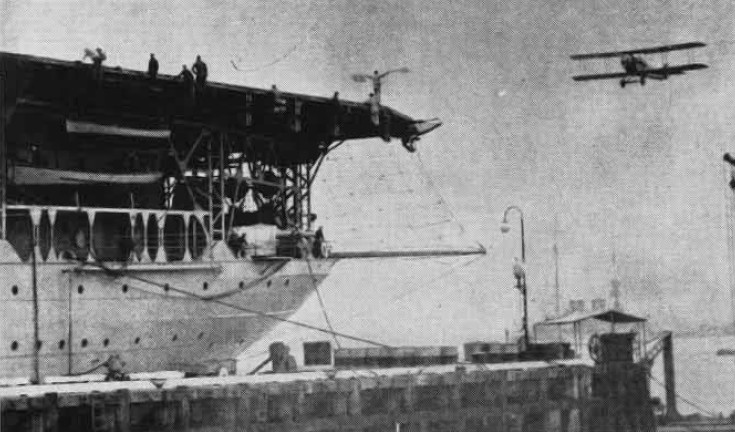
Vought VE-7 approaching USS Langley, 1922. Note the Landing Signal Officer.

The VE-7s equipped the Navy's first two fighter squadrons VF-1 and VF-2. A VE-7 flown by Lieutenant Virgil C. Griffin made history on October 17, 1922, when it took off from the deck of the newly commissioned carrier Langley. The VE-7s were the Navy's frontline fighters for several years, with three still assigned to the Langley in 1927; all were retired the following year.

== Variants ==
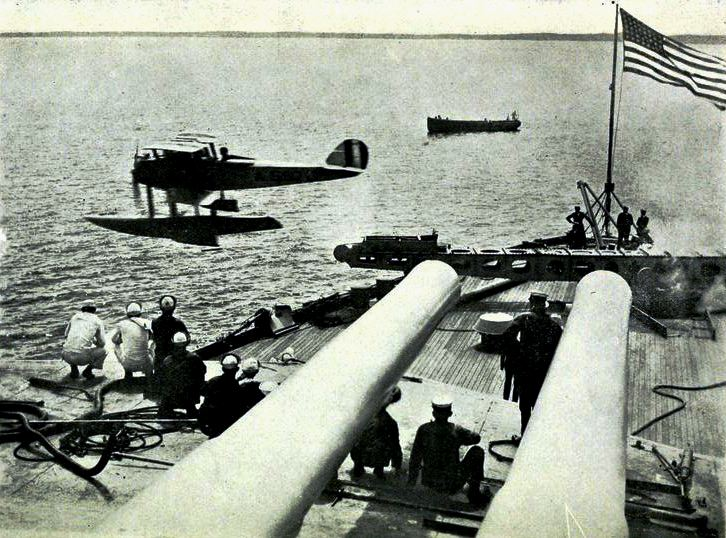
VE-7 being catapulted from the USS Maryland (BB-46)

- VE-7 (1918) - 14 built for the U.S. Army Air Service; 39 built for the U.S. Navy; (one of two known, built at McCook Field. Reportedly four more were built by Springfield Co)
- VE-7F (1921) - 29 built for the U.S. Navy
- VE-7G (1921) - One converted from VE-7 for U.S. Marine Corps, 23 converted from VE-7 for U.S. Navy
- VE-7GF (1921) - One converted from VE-7
- VE-7H (1924) - Nine observation seaplanes built for the U.S. Navy
- VE-7S (1925) - One converted from VE-7
- VE-7SF (1925) - 11 built for the U.S. Navy
- VE-7SH - One VE-7SF converted into a floatplane.
- VE-8 (1918) - Four ordered by the U.S. Army on October 11, 1918; two were canceled; 340 hp Wright-Hispano H engine installed, two Vickers guns, wingspan decreased to 31 ft (9.4 m), wing area increased to 307 sq ft (28.5 m^{2}), shortened to 21 ft 4 in (6.50 m), speed increased to 140 mph (230 km/h), loaded weight increased to 2,435 lb (1,104 kg)
- VE-9 (1921) - Two converted from VE-7 for U.S. Army; speed increased to 119 mph (192 km/h), service ceiling increased to 18,840 ft (5,740 m)
- VE-9 (1927) - 22 built for the U.S. Army, 17 built for the U.S. Navy. (U.S. Army used same designation as U.S. Navy)
- VE-9H (1927) - Four unarmed observation float seaplanes built for the U.S. Navy battleships, modified vertical tail surfaces for improved catapult and water stability
- VE-9W - canceled

== Surviving aircraft ==
No survivors remain, however a replica Bluebird was completed in early 2007 by volunteers of the Vought Aircraft Heritage Foundation. It is now on display at the National Naval Aviation Museum in Pensacola, Florida.

== Operators ==
United States

- United States Army Air Service
- United States Navy

== Specifications (VE-7) ==
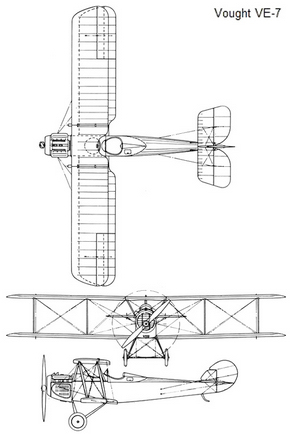
Vought VE-7 3-view drawing

Data from Janes Fighting Aircraft of World War I by Michael John Haddrick Taylor (Random House Group Ltd. 20 Vauxhall Bridge Road, London SW1V 2SA, 2001, ISBN 1-85170-347-0), 320 pp.

General characteristics

- Crew: two
- Length: 24 ft 5.375 in (7.45 m)
- Wingspan: 34 ft 4 in (10.47 m)
- Height: 8 ft 7.5 in (2.63 m)
- Wing area: 284.5 sq ft (26.43 m^{2})
- Airfoil: RAF-15
- Empty weight: 1,392 lb (631 kg)
- Gross weight: 1,937 lb (879 kg)
- Powerplant: 1 × Wright-Hispano E-3 liquid cooled V-8, 180 hp (134 kW)
- Propellers: 2-bladed, 8 ft 8 in (2.64 m) diameter wooden fixed pitch propeller

Performance

- Maximum speed: 106 mph (171 km/h, 92 kn)
- Range: 290 mi (467 km, 250 nmi)
- Service ceiling: 15,000 ft (4,600 m)
- Rate of climb: 738 ft/min (3.75 m/s)

Armament

- Guns: (VE-7S) 1 x .30 in (7.62 mm) Vickers machine gun machine gun synchronized to fire through the propeller
