= List of accidents and incidents involving military aircraft (1925–1934) =

This is a list of accidents and incidents involving military aircraft grouped by the year in which the accident or incident occurred. Not all of the aircraft were in operation at the time. Combat losses are not included except for a very few cases denoted by singular circumstances.

== Aircraft terminology ==
Information on aircraft gives the type, and if available, the serial number of the operator in italics, the constructors number, also known as the manufacturer's serial number (c/n), exterior codes in apostrophes, nicknames (if any) in quotation marks, flight callsign in italics, and operating units.

== 1925 ==
10 February
The 1030 hrs. crash of a Curtiss JN-6H, AS-44806, ~2 miles (3.2 km) E of Brooks Field, Texas, kills instructor 1st Lt. Arthur L. Foster along with Maj. Lee O. Wright. Foster Field at Victoria, Texas is later dedicated to the pilot on 22 February 1942. Foster's widow, Mrs. Ruth Young Foster, of San Antonio, Texas, unveiled a plaque that read "Dedicated to the memory of Lieut. Arthur Lee Foster, a pioneer in aviation who gave his life teaching others to fly." Foster Field was designated Foster Air Force Base on an inactive status on 1 September 1952, by Department of the Air Force General Order No. 38, dated 29 August 1952.
16/17 April
British airship R33 is torn loose from the mooring mast at RAF Pulham by gale force winds. Blown over to the Dutch coast, it rides the storm out with minor damage, finally returning more than a day later.
7 May
Maj. Charles Calvert Benedict, (USMA, 1915), flying from Langley Field, Virginia, is killed in Eberhart S.E.5e, 22–320, of the Air Corps Tactical School, when he collides with a balloon. Maj. Carl "Tooey" Spatz recorded in his diary on 10 May 1925, "Benedict was killed Friday last by colliding with a balloon he was attacking. Inference: at our age muscle reactions lag behind mental impulses. Aviators after 30 years of age must allow a large majority of safety in their flying." Capt. Benedict was the first commander of Chanute Field, Illinois, and succeeded Spatz as training officer at the Issoudun, France, training centre when Spatz took command of the 3rd Aviation Instruction Center a second time.
13 June
U.S. Navy Lieutenant Frank White, out of Bolling Field, develops engine trouble, attempts landing on Burlington Island, overshoots the island and crashes his De Havilland DH-4B fighter plane, 22-1186, into the Delaware River outside Bristol, Pennsylvania. Was rescued alive and in good spirits but died two weeks later in Harriman Hospital shortly after surgery due to internal injuries.
11 July
"EL SEGUNDO, July 11 - Two aviators were killed when their airplane fell and burned near here today. The dead are: Lieutenant Hugh R. Denny, of the Aerial Reserves, Clover Field, Santa Monica, and M. D. McClennan, of Santa Monica, son of County Supervisor R. F. McClennan." In an unusual circumstance, the records of the United States Army Air Service did not record, nor do they reveal the type of aircraft involved in this incident, nor a serial number for the lost ship. "Neil D. McClellan" is listed as the pilot in this case, however.
31 August
U.S. Navy Naval Aircraft Factory PN-9, BuNo A-6878, '1', flying boat disappears on flight from San Francisco to Hawaii with reported loss of crew. The PN-9 was not actually lost, it was just overdue. After staying in the air for 25 hours and covering 1,841 miles (2,963 km) of the 2,400 miles (3,900 km) to Pearl Harbor, it landed safely at sea, the crew under command of Commander John Rodgers, Naval Aviator No. 2, rigged sails from fabric from the lower wing and sailed the final 450 miles (720 km), reaching Kauai on 10 September. This stood as a seaplane distance flight record for several years. The aircraft is repaired and shipped to San Diego, California.
3 September
U.S. Navy airship, USS Shenandoah ZR-1, crashes after encountering thunderstorms near Ava, Ohio after an in-flight break up due to cloud suck about 0445 hrs. Fourteen of 43 aboard are killed. The ship's commanding officer, Lt. Cdr. Zachary Lansdowne, is killed on what was to have been his final flight before reassignment to sea duty.
23 September
The U.S. Navy flies 23 Curtiss CS-1 floatplanes to Bay Shore Park on the Chesapeake Bay, 14 miles (23 km) SE of Baltimore, Maryland, on a Friday with intention of an airshow demonstration before the 1925 Schneider Cup Race on Saturday, but that night gale force winds break 3-inch (76 mm) mooring and anchor ropes on 17 of the biplanes and they are blown onto shore or dashed against seawalls, destroying seven and damaging ten. The next afternoon's Baltimore Evening Sun runs the headline "Plane Disaster in Harbor Called Hard Blow to Navy" and quotes the ever-outspoken General William "Billy" Mitchell calling the loss of the CS-1s "staggering", and blaming it on Navy mismanagement of its aviation program.
24 September
During the 1925 Schneider Trophy race, British entry Supermarine S.4 loses control, is seen to side-slip, then pancakes into the Chesapeake Bay, landing on the front of its floats and overturning. Pilot Henri Biard swims free of airframe and is rescued. British officials intimate that the pilot banked too steeply and stalled, but designer R.J. Mitchell suspected that the cantilever wing design may have been partially at fault. Another British entry, Gloster IIIA, suffers broken strut between float and fuselage during taxi after landing from first run which allows nose to drop, propeller cuts into duralumin float, making airframe unable to compete. Lt. Jimmy Doolittle in U.S. Army Curtiss R3C-2, BuNo A6979, '3', wins competition with top speed of 233 miles per hour (375 km/h).
9 December
The 111th Observation Squadron, Texas National Guard, suffers its first casualties when Capt. Emil Wagner and Lt. Luke McLaughlin put a Curtiss JN-6H, 38105, into a steep dive, whereupon the port wing collapses and the airframe plummets to the ground at Ellington Field, Texas. Both crew survive the impact but die later in a Houston hospital.

== 1926 ==
28 February
"SEATTLE, Feb. 28. - Lieutenant Alonzo E. Bell was killed and his mechanician [sic], Charles Casincros, seriously hurt when their airplane went into a nose dive and dropped 100 feet to a concrete roadway at Sand Point field [sic] near here today. Two hundred persons witnessed the accident."
10 March
U.S. Army airship TA-5, operating from Langley Field, Virginia, loses helium pressure in its non-rigid envelope and drops into the Chesapeake Bay, nose first. No injuries to the crew who are quickly picked up by a rescue boat.
22 March
On its seventh test flight during tests at Taura Beach, Yokosuka, Japan, the Kaibo Gikai KB experimental flying boat is seen in a glide with both engines stopped, which steepens until it strikes the water in a near-vertical attitude, killing all four crew. Cause attributed to a malfunction of the flight control system.
10 May
Maj. Harold C. Geiger is slightly injured in a collision between two planes at Langley Field, near Hampton, Virginia. While attending the Air Corps Tactical School at Langley Field, his Eberhart S.E.5e, 22-317, collides in mid-air during a flight formation with fellow student, Horace Meek Hickam's Royal Aircraft Factory S.E.5a, SO-8044. Hickam parachutes to safety, and narrowly escapes death. Hickam is initiated into the famed Caterpillar Club, a fraternal order with membership based on surviving an emergency parachute jump. Geiger was also a member of the Caterpillar Club.
11 August
Second Lieutenant Eugene Hoy Barksdale was killed when the Douglas O-2 observation plane, 25–350, McCook Field project number P-441, he was testing went into an uncontrollable spin over McCook Field, Dayton, Ohio. His parachute snagged on the wingstruts, preventing escape from the aircraft. Barksdale Field, later Barksdale Air Force Base, is named for him upon establishment at the Military Reservation, Bossier Parish, Louisiana on 2 February 1933.
27 August
Commander John Rodgers, Naval Aviator No. 2, Assistant Chief of the Bureau of Aeronautics, on a flight from NAS Anacostia, Washington, D.C., crashes in the Delaware River near the Naval Aircraft Factory dock, Philadelphia, Pennsylvania, when his aircraft suddenly nose-dives and receives injuries from which he dies on the same day.
12 September
Curtiss XP-6, 25-423, the fourth Curtiss P-2 reengined with a Curtiss V-1570-1 Conqueror, suffers heavy damage in a landing that results in a ground loop at Selfridge Field, Mount Clemens, Michigan. Pilot was George C. Price. Repaired, the aircraft will finish second in the 1927 Pursuit Plane Race at the National Air Races, at 189.608 miles per hour (305.144 km/h). To McCook Field, Ohio, with project number P-494. Will crash on 25 February 1929.
20 September
The Great Miami hurricane makes landfall for the second time near Perdido Beach, Alabama, at ~ 22:00 UTC with winds of 100 mph (160 km/h). At NAS Pensacola, Florida, the storm destroys 30 seaplanes, several hangars, "and other equipment for a total damage of about $1,000,000."

== 1927 ==
19 January
Second of two Naval Aircraft Factory PN-7 flying boats, BuNo A-6617, delivered 6 June 1924, is wrecked this date at San Diego, California, with total flight time of 423:32 hours.
February
RAF Cierva C.6C autogyro, J8068, based on an Avro 504K fuselage, constructed by Avro at Hamble, Hampshire, flown by test pilot Frank T. Courtney, suffers spectacular crash at Hamble in which two opposing rotor blades come loose in flight after failure of tubular rivet fitted in the rotor blade spar root, coming down adjacent to rail line crossing the airfield. Pilot survives.
February
RAF Vickers Virginia Mk II J6857 of 7 Squadron is damaged in a forced landing at Fakenham, Norfolk. The aircraft is subsequently repaired and rebuilt to Mk VII standard.
27 February
Capt. Clinton F. Woolsey, a Northport, Michigan native born in 1894, was considered one of the nation's best pilots in the Army Air Corps in the 1920s. He died a hero when he and his co-pilot, Lt. John W. Benton, were killed in a 1927 mid-air collision over Palomar Field near Buenos Aires during the first-ever U.S. international goodwill flight to 23 Central and South American countries. The 22,000-mile (35,000 km) tour took two months. Buenos Aires was the halfway mark. Woolsey probably could have parachuted to safety but apparently chose to ride his amphibian biplane down in an attempt to land because Benton was on the wing, without his chute, attempting to lower the landing gear by hand. "I have never witnessed a more courageous sacrifice," said Capt. Ira Eaker, who witnessed the crash from his plane. Flight Commander Herbert Dargue and Lt. Ennis Whitehead bailed out of Loening OA-1A "New York", while Woolsey and Benton rode OA-1A "Detroit" in.
13 March
First of two Naval Aircraft Factory PN-8 flying boats, BuNo A-6799, delivered 8 May 1925, intended for a flight by the Navy from San Francisco to Hawaii, is wrecked while being transported fully assembled on the deck of the USS West Virginia. Hit by heavy seas, the plane is lifted against its tie-down cables, which cut through the hull, airframe written off with 32:48 flying hours.
21 March
U.S. Navy Naval Aircraft Factory PN-9, BuNo A-6878, flying boat which executed record trip from San Francisco to Hawaii in August–September 1925, repaired and shipped to San Diego, California, crashes and sinks in the ocean this date with total flight time of 190:28 hours.
21 April
Their Royal Highnesses visit Australia to open the new Parliament House in Canberra. On this date, during their official visit to Melbourne, "and just as the royal procession was turning from St Kilda Road into the grounds of Government House, two DH.9 aircraft of the RAAF flypast collided. The crowd of many thousands watched as A6-5 and A6-26 disintegrated and plummeted to earth in the vicinity of Sturt Street, South Melbourne. Fortunately, there were no casualties among the crowd but all four RAAF aircrew were killed making it the worst aircraft accident in Australia to that time."
9 May
Their Royal Highnesses, still in Australia, have the misfortune to witness the crash of SE-5a, A2-24, during the opening ceremony of Parliament House in Canberra. The pilot F/O F.C. Ewen is killed. "The following day, while returning from Canberra to Melbourne with photographs of the opening ceremony, SE-5a A2-11 suffered an engine failure and crashed in remote bushland near Whitfield, Vic. The pilot, Sgt Orm Denny, walked 25 miles to secure assistance."
17 May
Major Harold C. Geiger (7 October 1884 – 17 May 1927), born in East Orange, New Jersey, a pioneer in Army aviation and ballooning, and commander of Phillips Field, Aberdeen, Maryland, is killed in the crash of his Airco DH.4B plane, 25-078. Six mechanics and officers at the Middleton Air Station, at Olmsted Field, Pennsylvania told The New York Times Geiger's plane took a 50-foot (15 m) nose dive. Geiger managed to jump out just as the plane struck and burst into flames. He made desperate efforts to get clear of the wreckage and, according to the onlookers, half crawled and ran as far as the tail of the machine before he was overcome. There he dropped and the flames prevented the watchers from getting near enough to rescue him. When the U.S. Army Air Corps purchases Sunset Field near Spokane, Washington in 1941, it is named Geiger Field in his honor. The Spokane International Airport is designated with the International Air Transport Association airport code GEG in his memory.
16 June
A RAF Vickers Virginia makes an emergency landing at Shipbourne, Kent following an engine failure. The aircraft was later dismantled and removed by road.
6 July
The crash/ditching in the Pacific Ocean ~1 mile (1.6 km) off of Fort DeRussy, Territory of Hawaii, of Boeing PW-9A, 26-353, c/n 778, of the 19th Pursuit Squadron, from Wheeler Field, Oahu, kills Arizona native 1st Lt. Charles Linton Williams (1898–1927). Higley Field, at Mesa, Arizona, is renamed Williams Field on 24 February 1942, and Williams Air Force Base in January 1948. The base was closed on 30 December 1993.
29 September
Georg Wulf, co-founder of Focke-Wulf, is killed in the crash of the first Focke-Wulf F 19 Ente ("Duck"), D-1960. Second airframe is constructed, eventually put on display in Berlin air museum, destroyed in bombing raid in 1944.
27 October
"SAN ANTONIO, Tex., Oct. 27. - Two student fliers, who made successful parachute jumps after their planes had collided 2500 feet above Kelly field (sic) today face possible court martial charges because of the accident. Kelly field (sic) officials said that the two pilots, J. D. Cleveland of Cleveland, and E. A. Sanburn of Upper Lake, Cal., were engaged in unauthorized ‘dog-fighting’ at the time of the accident. They were flying in a three-ship formation of pursuit planes in a manoeuver designed to perfect them in flying solo planes. Officials said, however, that they were supposed to adhere to their formation, and not simulate actual dual combat in the air. According to the officers this was what caused the accident. After the planes interlocked and plunged together toward the earth, the two pilots made perfectly timed parachute jumps. The planes did not become disengaged until they were 500 feet above the ground. Both were demolished, even the motors being hopelessly wrecked. The matter will be referred to an investigating board Friday, which will decide on the advisability of putting the case before a court martial." Curtiss AT-4 Hawk, 27-219, flown by J. B. Cleveland, according to the Aviation Archeology Data Base, collided with AT-4, 27-215, flown by E. A. Sanborn, 8 miles (13 km) NW of Kelly Field. (Note slight spelling differences of names.)
4 November
US Army Air Corps Capt. Hawthorne C. Gray succeeds in setting new altitude record in a silk, rubberized, and aluminum-coated balloon out of Scott Field, Illinois, reaching 42,270 feet (12,880 m), but dies when he fails to keep track of his time on oxygen, and exhausts his supply. The record is recognized by National Aeronautical Association, but not by the Fédération Aéronautique Internationale because the dead aeronaut "was not in personal possession of his instruments." Gray is posthumously awarded the Distinguished Flying Cross for his three ascents on 9 March, 4 May and 4 November.
8 December
Prototype Curtiss XB-2 Condor, 26-211, assigned to Wright Field, Ohio in October 1927, crashes at Buffalo, New York after having logged only 58 hours, 55 minutes flying time.

== 1928 ==
13 February
Sole prototype Blackburn F.1 Turcock, the firm's first fighter project in some eight years, an attempt to produce an aircraft equally suited as a land-based interceptor and as a ship-borne fighter, found no interest from the Air Ministry, but Blackburn built one as a private venture. It first flew (without guns) on 14 November 1927, piloted by Flt. Lt. Arthur George Loton, AFC, and having been purchased by the Turkish government was named the Turcock. Allocated the British registration G-EBVP for test and delivery purposes, it was destroyed in a flying accident this date. No other models of the type were built.
17 February
Capt. William Millican Randolph, a pioneer aviator, a 1916 graduate of Texas A&M University, and adjutant of the Air Corps Flying School at Kelly Field, Texas, is killed in the crash of a Curtiss AT-4 Hawk, 27–220, three miles NW of Gorman, Texas after take off from Gorman Field. In September 1929, the Army Air Corps names its field north of San Antonio, Texas, Randolph Field for the Austin, Texas native. Randolph was interred at Fort Sam Houston, Texas. Ironically, Captain Randolph had been a member of the committee assigned to select a name for the new airfield. Randolph had survived wrecking a Fokker D.VII at Modesto, California, on 19 April 1920.
27 February
Commander Theodore Gordon Ellyson, the first Naval Aviator, Lieutenant Commander Hugo Schmidt and Lieutenant Rogers Ransehounsen, crash to their deaths in the sole Loening XOL-7 amphibian, A7335, (an OL-6 modified with an experimental thicker wing), in the lower Chesapeake Bay while on a night flight from Norfolk, Virginia, to Annapolis, Maryland. The Navy searches for the lost aircraft for a month without success. On 11 March the office of the Secretary of the Navy cables Helen Ellyson, "Very reluctantly yesterday the Secretary came to the conclusion that it was necessary for us to declare the officers who were lost in the plane with your husband officially dead. We had hoped against hope that something might be found of those officers living but it does not seem now that there is any hope left." On 11 April, Ellyson’s body washed ashore in the lower Chesapeake Bay.
May
Sumitoshi Nakao becomes the first Japanese aviator to save his life by parachute when he bails out of one of two Mitsubishi 1MF2 Hayabusa-type fighter prototypes when it disintegrates during a diving test during official Army trials at Tokorozawa. Pilot uninjured. Because of the accident, further flight evaluations of the type are suspended and the other airframe is statically tested to destruction.
1 May
Curtiss O-1B Falcon, 27-279, assigned at Middletown Air Depot, Pennsylvania, crashes at Whitney Point, New York, this date. Pilot Lt. Bushrod Hoppin is uninjured, but his passenger, Congressman Thaddeus Campbell Sweet is killed. Sweet becomes the first sitting member of the U.S. Congress to die in a plane crash. He and the pilot had departed Bolling Field shortly after breakfast "in a new Army observation plane" to fly to Oswego, New York, where he was to make a speech. Lt. Hoppin, known as a careful pilot, flew into a storm between Binghamton, New York and Cortland, New York. He thought it best to land and selected a field on a stock farm near Whitney Point. The field was knobbly, and the airplane bounced and turned a somersault. Sweet, having unbuckled his safety belt, was pitched against the cockpit wall, and killed by a head injury. Lt. Hoppin, belted in his seat, was unbruised. Sweet was buried at the Rural Cemetery at Phoenix, New York.

28 May
U.S. Army Air Corps Fokker CO-4A, 23-1206, based at Langley Field, Virginia, piloted by Major George H. Brett, is damaged in a take off accident at Quantico, Virginia.

6 July
Douglas C-1C, 26-427, c/n 372, assigned at Bolling Field, Washington, D.C., piloted by 1st Lt. Myron Ray Wood, suffers engine failure and ditches in the Potomac River near the west shoreline, Washington, D.C. Brig. Gen. Wood (4 December 1892 – 29 October 1946) will head the 9th AAF Service Command in Europe in 1944.

9 September
During events held during the National Air Races at Mines Field, Los Angeles, the program "was marred by the crash of Lieut. George E. Hasselman, U.S.Navy, of the VB-2B Squadron, who crashed 50 feet to the ground in a side slip and was seriously injured." VB-2B operated Boeing F2B-1s in 1928.

10 September
While performing aerobatics at the air races held at Mines Field, Los Angeles, Lt. John J. "Johnny" Williams, leader of the Three Musketeers Air Corps stunt trio, crashes in Boeing PW-9D, 28-29, c/n 1013, of the 95th Pursuit Squadron, out of Rockwell Field, California, and is killed "almost instantly. Despite their comrade's untimely death, Lieuts. Woodring and Cornelius carried on. Colonel Charles A. Lindbergh volunteered his services, and the show continued."

20 September
First prototype Parnall Pipit, N232, suffers structural failure of port tailplane in flight, crash lands at Martlesham Heath, Aeroplane and Armament Experimental Establishment (A&AEE) test pilot Sqn. Ldr. Jack Noakes (AFC, MM) survives, despite suffering broken neck when thrown from the somersaulting airframe.

25 September
Boeing PW-9D, 28-31, flown by Lt. Roger V. Williams, suffers mid-air collision with PW-9D, 28-36, piloted by Lt. William L. Cornelius, both of the 95th Pursuit Squadron, at Rockwell Field, San Diego, California. Williams bails out and survives but Cornelius is killed. Cornelius was one of the Three Musketeers Air Corps stunt trio pilots. "SAN DIEGO, Sept. 26. - Military services will be held either tomorrow or Friday for Lieutenant W. L. Williams, of 'Three Musketeer' fame, killed in a crash with another plane in the air yesterday," (Note the name discrepancy in the United Press dispatch, which is in error.)

30 October
1st Lt. Myron R. Wood has his second adventure in a Bolling Field-based aircraft in four months when he ground loops Curtiss P-1A Hawk, 26-279, upon landing at the base on the Potomac River's east side, Washington, D.C. Aircraft receives moderate damage.

3 December
The prototype Curtiss XF8C-2, BuNo A7673, crashes during a terminal-velocity dive, just days after its first flight. Another source cites the loss date as 23 December 1928.

== 1929 ==
24 January
Surplus Royal Aircraft Factory S.E.5a, (original serial unknown), presented to Aviación Naval (Argentine Naval arm), E-11/AC-21, written-off in crash landing at Campo Sarmiento, Base Naval Puerto Belgrano, Argentina when pilot Alferez de Fragata Alberto Sautu Riestra approaches field too flat and lands short, collapsing undercarriage. Pilot uninjured. As the airframe was an obsolescent one-only on strength design, with no supporting plans or parts, it is scrapped.
25 February
Curtiss XP-6 Hawk (fourth P-2, 25–423, converted with Curtiss V-1570-1 engine), of the 27th Pursuit Squadron, is destroyed in crash at Selfridge Field, Michigan, after structural failure in a spin/stall with only 80 flying hours, killing pilot Andrew D. Knox. This airframe had won the Pursuit Plane Race in the 1927 National Air Races with a speed of 189.608 mph.
21 April
A U.S. Army Air Corps Boeing PW-9D, 28-037, c/n 1022, collided with a Ford 5-AT-B Trimotor, NC9636, c/n 5-AT-10, operated by Maddux Air Lines over San Diego, California, killing all 6 on board both aircraft.
18 May
During the 1929 U.S. Army maneuvers, two Boeing P-12s of the 95th Pursuit Squadron, operating out of Norton Field (the first airfield to be built in central Ohio), collide over the Linden neighborhood on the north side of Columbus, Ohio, the propeller of 2nd Lt. Andrew F. Solter's XP-12A, 29-362, cutting into the rear fuselage of 2nd Lt. Edward L. Meadow's P-12 (possibly 29-361). Meadow is killed but Solter bails out and lands safely. Gen. Benjamin Foulois tells newsmen, "It's all in a day's work of the Air Corps. Although an unhappy occurrence, the accident will cause no change in the maneuver plans, which will be carried out as scheduled."
4 September
First prototype, of three, Gloster Gorcocks, J7501, experimental single-seat, single-bay biplane interceptor, first delivered to the Royal Aircraft Establishment on 16 May 1928, breaks up in the air near Aldershot this date, the pilot bailing out successfully.
15 October
Martin XT5M-1 divebomber, BuNo A-8051, during terminal dive test at 350 IAS at 8,000 feet, lower starboard wing caves in, ripping extensive hole. NACA test pilot Bill H. McAvoy staggers aircraft back to the Martin field north of Baltimore, Maryland, landing at 110 mph with full-left stick input. Aircraft will go into production as the Martin BM-1.
14 November
U.S. Navy Naval Aircraft Factory PN-11, BuNo A-7527, delivered 26 October 1929, catches fire at NAS Anacostia, Washington, D.C., and is destroyed after only 13:06 flight hours.
29 November
Bristol Type 101, a single-bay, biplane two-seat fighter design powered by a 450 hp Bristol Jupiter VI, and later, VIA radial engine, is rejected outright by the Air Ministry due to its all-wooden construction. Continued as a private venture, it first flies at Filton on 8 August 1927, piloted by Cyril Uwins, registered G-EBOW. With the VIA powerplant, Uwins achieves second place in the 1928 King's Cup race at an average speed of 159.9 mph. Subsequently used as a company hack and as a test bed for the 485 hp Bristol Mercury II nine-cylinder radial, it suffers wing centre section failure on this date while being subjected to engine overspeeding tests, the pilot, C. R. I. Shaw, bailing out successfully. This was the last wooden fighter built by the Bristol Aeroplane Company.
4 December
Curtiss B-2 Condor, 29-28, assigned to the 96th Bomb Squadron, Langley Field, Virginia, crashes at Goodwater, Alabama, with 69 total flight hours on airframe. Pilots 2nd Lt. James M. Gillespie and Ernest G. Schmidt KWF. This was the second of four crashes of the 13 total B-2s the USAAC acquired.

== 1930 ==
8 January
Two Avro 504 aircraft of No. 4 Flying Training School RAF collide in flight near RAF Abu Sueir, Egypt, killing all four occupants.
24 February
Replacement second prototype Parnall Pipit, N233, also suffers failure of tail unit in flight, this time losing both fin and rudder, Martlesham test pilot Sqn. Ldr. Sydney Leo Gregory Pope (DFC, AFC) bails out at under 1,000 feet over the Parnall Yate airfield, successfully parachuting down. Flutter of rudder due to heavy tail lamp in its trailing edge which both counteracted the large horn balance as well as substantially increased the moment of inertia about an unsupported hinge tube is cause, exacerbated by a lack of rigidity in the rear fuselage. Air Ministry regards the Pipit as wholly unacceptable, and this will represent the Parnall firm's last attempt to produce an effective fighter design.
3 March
Ford C-9, 29-221, c/n 81, assigned to the AC Detachment, Bolling Field, Washington, D.C., piloted by Newton Longfellow, suffers damage in taxi accident in which it went up on its nose at Mitchel Field, New York.
18 March
Sole Vought XO-28, 29-323, a U.S. Navy Vought O2U-3 Corsair taken on charge by USAAC for evaluation. To Wright Field, Ohio, with Project Number 'P-547'. Destroyed in a hangar fire at Wright Field this date. Joe Baugher notes that the USAAC record card does not mention any former Navy identity.
24 March
RAF Vickers Virginia Mk X J7709 of 58 Squadron is written off in a crash at RAF Worthy Down, Hampshire.
Mid-April
The prototype Hawker Hornet, J9682, crashes near Chichester while testing with No. 1 (Fighter) Squadron at RAF Tangmere when it loses its upper wing after a mid-air collision with an Armstrong Whitworth Siskin of No. 43 Squadron.

22 April
Lt. Irvin A. Woodring, of the 95th Pursuit Squadron, the last surviving member of the Three Musketeers Air Corps demonstration team, while simulating combat with Capt. Hugh M. Elmendorf, commanding officer of the 95th, in view of thousands of spectators at the Army Air Corps Maneuvers at Mather Field, California, finds his Boeing P-12B, 29-436, c/n 1186, uncontrollable and bails out as it spins in. "While his ship was falling, and Lieut. Woodring was bailing out, Lieut. Hayden P. Roberts, flying a transmitting plane a short distance away, watched Lieut. Woodring jump, drew a sketch of the field and marked the spot where pilot and ship landed. This was immediately transmitted to the ground station by means of the Westinghouse electrical invention which was being tested by the Army at that time." Ironically, both Elmendorf and Irvin will die, one week apart, in crashes of prototypes of the Consolidated P-30 in January 1933.

7 May
Curtiss B-2 Condor, 29–30, of the 11th Bomb Squadron, 7th Bombardment Group, is wrecked at Rockwell Field, San Diego, California, but is repaired and serves until it is surveyed in December 1933. This was third accident involving the 13 total B-2 Condors acquired by the Air Corps.
30 June
U.S. Navy Douglas PD-1 flying boat, BuNo A-7989, of VP-6 in the Hawaiian Islands, is lost in the Pacific off Hawaii, only six months after delivery. Airframe had only 42:40 hrs. flight time.
15 July
1st Lt. Frank Benjamin Tyndall (1894–1930) is killed in a crash of a Curtiss P-1F Hawk, 28–61, out of Langley Field, Virginia, near Mooresville, North Carolina. Lieutenant Tyndall was a World War I pilot, Silver Star recipient, and commander of the 22d Aero Squadron. Lieutenant Tyndall shot down four enemy airplanes in combat over France during World War I. Tyndall Field, Florida, opened on 13 January 1941 as a gunnery range, is named for him. With the establishment of the United States Air Force in 1947, the facility was renamed Tyndall Air Force Base on 13 January 1948. Tyndall was the second Air Service pilot to survive by parachuting, when his MB-3A broke up on 11 November 1922 over the Boeing factory, Seattle, Washington.
16 July
"MANAGUA, Nicaragua, July 17. – (AP) – Walter Lee Pounders, U. S. Marine gunner and pilot, and Chalmers Lewis Martin, U. S. Marine aerologist, were killed while making an aerological flight 10 miles south of Managua yesterday. Pounders came from Colt, Arkansas, and his next of kin was given as his brother, James S. Pounders. Martin came from Barlow, Ohio. His next of kin was given as his mother, Mrs. Sadie Martin. The cause of the accident was not known here."

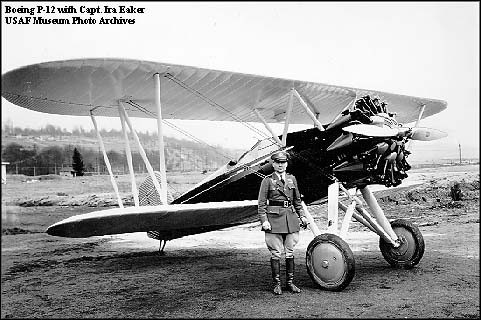
Captain Ira Eaker with a Boeing P-12.

18 August
Capt. Ira C. Eaker takes Boeing P-12B, 29-441, c/n 1189, of the AC Detachment, Bolling Field, Washington, D.C., up for tests to see how the ship handles with 70 lbs. of ballast – the weight of period radios and their battery – loaded behind the cockpit. After initiating a spin to the right from 7,000 feet, the fighter enters a flat spin which no control inputs can stop. Eaker bails out at low altitude, skinning his nose and leg as he strikes the stabilizer, but his partially opened chute fetches up on the steep roof of a house with the pilot going over the other side, breaking his fall somewhat. He suffers an injured foot when he slams into a concrete stoop, but survives. The P-12 destroys a henhouse and burns in an apple orchard.

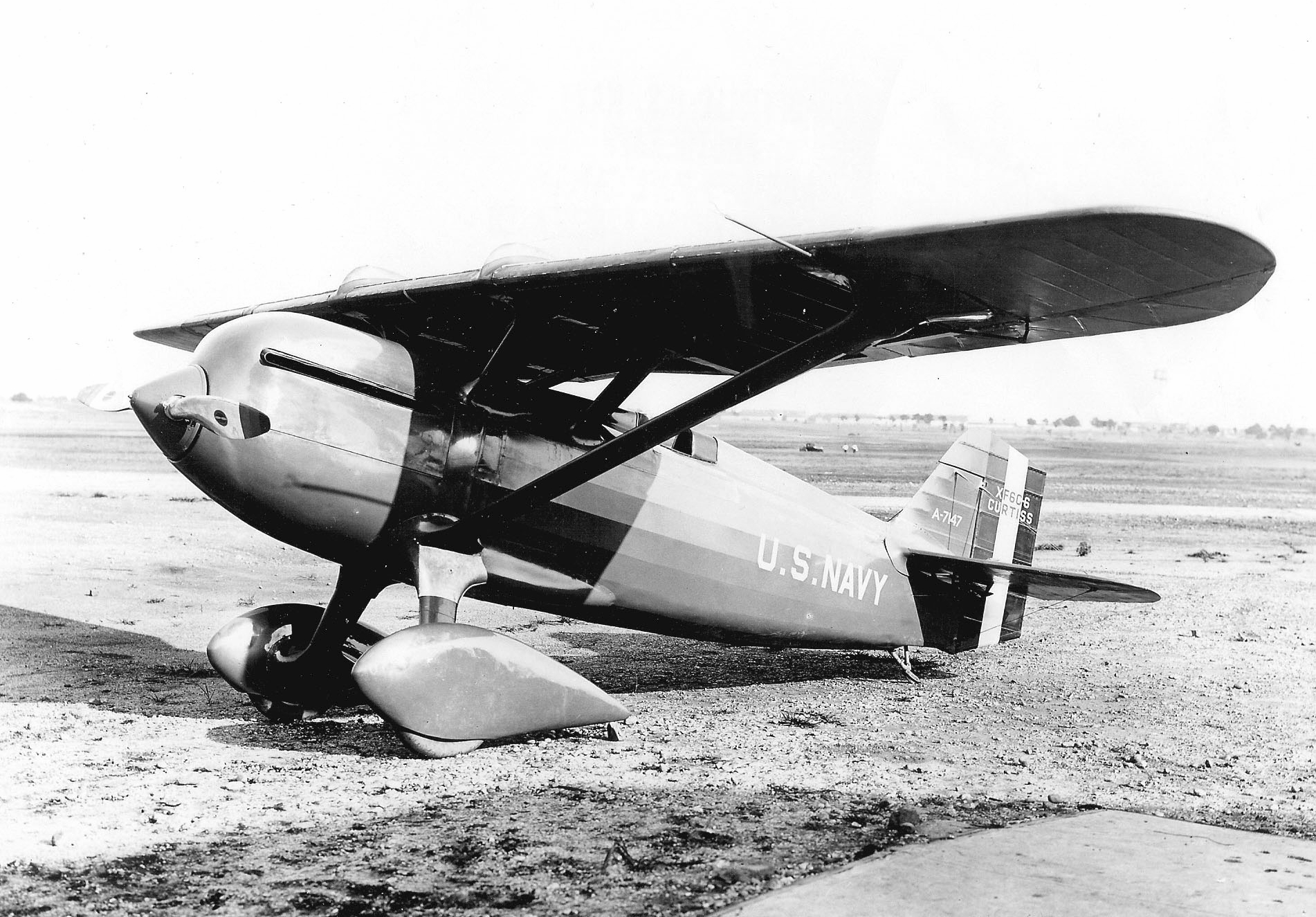
The XF6C-6, lost 1 September 1930.

1 September
Curtiss XF6C-6 racer, A-7147, crashes during the Thompson Trophy race in Chicago, Illinois, killing U.S. Marine Corps pilot Capt. Arthur H. Page. The only military entry, Page gained and increased an early lead but on the 17th of 20 laps, crashed to his death, a victim of carbon monoxide poisoning. The Marine flying field at Parris Island, South Carolina, is named Page Field in his honor.
7 September
Capt. John Owen Donaldson, World War I ace (eight victories), after winning two races at an American Legion air meet in Philadelphia, is killed when his plane crashes during a stunt-flying performance. He had shared the MacKay Gold Medal for taking first place in the Army's transcontinental air race in October 1919. Greenville Army Air Field, South Carolina, is later renamed Donaldson Air Force Base for the Greenville native.

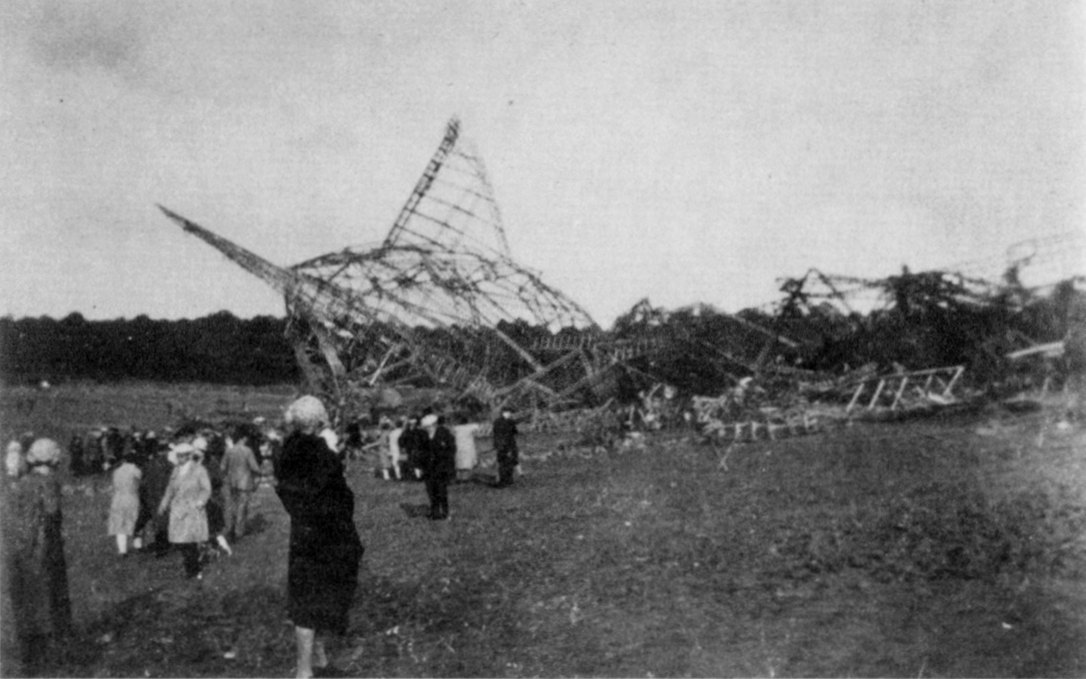
The wreckage of R101.

5 October
British rigid airship R101, G-FAAW, completed in 1929 as part of the Imperial Airship Scheme. After initial flights and two enlargements to the lifting volume, it crashed this date, in Beauvais, France, during its maiden overseas voyage, killing 48. Amongst airship accidents of the 1930s, the loss of life surpassed the LZ 129 Hindenburg, disaster of 1937, and was second only to that of the USS Akron ZRS-4, crash of 1933. The demise of R101 effectively ended British employment of rigid airships; the girders of the comparatively successful R100 were destroyed by steamroller, and sold for scrap.

29 December
"On Dec. 29th, the word was received that Lieut. W.H. Sherwood of this squadron, (16th Reconnaissance Squadron) who was on an extended cross-country to his home in Pennsylvania, crashed and was killed near Waterford, Penna., about a quarter of a mile from his parents' home. Lieut. Sherwood was a graduate of Kelly Field, Texas, with the July, 1929 class." Lt. William H. Sherwood, assigned at Marshall Field, Fort Riley, Kansas, had departed Rodgers Field, Pittsburgh's first municipal airport, in Douglas O-25A, 30-186.

== 1931 ==
18 January
"Electrical trouble in the insulation of their D.H. plane developing suddenly and without warning almost proved the deaths of two Brooks Field officers, Major C. E. Baker, Surgeon, and Lieut. Richard E. Cobb, Supply Officer, 52nd School Squadron, on Saturday, January 18th, as the two officers were making a cross-country flight from Brooks Field to Matagorda Island for the week end. Smoke pouring from the overheated insulation wiring first gave indication of serious mechanical trouble, and Lieut. Cobb, the pilot, hastened to land. Blinded and almost overcome by smoke, however, he was unable to make a proper landing, and the airplane crashed to the ground, rendering his passenger and himself unconscious. To aggravate a situation already precarious, the gasoline tank developed a leak shortly after the plane had landed. When Major Baker and Lieut. Cobb regained consciousness, they found that had another five minutes elapsed, they would have become trapped in the flames that completely consumed the airplane. Major Baker sustained a badly lacerated forehead, and Lieut. Cobb a wrenched back. Officers of Brooks Field who investigated the accident were unable to determine the source of the electrical trouble." Aeromarine DH-4M-2T, 22-1142, was destroyed. Joe Baugher and the Aviation Archeology sites both list the accident date as 17 January.

4 February
The first of three Blackburn Iris III flying boats, S238, of No. 209 Squadron RAF, based at RAF Mount Batten, crashes into the waters of Batten Bay, Plymouth Sound, Devon, U.K., while on firing practice, when the mirror-flat surface causes the pilot to misjudge his landing approach with the result that the three-engined biplane strikes the water, explodes and sinks. Nine of twelve aboard are killed, including Wing Commander C. G. Acker, "who had a splendid war record." Flying Officer F. K. Wood is recovered alive but dies soon afterward of his injuries. Lt. M. H. Ely is rescued with serious injuries, while Flying Officer C. Ryley is not badly hurt. Of eight enlisted men aboard, all but one were missing and assumed trapped in the overturned hull. Corporal W. M. Barry was unhurt. Divers are sent down to try to recover the bodies.
7 February
Sole Boeing XP-15, (Boeing Model 202), NX270V, c/n 1151, accepted by the U.S.Army for testing at Wright Field but never actually purchased, so no USAAC serial, suffers propeller blade failure during a high-speed dash, unbalanced engine tears from mounts.
28 February
The sole Vought XO4U-1, BuNo A-8641, first flown in February 1931, crashes this date, when test pilot Carl Harper is unable to recover from a spin. Initially trapped in the cockpit by the inertia of the spin, he escapes to parachute safely as the airframe comes down.
6 March
Following landing trials on a simulated carrier deck at NAS Norfolk, Virginia, the sole Vought XF2U-1, BuNo A-7692, was turned over to the Naval Aircraft Factory at Philadelphia, where it operated from Mustin Field until it was damaged in a crash landing this date and struck off charge the same month.
10 March
Lockheed Y1C-17, 31-408, Vega Model DL1B Special, c/n 159, assigned at Bolling Field, Washington, D.C., cracks up during forced landing at Tolu, Kentucky during attempted transcontinental record flight by Capt. Ira C. Eaker, pilot unhurt. Specially rigged gas lines had leaked air which shut off fuel flow to engine. Wreckage taken to Wright Field, Ohio, scrapped 22 April 1931. Was the fastest USAAC aircraft of its time at 221 mph. Total airframe flight time 33 hours.
15 April
Keystone XOK-1, BuNo A-8357, disintegrates in dive during tests this date, during a demonstration before naval officials when a piece of its NACA-style engine cowling detached itself, smashed into the wings and tailplane, causing the airframe to break up in flight. Although the test pilot successfully bailed out, with the Berliner-Joyce XOJ-1 and Vought XO4U-1 (built to a slightly different specification) nearly ready for trials, BuAer decided to discontinue XOK-1 development. Sole example of Keystone-built variant of BuAero design no. 86 for a light-weight observation biplane, 40 of which were built by Berliner-Joyce Aircraft as the XOJ-1 or OJ-2.

17 April
The second of two Westland Westbury twin-engine test bed fighter prototypes, J7766, retrofitted with Bristol Jupiter VIII engines with reduction gearing, suffers engine-start accident at Martlesham Heath this date. With Hucks starter turning over engine, with the throttle accidentally wide open, the aircraft suddenly jumps the chocks and collides with the Hucks vehicle, being damaged beyond economical repair: struck off charge.
5 May
A Royal Air Force Hawker Horsley fitted with a non-standard engine for tests crashed at Farnborough when the pilot Richard Waghorn lost control. Waghorn died two days later from his injuries.
9 May
Hawker Hart light bomber prototype, J9052, modified as a naval fleet spotter-cum-fighter Hawker Osprey to Specification O.22/26, returned to Hawker after trials, is wrecked this date at Brooklands in take off accident with crossed aileron controls. Pilot Gerry Sayer survives, Orders for 133 are placed, in four Marks, serving in operational units until May 1939, as well as small orders for Portugal, Spain and Sweden.

22 May
Two Consolidated PT-3 trainers, of the 53d School Squadron, collide in mid-air near March Field, California, causing one to crash, killing one crew. "Ralph A. Murphy, second lieutenant of the air corps stationed at March field, [sic] and Cadet Lawrence Welch, student pilot, seriously hurt yesterday (22 May) when the army training plane in which they were riding crashed at the Riverside county [sic] air base yesterday. Lieutenant Murphy died while arrangements were being made to rush him by air to the Letterman hospital in San Francisco. During a training flight the wing of another airplane touched Murphy's ship, a training type biplane, and it nose-dived to earth from 500 feet. Lieutenant Murphy was the son of Mr. and Mrs. William Murphy of Kansas City. He was a graduate of the University of Missouri and entered the air service several year ago at Brooks field, [sic] San Antonio. The student pilot's home address is East Chicago, Ind." Murphy and Welch were flying in PT-3, 28-230, when they were struck by PT-3, 28-251, flown by Lewis J. Connors, 1¾ mi SE of March Field.

27 May
Second prototype, of three, Gloster Gorcocks, J7502, experimental single-seat, single-bay biplane interceptor, first delivered to the Royal Aircraft Establishment in 1928, written off in a landing crash at Farnborough this date.
25 September
Douglas O-38B, 31-427, piloted by Lt. Robert Richard, collides in midair with another plane in a flight of three from March Field, Riverside, California, to Crissy Field, San Francisco. Richard and observer Pvt. Ralph Farrington bail out as the plane breaks up and are rescued by the other plane in the collision, undamaged, which lands safely 15 mi SE of Mendota, California. The remaining two planes reach San Francisco without incident.
9 October
U.S. Navy Keystone PK-1 flying boat, BuNo A-8516, is forced down in heavy seas and sinks.
19 October
Sole Lockheed-Detroit YP-24, 32–320, crashes during tests at Wright Field, Ohio. During evaluation flight, landing gear extension system fails with gear only partly deployed when in-cockpit crank handle breaks off. Through a series of violent maneuvers, test pilot Lt. Harrison Crocker managed to get the gear retracted and was planning to attempt a belly-landing, but upon orders from the ground, sent aloft written on the sides of Boeing P-12D And Douglas O-25C aircraft, he bails out. Four Y1P-24 pre-production models cancelled due to Detroit Aircraft's shaky financial situation. Two will be built as Consolidated Y1P-25s after Detroit's chief designer Robert Wood joins that firm. Second Y1P-25 completed with a supercharger as Y1A-11.
14 December
RAF pilot Douglas Bader (21 February 1910 – 5 September 1982), undertaking a low-level roll in Bristol Bulldog Mk. IIA, K1676, of 23 Squadron at RAF Woodley, Great Britain, hooks a wingtip, rolls the biplane into a ball, and loses both his legs. Undeterred, he returns to the air and becomes a renowned World War II fighter pilot with 22 credited "kills" before being downed over France, 9 August 1941. As a POW, he has such determination to escape that he is eventually sent to Colditz Castle for recidivist escapees.
17 December
Boeing P-12C, 31-164, of the 17th Pursuit Squadron, Selfridge Field, Michigan, has midair collision with Consolidated PT-3A, 29–115, of the same unit, 2 miles W of New Baltimore, Michigan, this date. Lawrence W. Koons in the P-12 and Charles M. Wilson in the PT-3 are both KWF. The trainer had previously been assigned at Wright Field, Ohio, as the sole XPT-8A, project number 'P-564', converted with a 220 h.p. Packard DR-980 diesel engine, but was restored to PT-3A configuration.

== 1932 ==
11 January
Great Lakes TG-1, BuNo A-8469, of VT-2B, USS Saratoga, on approach to Border Airport, San Ysidro, California, crashes at ~0850 hrs., killing Chief Aviation Pilot Clarence Martin Carter, and injuring Chief Aviation Pilot Robert T. Thompson.
1 February
"An army airplane with William A. Cocke Jr. and Edward D. Hoffman aboard left Crissy field in San Francisco for Los Angeles Monday and the plane and Hoffman vanished in a storm. Cocke jumped to safety with a parachute and was found by Sequoia National park rangers." They were flying in Douglas O-25C, 32-182, of the 91st Observation Squadron. "Lieutenant William A. Cocke Jr., who 'bailed-out' of the army bombing plane [sic] with Hoffman, fell in his parachute from an altitude of 13,000 feet through a blinding snow storm and landed, rangers said, on the only safe spot in Sequoia National park. Cocke said he believed Hoffman went on toward Hockett meadow, an isolated spot, 9,000 feet in altitude, about 50 miles east of Visalia." The action code for this accident is Killed- bailed out due to weather. Cocke will go on to set a glider duration record of 21 hours, 34 minutes.

29 April
Fairchild Y1C-24, 32-289, c/n 6709, of Headquarters Flight, one of four Pilgrim Model 100-Bs acquired by the USAAC and used as an air ambulance into the late 1930s, piloted by James R. Williams, is moderately damaged in a ground loop on landing at Langley Field, Virginia. Repaired, it will later be wrecked 5 miles SE of Front Royal, Virginia on 28 January 1937.

30 April
Douglas BT-2B, 31-51, an hour into a 1500 hrs. local flight out of Chicago Municipal Airport, Chicago, Illinois, suffers engine failure. Lts. Charles H. Fargo and Henry C. Sandusky try to make for open ground behind the car barns at 77th Street and Vincennes Avenue, but stay with the plane as they are over a densely populated area instead of bailing out when it becomes obvious that the glide will be short. The plane strikes a Surface Lines trolley wire on Michigan Avenue, glances off the roof of a laundry truck (whose driver leapt out uninjured) and struck the porch of a two flat house at 174 East 75th Street. The plane and house burn and both crew are killed. Six escape from the house but one man is burned when he returns inside to retrieve hidden money. The plane had departed from the 32d Division hangar, Illinois National Guard, at the Municipal Airport, and although pre-flight showed no problems, the fuel feed line apparently failed as witnesses reported seeing gas streaming from the plane before the crash. Lt. Fargo was a Chicago native whose family is well known in society, while Lt. Sandusky was a wartime combat pilot and a salesman for an automobile concern.

10 May
Sole Lockheed Y1C-12 Vega, 31-405, c/n 158, of the 59th Service Squadron, a Lockheed DL-1 Vega acquired by the Army Air Corps for service tests and evaluation, is moderately damaged at Langley Field, Virginia, while piloted by Thomas D. Ferguson. Aircraft eventually scrapped at Langley Field on 16 May 1935.

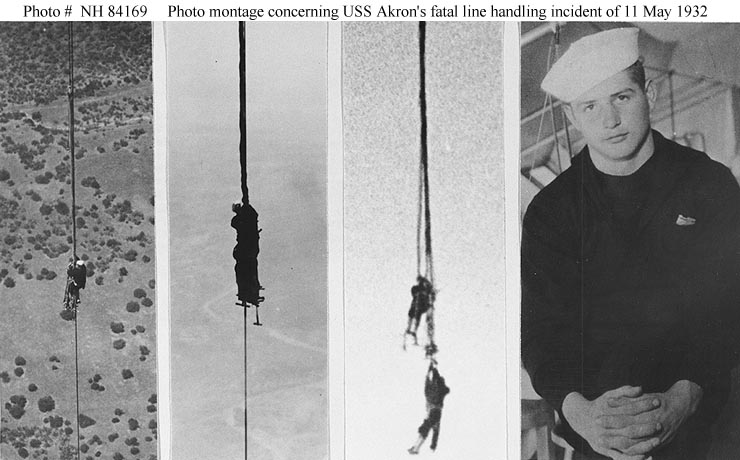
Stills from 11 May 1932 mooring incident: the two pictures on the left and picture at far right are of Seaman Cowart; the picture 2nd from right shows Henton and Edsall before their fatal fall.

11 May
The USS Akron, arriving at Camp Kearny, San Diego, California, after a cross-continent transit attempts to moor, but proves too buoyant. The mooring cable is cut to avert a catastrophic nose-stand by the airship and the Akron heads up. Most men of the mooring crew, predominantly "boot" seamen from the Naval Training Station San Diego, let go of their lines but three do not. One man was carried 15 feet (4.6 m) into the air before he let go and suffered a broken arm in the process while three others were carried up even farther. Two of these men — Aviation Carpenter's Mate 3d Class Robert H. Edsall and Apprentice Seaman Nigel M. Henton — lost their grips and fell to their deaths. The third, Apprentice Seaman C. M. "Bud" Cowart, clung desperately to his line and made himself fast to it before he was hoisted aboard the Akron one hour later. Akron managed to moor at Camp Kearny later that day. The stranded crewman provides the template for the very first rescue by George Reeves' portrayal of Superman in the first television episode of "Adventures of Superman", "Superman on Earth", first aired 19 September 1952.
June
Lockheed Y1C-25, 32-393, Altair Model 8A c/n 153, NR119W. First Lockheed to be equipped with fully retractable landing gear. Struck off charge after belly landing at Wright Field, Ohio. Hulk destroyed in tests of bottled carbon dioxide fire extinguishers at Wright Field, 27 September 1932.
15 July
Sole prototype low-wing monoplane Vickers Type 171 Jockey, J9122, is lost during spinning trials at Martlesham Heath when it enters a flat spin, crashing at Woodbridge, Suffolk, pilot successfully bailing out at 5,000 feet.

24 October
"PENSACOLA, Fla., Oct. 24 - Lieut. John Wehle, marine corps student flier and son-in-law of Major-Gen. Smedley D. Butler, joined the 'caterpillar club' today by leaping safely in a parachute after his airplane went out of control. Wehle, who was practicing barrel rolling when he lost control, landed in a bayou. The plane crashed on the edge of Pensacola bay [sic]."

27 October
"SAN DIEGO, Oct. 27 - A stirring and unique air drama was played out in an impenetrable fog here tonight after 22 navy airplanes had been stranded with dwindling gasoline supplies in the sky, and at its conclusion every aviator involved was safe. As a result of the long series of emergencies which developed as the fuel ran dangerously low in the planes, one at a time, one plane was demolished, another was badly damaged, one caught fire and several others turned over and were slightly damaged. At 8 o'clock only two planes remained aloft, and they circled aimlessly about over the city watching for a break in the fog. They carried no radios and could not be told that the navy's call upon the citizens of San Diego for assistance had sent scores of motorists rushing to Camp Kearny mesa to light up with the headlights of their cars an unused airport there. The United Airlines night mail plane, piloted by C. F. Sullivan, was en route from Los Angeles to San Diego. It carried a radio-telephone. At the request of the navy, Sullivan was asked to fly around above the fog, locate the two planes and lead them to Camp Kearny. He circled the town several times, picked up the first one and then the other of the planes and by flashing three dots and a dash with his cabin light informed them they were to follow him. The three in this strange cavalcade reached the abandoned army camp and landed there in safety amidst cheers of several hundreds of persons."

13 November
"SAN ANTONIO, Texas, Nov. 14 - Lt. Walter Andrew Oglesby, 23, eighth attack squadron, was instantly killed yesterday when the landing gear of his airplane caught on a high tension wire as he flew near Randolph field here. The plane was demolished. Oglesby's home is in Charlotte, S. C. [sic]." Curtiss A-3B Falcon, 30-14, out of Fort Crockett, Texas, crashed 10 miles E of San Antonio.

15 November
On first flight of United States Navy Hall XP2H-1 four-engine flying boat, BuNo A-8729, it noses straight up on take-off due to incorrectly rigged stabilizer; test pilot Bill McAvoy and aircraft's designer Charles Ward Hall Sr. manage to chop throttles, plane settles back, suffering only minor damage. Incident occurred at NAS Anacostia, Washington, D.C.. This sole prototype was the largest four-engine biplane the U.S. Navy ever procured, with a wingspan of 112 feet.
26 November
One of two Nakajima Navy Experimental Kusho 6-shi Special Bomber (6-shi Tokushu Bakugekiki- 6-Shi {1931} Special Bomber/Dive Bomber) prototypes, the first carrier-based dive bomber design in Japan, crashes in a rural area, killing Nakajima test pilot Tsuneo Fujimaki. Observers reported that the pilot made several attempted recoveries but each time the nose pitched down to vertical. Impact is said have driven the airframe two metres into the ground. Further evaluation of the type is suspended. For security purposes, the term "dive-bomber" was not used, the design being described as a "special bomber".
16 December
During a routine practice flight, Capt. J. L. Grisham flying Fokker Y1O-27, 31-599, '2', of the 30th Bombardment Squadron, is unable to get the port main undercarriage leg to extend more than one-quarter down, makes emergency landing in San Diego Bay off of NAS San Diego, California. He and Sgt. Clarence J. King survive, aircraft salvaged, repaired and returned to service.

== 1933 ==
8 January
Kawanishi H3K1 flying boat, the largest design in the Pacific at the time, crashes while alighting at night at Tateyama on a training flight, cause given as a slow-reading altimeter. Noted naval aviator Lt. Cmdr. Shinzo Shin killed, as are two more of nine crew.
13 January
The sole Consolidated Y1P-25, 32-321, crashes during flight testing at Wright Field, Ohio, killing Captain Hugh M. Elmendorf due to a stall/spin. Elmendorf Air Force Base, Alaska, is named for him.
20 January
The sole prototype Consolidated XA-11 attack plane, 32-322, breaks up in midair over Wright Field, killing Lieut. Irvin A. Woodring. Woodring was the last surviving member of The Three Musketeers Air Corps demonstration team.

9 March
Lt. Roy H. Linn, flying Boeing P-12F, 32-98, of the 73d Pursuit Squadron, out of March Field, California, in formation with other fighters of that unit, suffers engine failure and bails out above Cajon Pass, N of San Bernardino. His chute only has time to partly inflate and he receives severe injuries when he lands on a rocky slope of a "rough canyon" a mile S of the summit. "The plane, falling in wide spirals, narrowly missed the highway as it crashed into the underbrush. Motorists, watching it lose altitude, stopped their cars a distance away so they would not be in its path if it landed on the road. Other members of Linn's squadron flew low over the pass after the crash, but were unable to land because of the uneven ground. A passing motorist rushed the aviator to Victorville, where he was given emergency treatment then taken to March field [sic] in an army ambulance. Although painfully injured, he is expected to recover." Linn suffers a broken collarbone and possible internal injuries. The P-12 is demolished. The Aviation Archeology website incorrectly spells the pilot's name Roy H. Lynn.

3 April
United States Navy airship USS Akron encounters severe weather and crashes into the Atlantic off the coast of New Jersey. Without lifejackets and only one raft aboard, 73 of 75 passengers and crew, including Rear Admiral William A. Moffett, are killed. The Akron's Curtiss F9C Sparrowhawks were not deployed aboard at the time. The new Naval Airship Station at Sunnyvale, California is named Moffett Field in honour of the lost admiral.
4 April
The French dirigible E-9 is forced down in France, injuring two.
4 April
U.S. Navy airship J-3, A7382, sent out from NAS Lakehurst to search for USS Akron survivors, experiences engine failure, ditches in the surf of the New Jersey shore. Two crew lose their lives. "Flying to the scene [of the Akron crash], off New Jersey, the U. S. Navy non-rigid airship J-3 also fell into the ocean. Five of the crew of seven were rescued but the commander, found in the sea, died later and the body of a member of the crew was recovered. A photograph taken from an airplane by an Associated Press photographer shows the submerged envelope close to shore with only the rear quarter of the ship with cruciform tailfins still holding gas and above water.

14 April
"Jumping from their planes as they crashed in mid-air over Hemet, two March field [sic] aviators parachuted to safety yesterday (14 April) as their planes plunged to earth and smashed to ruins. The two fliers were Lieuts. C. M. McHenry of Upland and Vincent Ford of Alhambra. McHenry was unhurt, but Ford suffered a broken leg as the propellor [sic] of the other plane struck him. Despite the injury, he was able to jump from the ship and parachute to safety from an altitude of 1,500 feet. The planes, their pilots members of the seventeenth pursuit squadron, were flying in formation about five miles south of the army air base, when high winds apparently blew them together. With wings locked, the ships began plunging to earth. Both pilots 'bailed out' as the craft began their wild descent and plunged to earth. Ford was rushed to the base hospital, where his condition was described as 'satisfactory' by physicians. Last night he was moved to Letterman's hospital, San Francisco. McHenry and Ford were both experienced pilots, with many hours in the air to their credit." Charles M. McHenry was flying Boeing P-12D, 31-251, and Ford was piloting P-12D, 31-272. The Aviation Archeology website lists the aircraft as being from the 34th Pursuit Squadron, and the crash site as being ten miles SW of March Field.

23 April
"SANTA ROSA, April 23 - An Army aviator, Lieut. S. A. Beck, 27, of Crissy field [sic], and a woman companion, Miss Marjorie Patricia Hughes, 24, San Francisco, were killed as an airplane in which they were flying crashed near here today. The plane, an army observation craft, struck some high tension wires after the motor had apparently failed, witnesses said, ripped apart and clattered to the ground. Wreckage was scattered over a considerable distance. Lieutenant Beck, Oklahoma Baptist college [sic] graduate, whose father resides in Burbank, and Miss Hughes were found dead in the wreckage." Lt. Stephen A. Beck was flying Douglas O-25C, 32-183, c/n 1006, of the 91st Observation Squadron, out of Crissy Field.

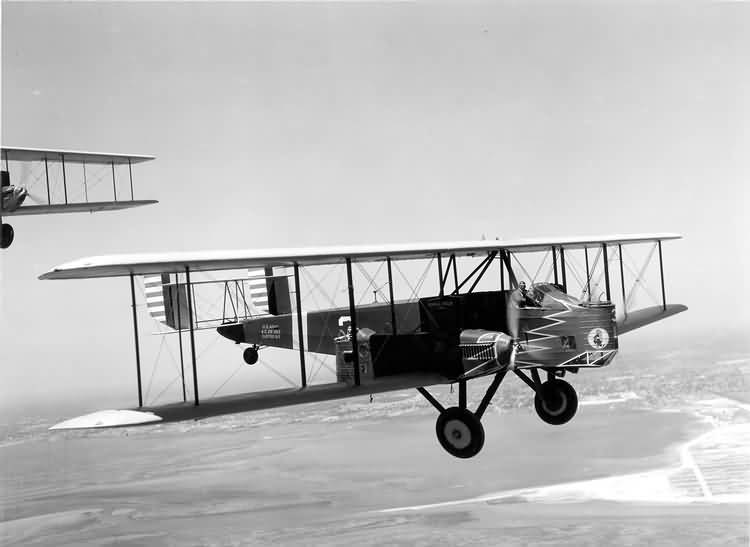
Curtiss B-2 Condors of the 11th Bombardment Squadron, wearing the Jiggs with a bomb insignia.

31 May
Curtiss B-2 Condor, 29-36, of the 11th Bombardment Squadron, en route from Dayton, Ohio, to March Field, California, suffers failure of one engine and is forced down two miles SE of Abilene, Texas. The Associated Press report states, "Five army aviators, en route to March field [sic], California, from Dayton, Ohio, narrowly escaped injury when their giant bomber cracked up near here (Abilene) today. The pilot was attempting to reach the Abilene airport after one of the ship's motors had cut out. The bomber lost altitude rapidly, however, and in a forced landing the right wing was clipped by a wire. A power line fell across a barbed wire fence, charging it, and a workman, running toward the plane, was slightly burned. The fliers, attached to the eleventh bombardment squadron, were Lieutenants Charles H. Howard, pilot, and John F. Mills, co-pilot; Sergeants Cecil M. Kilheffer, Harold Cooper and S. Patterson. The bomber, considerably damaged, will be dismantled and shipped to California." The Aviation Archeology website lists the co-pilot as John S. Mills. The B-2, which was delivered on 4 January 1930, will be repaired and will be surveyed at the Aberdeen Proving Ground, Maryland, on 22 July 1936.

1 June
Fokker C-14, 31-388, tail number '2', of the 64th Service Squadron, out of March Field, California, attempting morning flight from Riverside at 0820 hrs. to Crissy Field, San Francisco, with seven aboard, finds heavy fog in Cajon Pass, and crashes just below the summit, pancaking when the pilot hooks a wingtip in the underbrush while turning to avoid rising ground. Three soldiers in the passenger compartment are killed on impact and three hurt, two critically. Pilot Lt. Charles M. McHenry was following the line of the Atchison, Topeka and Santa Fe Railroad up the pass with almost no visibility in "blinding fog" but just a few hundred feet short of the ridge top he was unable to lift the loaded transport sufficiently and the plane crashed at 0850 hrs. Killed are Pvt. Charles M. Leadbetter, of Roseburg, Oregon; Pvt. Lawrence D. Romano, Syracuse, New York; and Pvt. Addison C. Spencer, Charleroi, Pennsylvania. Injured are Lt. Edward D. Kennedy, Kansas City, Missouri, broken leg and severe internal injuries; Sgt. S. R. Decker, Elmira, New York, broken leg and internal injuries; and Pvt. Paul L. Blinka, Alice, Texas, broken arm and internal injuries. Lt. McHenry, flying the plane from an open cockpit above the fuselage, was not seriously injured and was able to climb down and make his way to the National Old Trails highway where he flagged down motorists. They notified officers at the U. S. civilian corps camp at Cajon who then alerted March Field officials of the accident. Physicians "despaired of the lives of Kennedy and Decker." Lt. McHenry was one of the pilots involved in a P-12 mid-air collision over Hemet on 14 April 1933.
25 June
Boeing Y1B-9A, 32-307, c/n 1675, '190', of the 49th Bombardment Squadron, departs Logan Field, Baltimore, Maryland at 2020 hrs. on routine night training mission to Langley Field, Virginia, but experience difficulties at ~2200 hrs., attempts crash landing in the James River ~one mile from Rushmere Island. Bomber strikes water nose first, breaks in half, sinks, killing four crew including pilot 2nd Lt. Lewis Horvath and co-pilot H. W. Macklean. Joe Baugher cites crash date of 24 June.
July
First prototype of two Mitsubishi 1MF10, (Mitsubishi Navy Experimental 7-Shi Carrier Fighter), completed at the end of February 1933, crashes on test flight out of Kagamigahara due to structural failure of vertical fin. Mitsubishi test pilot Yoshitaka Kajima successfully bails out.

25 July
March Field, California, suffers its worst accident to date when Sikorsky C-6A amphibian, 30-399, of the 64th Service Squadron, en route from Riverside to Rockwell Field, San Diego, sheds the starboard wing in flight when a wing strut fails and crashes in a hollow on the edge of the city limits of Oceanside, killing all seven aboard. Although the wreckage and mangled bodies are drenched in gasoline after the crash, the pilot apparently shut off the switches before impact and there is no fire. Dead are pilot Lt. Carl H. Murray, 29, of Filer, Idaho, attached to the 17th Pursuit Group headquarters at March Field; Sgts. Archie W. Snodgrass, San Antonio, Texas, and Bonnell L. Herrick, Warsaw, Indiana; Cpl. Walter T. Taylor, Los Angeles; Pvts. Stanley Book, Detroit, Michigan, Albert Overend, Coronado, California, and Vincent J. Galdin, Grand Rapids, Michigan. The flight departed March at 1140 hrs. and was sighted over Oceanside a half hour later at an altitude of 3,000 feet when the wing tore loose. The separated wing floated down a half mile from the main wreck which impacted in the pasture of the N. W. Glasco property. March Field investigators "said that they believed the wing had broken off in such a manner that it blocked the hatchway and imprisoned the passengers within. Apparently none of them had attempted to use their parachutes." As a result of this accident, all remaining USAAC C-6s and C-6As are withdrawn from use and scrapped.

23 August
Three USAAC bombers of the 11th Bombardment Squadron, March Field, California, make a practice flight over the San Bernardino Valley with orders to make landings and takeoffs from the 70-acre sod Shandin Hills Airport in San Bernardino and then return to base. The first two do so without incident but as Keystone B-4A, 32-130, piloted by Lt. Kenneth P. Gardner, with five enlisted crew aboard, approaches the boundary at 0830 hrs., an "air pocket" causes the bomber to drop suddenly and the undercarriage is shorn off as the plane strikes an embankment on the edge of the field. "The pilot 'gunned' his motors, lifting the ship back into the air momentarily, and then settled down for a landing on the fuselage and the lower wings. The plane slid along for 100 yards before it stopped, its nose in the sand. The bomber did not overturn, a fact which probably saved the pilot and his crew from injury. The propellors [sic] were bent and the fuselage damaged. An army crew dismantled the ship at the field." The airframe was transported back to March Field on trucks.

9 October
Prototype Martin XB-10, 33–157, assigned to the 59th Service Squadron, Langley Field, Virginia, is lost when landing gear will not extend during routine flight, Lt. E. A. Hilary parachutes from bomber, which is destroyed with only 132 flight hours.
10 October
Fokker Y1O-27, 31-602, '3', of 30th Bombardment Squadron, Rockwell Field, California, en route from Burbank, California to Crissy Field, California, lands at Crissy with landing gear retracted. Both light and buzzer in cockpit that are supposed to activate when the throttles are retarded fail to function. Only serious damage is to the propellers but airframe is surveyed and dropped from inventory with 115 hours, 15 minutes flying time. Pilot 2nd Lt. Theodore B. Anderson uninjured.

13 October
Douglas B-7, 32-310, c/n 1110 of the 11th Bombardment Squadron, departs March Field, California, piloted by Lt. Kenneth P. Gardner. A few minutes into the flight, a gasoline fire begins in the port engine carburetor and as it spreads, Lt. Gardner orders Sgt. James E. Carter and Pvt. D. Russell to bail out. The pilot attempts to stay with the plane to keep it from crashing into a populous area but when the blaze spreads, he, too, takes to his parachute. The burning bomber comes down at Azusa, California, and is destroyed. Carter is slightly bruised upon landing but the other two are unhurt. Gardner was the pilot of the B-4A that crushed its landing gear at San Bernardino on 23 August 1933.
19 October
Fokker Y1O-27, 31-601, '22', of the 32d Bombardment Squadron, Rockwell Field, California, during ferry flight from Rockwell to Brooks Field, Texas, pilot Capt. Albert F. Hegenberger, on leg between Tucson, Arizona and Midland, Texas, loses Prestone coolant out of starboard engine, engine temperature rises so he shuts it down. Forced down five miles short of Midland Airport, pilot does not get the landing gear completely locked down, collapses on touch down. Aircraft repaired.
3 November
First fatal accident involving a Fokker YO-27 occurs when pilot Lt. Lloyd E. Hunting with Sgt. John J. Cunningham aboard, departs Olmsted Field, Middletown Air Depot, Pennsylvania, in 31-589 of the 30th Bombardment Squadron at 1800 hrs. after darkness had fallen. Pilot had apparently not observed a mountain ridge, 400 to 800 feet (120 to 240 m) high, one mile from the airfield, when he landed during the afternoon, and upon departure did not see it in the dark, crashing head-on into the ridge, aircraft burned, both crew KWF.
21 November
The experimental oversized Kalinin K-7 crashes this date whilst on its eighth test flight due to structural failure of one of the tail booms. The accident killed 14 people aboard and one on the ground. Flight speculated that sabotage was suspected as the investigating committee had representation by the state security organization, the Joint State Political Directorate (OGPU).

== 1934 ==
23 January
"Diving into the ground at terrific speed, his plane out of control, a March field [sic] lieutenant was instantly killed yesterday (23 January) when his ship crashed in Moreno valley, a short distance from the Jackrabbit trail highway. The dead flier is John Patrick Donlin, 21 years old, of San Francisco. He was attached to the ninety-fifth army pursuit squadron at March field and was flying a light combat plane." Donlin was flying Boeing P-12D, 31-250, c/n 1364, of the 95th PS, when he came down nine miles E of March Field. "Army officials last night could shed little light on the circumstances surrounding Donlin's fatal plunge. The aviator was flying alone and no other pilots witnessed the crash. Nearby farmers said that Donlin was flying at a few hundred feet altitude, when his plane suddenly went into a dive. He struck at almost full speed, they declared, and died instantly. The plane did not catch fire. So quickly did the crash apparently occur that Donlin had no time to use his parachute. He was the son of Mrs. Patrick Donlin, 55 Morse street [sic], San Francisco, and a native of that city. A graduate of the University of California, Donlin entered Randolph field [sic], Texas, and from there went to Kelly field [sic], from which he graduated last June. He was assigned to March field as a reserve officer and would have completed active duty training and been retired on May 30."
14 February
First prototype Bulgarian DAR-3 Garvan ("Raven") (ДАР-3) two-seat biplane, first flown Autumn 1927 and rebuilt twice with different powerplants, written off this date in a fatal crash.(DAR – Derzhavna Aeroplanna Rabotilnitsa – State Airplane Workshop)
16 February
Crash of Curtiss A-12 Shrike, 33-244, in bad weather at Oakley, Utah, kills two crew, 2d Lt. Jean Donant Grenier, from Fort Crockett, Texas, and crewmate 2d Lt. Edwin D. White Jr., 23, attached to March Field, California, while flying an advance route to determine time and distance for carrying the mail between Salt Lake City and Cheyenne, Wyoming. Their plane came down in a canyon during a snowstorm. "The plane flown by the two men crashed in a blinding snow storm 60 miles east of Salt Lake in Summit county, 30 miles south of the Utah-Wyoming line." Orson Maxwell, a miner, found the crew dead in their cockpits shortly after 1700 hrs., near the head of the Weber River. They had departed the Salt Lake City airdrome at 0930 and army officers became concerned when their arrival at Cheyenne had not been reported by afternoon. "The first word of their fate was phoned to Salt Lake City by Orson Maxwell, miner, who drove in a sleigh from the scene of the crash to Oakley, several miles distant. The call was received here [March Field] about two hours after Maxwell discovered the bodies in the wrecked craft." "Search had already started for them when a telephone call form [sic] Kamas, Utah last night told of their fate." "Lieutenant White was a San Francisco resident and a University of California graduate." He entered the army flying service in 1931. He was trained at Randolph and Kelly fields. [sic] Lieutenant Grenier, who was reported to have been piloting the plane, was a resident of Manchester, New Hampshire, and a graduate of the University of New Hampshire." Grenier Army Air Field, Massachusetts, later Grenier Air Force Base, is named in Lt. Grenier's honor on 22 February 1942.
16 February
While on a familiarization flight for impending flights of the U.S. Mail, Lt. J. Y. Eastham (also reported as James Y. Eastman), "23, of the army air corps reserves," is killed in the crash of Douglas Y1B-7, 32-309, in fog at night near Jerome, Idaho. "Second Lieutenant James Y. Eastman, seventh bombardment group, March field [sic], was burned to death here last night when the twin engined Douglas bomber he was flying from Salt Lake City to Seattle in preparation to the war department carrying the mail, crashed and burned. It was misty at the time of the crash and witnesses said the plane was flying low just before the crash. According to Mrs. Clarence Wilson, eyewitness, the plane came skimming in low over the trees, its motor roaring. It passed over the house, she said, then suddenly crashed into the ground about one hundred feet beyond, bursting into flame. Mrs. Wilson immediately ran into the house and called the sheriff at Jerome, six miles from the scene. The Jerome fire department was rushed to the place. Eastman's body was dragged from the still burning plane and taken to the Jerome motuary [sic]. The victim was unmarried. His father is H. G. Eastman, who resides in Huntsville, Texas."

16 February
"Another army pilot on an experimental flight made a forced landing near Linden, New Jersey, when he ran out of fuel." "LINDEN, N. J., Feb. 17. - (UP) - Lieutenant Joseph W. Kelly, army pilot scheduled to fly the mails, escaped injury last night when he ran out of fuel and made a forced landing in a wooded section. Kelly was making an experimental flight from Columbus, Ohio, to Newark, New Jersey."
19 February
"An hour and a half after leaving Atlanta with the army's first airmail plane, Lieut. E. T. Gorman, of Mitchell [sic] Field crashed at the Greenville (S.C.) airport last night after attempting five landings. He was not hurt. Circling the field in an effort accurately to read the wind sock, Gorman came in down wind at too rapid speed and overran the apron. His plane struck a two-foot hedge at the end of the field and nosed over, bending the propeller and washing out one wheel of the undercarriage. The mail was transferred to the northbound Birmingham Special leaving here at 10:20 and consigned to Charlotte, where it was to be picked up by a plane sent down from Richmond and flown to Newark, N. J. Gorman arrived over the field at 9:35. It took him 10 minutes to land. After skimming over the field, he crashed into the hedge and left one wheel in a cotton field that bounds the airport on the southwest. The pilot took off from Atlanta with the first army mail plane to leave that city at 8:15, Eastern Standard time, with an 'average' load of mail. The takeoff was delayed 35 minutes awaiting a mail ship from New Orleans. The weather was clear and cold throughout his flight northward. The plane was due in Greenville at 9:15 but was late because of the delayed start. The schedule calls for northbound army mail planes to arrive at 9:15 p. m., and southbound ships at 5:15 a. m. Observation planes are being used."

19 February
"MANSFIELD, O., Feb 19. - (UP) - An army biplane lay in a mass of wreckage on a farm near here today as a result of the first air mishap in Ohio as the army prepared to take over operation of the airmail service. Lost in a snowstorm while en route to take up his new assignment at Columbus, the pilot, Lieut, J. H. Gibson, was forced to 'bail out' when his gasoline supply ran low. He landed safely a mile and a half from the spot where his plane crashed."

20 February
Lieutenant John C. Crosthwaite, on the first U.S. Army airmail flight between San Francisco and Salt Lake City, is forced down by a local storm at Sacramento, California. The next flight is cancelled. "The plane carrying the southern mail to Newark got as far as Washington at 2:40 a. m., where it was grounded by bad weather."

22 February
Lieutenant Durwood O. Lowry, of the 17th Pursuit Squadron, 1st Pursuit Group, is killed in the crash of an Air Corps Curtiss O-39 Falcon, 32-216, whilst carrying the U.S. Mail, near Deshler, Ohio. His mother, Mrs. Dorothy Lowry Reisdorf, of Detroit, was quoted by the Associated Press, stating, "Good as they are, these Selfridge Field fliers shouldn't have to fly at night through winter storms over unfamiliar courses that it took months for commercial pilots to learn." Lowry's plane, carrying a capacity load (358 pounds of mail) on the Chicago-Toledo route, came down far off its course, in a snowstorm. The observation plane nose-dived into some woods, but Lowry managed to "throw some of his mail free before the crash." His plane was demolished and the mail bags were scattered for some distance behind the place at which the wrecked machine came to rest. "Lowry's body was torn to bits. He apparently had attempted to bail out, but a knot in the parachute cord is believed to have caught in a part of the plane and trapped him. Marks in the woods showed that the plane struck the ground, went forward some distance due to its momentum, and then nosed into the bank of a creek in the woods. The plane was demolished. Residents of the vicinity said Lowry apparently had trouble with his motor and had circled in a search for a landing place. Charles G. Thurston said he heard the plane pass over his farm home shortly before 6 a.m. (E. S. T.) Then he heard the motor being cut off. He said he opened a window and then heard the crash. Thurston telephoned to the Napoleon airport and then went out and found the body and the wreckage. Cutting off the ignition probably saved the wreckage from being destroyed by flames. Guarding the mail to the last, Lowry threw several sacks from the plane before the crash and it was believed all of the mail was recovered. Coroner Guy G. Boyer of Henry county,[sic] was expected to have the body removed to Napoleon. " "Failure of a wireless set to function properly contributed to the death of Lieut. Lowry, Capt. Fred Nelson of Selfridge Field said at Toledo. Far off his course in fog and snow on the Chicago-Cleveland run, Lowry tried to make a parachute jump near Deshler, O. His 'chute' caught on the rigging and he dangled there while the craft plunged into a creek bank. 'Any commercial pilot,' Capt. Nelson declared, 'would have been killed had he been up against the same circumstances which faced Lowry.' He added that 'radios have broken on commercial ships' and that 'you can't follow a radio beacon and stay on your course if your radio isn't working.'" Of 30 Curtiss O-1G Falcons built, ten were refitted with a Curtiss V-1570 Conqueror engine and cockpit canopy and redesignated O-39s.
22 February
"An unidentified mail pilot was reported forced down in the vicinity of Goshen, Ind., without serious mishap, and the mail was forwarded by train."
22 February
Flying the U.S. Mail, Lieutenant Charles P. Hollstein, also given as Hollestein, "out of Cleveland for Washington, was forced down near Uniontown, Pa., in a heavy fog. His plane was damaged, but he escaped unscathed and the mail was saved, according to reports sent to Cleveland airport." According to another account, he "suffered superficial face injuries, but after reporting at Uniontown, walked back into the hills to his plane and returned with the mail to send it on by train. He had been fifty miles off course when he crashed. Hollstein attributed his accident to a faulty radio." Hollstein was piloting Boeing P-12C, 31-235, c/n 1351, when he came down at Woodstock, Pennsylvania.
22 February
U.S. Army Air Corps pilot Lieutenant James McCoy, also reported as H. M. McCoy, and Howard M. McCoy, flying the U.S. Mail, departed Newark at ~noon, but landed his aircraft in a cow pasture at Dishtown, Pennsylvania, in the Alleghenies, with a burned out engine two hours later. He was not hurt. "His ship was smashed against a clump of trees but he escaped with a cut face." He turned the mail over to the post officer at Woodland. "For several hours officers at Newark were badly worried for him." A United Press account states that "At Clearfield, Pennsylvania, Lieut, H. M. McCoy, saved his load of mail, bound for Cleveland from Newark, after his motor caught fire. He was forced down, but the mail went on by train."
22 February
Lieutenant Frederick Irving Patrick (16 July 1893 – 22 February 1934), a native of Decatur, Nebraska, was killed in the forced landing of Boeing P-26 Peashooter, 33–46, c/n 1822, of the 55th Pursuit Squadron, 20th Fighter Group, Barksdale Field, Shreveport, Louisiana, whilst on a flight from Barksdale to Denison, Texas, his machine coming down at a location described in one source as an emergency field 10 miles from Denison, and as being only 1.5 miles S of Denison in another. An Associated Press bulletin states that "his pursuit plane crashed into a plowed field one mile from here (Denison) at 9:50 a. m. today." Lt. Patrick had been en route to Denison to visit his father on his birthday when he experienced a throttle control malfunction. His death was the third air fatality for Barksdale Field. He was interred with military honors at Arlington National Cemetery, Virginia. "He had expected to go to Shreveport, La., today (23 February) to complete organization of the air mail field there."
22 February
"Caught in weather thick with rain and fog, Liet. Harold Diet [sic], crashed in a field near Marion Station, Md. last night (22 February) on his way from Newark, N. J. to Richmond, Va., with mail. He was carried to a hospital with severe head injuries. 'Take care of the mails,' he said to persons who had rushed to the place where his plane had been wrecked against a tree." This pilot is also correctly reported as Harold L. Dietz, in Douglas O-38B, 31-437, coming down near Crisfield, Maryland, at "about six o'clock" in the evening. "He was rushed to the McCready Hospital at Crisfield, suffering from a fractured skull and internal damages." He had departed Newark at 1600 hours after flights to the west had been suspended for several hours because of bad weather over the mountains with more coming in from that direction.
22 February
"Lieut. R. M. Barton, speeding along the Jacksonville-Richmond route, was forced to land at Cocoa, Fla., by a heavy fog. He made a safe landing."
23 February
A US Army Air Corps Curtiss O-39 Falcon, 32-219, assigned to the air mail service crashes in bad weather near Fremont, Ohio, with pilot Lt. Norman R. Burnett suffering a fractured leg upon descending by parachute. A news report states that "One ankle was broken and he suffered exposure to the bitter cold for five hours while dragging himself to a farmhouse." According to an Associated Press item, the pilot was taken to Memorial Hospital in Fremont from where he reported his condition to superior officers in Cleveland. "At the time of the accident he was flying an empty run from Cleveland to Chicago." Joe Baugher cites crash date as 23 August 1934.
23 February
Three Air Corps crew are forced down in an aircraft in the Atlantic off of Rockaway Point, New York, whilst en route from Mitchel Field, New York, to Langley Field, Virginia, to pick up mail planes. Planes and vessels searched the sea off New York for the body of Lieutenant George F. McDermott, described by the press as the fifth flier to die in connection with the army's task of carrying the air mail. Forced down amidst "crashing waves", McDermott's two companions, Lieutenants J. H. Rothrock and W. S. Pocock, were picked up by the U.S. Navy destroyer USS Bernadou. They were reported to be "weak from exposure." The vessel could not find McDermott, nor salvage the disintegrating plane. "McDermott, whose family lives in Greenfield, Pa., slipped to his death in the icy Atlantic hours after the plane faltered and alighted. His companions, clad in heavy flying suits and weakened by exposure, could not help him." McDermott, "23, battled side by side with his companions, Lieut. J. H. Rothrock and Lieut. W. S. Pocock, for five hours on the ice-covered wings of the plane before he died, the sixth to lose his life in connection with preparations for the army to fly the mail. Once, in the almost super-human struggle of the three to cut loose the craft's motors and keep afloat, he fell into the choppy sea. Doggedly, he swam back to where his companions could pull him aboard again. The could [sic] was intense and a stiff wind whipped the waves high. Again McDermott's grip failed and he slid away from his companions and into the water, apparently unconscious. Rothrock and Pocock couldn't reach him, and within a moment he had disappeared. Ten minutes later rescuers from the destroyed [sic] Bernadou - leading a fleet of ships and planes which had sought for hours to reach the pilots - reached the almost submered [sic] craft and took off Rothrock and Pocock. James H. Rothrock was listed as the pilot of this flight, in Douglas C-29 Dolphin, 33-293, c/n 1184, one of only two of the C-29 amphibious flying boats acquired by the Air Corps. An Associated Press wire photo is published 2 March 1934 showing Pocock and Rothrock recovering in hospital.

27 February
"LOS ANGELES, Feb. 27. - An army mail plane, piloted by Lieut. M. J. Walsh, finished its trip from Salt Lake City on its back and on the wrong airport today. The pilot put his plane down on the Grand Central air terminal instead of the United airport, the army's base of operation for the transportation of air mail.Spectators of the accident said Walsh apparently braked before the tail skid had touched the ground and the momentum carried the plane over in a neat somersault. Walsh was uninjured, but the ship was damaged. It was not explained why he landed at the wrong airport." Walsh was flying Douglas O-38E, 34-16.

4 March
"FORT LEAVENWORTH, Kan., March 4. - Fire which followed an unexplained explosion at Fort Leavenworth today destroyed 10 army airplanes, seriously damaging a $100,000 hangar, and caused a total loss estimated by army officers at nearly half a million dollars. The explosion which started the blaze occurred early this morning, while six men were sleeping in one wing of the building. Almost miraculously, however, no one was injured by the fierce flames or the explosions which occurred one after another of the planes, all with gasoline in their tanks, became ignited. The planes which were destroyed included four observation ships, a bomber, four two-passenger B. T. type planes, and a pursuit plane. Total value of the aircraft, it was estimated, was around $150,000. Damage to the hangar, which was completed less than a year ago, was estimated at $350,000. In addition, great loss in flying equipment was reported. Considerable experimental equipment, for blind flying and other purposes, was in the hangar, and this was a total loss. Sgt. D. L. Logan, who has been at the fort the past six years, in charge of properties and supplies at the airport, said that the part of the hangar where the planes are kept was locked up last night."

9 March
An engine fails during a night takeoff causing a Keystone B-6A, 32–148, piloted by Lt. Walter W. Reid, to crash near Daytona, Florida, shortly after departing the airport there, while carrying the southbound U.S. Mail. Passenger Pvt. Ernest B. Sell, the plane's mechanic, of Indiana, Pennsylvania, is killed. "Liet. W. M. Reid, and Floyd Marshall, a private, were injured. The motors failed and the plane fell in a heavily wooden section two miles south of this city." "Barely airborne, the Keystone began to lose power. Reid fought to keep the lumbering plane in the air while Sell, in the rear cockpit, struggled with the fuel pump, trying to get the line cleared. At five hundred feet the engines quit and the bomber dropped in a stall. It slammed into a cypress swamp adjoining the field. When the splinters stopped flying, Reid and Marshall were clear of the plane and unhurt, but Private First Class Sell had not been so lucky. His head had been smashed by the impact. He was dead." This source also reports the survivor's name as A. M. Marshall. Reid, of Albany, Georgia, a Reserve officer on active duty, was seriously shaken. Floyd M. Marshall, of Lincoln, Nebraska, had a broken arm.
9 March
The crash of Curtiss O-39 Falcon, 32-217, near Burton, Ohio, kills Lt. Otto Wienecke, while flying the U.S. Mail. Datelined from Chardon, Ohio, an Associated Press account states, "Army Air Mail Pilot Otto Wienecke, flying from Newark, N. J., to Cleveland with the mail, crashed to his death in the midst of a heavy snow squall this morning on a farm northwest of Burton, near here. Chardon is about 20 miles directly east of Cleveland. The plane was destroyed, but ten bags of mail were salvaged and brought to the postoffice [sic] here. John Hess, a farmer in whose pasture the plane crashed, said he and several neighbors heard the plane's motors about 5 a. m. (EST). It apparently was sputtering, and Hess rushed out in time to see the crash. Coroner Philip Pease reported looking at the ship's altimeter and finding a reading of 600 feet. Hess said Wienecke apparently had no opportunity to save himself. His safety belt was still hooked when the farmer reached his side. Hess declared the snow was coming down in a heavy swirl at the time of the accident. Since the army took over the mail flights, six other army pilots have been killed, either while flying mail, making unofficial flights, or reporting to army posts." Wienecke was buried on Long Island, New York, on 11 March, with six Lieutenants of the 5th Aero Squadron as pallbearers and honors rendered by a firing squad and bugler from Mitchel Field.
9 March
A Douglas O-38E, 34-18, flying U.S. Mail crashes "in flames" on takeoff from Cheyenne, Wyoming, killing 2d. Lt. Frank L. Howard and Air Reserve 2d. Lt. Arthur R. "Duke" Kerwin. The Associated Press reported that "The fliers killed last night, Lieuts. A. R. Kerwin of March Field, Calif., and F. L. Howard of Shreveport, La., were seeking to familiarize themselves with the Cheyenne-Salt Lake City route when the plane plunged in the darkness and hit the power line." "The accident occurred about 150 yards from the Cheyenne airport. Eye witnesses said the ship developed motor trouble soon after taking off from the Cheyenne field. They said the two lieutenants, bound for Salt Lake City, circled over the city once after they took off from the field and then headed west. Their motor sputtered and the men circled again, apparently attempting to head back to the field. The plane struck the power line, turned a loop and crashed almost nose first into the ground. It made a hole three feet deep in the earth. A huge ball of fire burst from the ship and in a second it was a mass of flames, easily seen from the Cheyenne airport where employes [sic] had been watching the plane. Before aid could reach the two lieutenants they were burned to death. The flames drove back rescuers who tried to reach them. After first striking the earth the plane bounced about 50 yards, where it came to rest. The plane was not loaded with mail at the time of the crash, as the men had taken off on a night trial run to Salt Lake City. They recently had been transferred here as the army took over the air mail lines. Although Kerwin formerly lived in Cheyenne he was unfamiliar with the airport and transcontinental air line near here. Had the men been familiar with the country near the airport it was believed by aviation officials they could have made a safe landing. There are a number of smooth fields surrounding the airport. The ship was an open type used by the army for observation purposes."

9 March
"Hartsville, S. C., Mar. 10. (AP) – Three army mail fliers who became lost last night en route from Richmond to Miami when their radio went bad landed near here in rain and fog early today with only a slight damage to the ship and no injuries to its occupants. The craft was piloted by Lieut. Allen of Michigan. With him were Sgt. Harry Shilling, a native of Harrisburg, Pa., but now living in Richmond, and a corporal who was taken on the ship at Washington. Immediately after bringing the mail here and sending it to Florence 25 miles away, by motor, the men went to sleep in the rear of the postoffice [sic] and authorities refused to rouse them for questioning. Shilling, however, had said Allen – whose first name he did not know – was piloting the ship. The sergeant did not know the name of the corporal. Shilling said they left Richmond last night about 8:30 and expected to land at Florence, but their radio went bad and they cruised about until they found the landing field near here."
30 March
While on landing approach to Davenport, Iowa, Lt. Thurmond A. Wood, flying U.S. Mail in a Curtiss A-12 Shrike, 33-246, enters a severe thunderstorm. Attempting to reverse course, he loses control and spins in on a farm at DeWitt, Iowa, with fatal result. This aircraft probably was of the 3d Attack Group at Fort Crockett. Texas. "Wood was flying to Omaha with 23 pouches of mail. The plane crashed in the field of William Mommsen, farmer living five and one half miles northeast of Dewitt. [sic] It was discovered by Leonard McGuire, a farmer living nearby. There were no witnesses to the crash. Wood left Chicago at 7:15 p. m. for Des Moines." "His body was crushed between the motor and a load of mail he was carrying." "His body was badly mutilated. The nose of the plane was buried four feet in the ground." "The motor was torn loose." This was the twelfth Army death in the effort to fly the mail. "It marked the first fatality, however, since the army resumed the mail routes since a suspension of service." "Clinton County Coroner L. O. Riggert took charge of the body. It was to be taken to Dewitt." [sic] "Mail pouches scattered over the ground were collected by a crowd of farmers. They were turned over to postal authorities at Clinton. Coroner Riggert obtained a tractor from a neighboring farmer and attempted to pull away the fuselage to get to the pilot's body. There was no fire."

31 March
"SACRAMENTO, March 31. - Eastbound airmail was delayed approximately six hours here early today when an army plane piloted by Lieut. C. B. Stone snipped off the top of a power pole as he was preparing to land at the municipal airport. Lieutenant Stone was able to keep the plane under control and brought it to a safe landing. Because of slight damage to wings and struts, it was decided to bring a relief ship from Oakland to continue the trip eastward."

5 April
"ALTOONA, Pa., April 5. - Second Lieut. John Leland McAlister of Langley Field, Va., leaped to his death late today a few seconds before his army ship crashed into the side of Healy's mountain, one of the rugged peaks that stud the area known as the 'graveyard of aviators.'Three farmers in a field about five miles west of the Duncansville (Altoona) airport saw the reserve officer suddenly rise in the plane as it roared toward the rocky mountainside and leap from the cockpit, less than 200 feet in the air. Slashing their way through the dense underbrush and rolling terrain of 'Maple hollow,' the farmers found the body resting against a tree, 80 feet from the wreckage of the plane, which had rolled 100 feet down the mountainside. Unable to determine the cause, airmen said the pilot might have been trying to fly between Healy's mountain and Pomeroy mountain, realized something had happened to his controls and decided to risk an almost certain death by such a short leap rather than dash against the bare mountainside. The pilot's log stated he left his home port, Langley field [sic], this morning and made stops at Bolling field [sic] and Middletown, Pa. The last entry was 3 p. m., on leaving Middletown. He was ferrying the empty ship to Cleveland for use in the mail service." Langley Field authorities said that McAlister joined the Air Corps as an assistant engineering officer one year ago, and that he was assigned to air mail duty recently. He was flying Curtiss P-6E Hawk, 32-270.

14 April
The Wright Cyclone-powered prototype Polikarpov TsKB-12 is damaged when one of the landing gear legs collapses while taxiing. It first flew on 30 December 1933.

15 April
While flying the U.S. Mail, 1st Lt. Arthur Lahman's engine on his Douglas O-38B, 31-435, c/n 995, '22', of Headquarters Command, Bolling Field, cuts out on approach to Newark, New Jersey, and crashes in a field. Pilot uninjured but airframe written off. Pilot name also reported spelt Arthur J. Lehman.

23 April
Major Charles Belding "Barney" Oldfield Jr., a regional commander for the Air Corps mail western zone, neglects to lower the undercarriage of Martin YB-10, 33-147, in preparation for landing at Cheyenne, Wyoming, and bellys the bomber in.
11 May
Sole prototype of U.S. Navy Douglas XO2D-1, BuNo 9412, c/n 1236, noses over on water landing near NAS Anacostia, Washington, D.C., after starboard landing gear would not retract, nor support runway landing. Pilot survives. Aircraft salvaged, rebuilt, but no production contract let.

18 May
"LOS ANGELES, May 18. - An army transport plane crashed today on Riverside drive [sic] near the Griffith park airport [sic], but skilful maneuvering of the crippled ship prevented complete wreckage and the two men aboard were uninjured. Heavily laden with supplies from the Rockwell field [sic] depot at San Diego, the transport was on a routine supply trip to Long Beach, Griffith park and March field [sic] airports. Controls failed to function and with one wing low and tail down the ship was piloted by Private Marvin P. Stadler between high tension wires and two trees which broke the crash, and neither men nor cargo were injured. Private Mason A. Garrett, was co-pilot." The craft was Bellanca C-27A Airbus, 33-25, ten of which the Air Corps acquired. The Aviation Archeology website lists the pilot's name as Marvin F. Stalder.

20 May
Douglas BT-2A, 30-223, c/n 664, converted from an O-32A (all 30 O-32As were so modified), of the 94th Pursuit Squadron, Selfridge Field, Michigan, stalls and spins in at Marysville, Michigan, killing both crew. "Near Port Huron, Mich., a Selfridge field [sic] army airplane crashed just after takeoff, cremating Lieut. Frank J. Findlay, 30, Detroit, member of the air corps reserve, and Private George J. Scott, 27, Chicago. The pair were making a training flight." The Aviation Archeology website incorrectly lists the serial number for this aircraft as Fiscal Year 31-223, which ties up to a Boeing P-12C.
June
Second prototype of two Mitsubishi 1MF10 Experimental 7-Shi carrier fighters, crashes when it enters irrecoverable flat spin. Test pilot Lt. Motoharu Okamura bails out, but loses four fingers in the accident, jeopardizing his career as a fighter pilot. As a Navy captain, he later commands the 341st (Tateyama) Kōkūtai for kamikaze attacks in June 1944.
14 June
United States Navy Curtiss XSBC-1 Helldiver, BuNo 9225, crashed at Lancaster, New York. Rebuilt, it will crash again in September.

17 July
"SUNNYVALE, Cal., July 17. - Two young naval air officers were critically injured here today when their plant [sic] crashed 200 feet into a flying field adjoining the naval air station. The men were H. W. Richardson, pilot, and Clinton S. Rounds, both student fliers."

27 July
First prototype Messerschmitt Bf 108A, D-LBUM, wrk. nr. 695, accepted by the Luftwaffe for competition flying, crashes, killing the pilot, Baron Wolf von Dungern, a member of Erhard Milch's staff at the Reichsluftfahrtministerium (Ministry of Aviation).
September
The Curtiss XSBC-1 Helldiver, BuNo 9225, crashes again, this time when a wing-fold mechanism fails, allowing wing to sweep back in flight. Airframe destroyed. Redesigned new-build airframe as XSBC-2 received same Navy serial.

3 September
Fokker Y1O-27, 31-599, of the 12th Observation Squadron, Brooks Field, Texas, crashes 5 miles W of Danville, Louisiana, which community is four miles W of Hodge, after starboard engine loses power. Pilot Cadet Neil M. Caldwell and passenger Pvt. Betz Baker die in crash and fire, passenger Pvt. Virgil K. Martin, riding in rear cockpit, survives with minor injuries. This aircraft has previously ditched in San Diego Bay, California on 16 December 1932. An Associated Press report in the Chicago Daily Tribune on 4 September identifies the survivor as Pvt. P. K. Martin and states that he was "seriously burned".

3 October
Martin B-12A, 33-171, c/n 545, of the 11th Bomb Squadron, 7th Bomb Group, crashed into Inyo National Forest, California, 3 killed, one bailed out. Surveyed at March Field, California, 7 January 1935. This accident resulted in the grounding of all B-12s. Fault traced to wing and aileron flutter and a backlash developed by the props when the engine was shut down.
31 October
First prototype Tupolev ANT-40RT suffers engine problems on flight test out of TsAGI (Tsentral'nyy Aerodinamicheskiy i Gidrodinamicheskiy Institut- central aerodynamics and hydrodynamics institute), and pilot K. K. Popov makes a wheels-up forced landing at Khodynka Aerodrome. Repairs take until February 1935. It had made its first flight on 7 October.
5 November
Pioneer Air Service aviator Col. Horace Meek Hickam, (1885–1934), dies when his Curtiss A-12 Shrike, 33–250, of the 60th Service Squadron, strikes an obstruction during night landing practice on the unlighted field at Fort Crockett, Texas, overturns. "The field at Fort Crockett, Texas, home of the 3rd Attack Group, was too short. Because of its smallness and the roughness of its southern end, planes landing to the south, even against a light wind, made it a point to touch down between its boundary lights-the field's only lights-just beyond the shallow embankment of its northern threshold. On the evening of November 5, Air Reserve Second Lieutenants Harry N. Renshaw and Andrew N. Wynne were standing on the porch of Group Operations talking to Captain Charles C. Chauncey, the Operations Officer, watching Uncle Horace Hickam shooting night landings in his Curtiss A-12. It was close to eight o'clock as they observed the Colonel coming in for his second touchdown. They realized he was low and was going to undershoot. So did Hickam. He applied power to correct the error and then chopped it off too soon. The watchers saw the A-12's wheels hit the embankment just below its top, saw the plane flipped on its nose, skidding along the ground, the weight of its engine tearing up the turf, and then saw it snap over on its back, slewing completely around. The three men were running toward the aircraft before the sound had died. Wynne arrived first, yelling, "Colonel, are you hurt? Can you hear me?" There was no answer. The cockpit rim was flat on the ground. A group of enlisted men came charging up, followed by the crash truck and an ambulance. Even after Renshaw had driven the cab of the ambulance under the broken tail fin, with the men holding up the fuselage, they could not get Hickam free of the cockpit. It was necessary to dig a trench to do that. By the time Renshaw and Wynne had managed to get the Colonel out of his parachute and onto a litter, Captain Byrnes, the base doctor, had arrived. While the ambulance raced to the Marine Hospital, Byrnes did what he could, but it was too late. Renshaw believed his CO was dead before they had managed to free him from the cockpit." Hickam Field, Oahu, Hawaiian Islands, named for him 21 May 1935.
12 December
Fokker YO-27, 31-588, of the 12th Observation Squadron, Brooks Field, Texas, belly-lands at Brooks this date. Airframe surveyed and dropped from inventory, 7 March 1935, total flight time 296 hours.

== See also ==
- List of accidents and incidents involving military aircraft
