= Sydney Pope =

British World War I flying ace

- Born: 27 March 1898; Dublin, Ireland
- Died: 5 November 1980 (aged 82)
- Military career
- Allegiance: United Kingdom
- Branch: British Army; Royal Air Force
- Service years: 1916–1946
- Rank: Air Commodore
- Nickname: Poppy
- Units: No. 60 Squadron RFC; No. 208 Squadron RAF; No. 8 Squadron RAF; No. 55 Squadron RAF; No. 22 Squadron RAF
- Commands: No. 54 Squadron RAF; RAF Debden; No. 226 Squadron RAF; RAF Leuchars; No. 32 Operational Training Unit; RAF Syerston
- Conflicts: World War I • Western Front; World War II • Battle of France
- Awards: Commander of the Order of the British Empire; Distinguished Flying Cross; Air Force Cross; Commander of the Order of Orange-Nassau (Netherlands)

Air Commodore Sydney Leo Gregory Pope, CBE, DFC, AFC (27 March 1898 – 5 November 1980) was a British World War I flying ace credited with six aerial victories while serving in the Royal Flying Corps. He then made the Royal Air Force his career, finally retiring in 1946 after serving in Bomber Command's B5 Group.

== World War I ==
Pope was born in Dublin, the third son of William Pope, of Waterford, Ireland. He joined the Inns of Court Officers' Training Corps as a cadet, having been promoted to lance corporal by the time he was commissioned as a second lieutenant on 3 June 1916 to serve in the Royal Flying Corps. He was appointed a flying officer on the General List on 29 August, and served as an instructor at RAF Ternhill until assigned to No. 60 Squadron in April 1917, where he originally flew a Nieuport 17 fighter. Pope scored twice with a Nieuport, on 8 and 20 June. He then upgraded to a SE.5 and destroyed an Albatros D.III on 16 September. Switching to a slightly improved SE.5a, he destroyed two reconnaissance aircraft on 8 November, and another D.III on the 11th. A week later, he was wounded and forced to land near Saint Julien.

Pope then served as a flying instructor, commanding the Fighter Flight at the Central Flying School at Upavon. and was promoted to lieutenant on 3 December 1917. He was promoted to the temporary rank of captain on 10 August 1918, to serve as a flight commander in No. 208 Squadron until the Armistice.

== Inter-war service ==
Pope was again appointed a temporary captain on 1 May 1919, to serve as a flight commander at the headquarters of the Army of Occupation in Germany, relinquishing the rank on 4 August. On 24 October 1919 he was granted a short service commission with the rank of flying officer, serving as an instructor at the RAF (Cadet) College, and then in No. 8 Squadron from 21 April 1922. Soon afterwards, on 2 May, his commission was made permanent.

Pope was promoted to flight lieutenant on 30 June 1923, and was posted to No. 55 Squadron, based in Iraq, on 24 September. On 27 December 1924 he was posted to the staff of RAF Middle East in Egypt. On 28 May 1926 he was awarded the Distinguished Flying Cross, "in recognition of gallant and distinguished service in connection with the operations in Iraq during the period September to November 1924". He returned to the Home Establishment on 27 September, posted to the Depot at RAF Uxbridge.

On 1 February 1927 he was assigned to No. 22 Squadron, attached to the Aeroplane and Armament Experimental Establishment at RAF Martlesham Heath, and on the 15th received his DFC from the King at Buckingham Palace. As well as his duties as a test pilot, Pope found the time to take part in several sporting events. On 15 April he attended the Bournemouth Easter Meeting, taking part in the Branksome "Cirrus" Handicap Stakes flying de Havilland DH.60 Moth (G-EBPG), and in June attended the Bournemouth Whitsun Meeting, taking part in the Medium-Power Handicap Stakes.

On 1 March 1929 Pope was test flying the second prototype of the Parnall Pipit single-seat fighter over the Parnall airfield at Yate, Gloucestershire. During the flight test the tail and rudder broke off. Pope parachuted out the aircraft at a height of 1,000 feet (300 m), making a successful landing despite standing over 6 feet (1.8 m) tall and weighing about 15 stone (210 lb (95 kg)), and thus becoming a member of the Caterpillar Club. The same day he was awarded the Air Force Cross, receiving his medal from the Prince of Wales at St. James's Palace on 28 March.

On 13 July 1929 he was appointed to the Directorate of Scientific Research at the Air Ministry. A year later, in July 1930, Pope flew the Avro 618 Five (G-AASO) owned by Sir Philip Sassoon, in the King's Cup Air Race, but did not complete the course, being forced to retire at Manchester. On 17 November 1931 he took part in a Squash competition representing the RAF against the Royal Aero Club.

Pope was promoted to squadron leader on 1 February 1932, and on 7 March was appointed Officer Commanding, No. 54 (Fighter) Squadron, based at RAF Hornchurch. In early July he led his squadron in a demonstration attack on an "enemy" airfield during the thirteenth annual RAF Display at Hendon Aerodrome, with his squadron's Bristol Bulldog's also taking part in the annual RAF Air Exercise, as part on the "Northland" Air Forces, later in the same month.

On 13 September 1933 he took command of No. 801 (Fleet Fighter) Squadron, and on 27 May 1936 was appointed adjutant at the School of Naval Co-operation based at Lee-on-the-Solent.

On 1 April 1937 Pope was promoted to wing commander, and on 21 April was appointed Officer Commanding, RAF Debden. In July 1938 Pope was Officer-in-Charge when eleven Hurricanes from No. 111 Squadron, and four Gladiators from No. 87 Squadron, accompanied by a Valentia bomber-transport and two Ansons carrying ground staff and spare equipment, flew from RAF Northolt to Villacoublay, near Paris, to give aerobatic and formation flying demonstrations. Two new French aircraft, the Potez 63 and the Amiot bomber, also made demonstration flights.

== World War II ==
On 1 March 1939 Pope was appointed Officer Commanding No. 226 Squadron, based at RAF Harwell, flying Fairey Battle light bombers. On 2 September the squadron was sent to France as part of the RAF Advanced Air Striking Force. The squadron suffered heavy losses during the German invasion in 1940 and was evacuated back to England in mid-June. By then Pope had been appointed commander of RAF Leuchars, having been promoted to temporary group captain on 1 June 1940.

In November 1941 Pope was sent to Canada to conduct an inspection of flying training schools, and on 1 March 1942 he was appointed commander of No. 32 OTU, in Canada. On 20 October Pope was granted permission to wear the insignia of a Commander of the Order of Orange-Nassau, conferred upon him "in recognition of valuable services rendered in connection with the war" by the Queen of the Netherlands.

In 1943 Pope was appointed as Officer Commanding, RAF Syerston, and on 8 February 1944 as Air Officer Commanding, RAF Leuchars being appointed an acting air commodore about that time. On 8 June 1944 he received a mention in dispatches, and was promoted to the war substantive rank of group captain on 8 August. In January 1945 he was appointed commander of a base in Bomber Command.

After the end of the war, in the 1946 New Year Honours, Pope was made a Commander of the Order of the British Empire. He retired from the Royal Air Force, retaining the rank of air commodore, on 2 March 1946.

== Personal life ==
In 1928 Pope married Pamela Young, the elder daughter of Dr. and Mrs. A. Cameron Young, of Ipswich.
