= William H. McAvoy =

- Occupation: Aviator

William H. "Bill" McAvoy was a civilian test pilot in the 1920s and 1930s for the National Advisory Committee for Aeronautics (NACA) at the Langley Memorial Aeronautical Laboratory, Langley Field, Virginia, and in 1940 helped start the flight operations division at the Ames Research Center, California.

== Life ==
He had served in the U.S. Army from 1917 to 1921.

Employed by NACA by 1929, McAvoy was one of several pilots, including Melvin N. Gough, Edmund T. "Eddie" Allen, and Thomas Carroll that NACA trained "in stability and control research techniques, including the ability to reach and hold equilibrium flight conditions with accuracy. As with all good research test pilots, the NACA group worked closely with flight test engineers and in fact took part in discussing NACA’s flying qualities work with outsiders. All of this helped lay the groundwork for the comprehensive flying qualities research that followed."

McAvoy was involved in the testing of many different aircraft types at the Langley Field facilities near Hampton, Virginia, including the third of the Grumman XF3F-1 prototypes, BuNo 9727 (3rd), rebuilt from the wreckage of the second prototype which crashed at Naval Air Station Anacostia, Washington, D.C., on 17 May 1935.

On 15 October 1929, McAvoy was testing the Martin XT5M-1 divebomber, BuNo A-8051, when, during terminal dive test at 350 IAS at 8,000 feet, the lower starboard wing caved in, ripping an extensive hole. McAvoy staggered the aircraft back to the Martin field north of Baltimore, Maryland, landing at 110 mph with full-left stick input and thereby saving the machine. The aircraft would go into production as the BM-1.

In July 1931, McAvoy and Melvin Gough conducted a series of tests on America's first autogyro, the Pitcairn PCA-2, NACA 44. The test series was the first to yield quantitative data on the handling qualities of the forerunner of the helicopter.

McAvoy also handled the first flight of the Grumman XFF-1, on 29 December 1931. He conducted the majority of the flight testing of the design in 1932.

On the first flight of the United States Navy Hall XP2H-1 four-engine flying boat, BuNo A-8729, at Naval Air Station Anacostia, Washington, D.C., on 15 November 1932, it nosed straight up on take-off due to an incorrectly rigged stabilizer. Test pilot Bill McAvoy and the aircraft's designer, Charles Ward Hall, Sr., managed to chop the throttles, with the plane settling back onto the surface of the river, suffering only minor damage. This sole prototype was the largest four-engine biplane the U.S. Navy ever procured, with a wingspan of 112 feet.

He was forced to bail out of an experimental airframe on at least one occasion. On 30 March 1936, the sole Pitcairn YG-2 gyrocopter, (Pitcairn PA-33), 35-270, undergoing tests by NACA, suffered structural failure, and crashed near the Back River, Virginia, two miles SE of Langley Field, and burned. McAvoy managed to safely escape the rotor-winged craft. With this jump, McAvoy became Caterpillar Club member number 777, although the date cited is 21 March 1936.

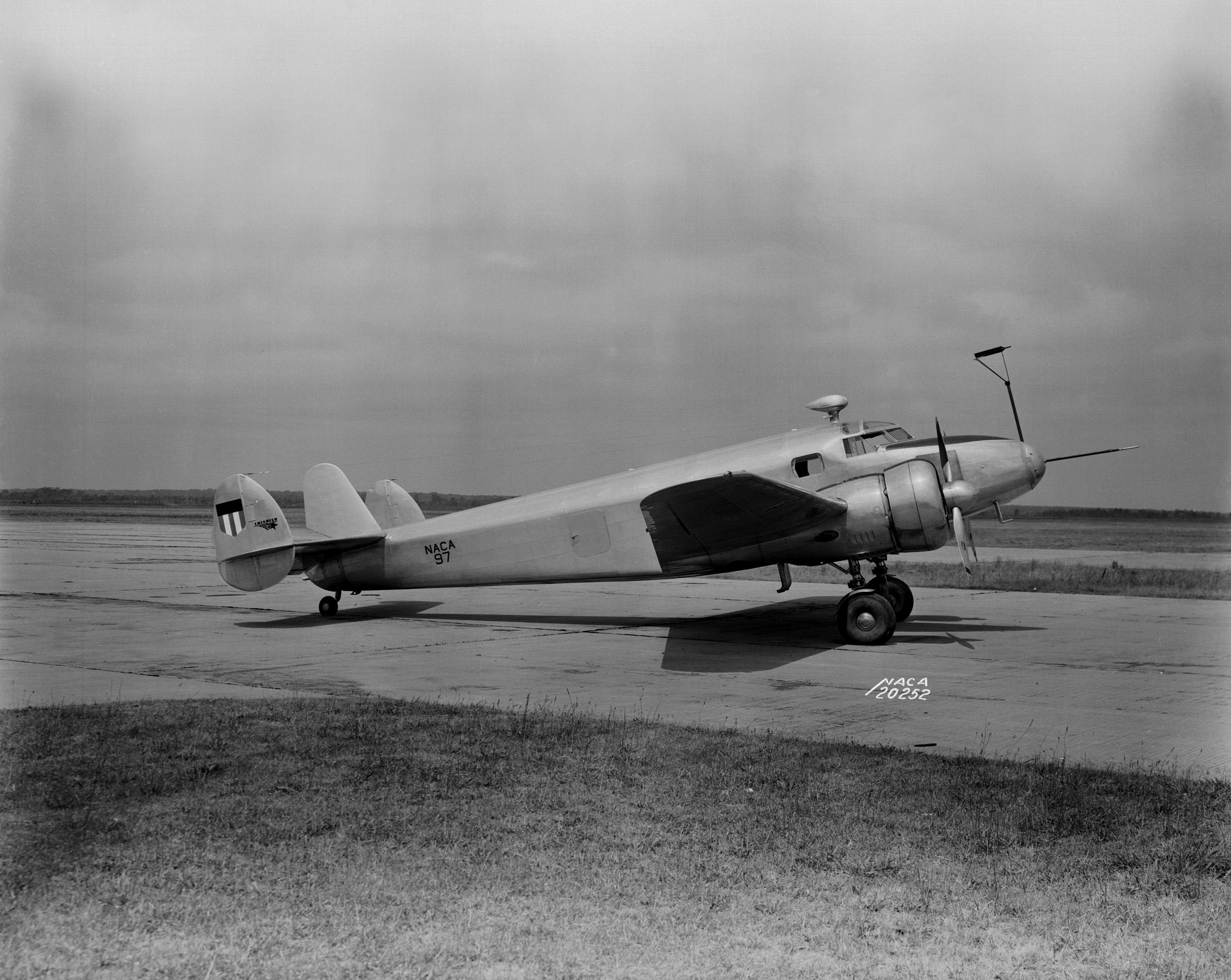
NACA's Lockheed 12A used for deicing testing.

After transferring to Ames Research Center in the fall of 1940, McAvoy was involved in ice-research work. NACA and the military were very interested in advancing all-weather flight capabilities at this time. He flew a Martin XPM, a North American O-47, and later, a Lockheed 12A transport, specially modified by Kelly Johnson and Lockheed with engine exhaust ducted through the wing leading edges and exhausting at the wingtips. From early 1940, this plane was flown into the worst weather to be found, and the research provided by the heavily instrumented airframe showed that anti-icing systems were practical.

"In 1943 the Institute of the Aeronautical Sciences had given Ames pilot William H. McAvoy the Octave Chanute Award for 'continuous service in the flight testing of experimental planes under hazardous conditions imposed by aeronautical research.' Certainly an important part of the motivation for this award came from the hazardous deicing flights of the Lockheed 12 on which McAvoy had served as pilot." (The pending award was actually announced by the Institute of Aeronautical Sciences, in New York, on 9 January 1944.)
