= Martin BM =

1930s American torpedo bomber

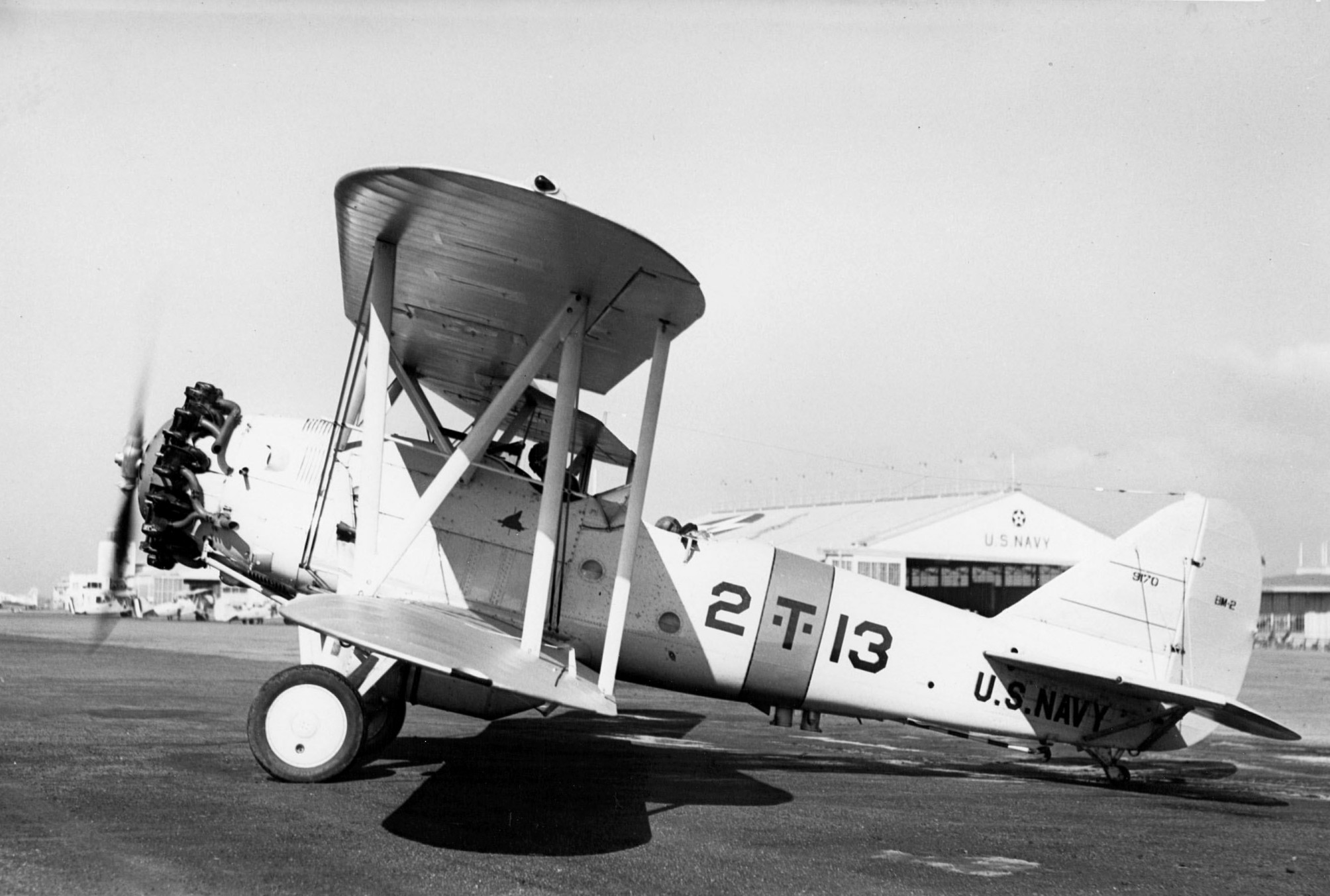
- A BM-2 of VT-2B in the early 1930s

General information
- Type: Dive bomber or torpedo bomber
- Manufacturer: Martin
- Primary user: United States Navy
- Number built: 35

History
- Introduction date: 1931
- First flight: 17 May 1929

The Martin BM was a 1930s American torpedo bomber built by the Glenn L. Martin Company for the United States Navy.

== Design and development ==
To meet the requirement for a special-purpose dive bomber for the United States Navy and United States Marine Corps, the U.S. Navy's Bureau of Aeronautics designed a biplane with fixed-tailwheel landing gear designated Bureau Design 77. It had room for two crew in tandem. Two prototypes were ordered in June 1928, one from Martin (designated the XT5M-1) and one from the Naval Aircraft Factory (designated the XT2N-1).

Martin moved to a new factory in Baltimore, Maryland, where the XT5M-1 was built, and it was first flown on 17 May 1929. It was powered by a 525 horsepower (391 kW) Pratt & Whitney R-1690-22 Hornet radial engine. During testing, the aircraft suffered structural damage during a pullout from a dive and had to be returned to the factory. After a redesign and rebuilding of the wings, the XTM5-1 was handed over to the Navy in May 1930 for service trials. Following further tests during 1930, the Navy ordered 12 aircraft with a more powerful R-1690-44 engine in April 1931, designating them the BM-1. A further order for four BM-1 aircraft was followed by an order in October 1931 for 16 of the BM-2, a variant with minor improvements.

== Operational history ==
The first production BM-1, A8879, was delivered to the U.S. Navy at Naval Air Station Anacostia in Washington, D.C., for acceptance testing in September 1931. The Navy refused to accept the type after A8879 had a fatal crash during a test dive in September 1931. Meanwhile, the prototype was flown aboard the aircraft carrier USS Langley (CV-1) from November 1931 to prove its suitability as a carrier aircraft. Martin modified the second production aircraft, used the same serial as the crashed aircraft, and delivered it to the Navy in January 1932. The Navy accepted the second A8879 on 27 February 1932 and the delivery of 15 more followed, with the last accepted in July 1931.

In June 1932 the BM-1s were delivered to Torpedo Squadron 1 (VT-1S) aboard the aircraft carrier USS Lexington (CV-2) to replace the squadron's Martin T4Ms. In March 1933 the squadron was redesignated VT-1B when it became part of the Battle Force. By October 1932 it had ten BM-1s and ten BM-2s in service.

In July 1934, the U.S. Navy formed Bombing Squadron 3 (VB-3B) for service aboard the aircraft carrier USS Ranger (CV-4) operating the BM-1 and BM-2, which the squadron flew until February 1935. Other carrier squadrons — including VB-5 and VT-5 aboard USS Yorktown (CV-5) and VT-6 aboard USS Enterprise (CV-6) — also operated Martin BMs for short periods before they moved on to other aircraft. By the middle of 1938 only a small number of Martin BMs remained in service, most with the test and evaluation squadrons VX-3D4 and VX-4D4 based at Philadelphia, Pennsylvania. By the end of 1939, all BM-1s and BM-2s were out of service.

Martin built an additional aircraft designated the XBM-1 for trials and testing with the National Advisory Committee for Aeronautics.

== Variants ==
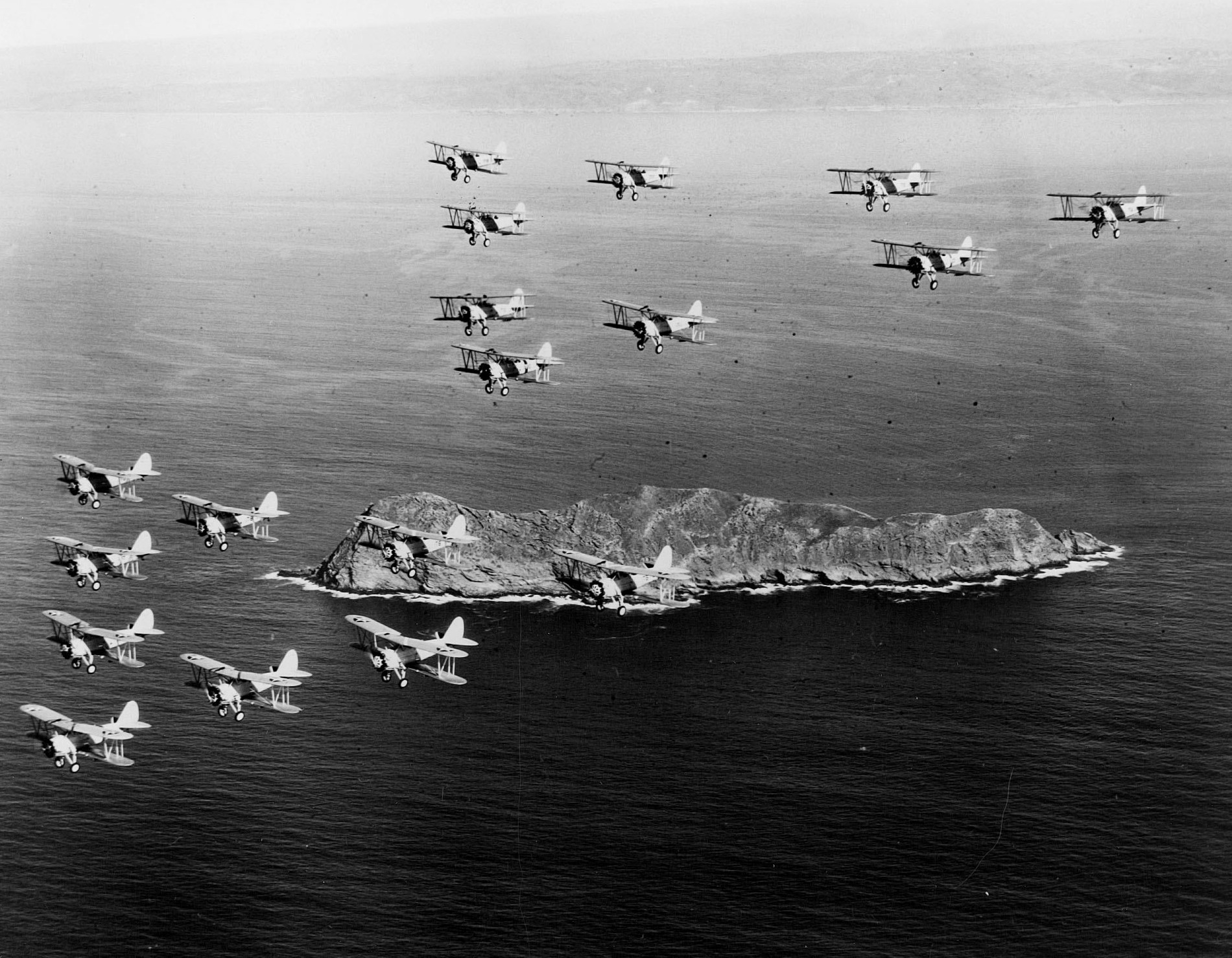
18 BM-1s and BM-2s from Torpedo Squadron 1 (VT-1S) off San Diego, California.

XT5M-1
Prototype with R-1690-22 engine, one built.
XT2N-1
Prototype built by Naval Aircraft Factory
BM-1
Production aircraft, 17 built.
BM-2
Production aircraft with minor changes, 16 built.
XBM-1
Additional aircraft for trials and testing, transferred to NACA in 1940.

== Operators ==
United States

- National Advisory Committee for Aeronautics
- United States Navy
  - VT-1S/VT-1B/VB-1B/VT-2 (1932–38)
  - VB-3B (1934–35)
  - VB-5 (1938)
  - VT-5 (1937–38)
  - VT-6 (1937–38)

== Accidents and incidents ==
Of the 35 aircraft built only seven were lost in accidents:

- 6 November 1931 BM-1 A8879 crashed during acceptance trials.
- 4 January 1933 BM-2 A9181 of the Scouting Force Pool force landed at Durham, North Carolina after it ran out of fuel.
- 27 August 1934 BM-1 A8888 of VB-1B force-landed in Arizona during bad weather and damaged beyond repair.
- 27 March 1935 BM-1 A8889 of VB-1B flew into the water during night operations from Lexington off California.
- 7 December 1936 BM-2 A9174 of VB-1B flew into the sea after it failed to recover from a practice dive.
- 12 March 1938 BM-1 A8880 of VT-5 crashed on landing at Hagerstown, Maryland.
- 19 April 1938 BM-1 A9217 of VB-5 had a landing accident when it overran and overturned at Virginia Beach.

== Specifications (BM-2) ==
Data from The Illustrated Encyclopaedia of Aircraft.

General characteristics

- Crew: two
- Length: 28 ft 9 in (8.76 m)
- Wingspan: 41 ft 0 in (12.5 m)
- Height: 12 ft 4 in (3.76 m)
- Wing area: 436 sq ft (40.5 m^{2})
- Empty weight: 3,662 lb (1,661 kg)
- Gross weight: 6,218 lb (2,820 kg)
- Powerplant: 1 × Pratt & Whitney R-1690-44 radial engine , 625 hp (466 kW)

Performance

- Maximum speed: 146 mph (235 km/h, 127 kn)
- Range: 413 mi (665 km, 359 nmi)
- Service ceiling: 16,800 ft (5,120 m)

Armament

- 2 x 0.3 in (7.62 mm) machine-guns (one forward-firing, one in rear cockpit)
- 1 x 1,000 lb (454 kg) Bomb or Torpedo
