= Parnall Pipit =

Pipit
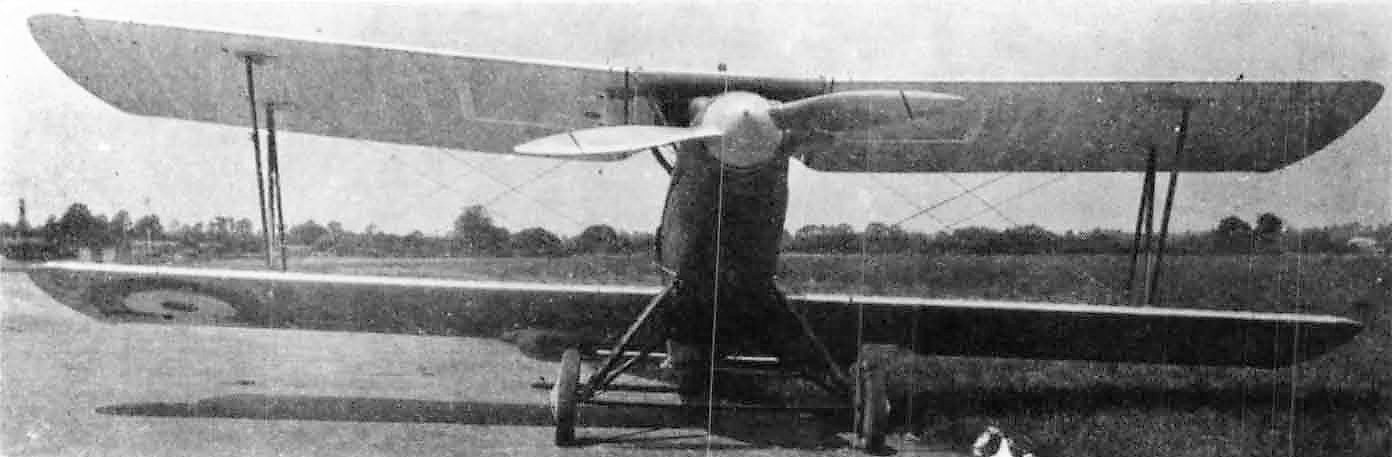

General information
- Type: Naval fighter
- National origin: United Kingdom
- Manufacturer: George Parnalll and Company
- Designer: Harold Bolas
- Number built: 2

History
- First flight: Summer 1928

The Parnall Pipit was a single-engined, single-seat naval fighter designed to a British Air Ministry specification in 1927. Two prototypes were built but both were destroyed by tail flutter.

== Design and development ==
The Pipit was Parnall's submission to Air Ministry specification 21/26, which called for a single-seat shipborne fighter. The same specification attracted a version of the Vickers 141, modified from the original landplane fighter and the private venture Hawker Hoopoe The specification required operation off deck or water.

The Pipit was a single-bay biplane with staggered, equal-span wings, unswept and of constant chord. The upper wing only carried dihedral; the ailerons were on the lower wing, extending over most of the span. There was a large rounded cutout in the upper wing over the cockpit for visibility, since the pilot's head was immediately below the trailing edge. Because of the stagger, he sat ahead of the lower trailing edge and so there were a pair of cutouts in the lower wings, a little way out from the roots, to assist downward vision. Apart from the stainless-steel N-shaped interplane struts, the wings were duralumin structures, fabric covered. The lower wing was fixed near the bottom of the fuselage and the upper one supported above it by four outward-leaning centre-section struts.

The Pipit's fuselage was constructed from stainless steel tubes braced with duralumin struts. The 495 hp (370 kW) Rolls-Royce F.XI watercooled V-12 was housed in a refined, streamlined aluminium cowling. Behind the cockpit the fuselage was fabric covered, as was the empennage, which had a stainless steel structure. The fin was tall and rounded, carrying a rudder which was neither aerodynamically nor dynamically balanced. The tailplane was attached at mid-fuselage and was rather rectangular, carrying split elevators which were horn balanced.

A retractable radiator, deployed via a handwheel in the cockpit, was mounted under the nose. When retracted this radiator warmed the cockpit and it was claimed that there would be no need for electrically heated clothing in the open cockpit, even at 20,000 ft (6,100 m) in winter. There were air vents for cooling the cockpit in summer and also a skin-type ancillary radiator built into the upper wing centre section surface. The land undercarriage was of the single-axle type, with forward-leaning oleo legs to the lower fuselage ahead of the leading edge and rearward struts. The wheels incorporated servo-assisted brakes operated from the rudder bar. The land- and seaplane undercarriages were designed to be rapidly interchangeable and shared the same attachment points, though the oleo legs were moved aft for the floats and there were additional bracing struts forward from their feet to the fuselage. The floats, linked by a pair of horizontal struts, were duralumin with a single step and water rudder.

The pilot's view was good, particularly over the nose, important for deck landings. The Pipit was armed with a pair of Vickers machine guns, mounted at seat level and firing via troughs in the fuselage sides.

The Pipit prototype, N232, first flew sometime in the summer of 1928. In October it flew to the A&AAE at RAF Martlesham Heath for official trials. During that month, the Pipit was put into a terminal-velocity dive during which tail flutter set in and became so violent that the tailplane spar fractured. The aircraft was a complete writeoff, but the pilot survived, despite a broken neck, to fly again. The loss was a severe blow to Parnall's, who had staked a lot on the hope of getting a production order for the promising Pipit. A second prototype was built, as the first but with distinguishing modifications. It was allocated the serial N233 but, confusingly, was painted with the same serial as the first prototype. The tailplane was now braced on each underside with a pair of struts, the fin and rudder had a less smoothly-rounded shape largely because of the addition of a large horn balance and there were now ailerons on all wings, linked between upper and lower planes by an external rod. This aircraft began testing at the Parnall factory field at Yate early in 1929, but on 24 February the Pipit encountered flutter strong enough to break the fin and rudder from the fuselage. The aircraft was lost, but the pilot escaped by parachute.

After the failure of the Pipit, Parnall never received a production order for a military aircraft and never submitted a front-line prototype again, though they did compete for the trainer specification Air Ministry specification T.1/37 with the Parnall Heck III. The Pipit crashes did contribute to a better understanding of flutter and how to prevent it, with wind-tunnel models and a detailed study of the two cases published in 1930. A subsequent and more general report came out of a research program which reported in 1931 with an emphasis on structural stiffness and above all careful mass (dynamic) balancing.

== Specifications ==
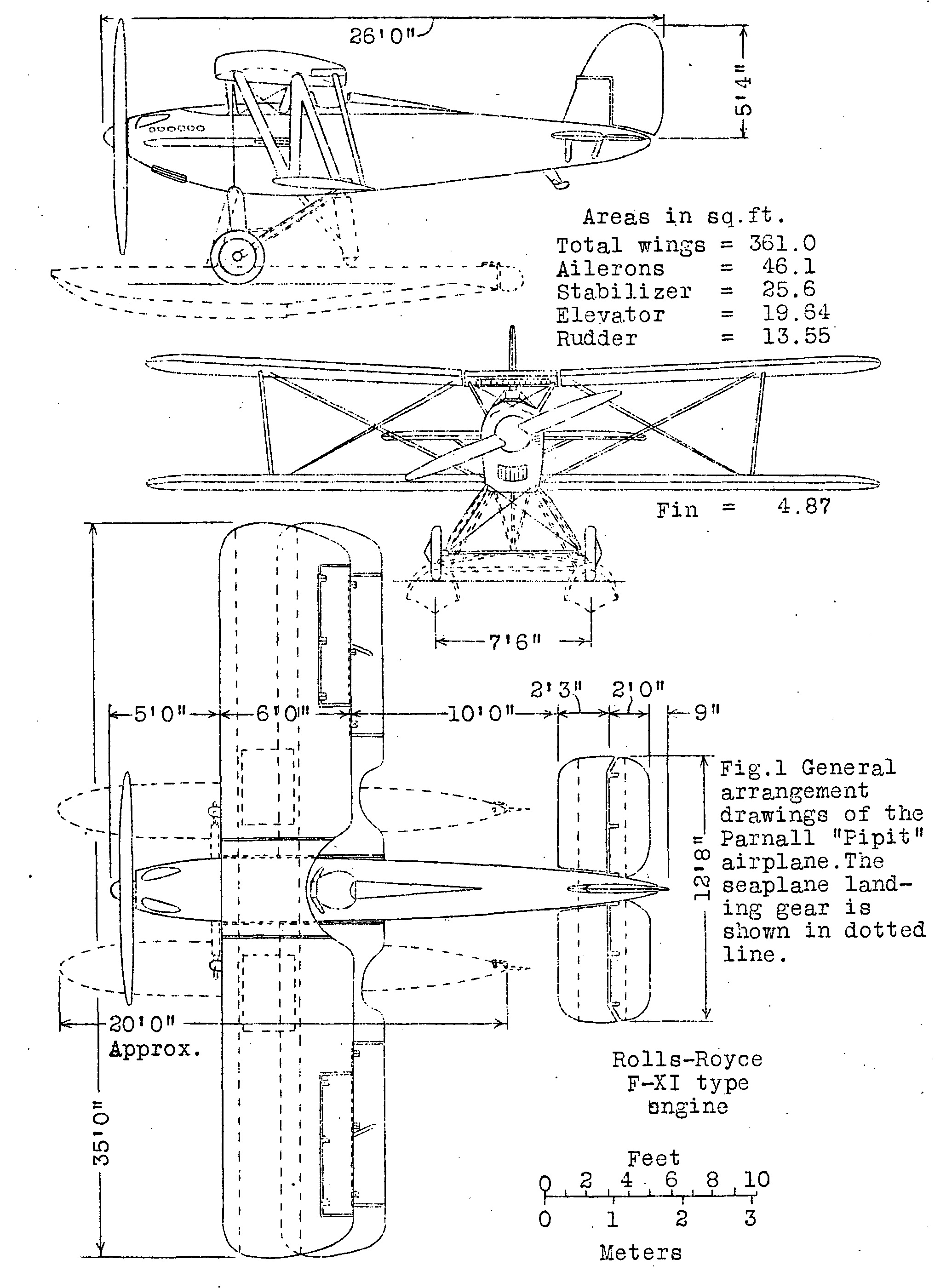
Parnall Pipit 3-view drawing from NACA Aircraft Circular No.99

Data from Wixey 1990, p. 175

General characteristics

- Crew: one
- Length: 26 ft 0 in (7.92 m)
- Wingspan: 35 ft 0 in (10.67 m)
- Height: 10 ft 5.5 in (3.188 m)
- Wing area: 361 sq ft (33.5 m^{2})
- Empty weight: 3,050 lb (1,383 kg)
- Gross weight: 3,980 lb (1,805 kg)
- Powerplant: 1 × Rolls-Royce F.XI , 495 hp (369 kW)

Performance

- Maximum speed: 173 mph (278 km/h, 150 kn) at 3,000 ft (914 m)
- Time to altitude: 10,000 ft (3,048 m) 7.5 min

Armament

- Guns: 2× 0.303 (7.7 mm) fixed, forward firing Vickers machine guns

== Notes ==
=== Cited sources ===
- Andrews, C. F.; Morgan, E. B. (1988). Vickers Aircraft since 1908 (2nd ed.). London: Putnam. ISBN 0-85177-815-1.
- Jarrett, Philip (1991). "The Pipit's Tail". Air Enthusiast. No. 44. pp. 26–35. ISSN 0143-5450.
- Mason, Francis K. (1971). Hawker Aircraft since 1920 (2nd ed.). London: Putnam. ISBN 0-370-00066-8.
- Wixey, Kenneth (1990). Parnall Aircraft since 1914. Annapolis: Naval Institute Press. ISBN 1-55750-930-1.
