= VFAW-3 =

All Weather Fighter Squadron 3
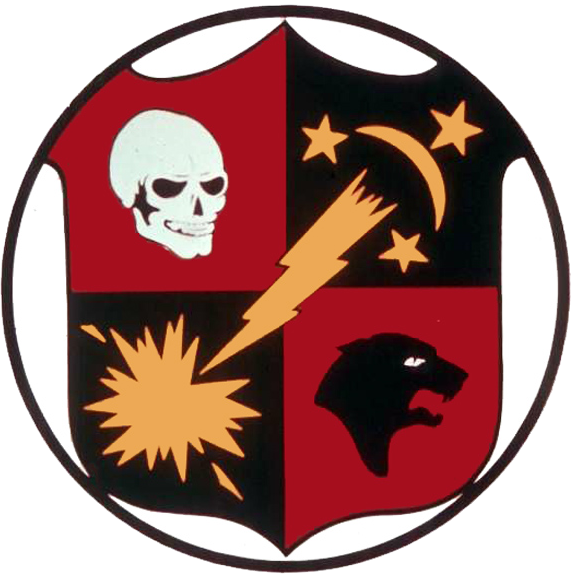
- Country: United States
- Branch: United States Navy
- Type: fighter
- Role: Night Fighter, Jet Transition Training, All Weather Interceptor
- Nickname: Blue Nemesis
- Engagements: Korean War; Second Taiwan Strait Crisis; Cuban Missile Crisis

All Weather Fighter Squadron 3 (VF(AW)-3) was a designation which was used by two separate U.S. Navy aviation squadrons. The first squadron to use the designation was established as Composite Squadron THREE (VC-3) on 20 May 1943, was redesignated All Weather Fighter Squadron THREE (VF(AW)-3) on 1 July 1956 and was disestablished on 2 May 1958. The second squadron to use the designation was established as "Navy Air Training Unit-Pacific (NATUPAC)" on 22 May 1944, was redesignated "Night Development Squadron Pacific (NightDevRonPac)" on 6 April 1946, then "Fighter All Weather Training Unit Pacific (FAWTUPAC)" on 1 September 1948 and finally, on the same day as the first squadron designated VF(AW)-3 was disestablished, 2 May 1958, was redesignated "All Weather Fighter Squadron THREE (VF(AW-3)". This second squadron to carry the VF(AW)-3 designation adopted the insignia and nickname "Blue Nemesis" from the first VF(AW)-3 and was the only U.S. Navy unit to be assigned to the North American Air Defense Command.

== History ==
=== First Squadron designated VF(AW)-3 ===
==== Korean War ====
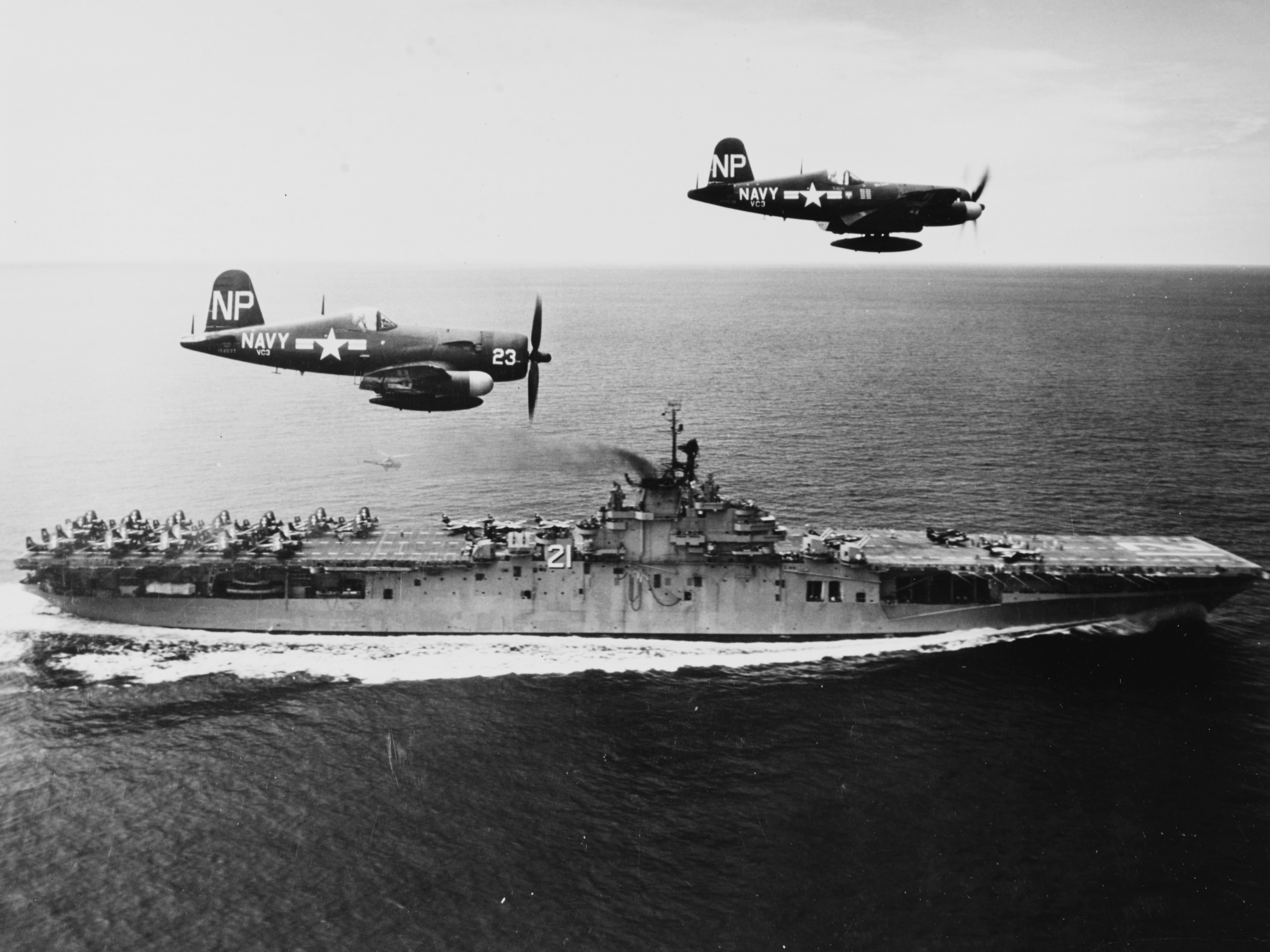
F4U-5N night fighters of VC-3 over USS Boxer (CV-21) during the Korean War.

Composite Squadron 3 (VC-3) Blue Nemesis was established on 20 May 1949. VC-3 provided night fighter detachments aboard the aircraft carriers of the Pacific Fleet, flying the F4U-5N Corsair. Its aircraft were heavily engaged in the Korean War, and Lt. Guy Bordelon of VC-3 became the only U.S. Navy "ace" during the war, after shooting down his fifth enemy plane on 16 July 1953, while detached ashore from the USS Princeton. After the war, the F2H-3 Banshee replaced the Corsair.

==== Transitional Training Unit ====
In August 1954 VC-3 assumed a new role as a transitional training unit transitioning fleet fighter squadrons into the latest high performance jet aircraft. It was the only squadron in the Navy to operate as such and was dubbed Cougar College, Cutlass Classroom, Fury Finishing School and Crusader College as it introduced the F9F-6 Cougar, F7U Cutlass, FJ Fury, F3H Demon, F4D Skyray, A4D Skyhawk and F8U Crusader to the fleet. On 1 July 1956 the squadron was redesignated All-Weather Fighter Squadron 3 (VF(AW)-3) but it continued performing the same transitional training role it had been performing since 1954. The squadron was disestablished on 2 May 1958 when the specialized transitional training the squadron performed was no longer needed.

=== Second Squadron designated VF(AW)-3 ===
==== Night Fighter Development and Training ====
The second squadron designated VF(AW)-3 was established on 22 May 1944 as the "Navy Air Training Unit-Pacific (NATUPAC)" at Naval Air Station Barbers Point, Hawaii. Following World War II, it was redesignated "Night Development Squadron Pacific" on 6 April 1946. Two years later, it was redesignated "Fighter All Weather Training Unit Pacific (FAWTUPAC)". Among other aircraft flown by the squadron was the Navy's first jet powered, radar equipped carrier based night fighter, the F3D-2 Skyknight. In 1957, the squadron began transitioning to the F4D-1 Skyray, receiving its first six aircraft during that year. When the transition was complete, the squadron was equipped with 25 F4Ds, based at Naval Air Station North Island at San Diego, California.

==== Continental Air Defense role ====
On 2 May 1958 when the transitional training unit designated VF(AW)-3 was disestablished, Fleet All Weather Training Unit Pacific was redesignated All Weather Fighter Squadron 3 (VF(AW)-3) and it along with its F4D Skyrays assumed a continental air defense role assigned to the 27th Air Division of the United States Air Force at Norton Air Force Base.

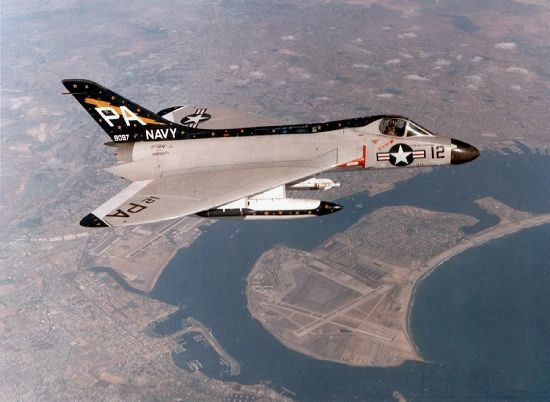
A VF(AW)-3 F4D-1 "Ford" over San Diego.

Radar coverage was provided by an Air Force early warning radar site on Mount Laguna, code-named "Anderson." In the late 1950s, the squadron averaged one or two actual scrambles and two or three training sorties per day. VF(AW)-3 consistently outperformed USAF interceptor squadrons in scramble time and intercept effectiveness. VFAW-3 won NORAD's "best performing unit" trophy, twice. The squadron also maintained an excellent safety record and superb aircraft-readiness rates. It benefitted in these fields from the proximity of the Douglas factory in Los Angeles.

After "Anderson" identified a target, VF(AW)-3 routinely scrambled two F4Ds in three minutes. In an emergency, all 25 aircraft could be scrambled in less than two hours. The Air Force radar vectored the aircraft to within 45 km of the contact, and the F4Ds completed the intercepts using their onboard radar, attempting to identify the contact without its being aware of their presence.

On 29 March 1957, LtCdr Patrick F. Cunningham had an in-flight emergency and had to bail out of his A4D-1 fighter (BuNo 139924) over San Joaquin Valley, California. In response to the Second Taiwan Strait Crisis, VF(AW)-3 aircraft deployed to Taiwan in 1958.

==== Cuban Missile Crisis ====
After the Cuban Revolution, VF(AW)-3 also provided a detachment of six aircraft ("Detachment Echo") at Naval Air Station Key West, Florida, in 1961, under control of the Continental Air Defense Command (CONAD). The crews were rotated every eight weeks. In January 1962, after Cuba had received Mikoyan-Gurevich MiG-21 fighters, VF(AW)-3 kept four F4Ds on five-minute alert at all times.

From 24 October to 31 December 1962, Detachment Echo of VF(AW)-3 received the Armed Forces Expeditionary Medal for participating in the Cuban Missile Crisis of 1962; at NAS Key West.

VF(AW)-3 was disestablished in April 1963.

== Aircraft ==
Grumman F8F-1 Bearcat

- 1946 - 1948

Grumman F7F-3 Tigercat

- 1946 - 1948

Ryan FR-1 Fireball

- 1946 - 1949

F3D-2 Skyknight

- 1953 - 1958

Douglas F4D-1 Skyray

- 16 April 1956 - 1963 through April 1963 - NAS North Island, San Diego, CA (tailcode PA 1945-1963)

Douglas A-4 Skyhawk

- 1956-1957 - NAS Moffett Field, CA

== See also ==
- History of the United States Navy
- List of inactive United States Navy aircraft squadrons
- List of United States Navy aircraft squadrons
