= 113 Squadron =

113 Squadron or 113th Squadron may refer to:

- 113 Squadron (Israel), a unit of the Israeli Air Force
- No. 113 Squadron RAF, a unit of the United Kingdom Royal Air Force
- VFA-113 (Strike Fighter Squadron 113), a unit of the United States Navy
- VMF-113 (Marine Fighter Squadron 113), a unit of the United States Marine Corps
- 113th Intelligence Squadron (United States), a unit of the United States Air Force
