= Guy Bordelon =

American flying ace (1922–2002)

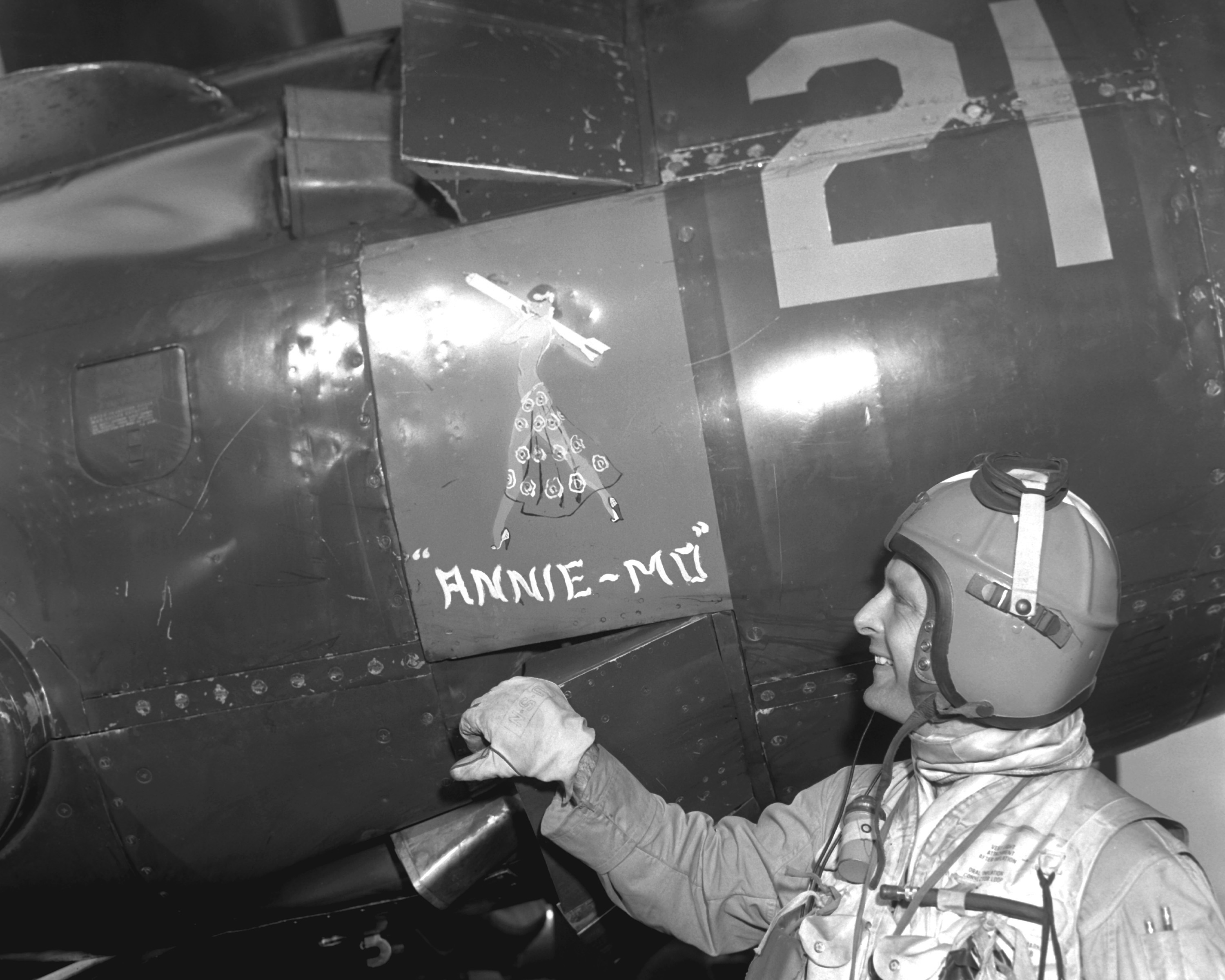
- Lieutenant Guy Bordelon in Korea, 1953
- Born: February 1, 1922; Ruston, Louisiana, US
- Died: December 19, 2002 (aged 80); Alexandria, Louisiana, US
- Military career
- Allegiance: United States
- Branch: United States Navy
- Service years: 1942–1969
- Rank: Commander
- Nickname: "Lucky Pierre"
- Conflicts: World War II; Korean War
- Awards: Navy Cross; Silver Star (2)

Guy Pierre Bordelon Jr. (February 1, 1922 – December 19, 2002) was a United States Navy flying ace during the Korean War, shooting down five enemy aircraft. Bordelon was the only U.S. Navy aviator to become an ace in the war.

A veteran of World War II, then-Lieutenant Guy Bordelon was the leader of VC-3 Detachment D off the USS Princeton. In addition to being the Korean War's only navy ace, he was the only night ace and the only American ace to do so flying a piston engined aircraft, the F4U Corsair. Bordelon, nicknamed "Lucky Pierre", was credited with three Lavochkin La-9s or La-11s, and two Yak-18s between 29 June and 16/17 July 1953.

Bordelon became an instructor after Korea, and taught survival training to pilots during the Vietnam War. He was also chosen for the prestigious Top Gun award. Guy Bordelon retired as a commander after 27 years in the U.S. Navy, returning to his home town of Ruston, Louisiana. He died in 2002 at the age of 80.

== See also ==
- List of Korean War flying aces
- List of Navy Cross recipients for the Korean War
