= Douglas F3D Skyknight =

U.S. twinjet night fighter aircraft (1951–1970)

F3D (F-10) Skyknight
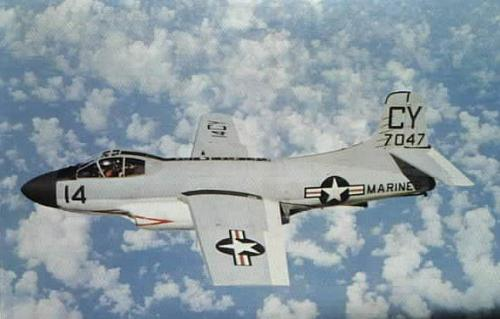
- EF-10B Skyknight of VMCJ-2 Playboys

General information
- Type: Fighter aircraft
- National origin: United States
- Manufacturer: Douglas Aircraft Company
- Status: Retired
- Primary users: United States Navy United States Marine Corps
- Number built: 265

History
- Introduction date: 1951
- First flight: 23 March 1948
- Retired: 1970
- Developed into: Douglas F6D Missileer

The Douglas F3D Skyknight (later redesignated F-10 Skyknight) is an American twin-engined, mid-wing jet fighter aircraft designed and manufactured by the Douglas Aircraft Company.

It was designed in response to a 1945 United States Navy requirement for a jet-powered, radar-equipped, carrier-based night fighter. Douglas designed the aircraft around the bulky air intercept radar systems of the era, resulting in a wide, deep, and roomy fuselage that accommodated its two-man crew. An initial contract was issued to Douglas on 3 April 1946. The XF3D-1 prototype performed its maiden flight on 23 March 1948. During June 1948, a production contract for 28 F3D-1 production aircraft was received. It was equipped with a Westinghouse AN/APQ-35 fire control system, which incorporated three separate radars and was an essential component of its night fighter operations.

The F3D saw service with the United States Navy and United States Marine Corps. Its primary mission was to locate and destroy enemy aircraft at night. The Skyknight was not produced in great numbers, yet it achieved numerous firsts in its role as a night fighter during the Korean War, where the type frequently escorted Boeing B-29 Superfortresses on night bombing missions. While it never achieved the fame of the North American F-86 Sabre, it downed several Soviet-built MiG-15s as a night fighter over Korea. It suffered only a single air-to-air loss against a Chinese MiG-15, which occurred on the night of 29 May 1953. A total of 237 F3D-2s were completed before production was terminated on 23 March 1952.

The Skyknight played an important role in the development of the radar-guided AIM-7 Sparrow missile, which led to further guided air-to-air missile developments. It also served as an electronic warfare platform in the Vietnam War as a precursor to the EA-6A Intruder and EA-6B Prowler. The aircraft is sometimes unofficially called "Skynight", dropping the second "k". The unusual, portly profile earned it the nickname "Willie the Whale". Some Vietnam War U.S. Marine veterans have referred to the Skyknight as "Drut", whose meaning becomes obvious when read backwards. This may be in reference to its age, unflattering looks, or the low-slung air intakes that made it vulnerable to foreign object damage (FOD).

== Design and development ==
=== Origins ===
The F3D was not intended to be a typical sleek and nimble dogfighter, but as a standoff night fighter, being outfitted with a powerful radar system and a second crew member. It originated in 1945 with a US Navy requirement for a jet-powered, radar-equipped, carrier-based night fighter. The Douglas team led by Ed Heinemann designed the aircraft around the bulky air intercept radar systems of the time, placing the pilot and radar operator in side-by-side seating. The result was an aircraft with a wide, deep, and roomy fuselage. Aviation author Joe Copalman observed that the F3D was a relatively conventional aircraft, despite its use of jet propulsion, the design team having opted for features such as a straight wing and traditional tail unit.

A large and relatively flat forward windshield was used; while not conducive to high speed flight, it provided distortion-free external visibility, something that was particularly valued for a night fighter at that time. The design team opted not to use tip tanks due to the fuselage already permitting sufficient fuel capacity and the difficulty involved in properly combining the tanks with a folding wing mechanism. The use of ejection seats was also considered but decided against as their inclusion would have necessitated a jettisonable canopy, made pressurizing the cockpit more difficult, and added weight. Instead, an escape tunnel was used, similar to the arrangement used in the Douglas A-3 Skywarrior. The stick was extendable so that more force could be exerted upon it by the pilot as a fallback measure in the event of a hydraulic failure.

The XF3D-1 was selected over a competing submission, Grumman Aircraft Engineering Corporation's G-75 twin-seat, four-engined, Westinghouse J30-powered night fighter design (similar layout to their Tigercat), leading to an initial contract being issued on 3 April 1946. The US Navy's Bureau of Aeronautics (BuAer) also issued a contract to Grumman for two G-75s (BuAer designation XF9F-1) experimental aircraft on 11 April 1946 in case the Skyknight encountered problems. Shortly thereafter, Grumman recognised that the G-75 would not be a successful aircraft, instead, the company had been working on a completely different single-engined day fighter, initially known as the G-79; it would later become the Grumman F9F Panther. (Note: Rather than cancel the G-75 (XF9F-1) contract, BuAer changed the wording to include three entirely different G-79 prototypes. The G-79 became the successful Grumman F9F Panther.)

=== Into flight ===
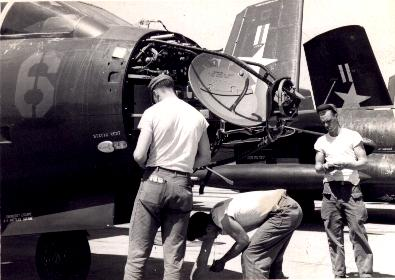
Maintenance on an APQ-35 radar of an F3D-2 in Korea, 1953

On 23 March 1948, the XF3D-1 performed its maiden flight from Douglas' El Segundo facility with test pilot Russell Thaw at the controls. (Note: Russell Thaw as a test pilot for Douglas. Besides the F3D, he was responsible for many test programs, including the Douglas XB-43 Jetmaster and Douglas XF4D-1 Skyray.) While wind tunnel testing had indicated the need for aerodynamic changes, such as the addition of wing fences, flight testing provided these to be unnecessary. Flight testing continued at El Segundo up until October 1948, after which the three prototypes were transported to Muroc Air Force Base (later renamed Edwards Air Force Base) to participate in service trials. These units were powered by a pair of Westinghouse J34-WE-24 turbojets, capable of 3,000 lbf (13 kN) thrust, which were installed underneath the roots of then-standard straight wings of the early jet era. During June 1948, a production contract for 28 F3D-1 production aircraft, powered by improved J34-WE-32 engines, was issued; relatively little external changes were made between the prototype and production aircraft, save for the enlargement of the engine nacelles. The first production aircraft made its first flight on 13 February 1950. That same month, shore-based testing was concluded.

As a night fighter that was not expected to be as fast as smaller daylight fighters, the expectation was to have a stable platform for its radar system and the four 20 mm cannon mounted in the lower fuselage. Yet, the F3D was capable of outturning a MiG-15 jet fighter. The fire control system in the F3D-1 was the Westinghouse AN/APQ-35. The AN/APQ-35 was advanced for the time, a combination of three different radars, each performing separate functions: an AN/APS-21 search radar, an AN/APG-26 tracking radar, both located in the nose, and an AN/APS-28 tail warning radar. The AN/APS-21 was capable of detecting aircraft at distances up to 20 miles away while the AN/APG-26 could achieve a weapons lock up to 2.25 miles away and the AN/APS-28 was effective up to 10 miles away. The complexity of this vacuum tube-based radar system, produced before the advent of semiconductor electronics, required intensive maintenance to keep it operating properly.

The F3D-1 was followed by the F3D-2, which was first ordered in August 1949. This model was intended to have Westinghouse J46 engines in enlarged nacelles to replace the J34-WE-32 engines of the F3D-1; however, on account of development problems with the J46, the F3D-2 was initially fitted with J34-WE-36 engines instead. Higher-thrust J34-WE-38 engines were installed later, noticeably increasing the aircraft's performance. Additional changes on the F3D-2 included the incorporation of an improved Westinghouse AN/APQ-36 fire control system, autopilot, air conditioning, and a bulletproof windscreen. A total of 237 F3D-2s were built prior to production being terminated on 23 March 1952. At one stage, a higher performance F3D-3 variant, equipped with swept wings and J46 engines, was planned, yet work was cancelled after the J46's development was so troublesome that officials opted to terminate work.

== Operational history ==
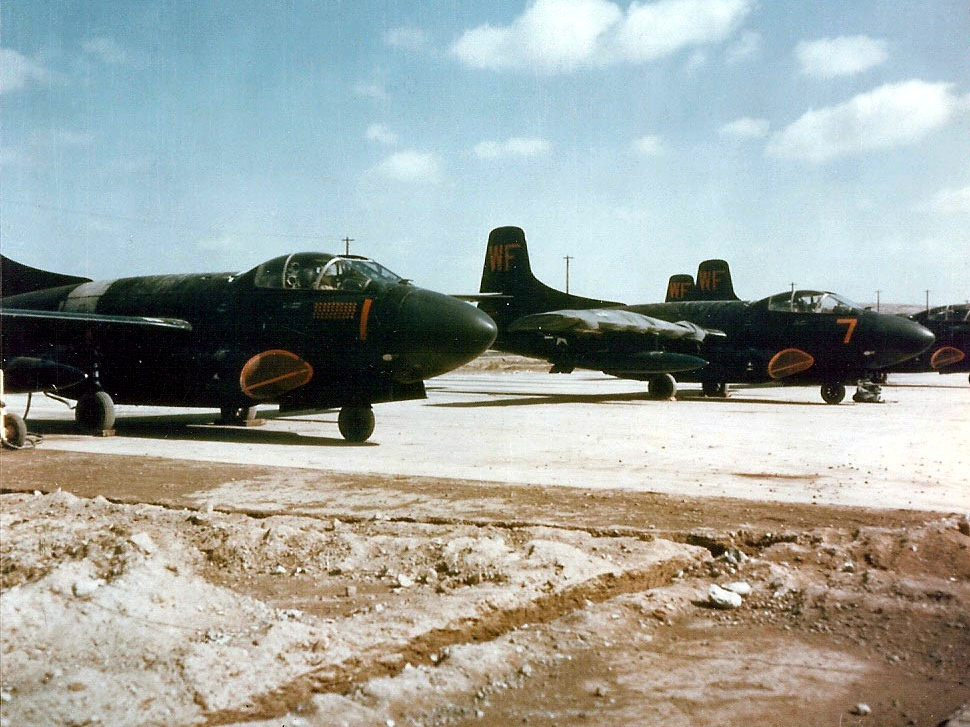
F3D-2s of VMFN-513 at Kunsan Air Base, Korea, in 1953

=== Korean War ===
The 28 F3D-1s produced were primarily used to train F3D crews; as such, this model did not see combat in the Korean War. The F3D-2 Skyknight was only operated in the Korean theatre by United States Marine Corps (USMC) land–based squadrons, beginning in August 1952. The first aircraft to arrive in Korea were initially unable to commence operations due to a lack of gun barrel extensions, which were necessary to fire the aircraft's cannons safely; the first aircraft to be modified was on 9 August 1952, permitting live operations to commence in the following weeks. Prior to this, exercises were conducted to develop closer coordination with ground controllers, upon whom the F3D-2s were dependent during their night time operations.

From the onset of operations, hostile jamming from inside North Korea proved to be effective against onboard radar. This factor contributed to Skyknight pilots often experiencing difficulty when attempting to close in, identify, and lock onto suspected hostile aircraft. Ground-based anti-aircraft artillery, which was often equipped with radar-guided search lights, proved to be more of a threat to night time operations over Korea than the occasional MiG-15; such aircraft often acted as bait, attempting to draw the Skyknights into coordinated traps. According to Copalman, the AN/APS-28 tail warning radar unit proved quite advantageous in terms of situational awareness.

The Skyknight was responsible for downing more enemy aircraft over Korea than any other single type of naval aircraft. The first air-to-air victory was recorded on the night of 2 November 1952 by a USMC F3D-2 piloted by Major William T. Stratton Jr., and his radar operator, Master Sergeant Hans C. Hoglind of VMF(N)-513 Flying Nightmares, Major Stratton shot down what he believed was a Yakovlev Yak-15 (even though no Yak-15s were reported in Korea) which was the first successful night radar interception by a jet of another jet. The Skyknight claimed its first MiG-15 kill on 8 November 1952, when Captain O.R. Davis and Warrant Officer D.F. "Ding" Fessler downed a MiG-15 northwest of Pyongyang. USMC pilot Lt. Joseph Corvi and his radar operator Sergeant Dan George set another record with the Skyknight on the night of 10 December 1952, when they downed the first aircraft by an aircraft with a radar track and lock-on and without visual contact. They performed the feat by using their radar to lock onto a Polikarpov Po-2 biplane. They were also credited with another probable kill that night.

In January 1953, the number of USMC Skyknights in Korea was doubled to 24; this increase allowed them to effectively escort B-29 Superfortresses on night bombing missions. On 12 January 1953, an F3D-2 of VMF(N)-513 that was escorting B-29s on a night bombing mission was vectored to a contact and shot down the fourth aircraft by a Skyknight. By the end of the war, Skyknights had claimed six enemy aircraft (one Polikarpov Po-2, one Yakovlev Yak-15 and four MiG-15s).

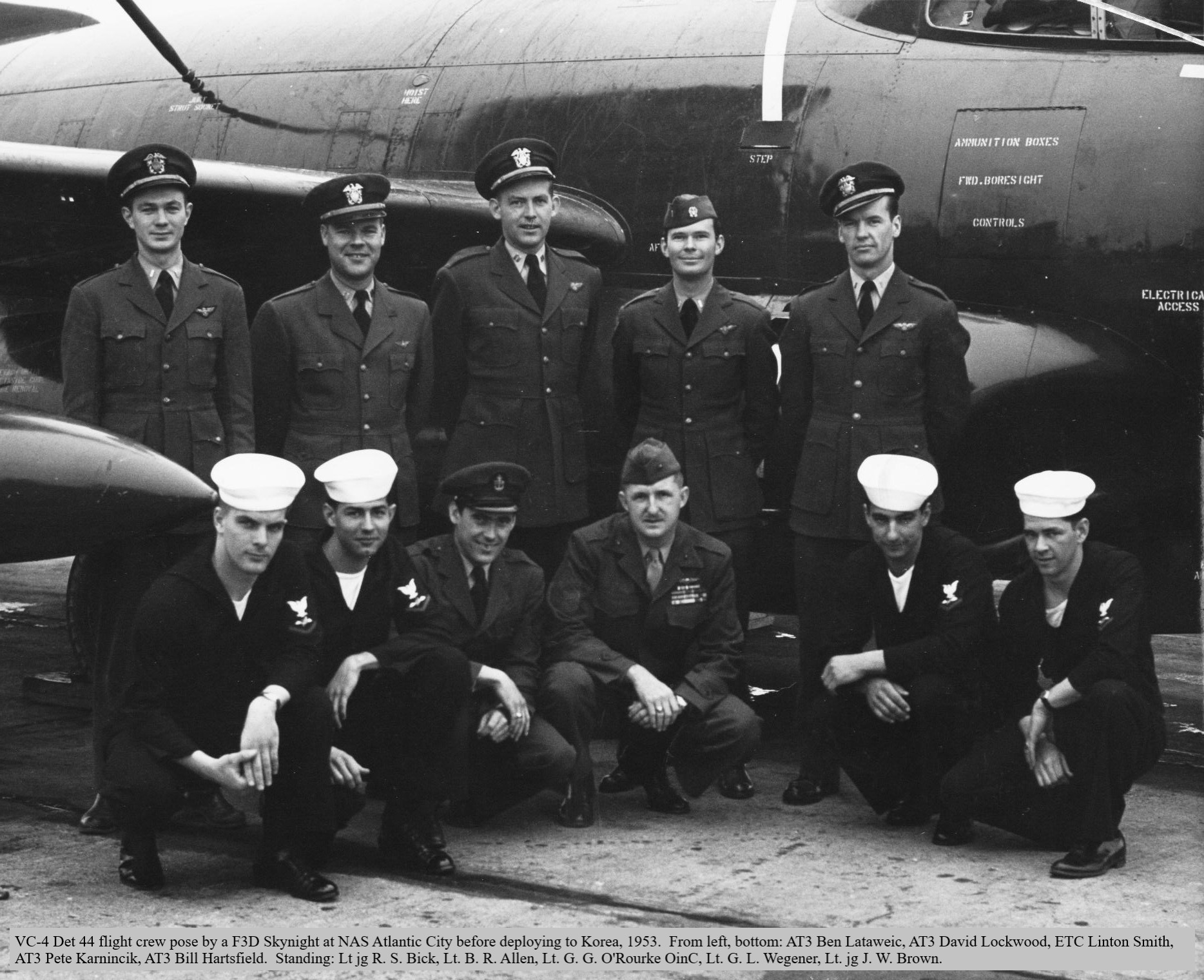
Squadron members of VC4 (DET44N) at NAS Atlantic City, prior to Korean deployment with Carrier Air Group 4

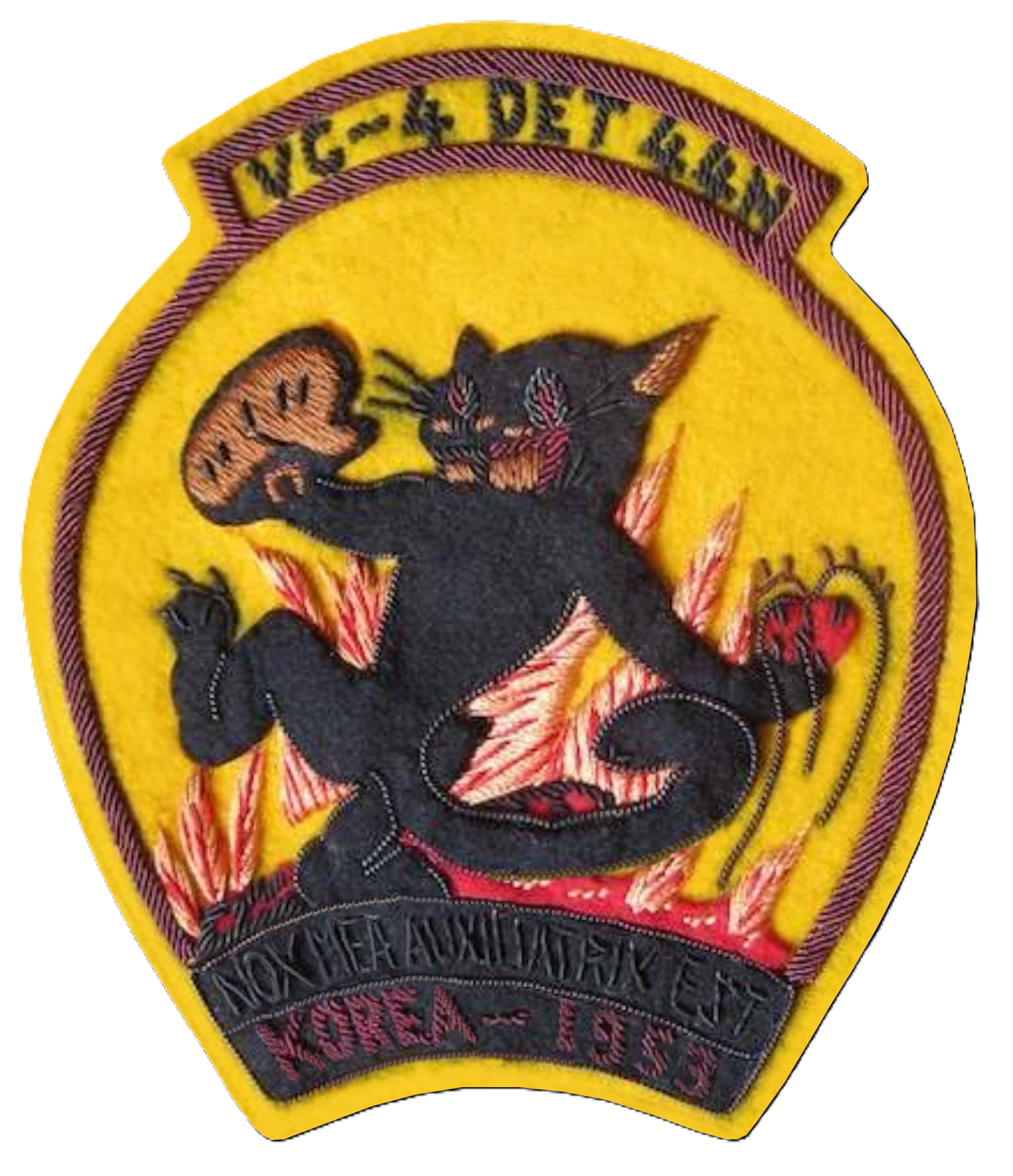
VC-4 DET 44(N) Squadron Patch during Korea Deployment

In May 1953, Composite Squadron 4 Detachment 44N was deployed to Korea via the U.S.S. Lake Champlain. They sailed through the Mediterranean Sea and on to the eastern Korean coast. After arriving, VC-4 flew a few patrols from the ship, but it was soon apparent that the planes were not well suited for the ships wooden deck. The exhaust nozzles on the F3D were angled slightly down and during take-off, the jet's exhaust scorched the teakwood deck of the ship. After each take-off the deck hands would rush out onto the deck and put out the smoldering fires. After several of these fire drills, the Ship's Captain insisted that VC-4 be transferred to the mainland and join up with VMF(N) 513.

On 23 June 1953, VC4 (DET44N) joined with VMF(N) 513 at K-6 Airbase south of Seoul. The mission of VC-4 DET44N as directed by Commander Task Force NINETY-ONE and as employed as an integral part of Marine All Weather Fighter Squadron 513 based ashore, providing night fighter escort for U.S. Air Force medium bomber (B-50) strikes on targets in North Korea and providing night combat air patrols in the Chodo Island area, extending from the Haeju peninsula to the Yalu River.

One F3D, piloted by LTJG Bob Bick and his RO, Chief Petty Officer Linton Smith, was lost to enemy fire on 2 July 1953. This aircraft was part of the detachment from Fleet Composite Squadron FOUR (VC-4) at NAS Atlantic City.

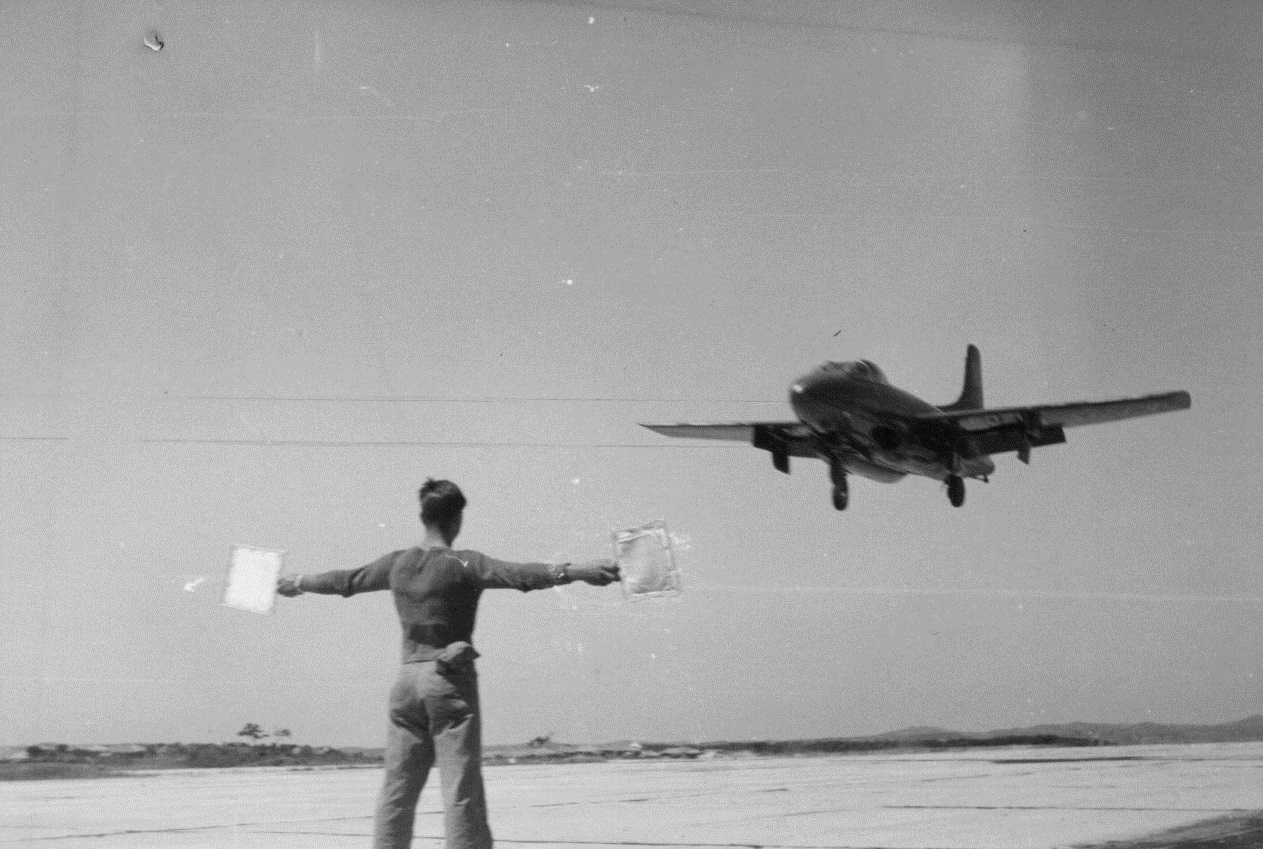
F3D-2 Landing at K6 Airbase, Korea 1952

Operational Comments June 1953 through July 1953 The following are excerpts from Carrier Air Group FOUR, Action Report of VC-4 Detachment 44N for period 19 June 1953 to 27 July 1953.

1. The radar equipment in the F3D-2 is excellent, however the relatively low speed and slow rate of climb of the aircraft prohibits exploiting the advantage of the excellent radar coverage against high speed enemy jets.

2. The extreme visibility of the glow from the engines' tailpipes offers an easy target for a pursuer and a detriment to the evasiveness of the aircraft.

3. The near vertical forward windshield and the lack of windshield wipers, limits the visibility of the pilot, on a final GCA approach in heavy rain, to the curved side panel. Under such conditions of heavy rain, forward visibility is extremely poor.

While the Skyknight lacked the swept wings and high subsonic performance of the MiG-15, its powerful fire control system enabled it to find and shoot down other fighters at night, while most MiG-15s could only be guided by ground-based radar.

=== Post Korean War ===
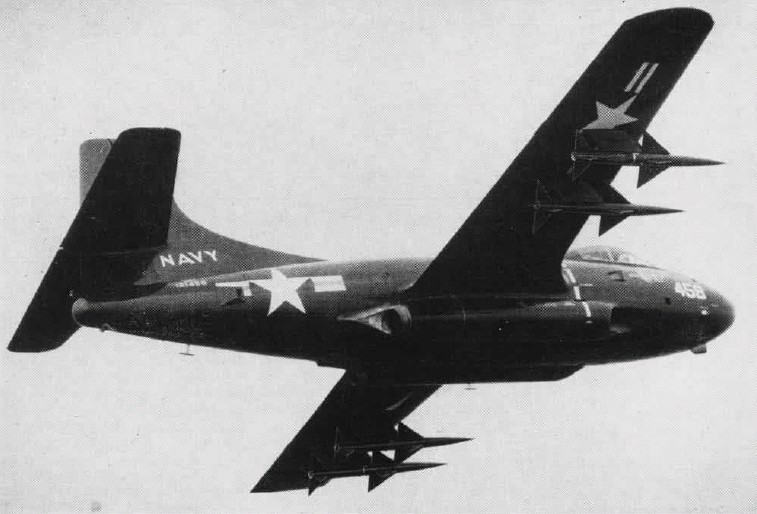
F3D–1 Skyknight carrying AAM-N-2 Sparrow I missiles during tests in the early 1950s

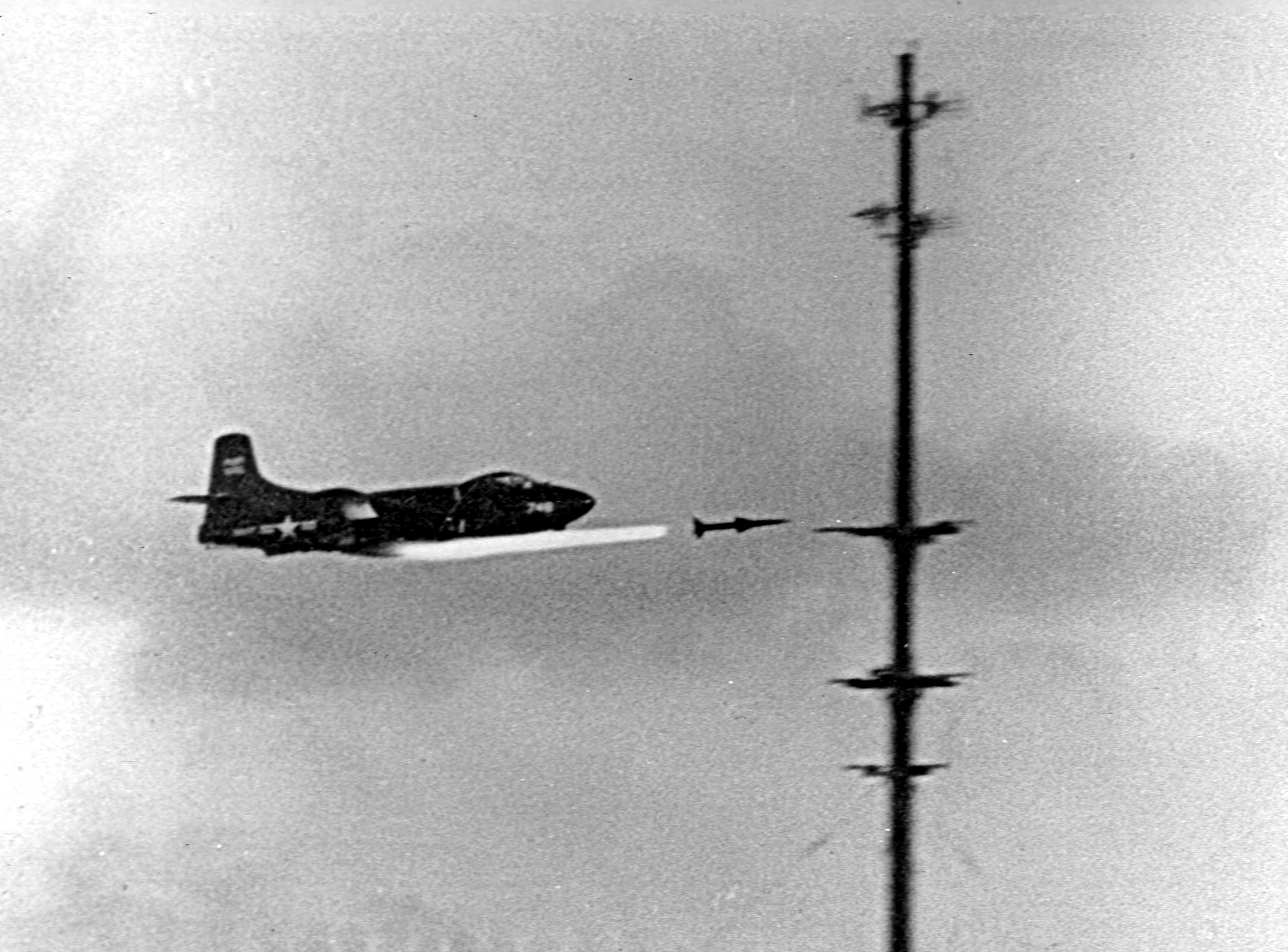
F3D–1 Skyknight firing a AAM-N-2 Sparrow I missile during a test in 1950

Following the Korean War, the F3D was gradually replaced by more powerful aircraft with better radar systems. Its stability and spacious fuselage made the aircraft easily adaptable to other roles. The F3D (under the designations F3D-1M and F3D-2M) was used to support development of a number of air-to-air missile systems during the 1950s, including the Sparrow I, II, and III and Meteor missiles. The Sparrow missile was developed at Pacific Missile Test Center and early test firings were conducted at Naval Ordnance Test Station China Lake. During 1954, the F3D-2M became the first Navy jet aircraft to be fitted with an operational air-to-air missile, the Sparrow I, an all weather day/night beyond-visual-range missile that used beam riding guidance for the aircrew to control the missile's track. Only 28 aircraft (12 F3D-1Ms, and 16 F3D-2Ms) were modified to use the missiles.

In the late 1950s, a number of Marine F3D-2s were re-configured as electronic warfare aircraft and were accordingly redesignated F3D-2Q (later EF-10B). Several aircraft were also converted for use as trainers and were thus redesignated F3D-2T. Some of these aircraft were outfitted with a single 10" photography camera, mounted in the tail section, for aerial reconnaissance.

During 1959, Ed Heinemann proposed that Douglas refurbish retired F3Ds for civil use, reasoning that the former military aircraft could be offered at a much lower price than newly designed business jets such as the Lockheed JetStar. Some work on the initiative was undertaken, but it was canceled after it was determined that the stored aircraft were in a generally poor condition, making their refurbishment more costly than forecast.

When the U.S. Navy issued a requirement for a fleet defense missile fighter in 1959, Douglas responded with the F6D Missileer, which was essentially an updated and enlarged F3D that would carry the AAM-N-10 Eagle long-range air-to-air missile, with its most important characteristics being its large fuel capacity, its considerable time-on-station, a crew of two and sophisticated electronics, rather than speed or maneuverability. This concept, which retained the straight wings in an age of supersonic combat aircraft, was soon cancelled as it was felt that the aircraft would not be able to effectively defend itself against more nimble fighters. The supersonic General Dynamics-Grumman F-111B was subsequently developed to carry long-range missiles, was cancelled due to excessive weight and changing tactical requirements. The Grumman F-14 Tomcat later entered service in this role.

Skyknights continued in service through the 1960s in a gull white color scheme, by which point many of their contemporaries had long since been retired. During 1962, at which point the U.S. Navy and U.S. Air Force unified their designation systems, the F3D-1 was redesignated F-10A while the F3D-2 was redesignated F-10B.

=== Vietnam War ===
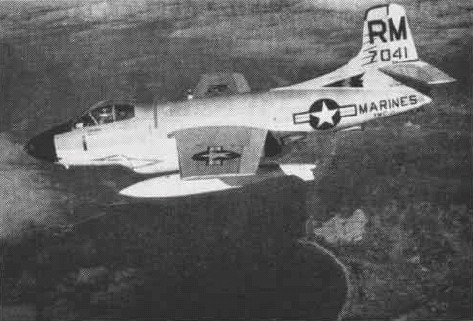
EF-10B (BuNo 127041) of VMCJ-1 over Vietnam in 1966. This aircraft was downed by an SA-2 missile from the North Vietnamese 61st Battalion, 236th Missile Regiment over Nghe An province on 18 March 1966 (coordinates 191958N 1050959E). The crew, 1stLt Brent Davis and 1stLt Everett McPherson, were killed.

The Skyknight was the only Korean War jet fighter that also flew in Vietnam. EF-10Bs served in the Electronic warfare role during the Vietnam War until 1969. The large interior provided ample room for electronic equipment. U.S. Marine Marine Composite Reconnaissance Squadron One (VMCJ-1) Golden Hawks began operating the EF-10B on 17 April 1965 under Lt. Col Wes Corman at Da Nang Air Base Republic of Vietnam with six aircraft. No more than 10 EF-10Bs were in Vietnam at one time. The Electronic Warfare Skyknight was a valuable Electronic countermeasure asset to jam the SA-2 surface-to-air missiles tracking and guidance systems. VMCJ-1 made history when its EF-10Bs conducted the first USMC airborne radar jamming mission on 29 April 1965 to support a USAF strike mission. On 27 July 1965, four EF-10Bs also supported a massive strike on missile sites outside Hanoi.

Many U.S. aircraft were lost to SA-2s in Vietnam. The electronic attack on the associated radar systems was known as "Fogbound" missions. The F3D also dropped chaff over the radar sites. The first EF-10B lost in Vietnam was to an SA-2 on 18 March 1966, while four more EF-10Bs were lost in Vietnam to accidents and unknown causes. Their mission was gradually assumed by the more capable EA-6A "Electric Intruder", an Electronic Warfare/Electronic Countermeasures (EW/ECM) variant of the Grumman A-6 Intruder attack bomber. The EF-10B Skyknight continued to fly lower–threat EW missions until they were withdrawn from South Vietnam in October 1969. The U.S. Navy's EKA-3 Skywarrior and the USAF's Douglas RB-66 Destroyer also assumed electronic missions.

During May 1970, the U.S. Marine Corps retired the last of its EF-10Bs.

=== Post Vietnam ===
The U.S. Navy continued to use the F-10s for avionics systems testing. The F-10 was used as a radar testbed to develop the APQ-72 radar. The nose of an F-4 Phantom was added to the front of an F-10B. Another F-10 had a modified radome installed by the radar manufacturer Westinghouse. Yet another TF-10B was modified with the nose from an A-4 Skyhawk. In 1968, three Skyknights were transferred to the U.S. Army. These aircraft were operated by the Raytheon Corporation at Holloman AFB where they were used testing at the White Sands Missile Range into the 1980s; they were the last flyable Skyknights.

== Variants ==
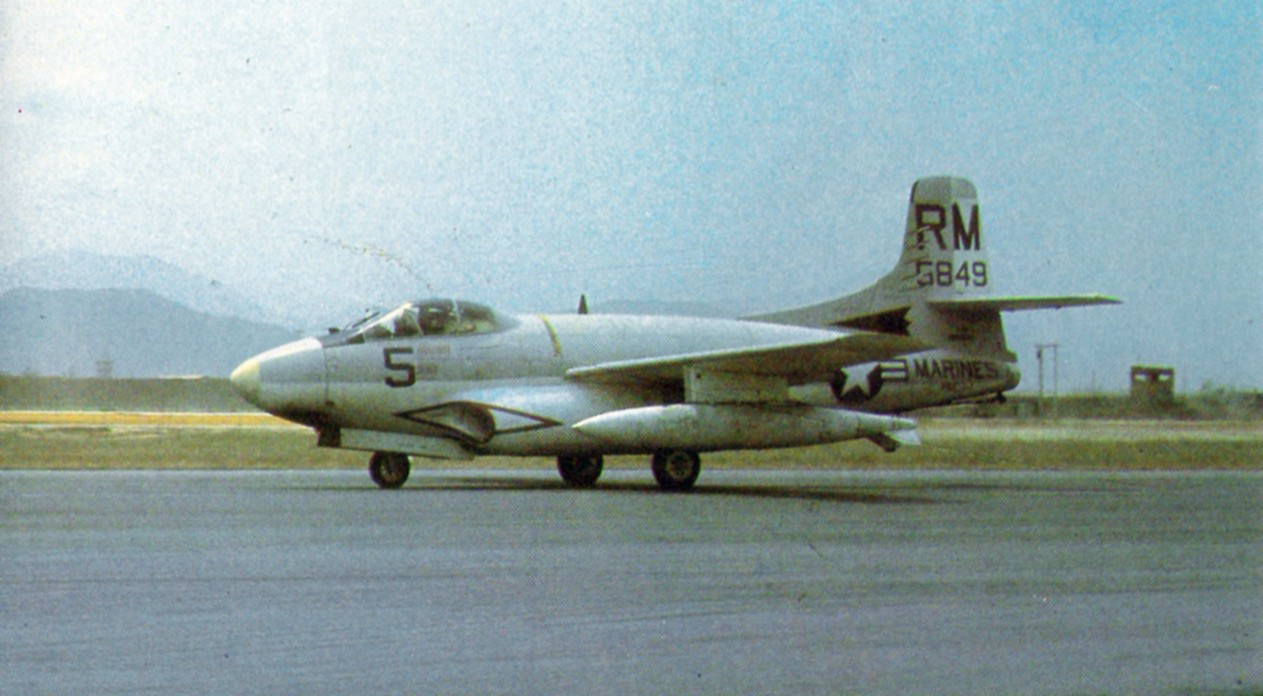
EF-10B Skyknight of VMCJ-1 at Da Nang, South Vietnam, in the second half of the 1960s

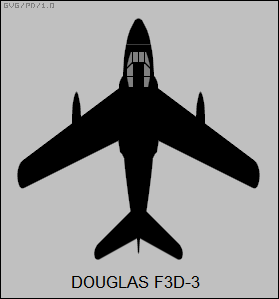
Proposed F3D-3 swept-wing variant

XF3D-1
Prototype aircraft, two Westinghouse J34-WE-24 turbojet engines of 3,000 lbf (13 kN), APQ-35 search and target acquisition radar, four 20mm cannon, three built.
F3D-1
Two-seat all-weather day or night-fighter aircraft, powered by two 3,000 lbf (13 kN) Westinghouse J34-WE-32 turbojet engines, tail warning radar, ECM, and other electronics that added over 5,000 lb (2,300 kg) of weight, 28 built. First flight: 13 February 1950.
F3D-1M
12 F3D-1s were converted into missile-armed test aircraft, used in the development of the AIM-7 Sparrow air-to-air missile.
F3D-2
Second Production version, initially powered by two 3,400 lbf (15 kN) Westinghouse J34-WE-36 and later by two 3,600 lbf (16 kN) Westinghouse J34-WE-38 turbojet engines, 490 kn (560 mph; 910 km/h) at 20,000 ft (6,100 m), equipped with wing spoilers, autopilot and an improved Westinghouse AN/APQ-36 radar, 237 built. First flight: 14 February 1951.
F3D-2B
One F3D-1 was used for special armament test in 1952.
F3D-2M
16 F3D-2s were converted into missile armed aircraft. The F3D-2Ms were armed with AIM-7 Sparrow air-to-air missiles.
F3D-2Q
35 F3D-2s were converted into electronic warfare aircraft.
F3D-2T
Five F3D-2s were converted into night fighter training aircraft.
F3D-2T2
55 F3D-2s were used as radar-operator trainers and electronic warfare aircraft.
F3D-3
Unbuilt project, intended to be an advanced version incorporating swept wings.

F-10A
1962 re-designation of the F3D-1.
F-10B
1962 re-designation of the F3D-2.
EF-10B
1962 re-designation of the F3D-2Q.
MF-10A
1962 re-designation of the F3D-1M.
MF-10B
1962 re-designation of the F3D-2M.
TF-10B
1962 re-designation of the F3D-2T2.

== Operators ==
United States

- United States Army
- United States Marine Corps
- United States Navy

== Aircraft on display ==
F3D-2

- BuNo 124598 – National Museum of Naval Aviation at NAS Pensacola, Florida.
- BuNo 124629 – Pima Air & Space Museum adjacent to Davis-Monthan AFB in Tucson, Arizona.
- BuNo 124630 – Flying Leatherneck Aviation Museum at MCAS Miramar, California.
- BuNo 125807 – Combat Air Museum in Topeka, Kansas.
- BuNo 125870, (repainted as BuNo 127039) – Korean War and Vietnam War memorial in Del Valle Park in Lakewood, California. Originally displayed in 1950s-era dark blue coloring, the aircraft was repainted in 1963 to the grey and white color scheme of Marine Corps aircraft at the time. With this repainting, the aircraft had the tail code "7L," which was the 1960s-era tail code for Marine Corps Air Reserve and Naval Air Reserve aircraft at nearby Naval Air Station Los Alamitos, California. In 2015, the aircraft was refurbished and painted in grey and white to depict a late 1950s-era Skyknight of VMFT(N)-20 with tail code "BP."

F3D-2Q

- BuNo 124618 – National Museum of the Marine Corps, in Quantico, Virginia.
- BuNo 124620 – Quonset Air Museum at Quonset State Airport (former NAS Quonset Point) in Quonset Point, Rhode Island.
- BuNo 125850 – Air Force Flight Test Center Museum at Edwards AFB, California. This aircraft served until 1970 as part of VMCJ-3 (U.S. Marine Composite Reconnaissance Squadron 3) based at Marine Corps Air Station El Toro, California, carrying tail code "TN."

F3D-2T

- BuNo 127074 – Empire State Aerosciences Museum (ESAM) near Schenectady, New York. This F3D was operated by Raytheon in Massachusetts for electronics tests until it was donated to the Intrepid Sea-Air-Space Museum in New York City, New York. It was displayed at the museum from 1987 until April 2012, when it was one of three aircraft moved to the ESAM to make room for the Space Shuttle Enterprise. It is painted in the livery of U.S. Marine Night Fighter Squadron 513 (VMF(N)-513) as flown during the Korean War.

== Specifications (F3D-2) ==
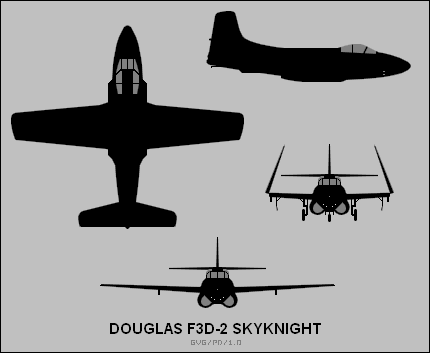
F3D-2 Skyknight drawings

Data from McDonnell Douglas aircraft since 1920 : Volume I, Standard Aircraft Characteristics : F3D-2 Skyknight

General characteristics

- Crew: 2
- Length: 45 ft 5 in (13.84 m)
- Wingspan: 50 ft 0 in (15.24 m) 26 ft 10 in (8.18 m) folded
- Height: 16 ft 1 in (4.90 m) wings spread, 16 ft 6 in (5.03 m) wings folded
- Wing area: 400 sq ft (37 m^{2})
- Aspect ratio: 6.23
- Mean Aerodynamic Chord (MAC): 99.8 in (2,530 mm)
- Airfoil: NACA 1412
- Empty weight: 14,989 lb (6,799 kg)
- Gross weight: 23,575 lb (10,693 kg)
- Max takeoff weight: 26,731 lb (12,125 kg)
- Maximum landing weight: 24,500 lb (11,100 kg)
- Fuel capacity: 1,350 US gal (1,120 imp gal; 5,100 L) maximum internal fuel and 2x 150 US gal (120 imp gal; 570 L) optional drop-tanks
- Powerplant: 2 × Westinghouse J34-WE-36 turbojet engines, 3,400 lbf (15 kN) thrust each

Performance

- Maximum speed: 460 kn (530 mph, 850 km/h) at 10,000 ft (3,000 m)
- Cruise speed: 395 kn (455 mph, 732 km/h)
- Stall speed: 80.6 kn (92.8 mph, 149.3 km/h) with approach power
- Combat range: 995 nmi (1,145 mi, 1,843 km) on internals
- Ferry range: 1,195 nmi (1,375 mi, 2,213 km) with 2 × 150 USgal drop-tanks
- Service ceiling: 36,700 ft (11,200 m)
- g limits: +5.5 at 19,700 lb (8,900 kg)
  - +5.1 at 21,374 lb (9,695 kg)
  - +4 at 26,731 lb (12,125 kg)
- Rate of climb: 3,570 ft/min (18.1 m/s)
- Wing loading: 58.9 lb/sq ft (288 kg/m^{2})
- Thrust/weight: 0.288

Armament

- Guns: 4 × 20 mm (0.787 in) Hispano-Suiza M2 cannon, 200 rpg
- Rockets: 2 × 11.75 in (298 mm) Tiny Tim unguided rockets
- Missiles: 4× Sparrow I air-to-air missiles (F3D-2M)
- Bombs: 2 × 2,000 lb (910 kg) bombs

Avionics

- AN/APQ-35A or -35B radar
- Westinghouse AN/APQ-36 radar

== See also ==
Related development

- Douglas F6D Missileer

Aircraft of comparable role, configuration, and era

- Avro Canada CF-100 Canuck
- Curtiss-Wright XF-87 Blackhawk
- de Havilland Sea Venom
- de Havilland Sea Vixen
- Gloster Javelin
- Lockheed F-94 Starfire
- Northrop F-89 Scorpion
- Yakovlev Yak-25

Related lists

- List of fighter aircraft
- List of military aircraft of the United States
- List of United States Navy aircraft designations (pre-1962)
