= AN/APQ-120 radar family =

Military aircraft fire-control radar family

AN/APQ-120
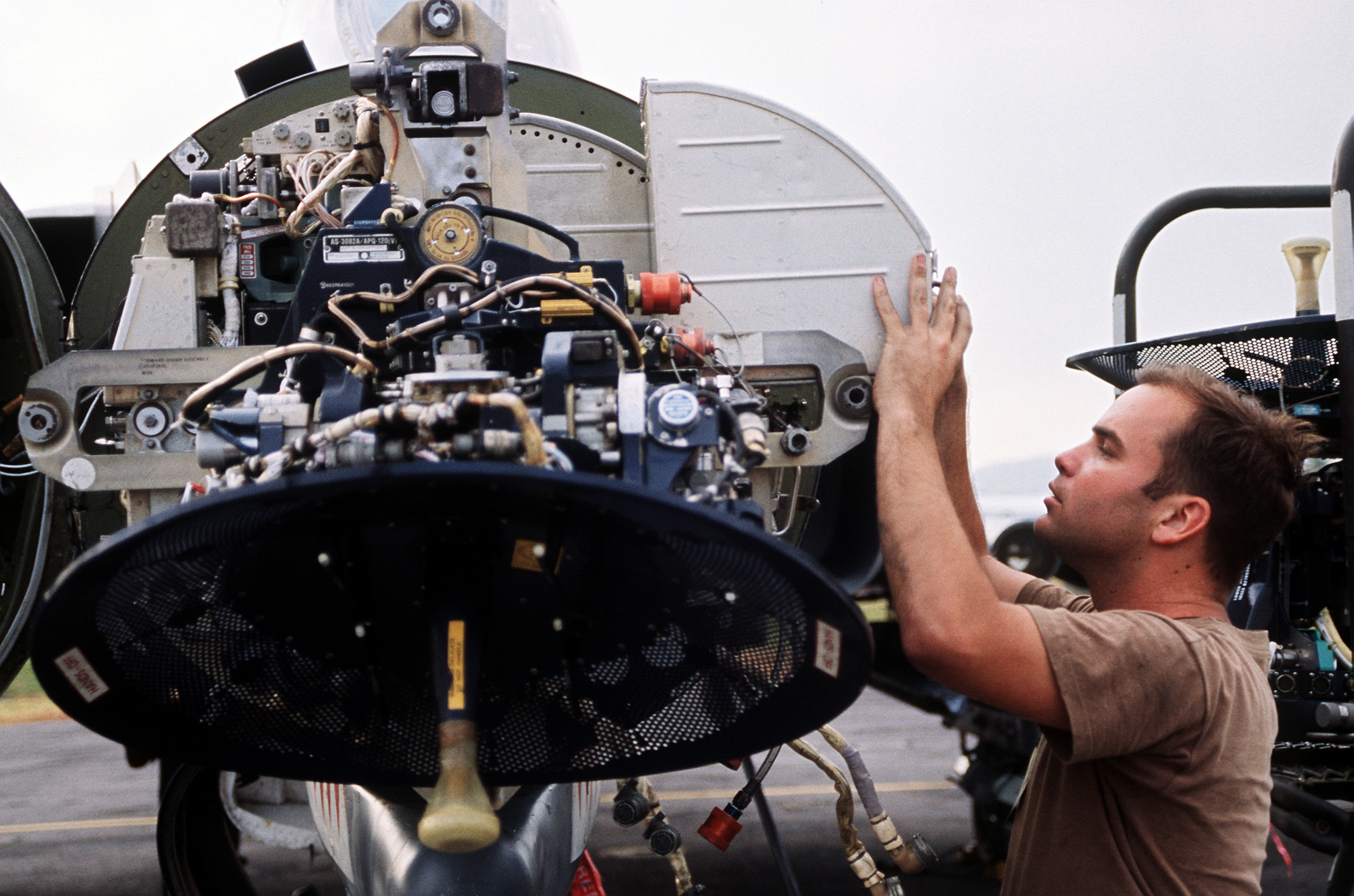
- F-4E Phantom II with AN/APQ-120 installed
- Country of origin: United States
- Type: Fire-control radar

The AN/APQ-120 was an aircraft fire-control radar (FCR) manufactured by Westinghouse for the McDonnell Douglas F-4E Phantom II. Its design lineage can be traced to the Aero-13 fire-control radar developed by the same company in the early 1950s. The first 18 F-4s tested and evaluated approximately half a dozen different FCRs, but these early systems were soon replaced by later radars produced in large numbers, including the AN/APQ-120.

== Aero-13 ==
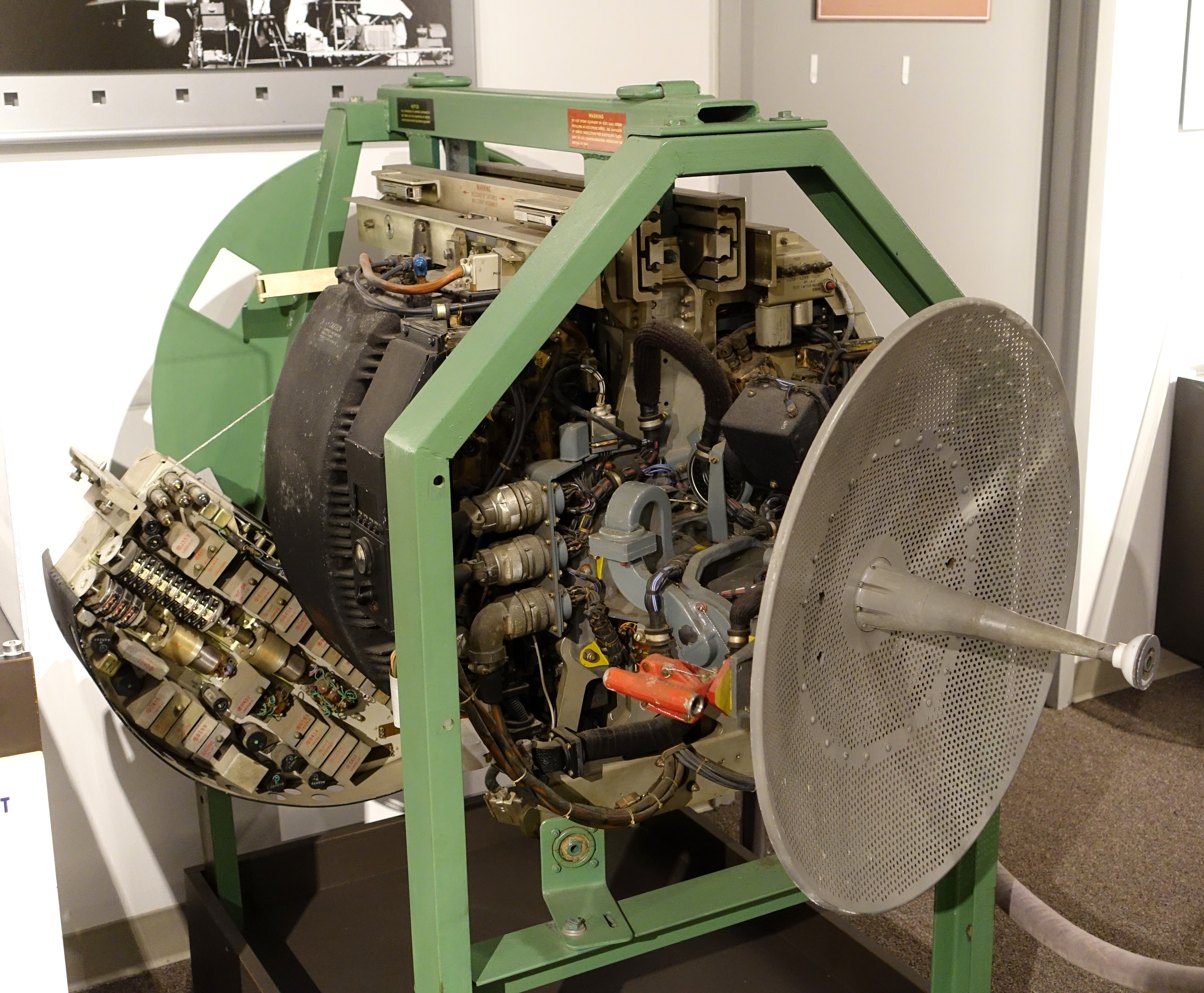
Aero-13 Fire Control System

Designed for the Douglas F4D Skyray, the Aero-13 fire-control radar formed the basis for the later AN/APQ-120 and established a configuration that influenced not only subsequent members of the AN/APQ-120 radar family but also the general design of airborne fire-control radars. The Aero-13 was designed as an integrated cylindrical module that could be installed as a single unit in an aircraft's nose, rather than as a collection of semi-independent electronic components.

== Aero-1A ==
The Aero-13 lacked the capability to support semi-active radar homing (SARH) air-to-air missile (AAMs). The Aero-1A radar was developed to add this capability by incorporating a continuous-wave illuminator for SARH-guided missiles. This configuration was retained in later radar systems developed for the F-4 series, remaining in use through the AN/APQ-50.

== AN/APQ-35 ==
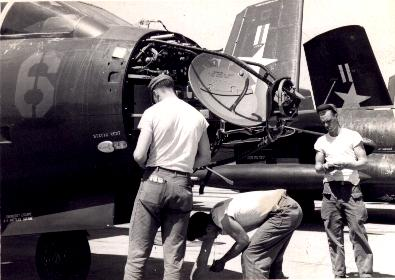
Maintenance on an APQ-35 radar of a F3D-2 in Korea, 1953

The next radar installed on F-4 prototypes and pre-production aircraft was AN/APQ-35, which consisted of two separate units. The AN/APS-21 search radar could detect fighter-size targets at ranges of up to 32 kilometers (20 miles), while the AN/APS-26 targeting radar had an effective range of approximately 3.2 kilometers (2 miles).

== AN/APQ-36 ==
The AN/APQ-36 represented an improvement over the AN/APQ-35. When it entered service on the Douglas F3D Skyknight and the Vought F7U Cutlass, it was the largest airborne fire-control radar of its time. Despite its size, the AN/APQ-36 could be accommodated on F-4 prototypes, demonstrating that even larger and more powerful FCRs could be developed for future aircraft.

== AN/APQ-41 ==
The AN/APQ-41 was an improvement over the AN/APQ-36 and was designed to provide air intercept and search, automatically track a selected target, and supply lead angle and range information. Facilities were also provided for air-to-surface search, for beacon interrogation and response display, and for response display when used in connection with identification friend or foe (IFF). Specifications:

- Search or Gun-Aim Range: 24 nm max, 200 yd min
- Ground Mapping Range: 100 nm
- Beacon Range: 200 nm
- Reliable Gun-Aim Prediction: 2,000 yd max
- Tracking Accuracy: 25 yd within the ranges of 200 and 2,000 yd
- Future Range Accuracy: 25 yd
- Azimuth (Search): 106.5 deg
- Elevation (Search): 13 deg (within 30 deg of aircraft center line)
- Azimuth (Track): 116.5 deg
- Elevation (Track): 116.5 deg
- Accuracy (Search and Track): 4% all indications
- Type of Presentation:
  - B-scope (Search)-Target azimuth and range, range strobe, range markers, beacon, and IFF responses
  - C-scope (Search)-Target strobe, targets, straddled by range strobe, artificial horizon line, scan pattern
  - C-scope (Track)-Target dot, range rate circle and dot, artificial horizon line
- Fixed Range Marker: 25-mi markers on 100 and 200-mi scales
- Radar Frequency (Search and Track): 9375 30 mc
- Beacon Frequency: Transmitting, 9375 30 mc; receiving, 9310 1 mc
- Operating Temperature: -55 to +55 deg C
- Altitude Limit: 52,000 ft

== AN/APQ-46 ==
AN/APQ-46 is the last radar tested and evaluated on F-4 prototypes and pre-production series. F-4s equipped with this radar were specifically modified to meet the US Navy's Ferret electronic countermeasure aircraft requirement, which ultimately did not materialize.

== AN/APQ-50 ==
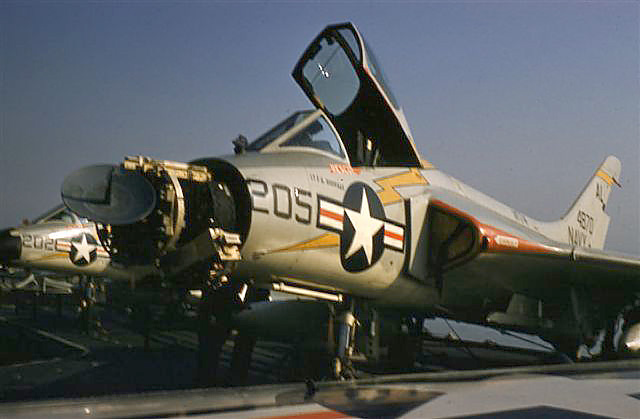
APQ-50 radar of a Douglas F4D Skyray

AN/APQ-50 is the radar installed on the low-rate initial production batch of F-4s, but, as with earlier radars, it was not used in large numbers compared to later radars of the same family. The parabolic antenna is 24 inches in diameter, and in addition to providing all-weather capability, the AN/APQ-50 FCR also provides information for automatic rocket firing.

== AN/APQ-72 ==
AN/APQ-72 FCR is a development of AN/APQ-50, with the diameter of the antenna increased by a third to 32 inches from the original 24 inches of AN/APQ-50. AN/APA-128 CW illuminator is integrated with the radar to give it a capability for radar-guided AAMs. AN/APQ-72 is the first radar installed on F-4s to be built in great numbers, starting with the 19th F-4 produced.

== AN/APG-59 ==
AN/APG-59 FCR is a modified AN/APQ-72 designed for the British. The main difference between AN/APG-59 and its predecessor is that the radar dish could be swung sideways to reduce the length of the aircraft to 54 feet so that it could fit on the small deck lifts of British carriers. Used in the AN/AWG-10.

== AN/APQ-100 ==
AN/APQ-100 is the replacement for the AN/APQ-72, and it features a redesigned radar scope in the rear cockpit that offers a plan position indicator (PPI) mapping display option and an adjustable range strobe for bombing. For air-to-ground missions, the radar interfaced with the inertial platform on F-4s.

== AN/APG-60 ==
A modified AN/APQ-100, AN/APG-60 was designed for the British to replace the AN/APG-59. As with AN/APG-59, AN/APG-60 also had a radar dish that could be swung sideways to reduce the length of the aircraft to 54 feet so that it could fit on the small deck lifts of British carriers. AN/APG-60 was later upgraded with Doppler capability during its upgrades, and integrated in the AN/AWG-11.

== AN/APQ-109 ==
AN/APQ-109 is an improvement over the earlier AN/APQ-100, with a cockpit display capable of handling TV imagery from weapons such as the AGM-62 Walleye. Other significant additions included air-to-ground ranging, ground beacon identification, and display capabilities. AN/APQ-109 was an improved, more reliable "hybrid" version of the AN/APQ-100 with solid-state components in the low-voltage sections.

== AN/APG-61 ==
AN/APG-61 is a modified AN/APQ-109 for the British, designed to replace AN/APG-60. As with AN/APG-59/60, AN/APG-61 also had a radar dish that could be swung sideways to reduce the length of the aircraft to 54 feet so that it could fit on the small deck lifts of British carriers. Used in the AN/AWG-12.

== AN/APQ-117 ==
AN/APQ-117 was a terrain following and attack radar, developed from earlier AN/APQ-109, with terrain following capability added.

== AN/APQ-120 ==
The AN/APQ-120 was a fully solid-state radar derived from the AN/APQ-117, which was much more compact than its predecessors, allowing it to fit in the nose alongside the cannon, and it was later integrated into the AN/AWG-14.

== AN/AWG-10 ==
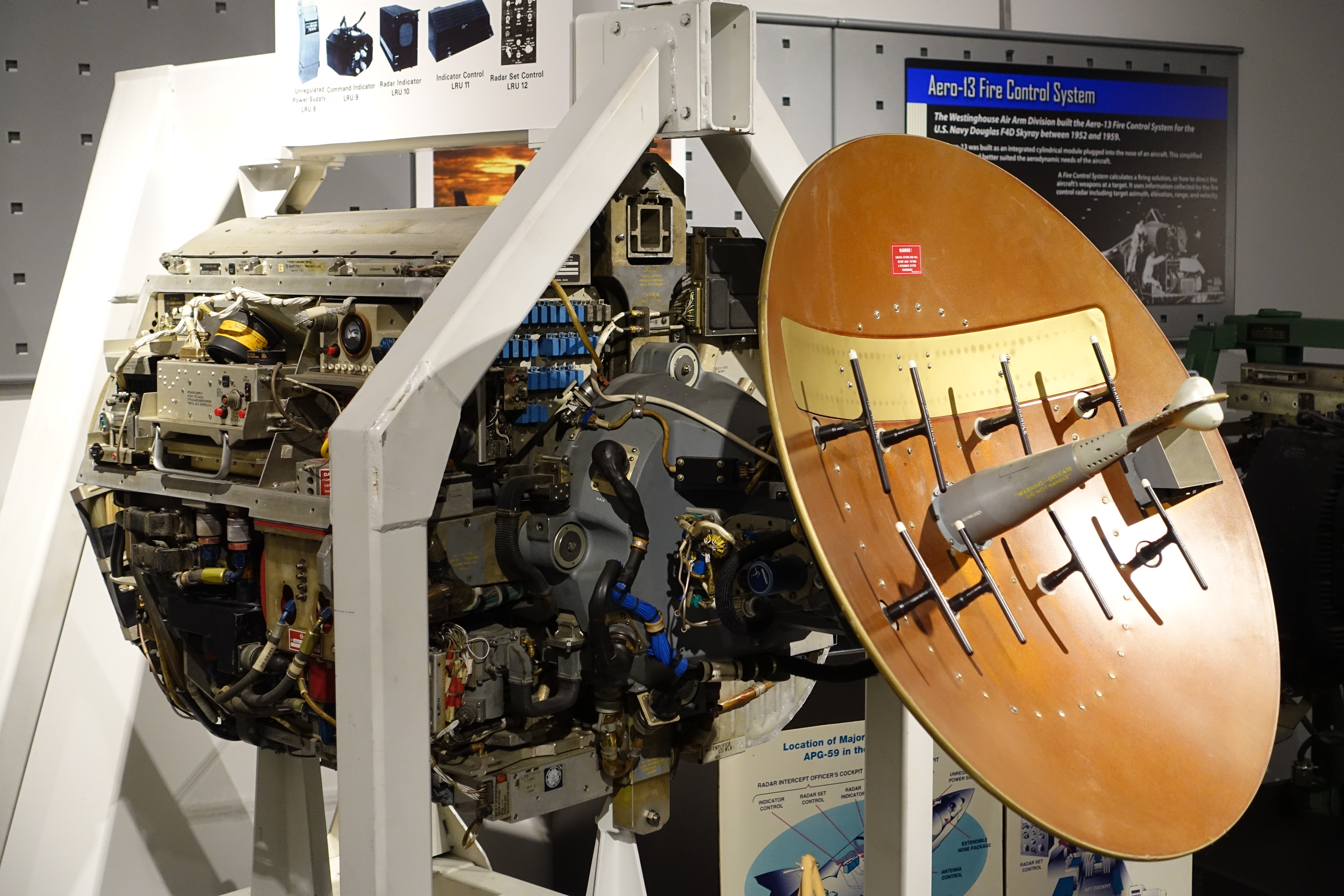
AN/AWG-10 with AN/APG-59

AN/AWG stands for (A) Piloted Aircraft (W) Armament (G) Fire Control. AN/APG-59 was the first FCR integrated into AN/AWG-10, which developed into two more versions, A and B. The original AN/AWG-10 can detect an aerial target with a 5-square-meter radar cross-section from more than 100 kilometers away.

AN/AWG-10A is a development of the original AN/AWG-10, with significant improvements in reliability and maintainability, achieved by replacing the original transmitter with a solid-state unit whose only tube was a klystron power amplifier. Adding a digital computer enabled much more effective missile-launch equations. AN/AWG-10A also incorporated a new servoed optical sight. There were also additions of new modes, such as continuously displayed impact point mode, freeze displayed impact mode, and computer-released visual mode. AN/AWG-10B was a further digitized version of AN/AWG-10/10A, but retained many analog circuits. A key AVC (avionics change) was the replacement of the unreliable Doppler Spectrum Analyzer (DSA) with a reliable Digital Spectrum Processor (DSP), which also improved accuracy in Doppler mode.

== AN/AWG-11 ==
AN/AWG-11 was a British AN/AWG-10 license-built by Ferranti. The radar used was AN/APG-60, and AN/AWG-11 is a slightly modified AN/AWG-10 in that it is compatible with AGM-12 Bullpup and WE.177, so that British F-4s can perform nuclear strike missions if required.

== AN/AWG-12 ==
AN/AWG-12 was an improved AN/AWG-11 built by Ferranti with AN/APG-61 FCR. The main difference between AN/AWG-11 and AN/AWG-12 is that the latter has a better ground mapping mode, and it also can control a belly-mounted SUU-23/A Vulcan. AN/AWG-12 finally retired in 1992 when the last F-4s in British service retired, and during its service life, it was upgraded with improvements of the AN/AWG-10A/B.

== AN/AWG-14 ==
AN/AWG-14 is the final member of the lineage of this radar family, and it is a fully digitized upgrade of the AWG series incorporating AN/APQ-120. The open architecture and modular design enable AWG-14 to accommodate different radars, such as AN/APG-65, AN/APG-66, AN/APG-76, Elta EL/M-2011/2021 and EL/M-2032.

== See also ==
- List of radars
- List of military electronics of the United States
- Joint Electronics Type Designation System
