= VMF-113 =

Marine Fighter Squadron 113
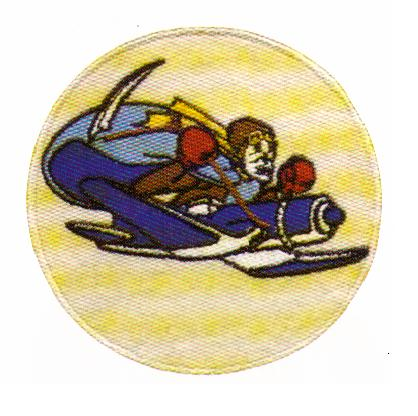
- VMF-113 Insignia
- Active: 1 January 1943 – 30 April 1947; N/A – 22 October 1965
- Country: United States
- Branch: USMC
- Type: Fighter squadron
- Role: Air interdiction
- Part of: Inactive
- Nickname: Whistling Devils
- Tail Code: NK
- Engagements: World War II * Battle of Okinawa

Marine Fighter Squadron 113 (VMF-113) was a fighter squadron of the United States Marine Corps during World War II and in the Marine Forces Reserve until 1965. Known as the "Whistling Devils", the squadron participated in aerial combat over the Marshall Islands in 1944 and took part in the Battle of Okinawa in 1945. It was decommissioned on 30 April 1947 following the end of World War II but was reactivated in the Reserves a few years later only to be deactivated for the last time in 1965.

== History ==
=== World War II ===
VMF-113 was commissioned on 1 January 1943 at Marine Corps Air Station El Toro as part of Marine Base Defense Air Group 41. They were shortly given their full complement of twenty four F4U Corsairs. After training for most of 1943, the squadron set sail from San Diego on 28 September 1943 headed for Hawaii. Upon their arrival the aircraft were sent to Marine Corps Air Station Ewa for their final round of training.

In January 1944, the squadron learned they would be participating in the reduction of the remaining Japanese garrisons in the Marshall Islands. They soon set sail for Tarawa in the Gilbert Islands and then quickly moved to Kwajalein and finally began operating from Engebi on 27 February 1944 as part of the 4th Base Defense Air Wing. While there they were also responsible for attacking Japanese positions in the western Caroline Islands.

On 26 March 1944, while escorting 4 B-25 bombers on a raid over Ponape, the squadron recorded their first enemy kills when they down 8 Japanese aircraft. In April of that year they were tasked with providing air support for the landings at Ujeland. Since the assault was unopposed the squadron quickly returned to striking Japanese targets in the Marshall Islands for the remainder of 1944.

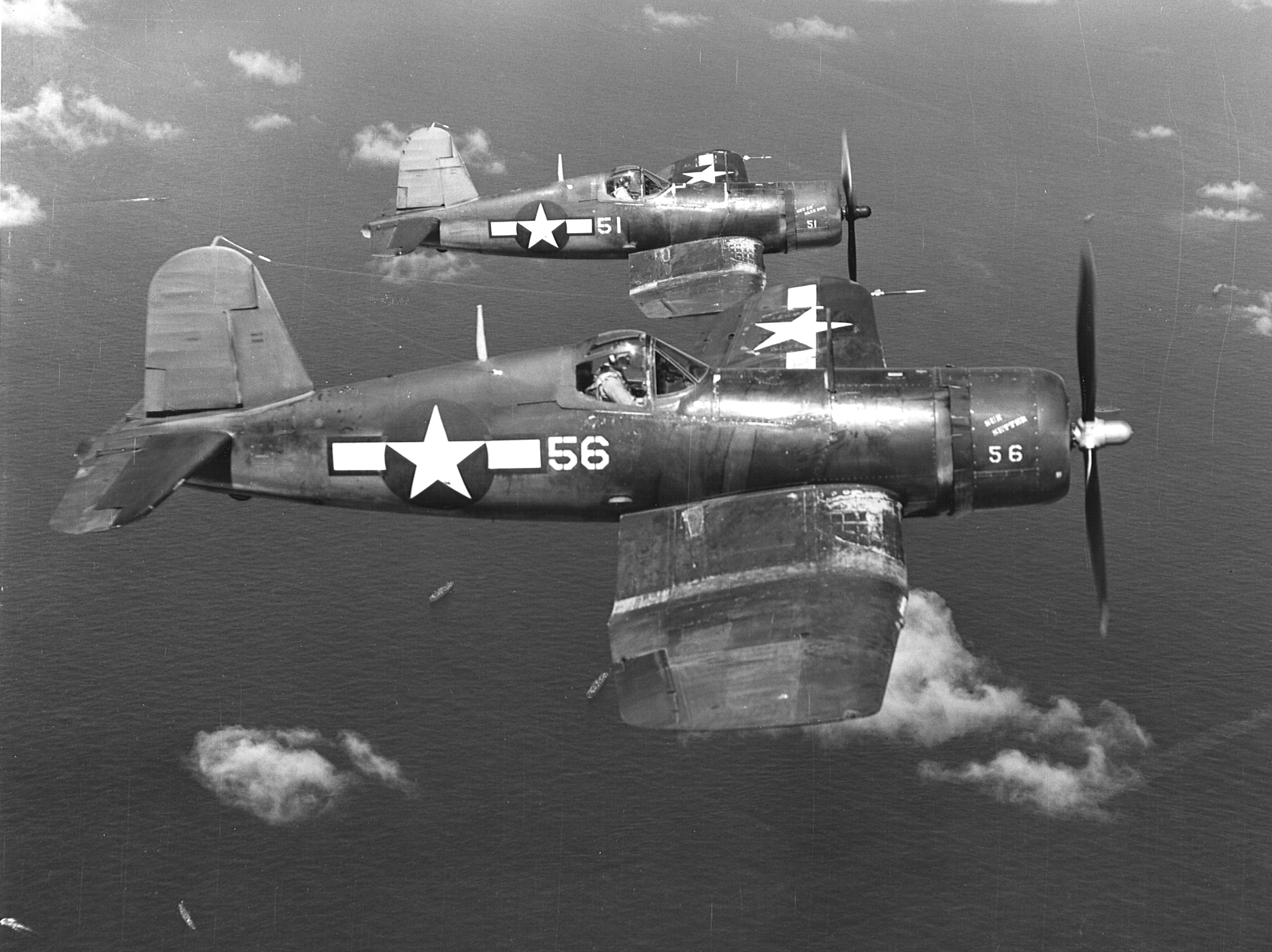
Two F4U-1A Corsairs of VMF-113 over Eniwetok Atoll, in July 1944.

On 6 May 1945, VMF-113 landed on Ie Shima as part of Marine Aircraft Group 22 (MAG-22) to support operations during the Battle of Okinawa. The next day the squadron saw its first action since early 1944 when a mass kamikaze raid came after the US fleet assembled for the invasion of the island. The squadron moved to Okinawa in July 1945 and remained there for the remainder of the war. The squadron accounted for 20 enemy aircraft shot down during the course of World War II.

After the war, the squadron was moved to Omura on the southern Japanese Island of Kyūshū on 20 September 1945 and remained there until late November when they sailed for the United States. They arrived in San Diego on 5 December and were soon based out of MCAS El Toro. The squadron was deactivated on 30 April 1947.

=== Reserve years ===
VMF-113 was reactivated in 1951 and at Naval Air Station Olathe, Kansas along with VMF-215. In 1958 they transitioned to the F9F Cougar and in 1962 to the F4D Skyray. During this time, due to an aircraft shortage in the reserves, the squadron used the same aircraft as VMF-215 and two other U.S. Navy reserve squadrons. In 1964, the squadron was re-designated VMF(AW)-113 after its aircraft were upgraded however this did not last long as they quickly transitioned to the daytime only F8 Crusader in April 1965 and again became VMF-113. The squadron was deactivated on 22 October 1965 and is still in an inactive status.

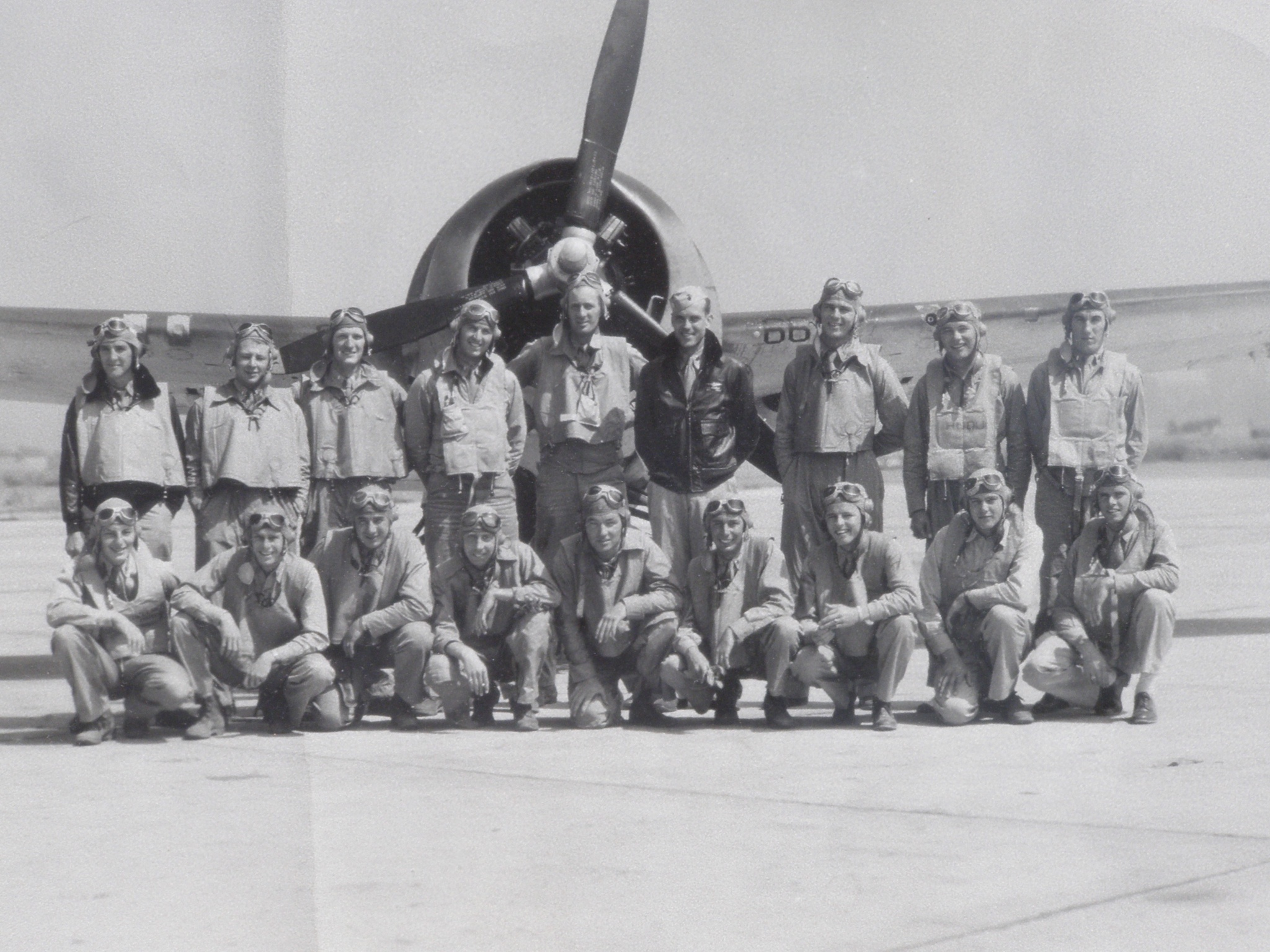
VMF-113 Pilots

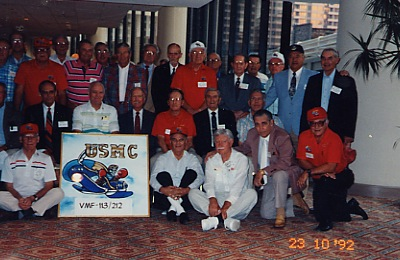
VMF-113 Squadron Reunion 1992

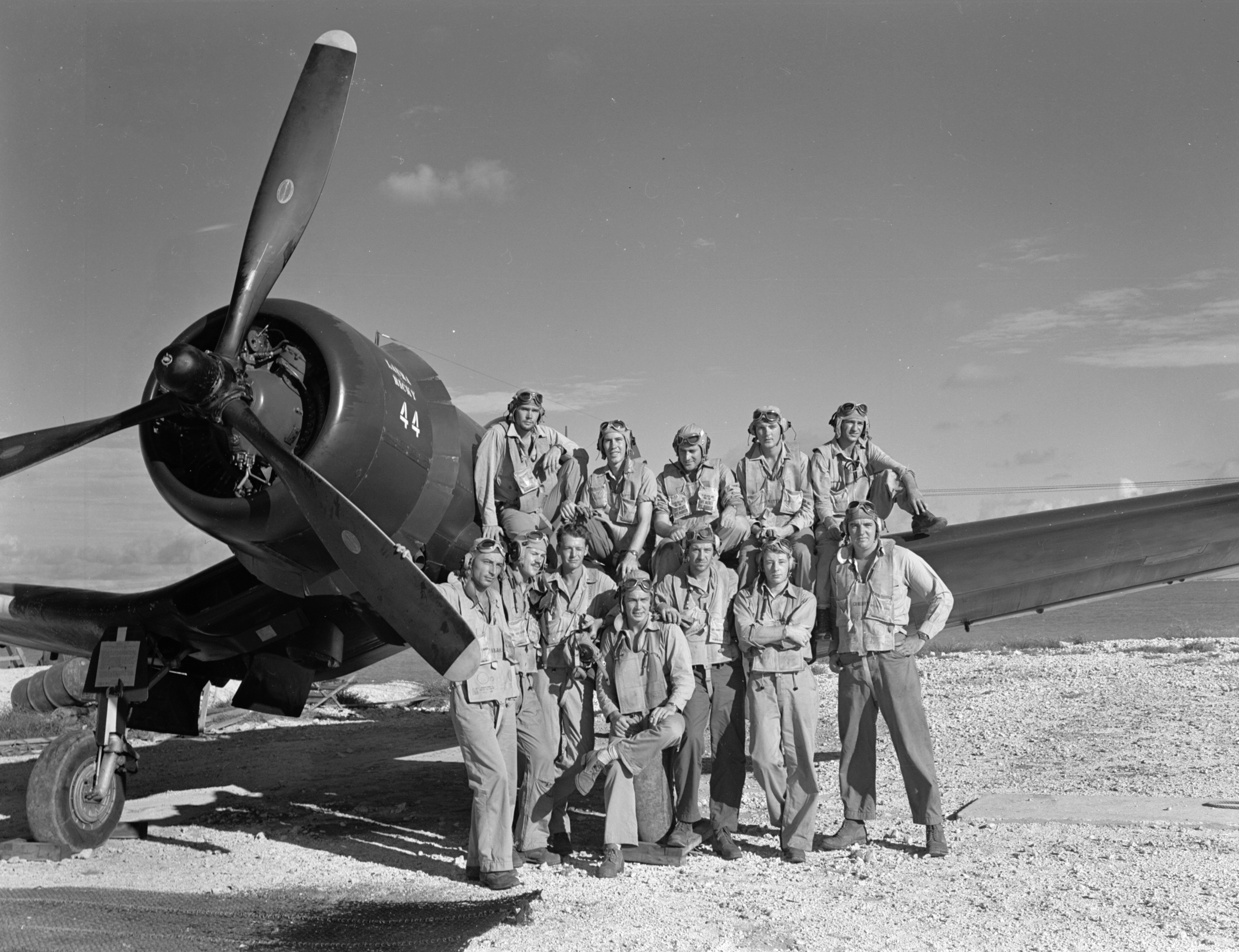
VMF-113 pilots

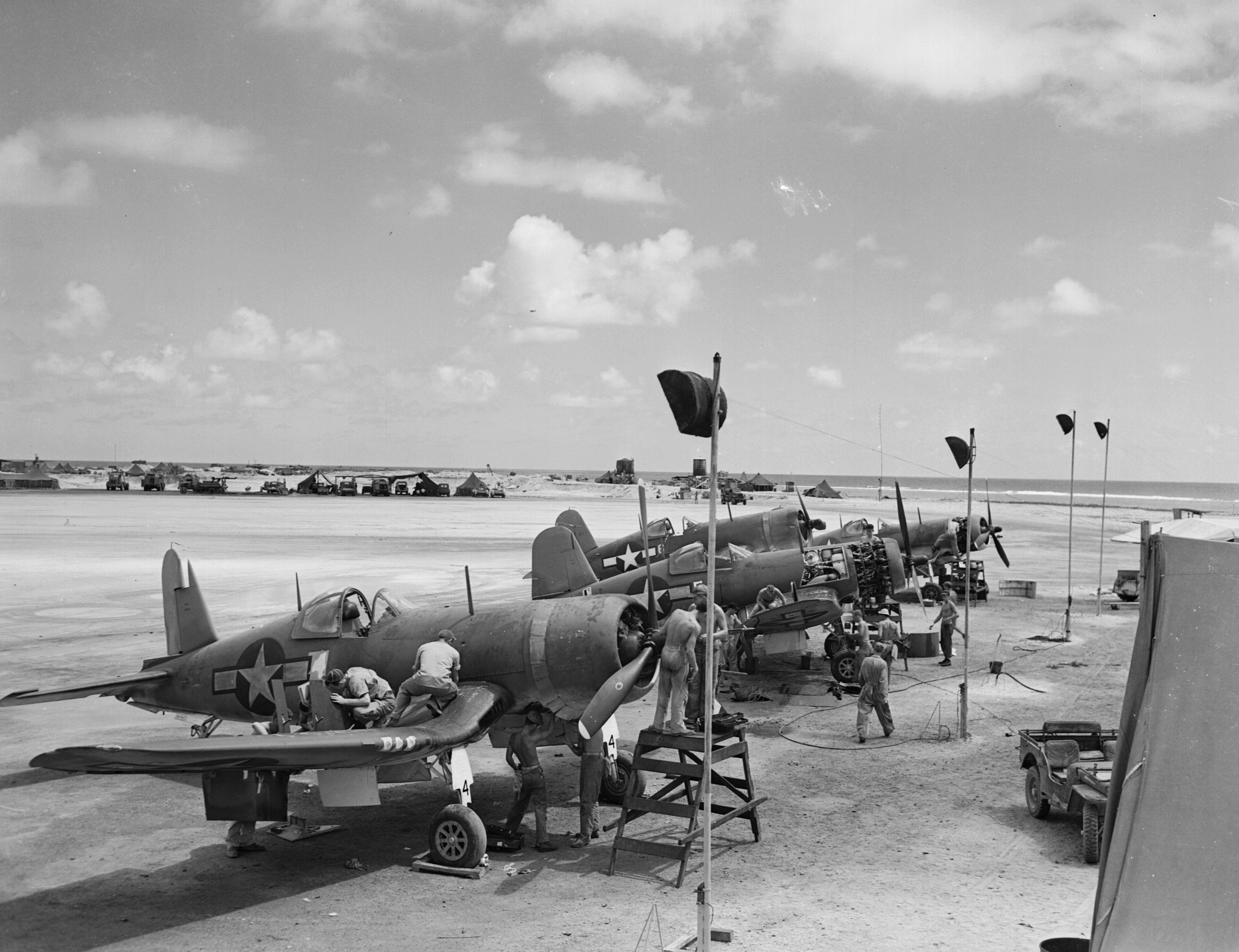
VMF-113 Airfield Enjebi Island

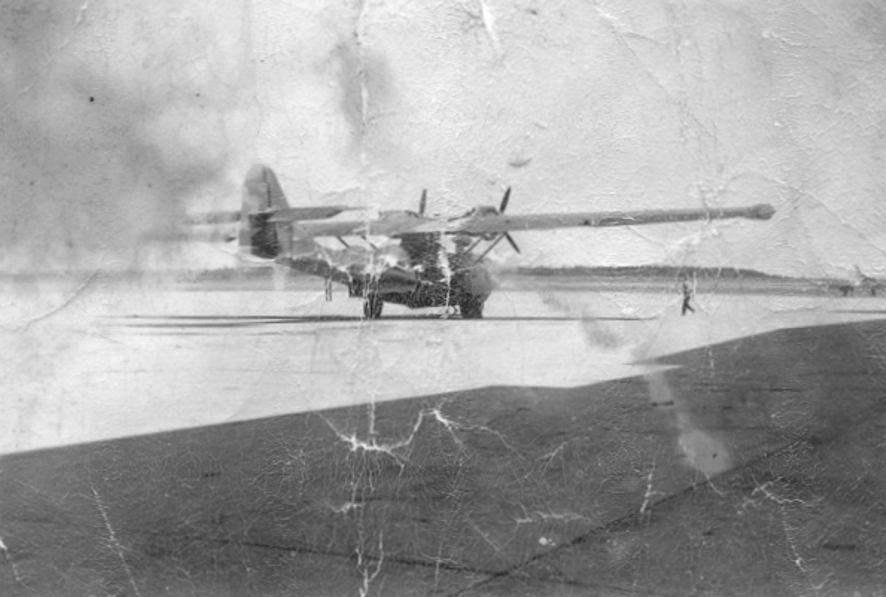
Rescue plane that picked up John E. Zoellner after putting down his Corsair after engine failure.

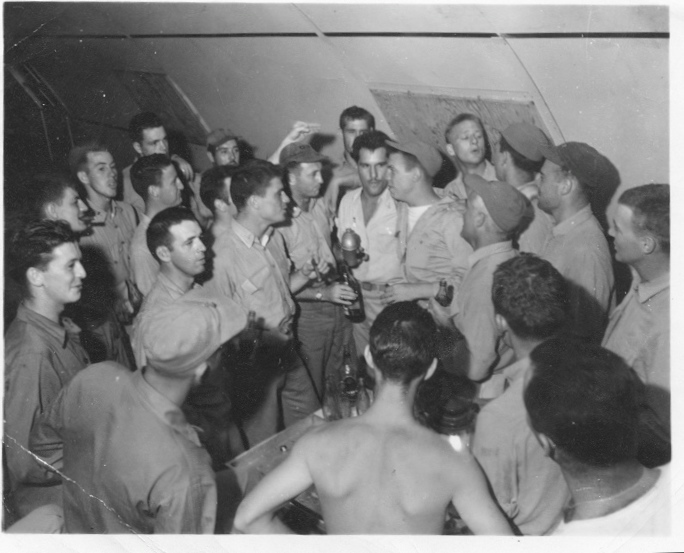
VMF-113 Pilots in Officer's Quarters.

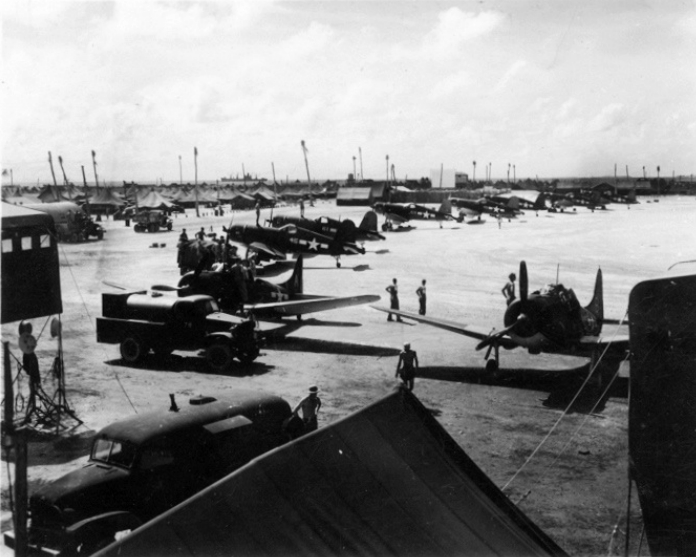
VMF-113 aircraft on Engebi Island, circa 1944

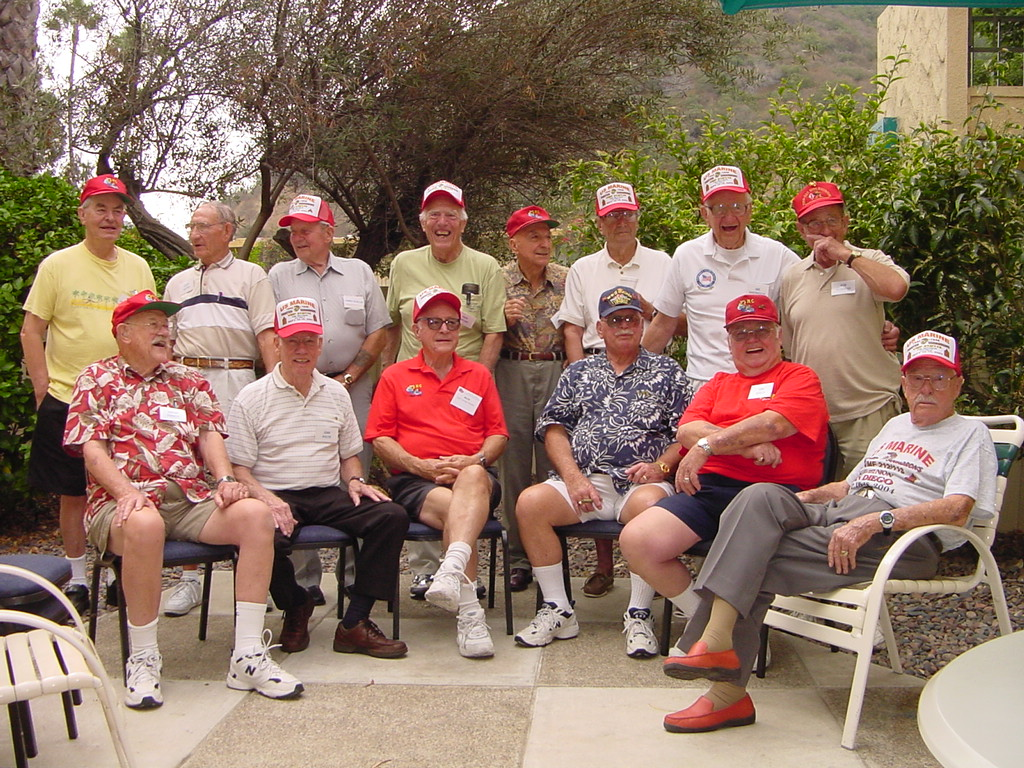
VMF-113 2004 Squadron Reunion

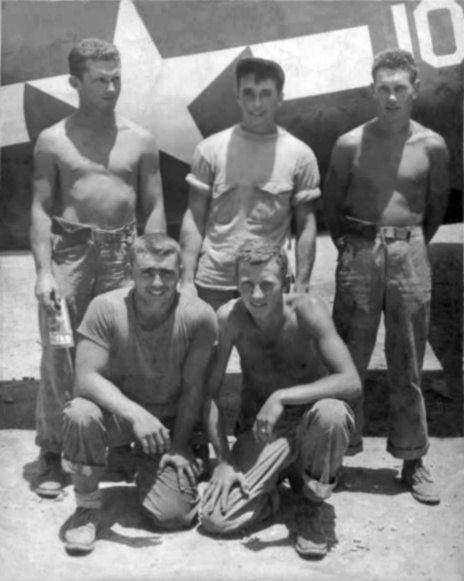
Marines on Guam 1944 (VMF-113)

== Unit awards ==
A unit citation or commendation is an award bestowed upon an organization for the action cited. Members of the unit who participated in said actions are allowed to wear on their uniforms the awarded unit citation. VMF-113 has been presented with the following awards:

Streamer	Award	Year(s)	Additional Info
A streamer with red, gold, and blue horizontal stripes with a bronze star in the center	Presidential Unit Citation Streamer	1945	Okinawa
	Asiatic-Pacific Campaign Streamer		Okinawa
	World War II Victory Streamer	1941–1945	Pacific War
	Navy Occupation Service Streamer with "ASIA"		
	National Defense Service Streamer with one Bronze Stars	1951–1954, 1961–1974	Korean War, Vietnam War

== See also ==
- United States Marine Corps Aviation
- List of active United States Marine Corps aircraft squadrons
- List of decommissioned United States Marine Corps aircraft squadrons
