= Douglas F4D Skyray =

US carrier-based jet-powered interceptor

F4D (F-6) Skyray
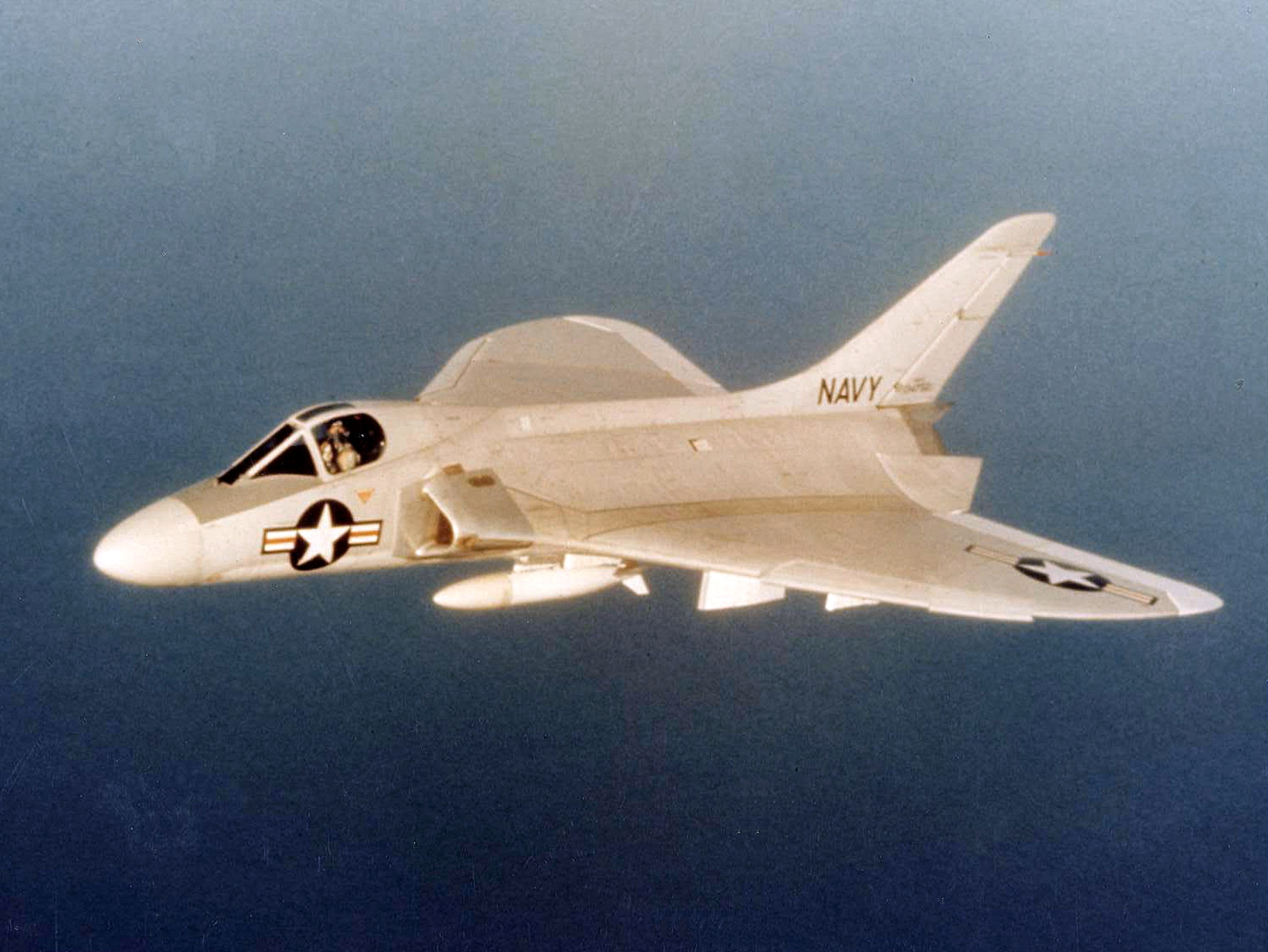

General information
- Type: Fighter aircraft
- Manufacturer: Douglas Aircraft Company
- Status: Retired
- Primary users: United States Navy United States Marine Corps
- Number built: 422

History
- Manufactured: 1950–1958
- Introduction date: April 1956
- First flight: 23 January 1951
- Retired: February 1964
- Developed into: Douglas F5D Skylancer

The Douglas F4D Skyray (later redesignated F-6 Skyray) is an American carrier-based supersonic fighter/interceptor designed and produced by the Douglas Aircraft Company. It was the last fighter produced by the Douglas Aircraft Company before the company merged with McDonnell Aircraft to become McDonnell Douglas.

In the late 1940s, Douglas and the U.S. Navy launched the D-571-1 design study, which called for delta wing interceptor that could climb quickly enough to intercept approaching bombers. Chosen by the Navy to fulfill a formal requirement issued in 1948, the plane was initially designed around the Westinghouse J40 turbojet engine, but required a redesign for the Pratt & Whitney J57 after the J40 was cancelled. Aerodynamic problems prolonged development; considerable design changes were made after the maiden flight of the first production-standard Skyray in June 1954. The Skyray was declared ready for fleet introduction in April 1956 and entered service with both the United States Navy (USN) and United States Marine Corps (USMC) shortly thereafter.

The Skyray had a relatively brief service life and never saw combat. It was the first carrier-launched aircraft to hold the world's absolute speed record: 752.943 mph, (1,211.487 km/h). It is widely reported as the first naval fighter to break the speed of sound in level flight rather than in a dive. The Skyray also set a new time-to-altitude record, flying from a standing start to 49,221 feet (15,003 m) in two minutes and 36 seconds at a 70° pitch angle. The last Skyrays were withdrawn from service in February 1964, although a handful were flown for experimental purposes by National Advisory Committee for Aeronautics (NACA) up to the end of the decade. The F5D Skylancer was an advanced development of the F4D Skyray that did not enter service.

== Design and development ==
The Skyray originated within a design study, the D-571-1, performed by Douglas and funded by the United States Navy (USN). It was a fast-climbing pure interceptor aircraft with a delta wing, powered by a pair of Westinghouse J34 turbojet engines, which were equipped with afterburners for bursts of additional acceleration. The D-571-1 had a relatively thick wing with no conventional fuselage save for a pod-like cockpit in a forward position. A total of four 20mm cannons extended forward of the leading edge of the wing; alternative armaments consisted of spin-stabilized rockets. The design study had harnessed the designs and research of the German aerodynamicist Alexander Lippisch, who moved to the United States following the end of World War II, and whose work had been examined by several of Douglas's design team. In June 1947, the Navy issued a contract to Douglas to proceed with preliminary investigation and engineering works on the concept up to the mockup stage.

As the design was refined, the wing's thickness was substantially reduced to increase its high speed capabilities. The twin J34 engine arrangement was also swapped out for a single Westinghouse J40 engine. Only a single hydraulic system was incorporated and measures to permit manual reversion in the event of hydraulic failure were included. Rockets would be the primary armament, housed in pylon-mounted pods underneath the wing. A formal operational requirement was issued by the Navy in 1948; however, according to aviation author Tommy H. Thomason, it was a foregone conclusion from the outset that Douglas would win the contract. Specifics of this requirement included the ability to intercept and destroy an enemy aircraft at an altitude of 50,000 ft (15,240 m) within five minutes of the alarm being sounded. At the time, Navy planners were particularly concerned by the threat posed to its carrier battle groups by high altitude Soviet bomber aircraft; as early jet aircraft were fuel-hungry and had limited endurance, it was necessary for an interceptor to climb very quickly to its operational altitude to attain the time on station the Navy desired.

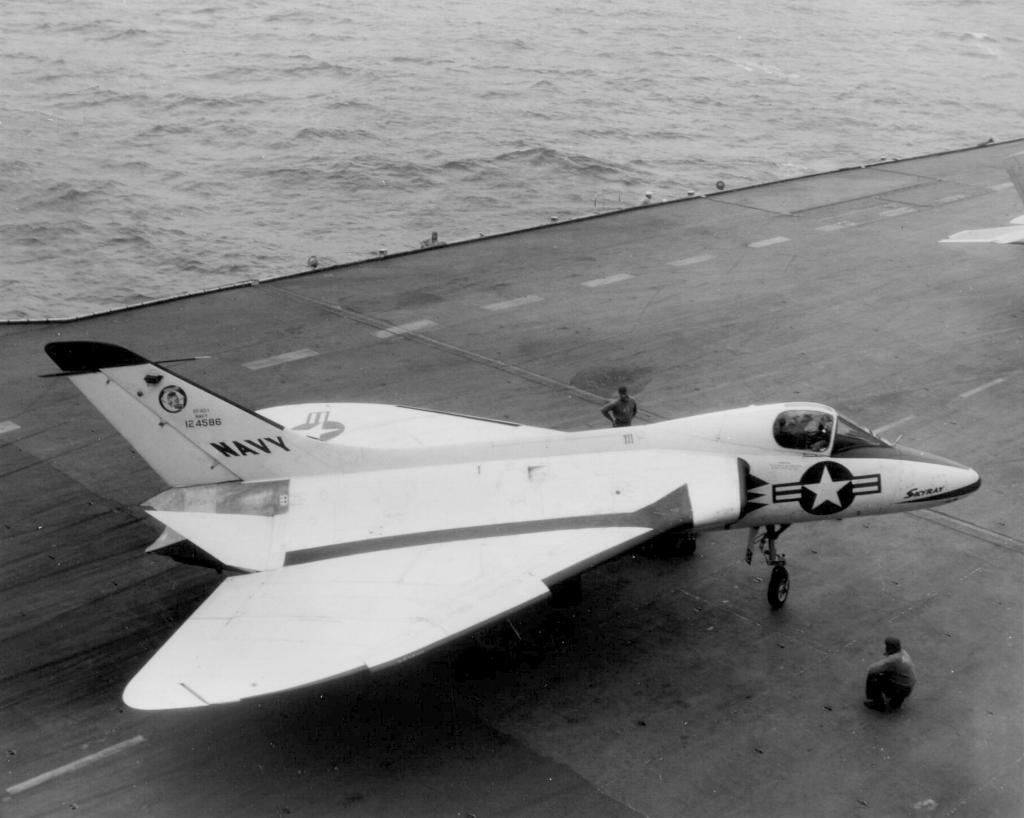
The XF4D-1 prototype aboard Coral Sea, in October 1953.

On account of the numerous design changes, the mockup review was delayed by almost one year, taking place in March 1949. One criticism produced at this stage was that the nose-up attitude was greater than had been anticipated, necessitating changes to the aircraft's nose and radome to improve the pilot's external visibility. A more pressing issue would be the J40 engine. Douglas' design team made accommodations for other engines as a contingency measure; this approach proved to be quite fortunate as the J40 had a particularly troubled development and was eventually cancelled with no production units delivered. As a temporary measure, the prototype had to be outfitted with an Allison J35 engine instead.

The long-term replacement for the J40 on production aircraft was the Pratt & Whitney J57, a more powerful but considerably larger engine. The ensuing delays to the program led to several other aircraft, such as the North American F-100 Super Sabre and the Mikoyan-Gurevich MiG-19, beating it into operational service.

On 5 June 1954, during its maiden flight, the first production F4D-1, bureau number (BuNo) 130740, reportedly became the first naval fighter to exceed the speed of sound in level flight. According to Flight, this was achieved during the aircraft's acceptance flight between the Douglas plant in El Segundo, California, and Edwards Air Force Base, flown by test pilot Bob Rahn. An intense period of flight testing and remedial design work followed, as there had been inadequate time to evaluate the J57 during the prototype stage. To address an engine stalling problem at near-supersonic speeds above 40,000 ft (12,000 m) of altitude, the air intake geometry had to be changed, and an airflow baffle plate added in front of each intake. The aft section of the fuselage was reprofiled to eliminate undesirable buffeting and reduce drag. In September 1955, initial carrier suitability trials were performed onboard USS Ticonderoga. No production aircraft were delivered until early 1956 when the F4D was declared ready for fleet introduction in April. A total of 419 F4D-1 (later designated F-6 under the unified designation system) aircraft would be produced prior to the end of production in 1958.

The Skyray was a wide delta wing design with long, sharply swept, rounded wings. It was named for its resemblance to the manta ray. The thick wing roots contained the air intakes that fed its single turbojet engine. Fuel was contained both in the wings and the deep fuselage. Leading edge slats were fitted for increased lift during takeoff and landing while the trailing edges comprised mostly elevon control surfaces. Additional pitch trimmers were fitted inboard near the jet exhaust, and were locked upwards on takeoff and landing. It had a relatively unique design for the era, which was a key factor in the Skyray becoming one of the best-known early jet fighters. It was affectionately known as the "Ford" (after the "Four" and "D" of its designation). During 1953, Edward H. Heinemann was awarded the Collier Trophy in recognition of his design work on the F4D.

=== Supersonic capability ===
Thomason disputes the commonly accepted claims that the Skyray achieved supersonic speed in level flight and was the first naval aircraft to do so. He notes that the formal Navy report from the F4D-1 acceptance trials explicitly states that the aircraft "does not have level flight supersonic capability", and that Heinemann and Rahn never mention this capability in their memoirs, with Rahn mentioning only that the Skyray was supersonic in a dive. Thomason further notes that the Skyray's speed-record flight was conducted when the ambient temperature was unusually high at 37 °C (99 °F), delaying the onset of transonic drag; although the speed of sound is 761 mph (1,225 km/h) at standard temperature and pressure, it rises to 790 mph (1,270 km/h) at 37 °C, so the Skyray's speed during the record-setting flight was equal to only 0.95 Mach. Thomason writes that, according to U.S. Navy records, the first naval aircraft to exceed the speed of sound in level flight was a Grumman F11F Tiger prototype.

== Operational history ==
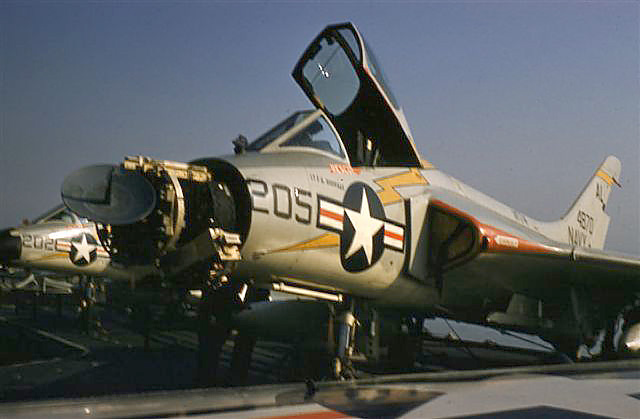
APQ-50A radar of an F4D-1

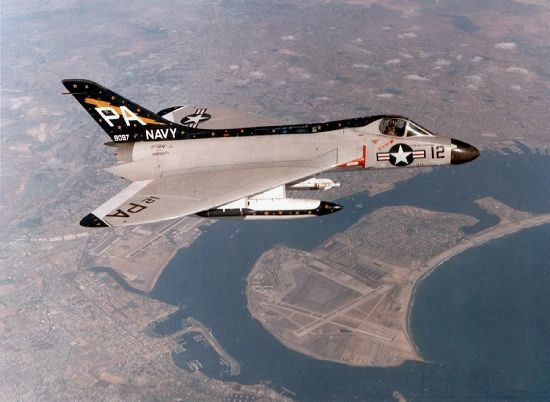
F4D-1 of VF(AW)-3 in flight over San Diego.

During April 1956, VC-3 became the first squadron to attain operational status with the F4D-1. This unit was later redesignated VFAW-3 and assigned to NORAD, becoming the only United States Navy fighter squadron in what was predominantly a United States Air Force (USAF) and Royal Canadian Air Force (RCAF) organization. VFAW-3 was permanently based at NAS North Island in San Diego.

The United States Marine Corps (USMC) also operated the Skyray. When the Department of Defense adopted a uniform aircraft designation system patterned on the USAF's aircraft designation system during September 1962, the F4D was redesignated as the F-6A Skyray. The F4D (old designation) should not be confused with the F-4D (new designation) – the latter being the "D" variant of the McDonnell Douglas F-4 Phantom II operated by the USAF.

The Skyray was designed exclusively for the high-altitude interception role, with a high rate and angle of climb. It set a new time-to-altitude record, flying from a standing start to 49,221 feet (15,003 m) in two minutes and 36 seconds, all while flying at a 70° pitch angle. As a dedicated interceptor, the F4D was unsuited to the multi-mission capabilities that became increasingly in demand, thus the type had a relatively short career in both USN and USMC service. In addition to multiple Navy and Marine Corps squadrons, Naval Air Reserve and Marine Air Reserve squadrons VF-881, VF-882 and VMF-215 also flew the Skyray. The last operational squadron was VMF(AW)-115, which flew the Skyray until February 1964. A total of four aircraft were used for experimental purposes by the National Advisory Committee for Aeronautics (NACA) (which was later renamed NASA) until 1969.

=== F5D Skylancer ===
The F5D Skylancer was derived from the F4D and intended to be a Mach 2 capable successor to the Skyray. Although four prototypes were built and flown, the project was cancelled as being too similar in mission parameters to the F8U Crusader and also to reduce dependence upon Douglas Aircraft, which was also producing several other aircraft for the U.S. Navy. This decision effectively removed Douglas from active fighter development.

== Variants ==
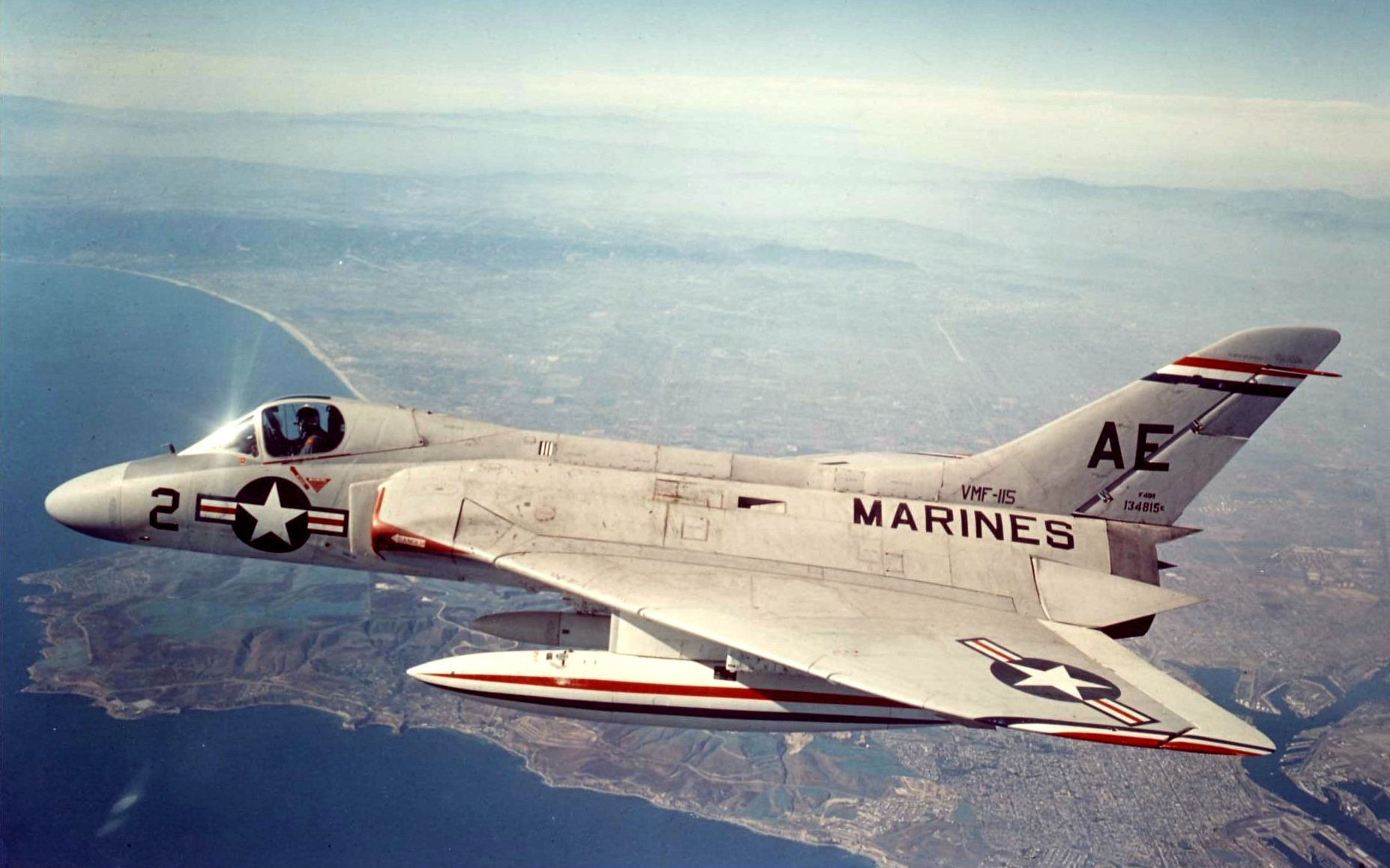
F4D-1 Skyray

XF4D-1
Prototypes; redesignated YF-6A in 1962, two built.

F4D-1
Single-seat fighter aircraft, production model; redesignated F-6A in 1962, 420 built.

F4D-2
Re-engined F4D-1 with the J57-F-14, 100 on order cancelled.

F4D-2N
F4D-2 version with extended nose housing twin radar scanners, project only evolved into the F5D Skylancer.

== Operators ==
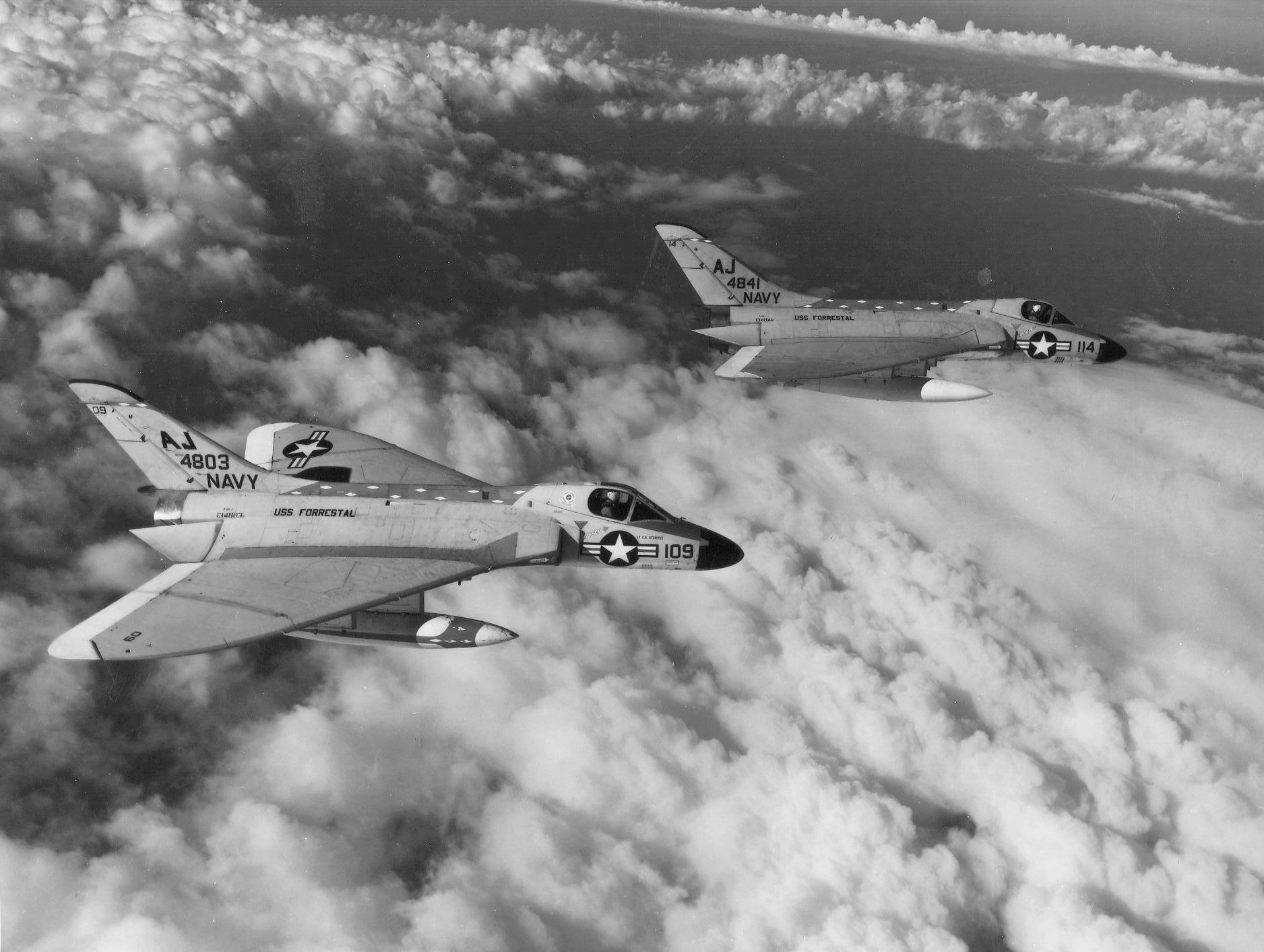
Formation of two VF-102 F4D-1 Skyrays

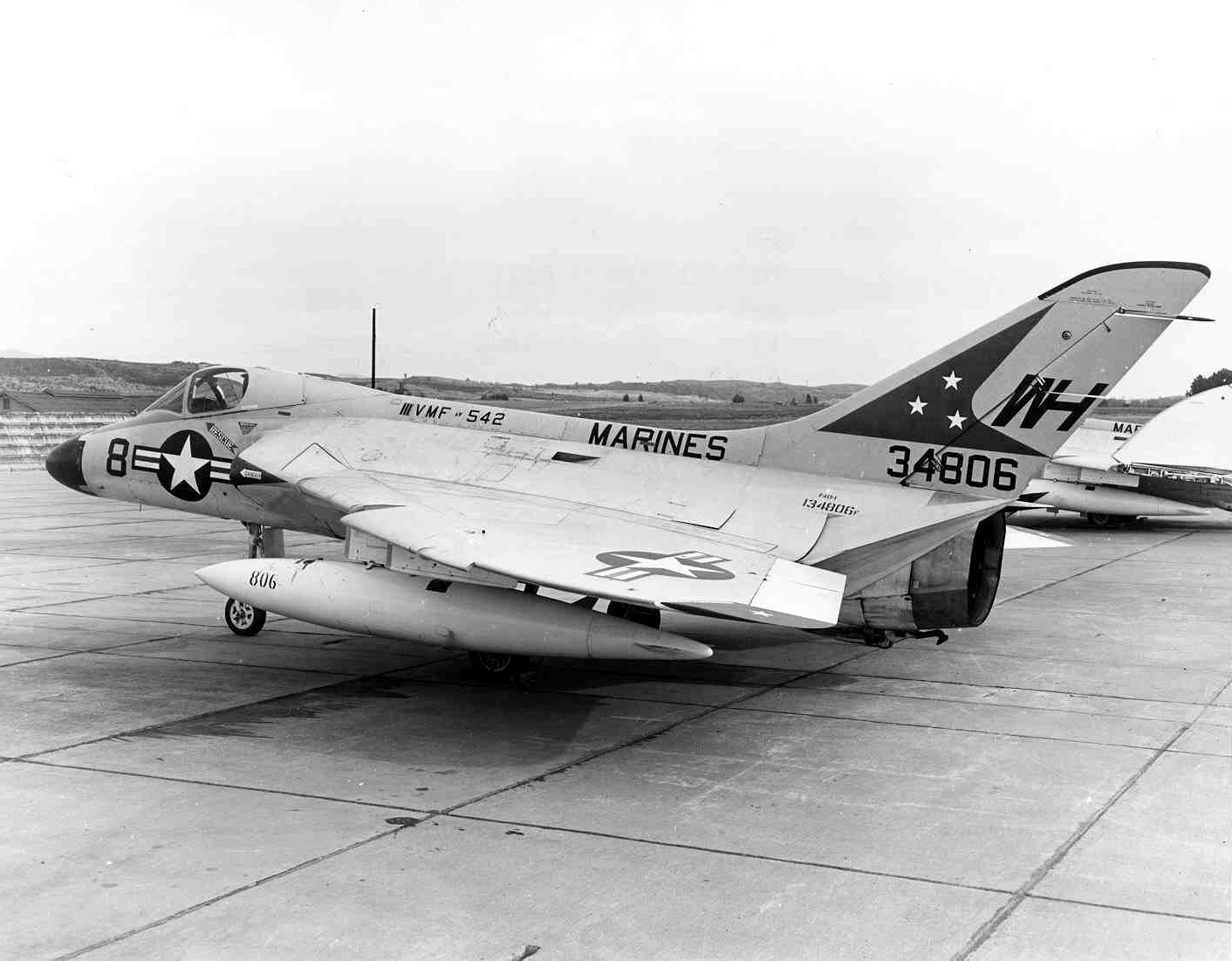
F4D-1 of VMF-542

United States

- United States Navy
  - VFAW-3
  - VF-13
  - VF-21
  - VF-23
  - VF-51
  - VF-74
  - VF-101
  - VF-102
  - VF-141
  - VF-162
  - VF-213
  - VF-881
  - VF-882
- United States Marine Corps
  - VMF-113
  - VMF-114
  - VMF-115
  - VMF-215
  - VMF-314
  - VMF-513
  - VMFA-531
  - VMF(AW)-542
  - VX-3
- NACA/NASA

== Aircraft on display ==
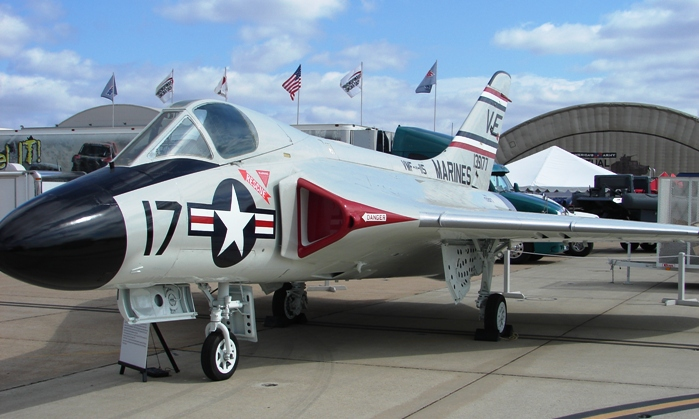
USMC F4D-1 BuNo 139177 from the Flying Leatherneck Aviation Museum

XF4D-1

- 124587 – In front of the main gate of Naval Air Weapons Station China Lake, California. It is on loan from the National Naval Aviation Museum, Naval Air Station Pensacola, Florida.

F4D-1 (F-6A)

- 134748 – Pima Air and Space Museum adjacent to Davis–Monthan Air Force Base in Tucson, Arizona. It is on loan from the National Naval Aviation Museum.
- 134764 – Naval Air Station Patuxent River in St. Mary's County, Maryland. It is on loan from the National Naval Aviation Museum.
- 134806 – National Naval Aviation Museum at Naval Air Station Pensacola, Florida.
- 134836 – Intrepid Sea, Air & Space Museum in New York City. Originally on display at the New England Air Museum before relocating to Intrepid in 2021.
- 134936 – Pueblo Weisbrod Aircraft Museum at Pueblo Memorial Airport, Colorado.
- 134950 – Aviation Heritage Park at Naval Air Station Oceana in Virginia Beach, Virginia. It is on loan from the National Naval Aviation Museum.
- 139177 – Flying Leatherneck Aviation Museum at Marine Corps Air Station Miramar in San Diego, California. It is on loan from the National Naval Aviation Museum.

== Specifications (F4D-1) ==
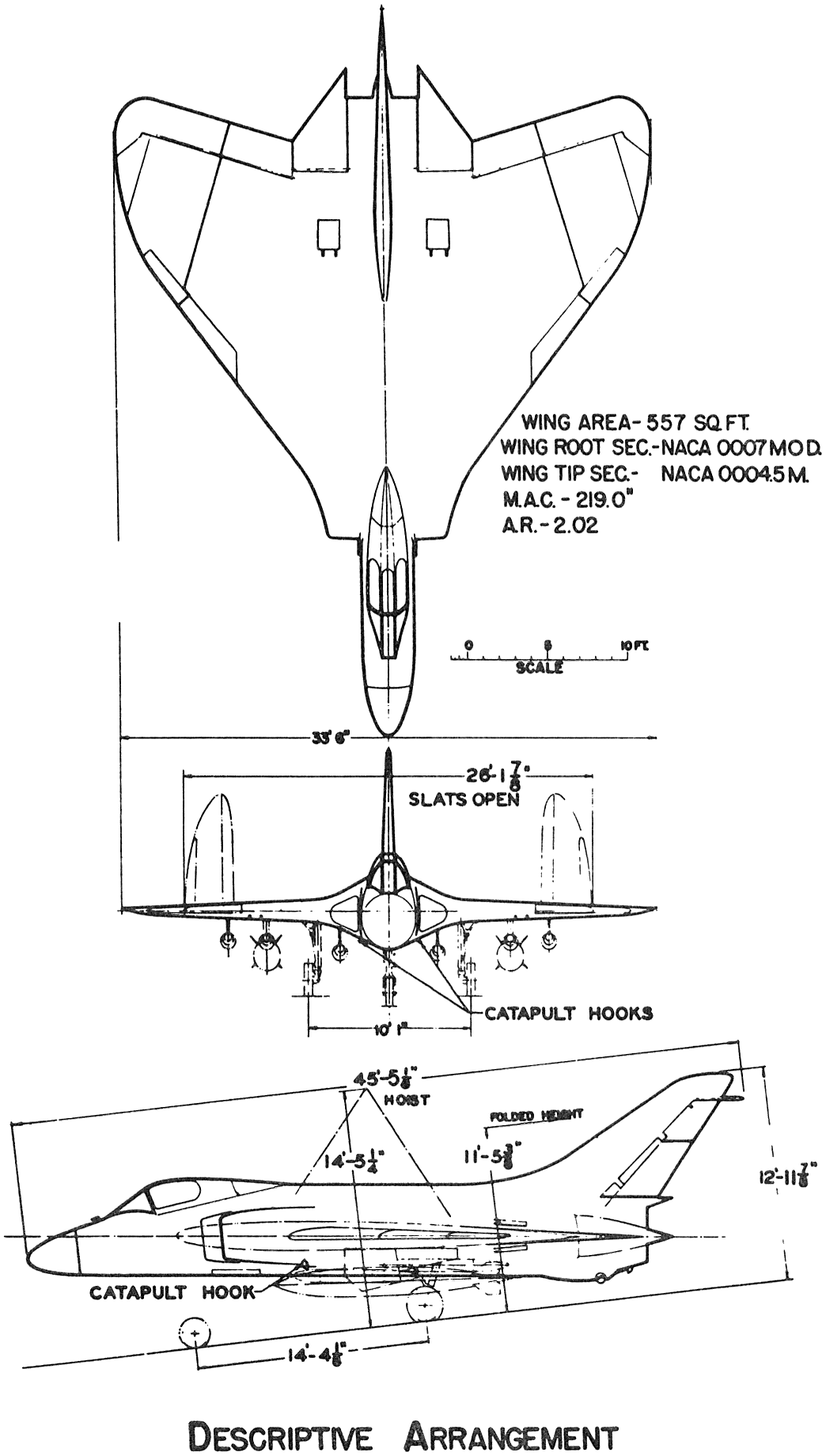
3-view line drawing of the Douglas F-6A Skyray

Data from The American Fighter

General characteristics

- Crew: 1
- Length: 45 ft 3 in (13.79 m)
- Wingspan: 33 ft 6 in (10.21 m)
- Height: 13 ft 0 in (3.96 m)
- Wing area: 557 sq ft (51.7 m^{2})
- Airfoil: root: NACA 0007-63/30-9.5; tip: NACA 0004-5 63/30-9.5
- Empty weight: 16,024 lb (7,268 kg)
- Gross weight: 22,648 lb (10,273 kg)
- Max takeoff weight: 27,116 lb (12,300 kg)
- Powerplant: 1 × Pratt & Whitney J57-P-8, −8A or −8B afterburning turbojet engine, 10,200 lbf (45 kN) thrust dry, 16,000 lbf (71 kN) with afterburner

Performance

- Maximum speed: 627 kn (722 mph, 1,161 km/h) at sea level
- Range: 610 nmi (700 mi, 1,130 km)
- Ferry range: 1,040 nmi (1,200 mi, 1,930 km)
- Service ceiling: 55,000 ft (17,000 m)
- Rate of climb: 18,300 ft/min (93 m/s)
- Wing loading: 41 lb/sq ft (200 kg/m^{2})
- Thrust/weight: 0.71

Armament

- Guns: 4 × 20 mm Colt Mk 12 cannon, two on each wing just aft of the leading edge, mid-wing, underside, with 65 rounds/gun
- Rockets:
  - 6 pods of 7 2.75 in (70 mm) unguided rockets or
  - 4 pods of 19 2.75 in (70 mm) unguided rockets
- Missiles: 4 × AIM-9 Sidewinder air-to-air missiles
- Bombs: 2 × 2,000 lb (907 kg) bombs

Avionics

- AN/APQ-50A – Fire-control radar
- AN/APQ-72 – Fire-control radar (replaced APQ-50)
- Westinghouse Aero 13F – Fire-control radar

== See also ==
Related development

- Douglas F5D Skylancer

Aircraft of comparable role, configuration, and era

- Dassault Super Mystere
- EFW N-20
- Grumman F-9 Cougar
- Grumman F-11 Tiger
- McDonnell F3H Demon
- North American FJ-4 Fury
- Vought F7U Cutlass

Related lists

- List of fighter aircraft
- List of United States Navy aircraft designations (pre-1962)
