= Kapsan County =

Kapsan County 갑산군
- County

Korean transcription(s)
  - Chosongul: 갑산군
  - Hanja: 甲山郡
  - McCune-Reischauer: Kapsan-gun
  - Revised Romanization: Gapsan-gun
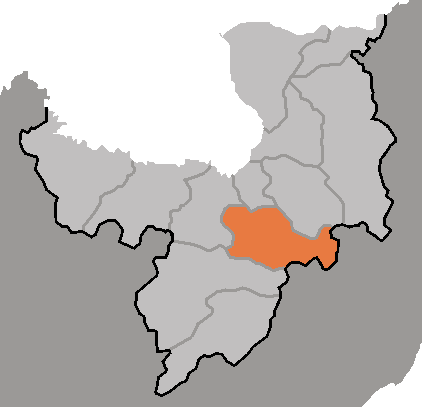
- Map of Ryanggang showing the location of Kapsan
- Coordinates: 41°07′22″N 128°23′11″E
- Country: North Korea
- Province: Ryanggang
- Administrative divisions: 1 ŭp, 4 workers' districts, 20 ri

Area
  - Total: 1,200 km^{2} (460 sq mi)

Population (2008)
  - Total: 70,611
  - Density: 59/km^{2} (150/sq mi)

Kapsan is a kun, or county, in Ryanggang Province, North Korea. During Joseon, officials who had fallen into disfavour were often sent into internal exile there.

== Geography ==
Kapsan lies on the eastern edge of the Kaema Plateau. The highest peak is Tongjomryongsan (동점령산, 2113 m). Although the majority of the county's area is mountainous, the terrain slopes downward toward the center and the Kapsan Basin. The county's chief stream is the Hochon River (허천강). Cultivation is largely restricted to the basin and river valley. Some 85% of the county's area is forestland. Due to its location on the Kaema Plateau, Kapsan has a severely cold continental climate.

== Administrative divisions ==
Kapsan county is divided into 1 ŭp (town). 4 rodongjagu (workers' districts) and 20 ri (villages):

- Kapsan-ŭp (갑산읍)
- Mullakp'yŏng-rodongjagu (문락평로동자구)
- O-il-lodongjagu
  (5.1-lodongjagu) (오일로동자구)
- Sang'il-lodongjagu (삼일로동자구)
- Tongjŏm-rodongjagu (동점로동자구)
- Ch'angsong-ri (창송리)
- Choyang-ri (조양리)
- Chungch'ŏl-li (중천리)
- Ch'angdong-ri (창동리)
- Ch'ŏnsŏng-ri (천성리)
- Ch'up'yŏng-ri (추풍리)
- Hoeril-li (회린리)
- Kŭmp'ung-ri (금풍리)
- Namp'yŏng-ri (남평리)
- P'yŏnghwa-ri (평화리)
- Rimdong-ri (림동리)
- Sach'ang-ri (사창리)
- Sadong-ri (사동리)
- Sambong-ri (삼봉리)
- Sanghŭng-ri (상흥리)
- Sap'yŏng-ri (사평리)
- Sinjŏng-ri (신정리)
- Songam-ri (송암리)
- Taejung-ri (대중리)
- Yanghŭng-ri (양흥리)

== Economy ==
The chief local industry is agriculture; major crops include rice (raised along the Hochon), as well as potatoes, hops, and honey. The 5.1 Workers' District (오일로동자구) specializes in hops production; these "5.1 Hops" are exported to other countries. Lumbering also plays a role, thanks to the extensive forests. There are various mineral deposits in the county, including lodes of copper, coal and copper pyrite.

== Transportation ==
There is a cable car railway in the county with a length of 70-ri (27.4 km); it is by this method that coal is brought from Kapsan mine to the train station in Kumdok to be loaded to be smelted.

Kapsan County has a 10-ri (3.9 km) long trolleybus line at a mining village, however it is not specified which particular area it is in.

== History ==
During the Korean War (1950-1953), South Korean guerrillas passed word to United Nations forces that a large number of top North Korean Communist leaders planned to gather in Kapsan in October 1951. Based on this information, on 30 October eight AD Skyraider bombers from United States Navy VF-54 and eight ADs from VA-728 escorted by four F2-H2s from VF-172, eight F4U-4s from VF-53, eight F4U-4s from VF-713 and four F9-F2s from VF-831 attacked their meeting place with 1,000-pound (454-kg) bombs and napalm. Intelligence evaluation indicated that the attack killed 500 Communists.

== See also ==
- Geography of North Korea
- Administrative divisions of North Korea
- Kapsan faction incident
