= VA12 =

VA-12 has the following meanings:

- Attack Squadron 12 (U.S. Navy)
- Virginia State Route 12 (disambiguation)
- Virginia's 12th congressional district
- VA-12 (Valladolid), a highway in Spain
