= VMF(AW)-114 =

Marine All-Weather Fighter Squadron 114
- VMF(AW)-114 Insignia
- Active: 1 July 1943 – 1 July 1963
- Country: United States
- Branch: USMC
- Type: Fighter squadron
- Role: Air interdiction
- Part of: Inactive
- Nickname(s): Death Dealers
- Tail Code: LK later EK
- Engagements: World War II * Battle of Peleliu

Aircraft flown
- Fighter: F4U Corsair; F9F-8 Cougar; F2H Banshee; F4D Skyray

Marine All-Weather Fighter Squadron 114 (VMF(AW)-114) was a squadron of the United States Marine Corps that was originally commissioned during World War II. Nicknamed the "Death Dealers", the squadron saw the most action during the war providing close air support during the Battle of Peleliu. The squadron remained on active duty until being decommissioned in 1963.

== History ==
=== World War II ===
Marine Fighting Squadron 114 was commissioned on 1 July 1943, at Marine Corps Air Station El Toro. The squadron remained on the West Coast of the United States until 16 October 1943, when it then transferred to Marine Corps Air Station Ewa, Hawaii. In Hawaii, squadron pilots continued their training until moving to Midway Island on 18 December 1943. VMF-114 returned to Ewa in February 1944 and in March they moved first to Espiritu Santo and the Green Island. While there, they flew strike missions against Japanese garrisons that had been bypassed in the Bismarck Islands.

The first major combat that VMF-114 took part in was the Battle of Peleliu. The squadron arrived on Peleliu on 17 September 1944, and provided most of the close air support (CAS) for Marine Corps forces during the course of the battle. The squadron also provided the preparatory bombing and CAS for the 3rd Battalion, 5th Marines when the battalion assaulted Ngesebus during the battle. The terrain on the island, earlier judged unsuitable for anything but the costliest and most difficult advances, was made passable with the aid of preparatory fire-scouring by napalm bombs from 114. MajGen William H. Rupertus, the Commanding General of the 1st Marine Division on Peleliu would say following the battle that the air support provided during the campaign was, "executed in a manner leaving little to be desired." Following the battle, they remained based on the island again assuming the role of attacking bypassed Japanese garrisons in the vicinity of the western Caroline Islands. The squadron remained in the area until they ceased combat operations on 1 June 1945.

=== Post-war years ===
Following the war, VMF-114 escaped the post-war drawdown of forces and were transferred to Marine Corps Air Station Cherry Point in February 1946. On 16 April 1946, 24 planes from VMF-114 departed Naval Station Norfolk, Virginia, onboard the USS Salerno Bay sailing for the Caribbean Sea. During this short deployment the squadron provided close air support during the simulated amphibious landings conducted by the 1st Marine Brigade at Culebra, Puerto Rico. In August 1947, the squadron was redesignated Marine Night Fighter Squadron 114 (VMF(N)-114) after they were reequipped with the nightfighter version of the F4U Corsair. Within a few years, the squadron transitioned to the F2H Banshee and on 1 June 1953, they were again redesignated VMF-114. On 7 January 1953, the squadron deployed to the Mediterranean Sea as part of Carrier Air Group 10 (CVG-10) on board the USS Tarawa (CVA-40). They returned from this deployment on 3 July 1953.

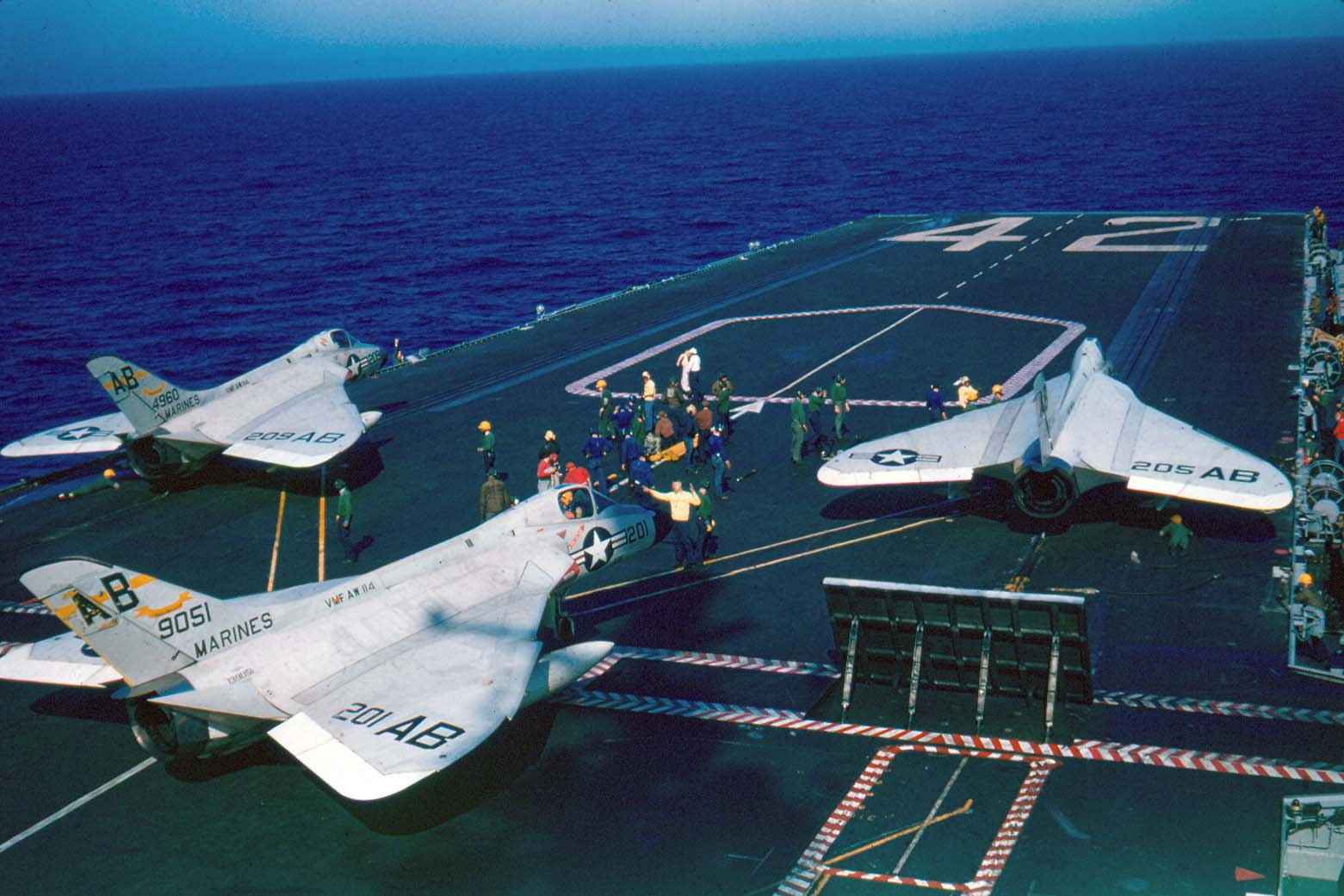
VMF(AW)-114 F4Ds on FDR, in 1959.

The squadron transitioned to the F9F-8 Cougar, in 1955, and then to the F4D Skyray, on 1 May 1957. The squadron was redesignated a Fixed-Wing Marine All Weather Fighter Squadron, (VMF(AW)-114) at that time. From 13 February 1959 – 1 September 1959, the squadron was deployed as part of Carrier Air Group 1 (CVG-1) on board the USS Franklin D. Roosevelt (CVA-42) for a cruise in the Mediterranean. The squadron lost two pilots on this tour. Major Robert W. Minick was killed in a landing accident aboard the carrier, on 15 January 1959. 1Lt. William Denima died on 24 July 1959, when he inadvertently shut off his engine and impacted the ocean surface while attempting an airstart. Upon their return they went back to the normal deployment rotation, including a stint at Naval Air Station Roosevelt Roads. In January 1961, the squadron was transferred to Naval Air Facility Atsugi, Japan, where they served until the squadron was decommissioned on 1 July 1963.

== Awards ==
- Navy Unit Commendation 15 September 1944 – 31 January 1945

== See also ==
- United States Marine Corps Aviation
- List of active United States Marine Corps aircraft squadrons
- List of inactive United States Marine Corps aircraft squadrons
