= VA-12 =

Attack Squadron 12
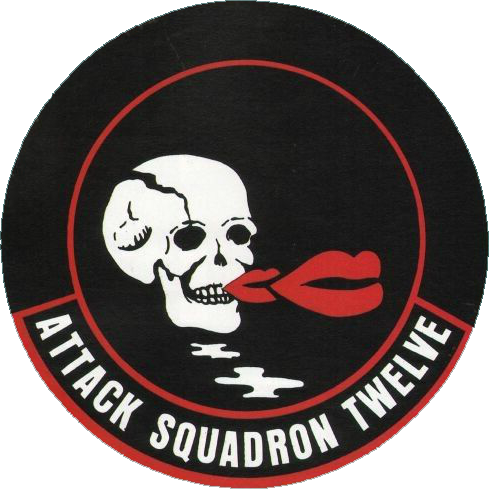
- VA-12's insignia
- Active: 12 May 1945 – 1 October 1986
- Country: United States
- Branch: United States Navy
- Role: Attack
- Size: Squadron
- Nickname(s): Flying Ubangis
- Motto(s): Kiss of death

Aircraft flown
- Attack: A-4 Skyhawk; A-7 Corsair II
- Fighter: F4U Corsair; F8F Bearcat; F2H Banshee; F7U Cutlass

Attack Squadron 12 (VA-12), also known as the "Flying Ubangis" or "Clinchers", was an attack squadron of the United States Navy active during the Cold War. From their home port at Naval Air Station Cecil Field in Florida, the squadron made more than thirty major overseas deployments aboard aircraft carriers, primarily flying A-4 Skyhawk and later the A-7E Corsair II, including two combat tours in the Vietnam War.

== History ==
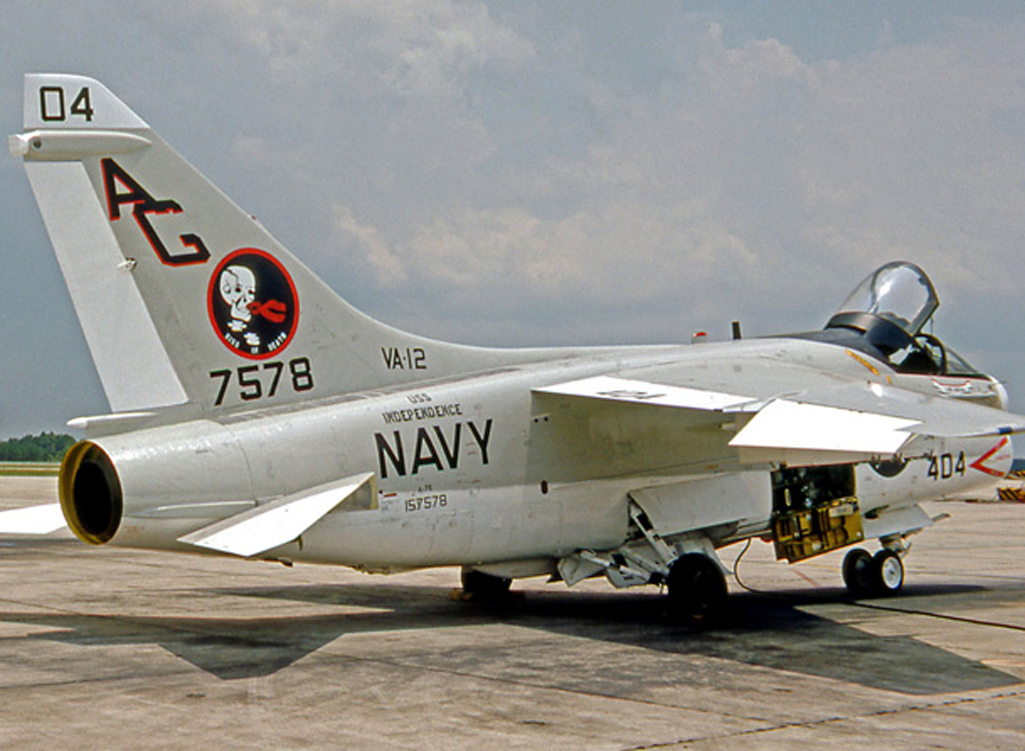
Corsair II of VA-12 Squadron in 1976

The squadron was established on 12 May 1945, as Bomber-Fighter Squadron FOUR (VBF-4) and soon after was redesignated as part of the service-wide reorganization of aircraft squadrons as Fighter Squadron TWO (VF-2A) on 15 November 1946. Upon the Navy's return to its pre-1946 system of nomenclature, the squadron was again redesignated, this time as Fighter Squadron TWELVE (VF-12) on 2 August 1948. Fully embracing the attack role, the squadron was given its final designation Attack Squadron TWELVE (VA-12) on 1 August 1955.

During WestPac in 1955, the squadron was part of the Navy's support of the evacuation of the Tachen Islands which were under bombardment by People's Republic of China forces. After returning from this cruise, the squadron re-equipped with the F7U Cutlass and its role was changed from air interception to ground attack with special weapons.

In 1960, VA-12 was part of airwing of the USS Shangri-La when that carrier was deployed to counter Cuban infiltration into Guatemala and Nicaragua. The next year, the squadron returned to the area aboard USS Franklin D. Roosevelt to support the government of the Dominican Republic.

In 1963 the squadron was deployed in detachments to the USS Essex and USS Intrepid for anti-submarine warfare exercises. In August of the next year, the squadron was again on board the Roosevelt when the carrier was deployed to the eastern Mediterranean in response to trouble between Greeks and Turks on the island of Cyprus.

The squadron saw combat in Vietnam twice, in 1966 and 1970. Later in 1971, the unit relinquished the A-4 for the A-7 Corsair. 1973 and 1974 saw further trouble in the Mediterranean. 1973 saw the Yom Kippur War and 1974 the assassination of the American ambassador to Cyprus. During the 1970s the squadron's home base was at Cecil Field Naval Air Station near Jacksonville, Florida. In 1980, the Iranian hostage crisis saw the USS Dwight D. Eisenhower with the squadron on board. The ship remained at sea for 254 days continuously. Trouble in Lebanon flared in 1983, and the squadron supported the peacekeeping force in the country.

On 1 October 1986, the squadron was disestablished, ending 31 years of service as an attack unit, and ten years prior to that as a fighter unit.

Major overseas deployments by Attack Squadron 12
Departure	Return	Area of operations	Aircraft carrier	Air wing	Aircraft used
1946 June 28	1946 July 15	Panama Canal transit	USS Tarawa (CV-40)	Carrier Air Group Four	F4U-4 Corsair
1946 August 1	1947 April 29	Western Pacific	USS Tarawa	Carrier Air Group Four; Attack Carrier Air Group One	F4U-4 Corsair
1948 October 1	1949 February 21	World cruise	USS Tarawa	Carrier Air Group One	F8F-1 Bearcat
1951 March 20	1951 October 6	Mediterranean Sea	USS Coral Sea (CVB-43)	Carrier Air Group One	F2H-2 Banshee
1952 May 24	1952 October 11	Mediterranean and North Atlantic	USS Wasp (CV-18)	Carrier Air Group One	F2H-2 Banshee
1953 June 11	1953 December 3	Mediterranean	USS Franklin D. Roosevelt (CVA-42)	Carrier Air Group One	F2H-2 Banshee
1954 December 27	1955 July 14	World cruise	USS Midway (CVA-41)	Carrier Air Group One	F2H-2 Banshee
1958 September 2	1959 March 12	Mediterranean	USS Forrestal (CVA-59)	Carrier Air Group Ten	A4D-2 Skyhawk
1960 September 6	1960 October 20	North Atlantic	USS Shangri-La (CVA-38)	Carrier Air Group Ten	A4D-2 Skyhawk
1960 November 4	1960 November 27	Caribbean Sea	USS Shangri-La	Carrier Air Group Ten	A4D-2 Skyhawk
1961 February 15	1961 August 28	Mediterranean	USS Franklin D. Roosevelt	Carrier Air Group One	A4D-2 Skyhawk

== Aircraft ==
The squadron was assigned the following aircraft as of the dates shown:

Grumman F6F Hellcat
F6F from 23 May 1945 and F6F-5P from May 1947
Vought F4U Corsair
F4U-1, F4U-1D, FG-1, and FG-1D from 23 May 1945 and F4U-4 from 30 September 1945
Grumman F8F Bearcat
F8F-1 and F8F-1B from May 1947
McDonnell F2H Banshee
F2H-1 and F2H-2 from 1 September 1950
Vought F7U Cutlass
F7U-3 from December 1955
Douglas A-4 Skyhawk
A4D-1 from April 1957, A4D-2 from January 1958, A4D-2N (A-4C) from 8 January 1962, and A-4E from 8 March 1965
Vought A-7 Corsair II
A-7E from 1 April 1971

== Air wing assignment ==
The squadron was assigned to the following Air Wings as of the dates shown:

- CVG-4: 12 May 1945 (tail code "T"), redesignated
- CVAG-1: 15 November 1946 (tail code "T"), redesignated
- CVG-1: 1 September 1948 (tail code "T")
- CVG-10: 20 January 1958 (tail code "AK")
- CVG-1: 5 December 1960 (tail code "AB"), redesignated
- CVW-1: 20 December 1963 (tail code "AB")
- CVW-8: 25 August 1968 (tail code "AJ")
- CVW-7: 1971 (tail code "AG")

== Incidents and accidents ==
- 1945 October 6: The squadron's commanding officer, Lieutenant Commander John H. Lackey, died in the crash of his SNJ during a training flight.

== Gallery ==
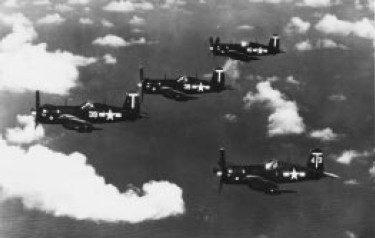
F4Us from VBF-4 near Saipan, in 1946.

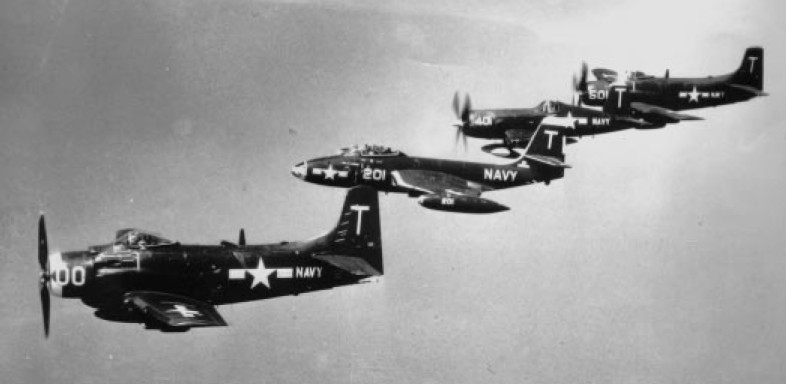
A VF-12 F2H-2 with CVG-1 planes, in 1952.

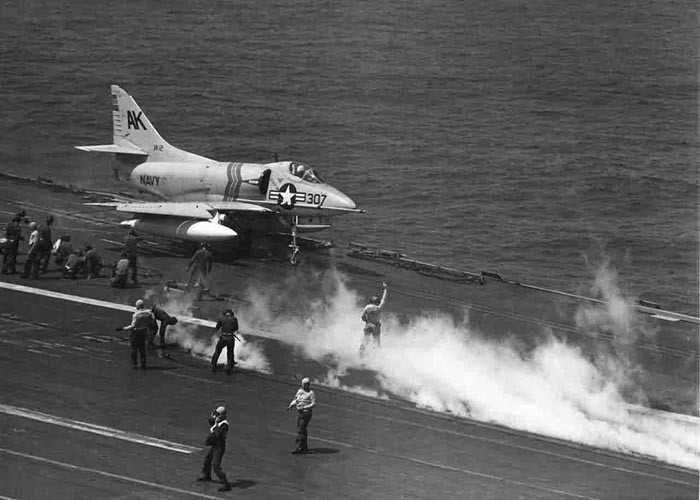
A4D-2 of VA-12 launching from Forrestal, in 1959.

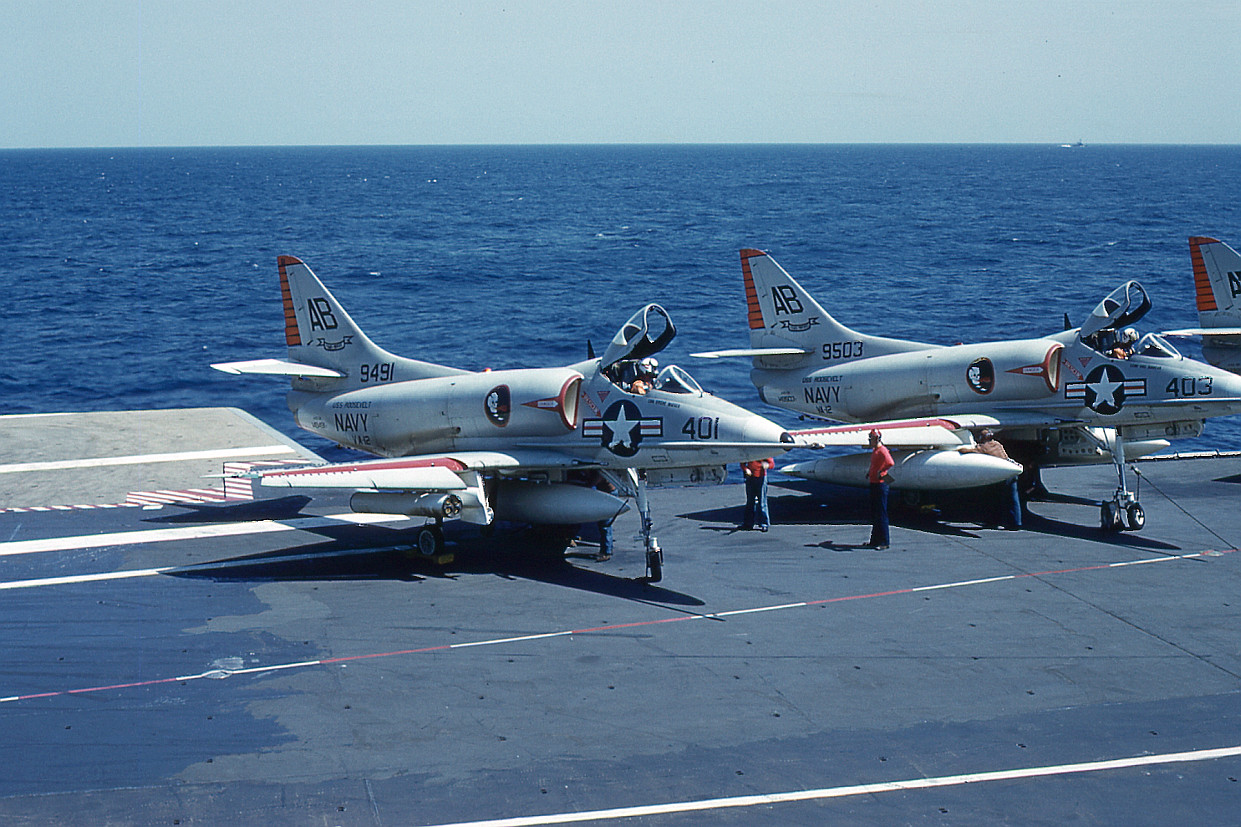
VA-12 A-4Cs on FDR, in 1962–64.

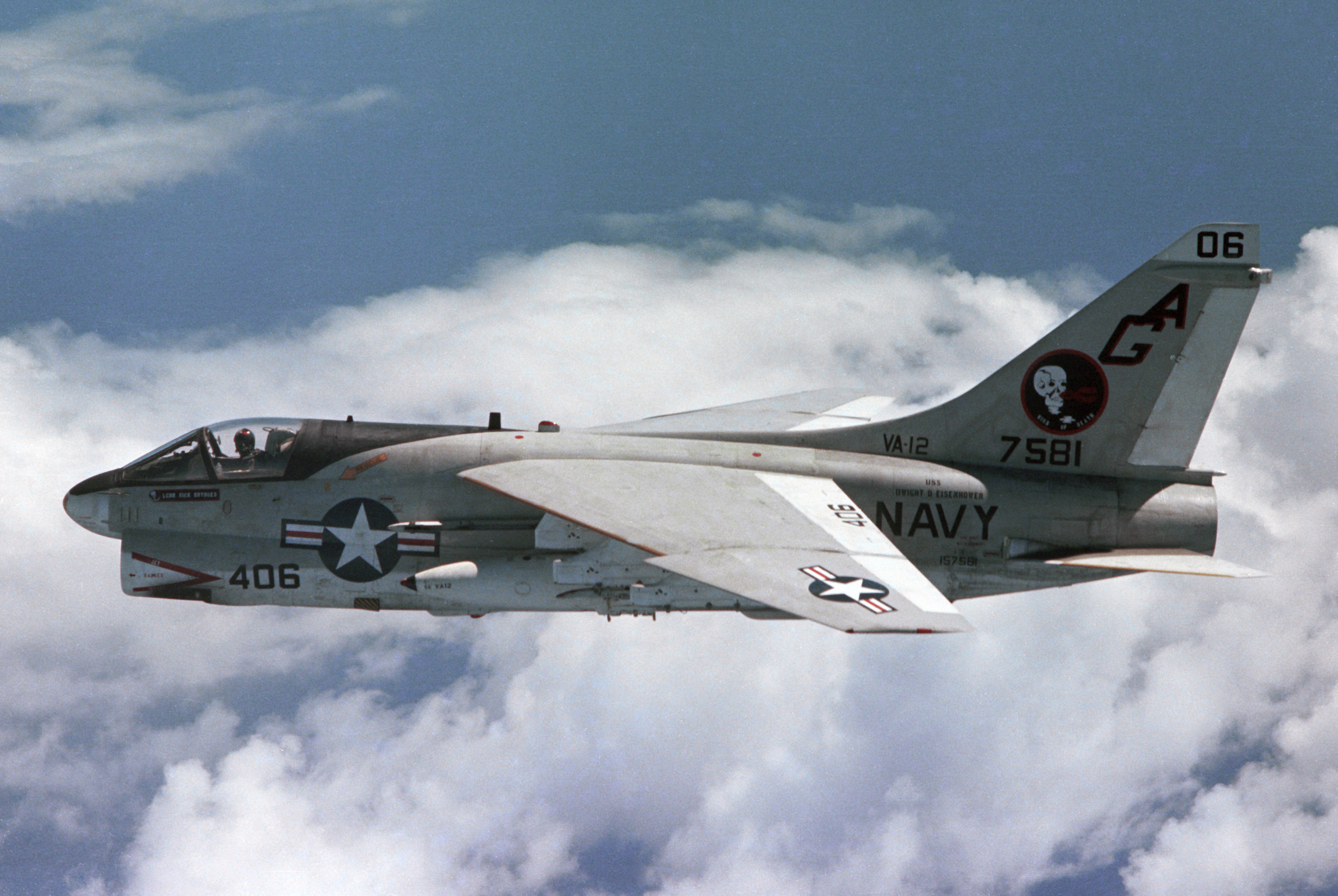
A VA-12 A-7E in the 1970s.

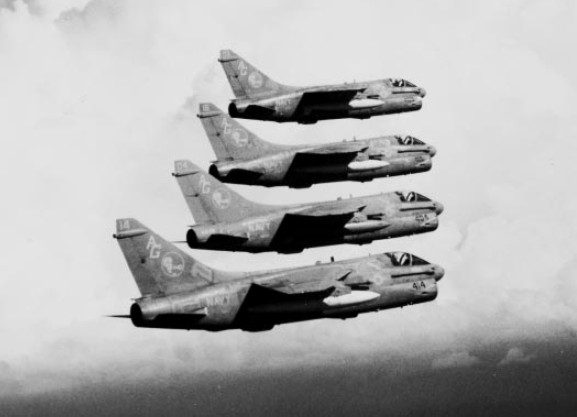
VA-12 A-7Es in 1980s low visibility paint scheme

== See also ==
- History of the United States Navy
- List of inactive United States Navy aircraft squadrons
- List of United States Navy aircraft squadrons
