= VF-22 =

Fighter Squadron 22
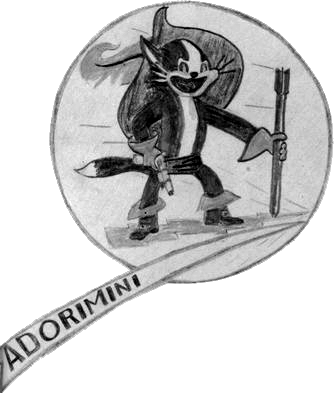
- Active: 1 May 1945 – 6 June 1958
- Country: United States
- Branch: United States Navy
- Role: Fighter aircraft
- Part of: Inactive
- Engagements: Korean War

Aircraft flown
- Fighter: F4U-4 Corsair; F2H-2 Banshee

Fighter Squadron 22 or VF-22 was an aviation unit of the United States Navy. Originally established as Bombing Fighting Squadron 74A (VBF-74A) on 1 May 1945, it was redesignated VBF-74 on 1 August 1945, redesignated as VF-2B on 15 November 1946, redesignated as VF-22 on 1 September 1948, it was disestablished on 6 June 1958.

== Operational history ==
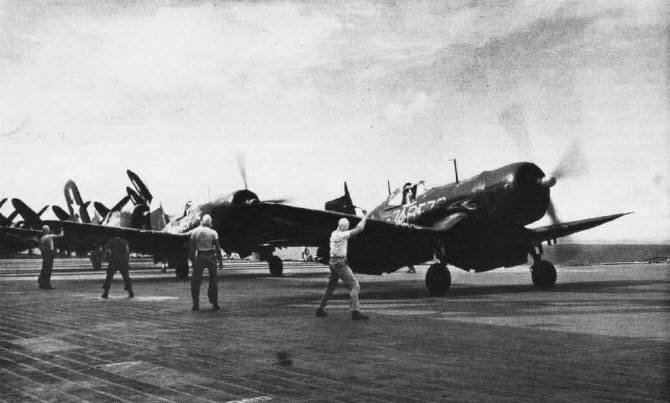
VBF-74 F4U-4s prepare to launch from USS Midway in 1945

VBF-74 equipped with F4U-4 Corsairs was assigned to Carrier Air Group 74 (CVBG-74) aboard USS Midway on her shakedown cruise to the Caribbean from 7 November 1945 to 2 January 1946.

VF-22 equipped with F2H-2 Banshees was assigned to Carrier Air Group 4 (CVG-4) aboard USS Lake Champlain for a deployment to Korea and the Western Pacific from 26 April to 4 December 1953. The squadron lost 2 F2H-2s and their pilots during this deployment.

== Aircraft assignment ==
- F4U-4 Corsair
- F2H-2 Banshee

== See also ==
- History of the United States Navy
- List of inactive United States Navy aircraft squadrons
- List of United States Navy aircraft squadrons
