= VA-172 (U.S. Navy) =

Attack Squadron 172
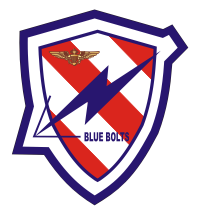
- VA-172 squadron patch
- Active: 20 August 1945 – 15 January 1971
- Country: United States
- Branch: United States Navy
- Role: Attack aircraft
- Part of: Inactive
- Nickname(s): Checkmates; Blue Bolts
- Engagements: Korean War; Vietnam War

Aircraft flown
- Attack: F6F Hellcat; F4U Corsair; F8F Bearcat; FH-1 Phantom; F2H Banshee; A-4 Skyhawk

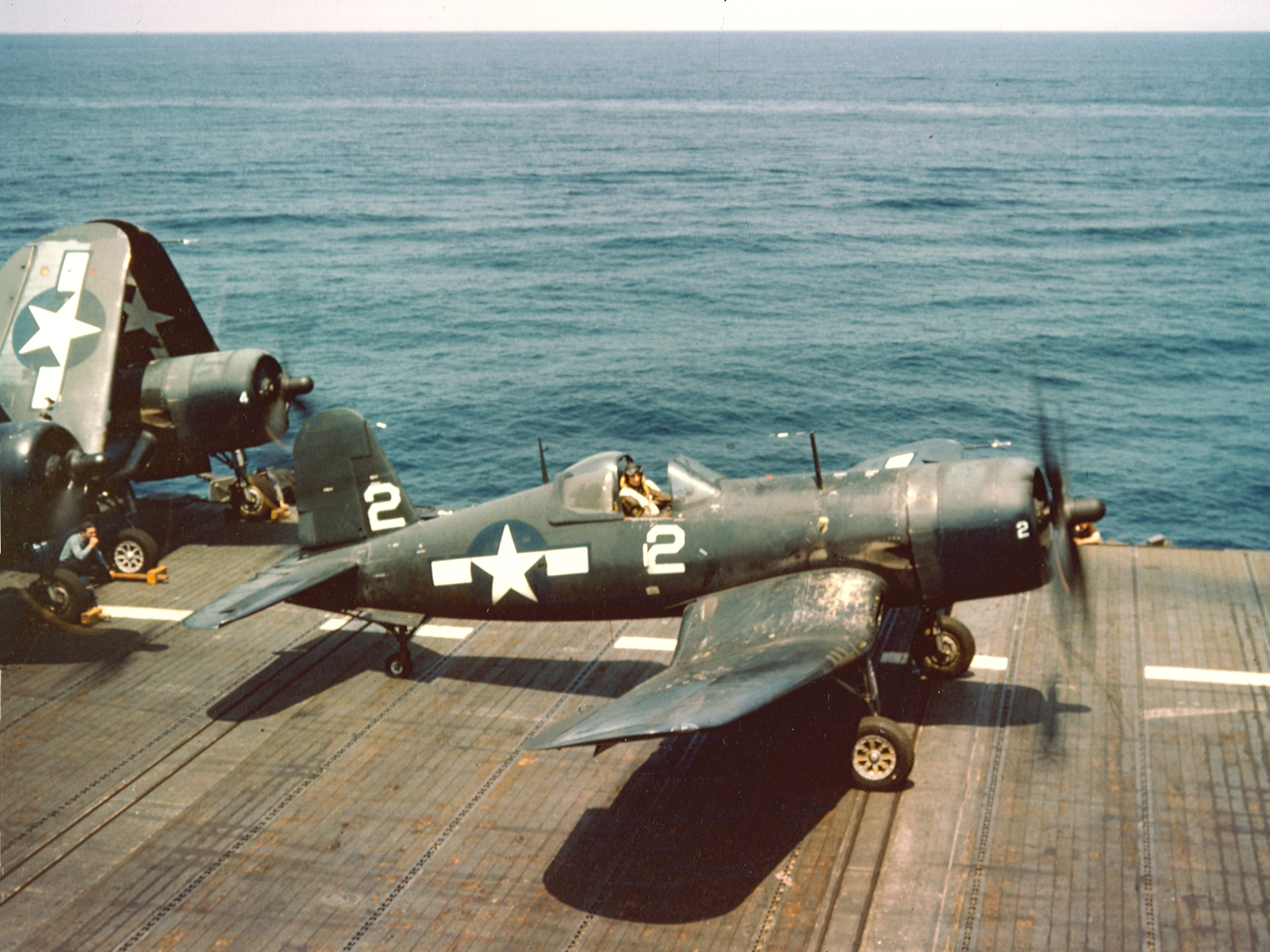
VBF-82 F4U on USS Randolph c.1946

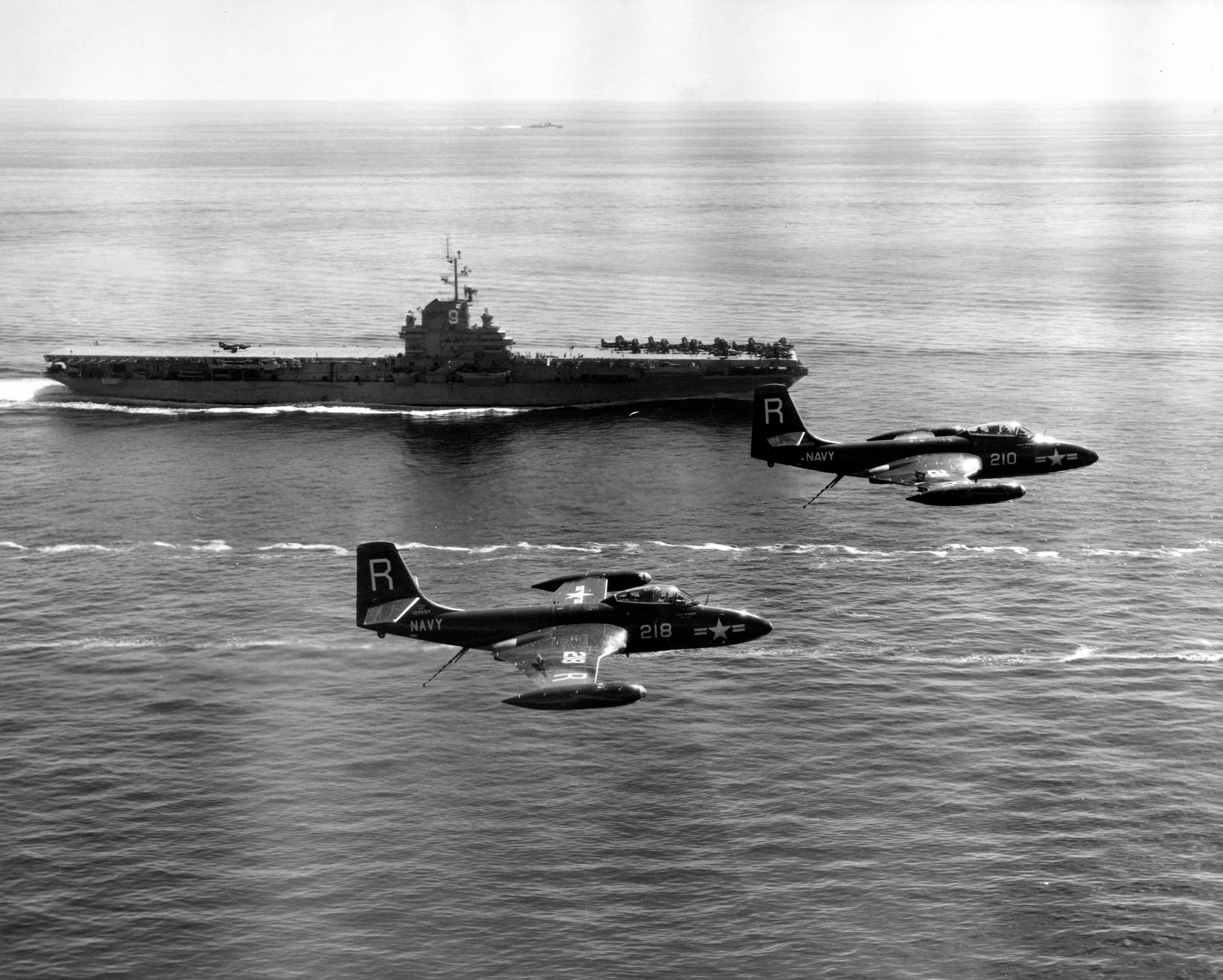
VF-172 F2Hs over USS Essex c.1951

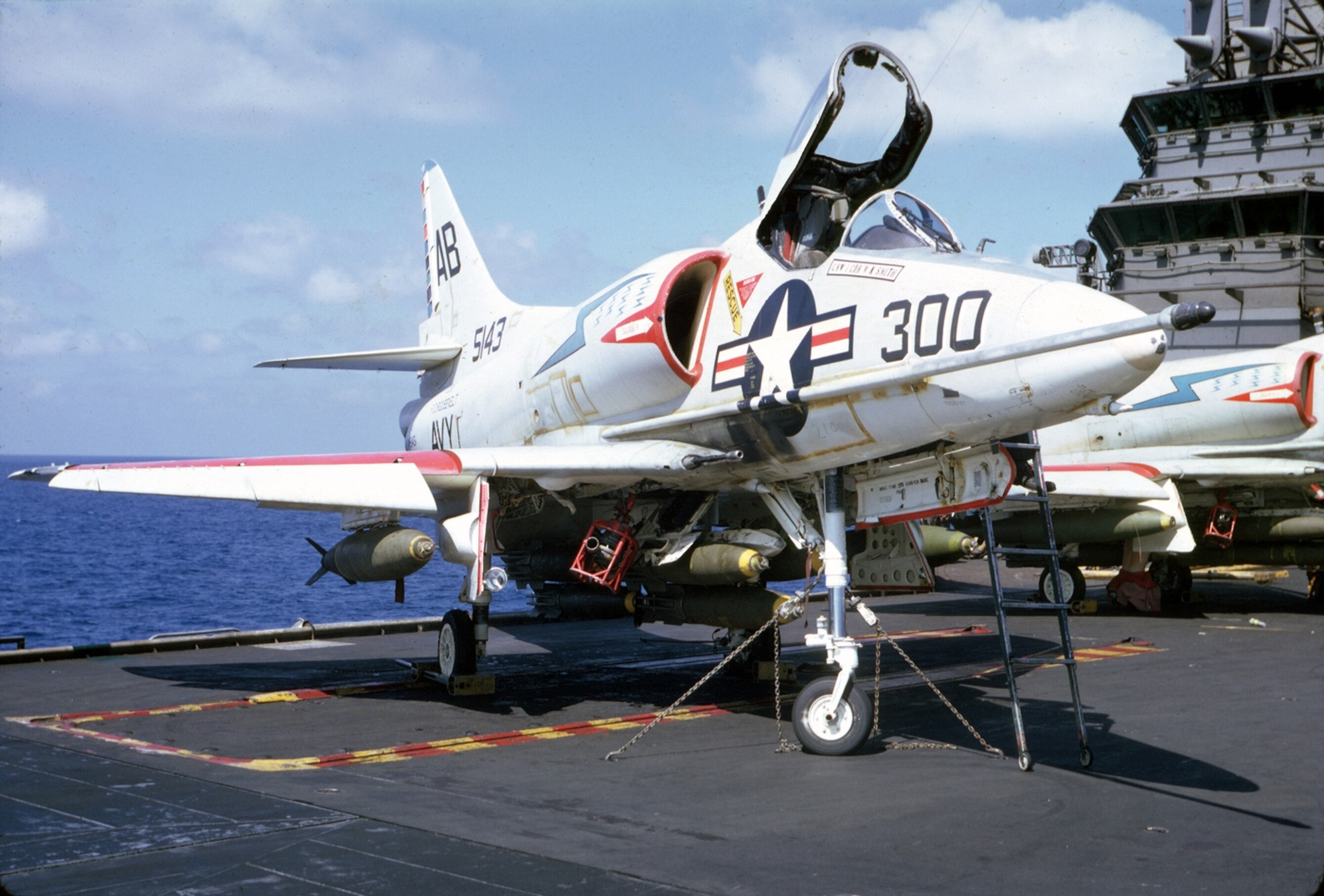
VA-172 A-4C fully armed with bombs on the flight deck of the USS Franklin D. Roosevelt off Vietnam, 1966. Note the blue lightning bolt painted on both aircraft.

VA-172 was an Attack Squadron of the United States Navy. It was established as Bomber Fighter Squadron VBF-82 on 20 August 1945, redesignated as Fighter Squadron VF-18A on 15 November 1946, as VF-172 on 11 August 1948, and as VA-172 on 1 November 1955. The squadron was disestablished on 15 January 1971. Its nickname was the Checkmates from 1946 to 1950, and the Blue Bolts thereafter.

== Operational history ==
- 28 Jan 1949: Squadron aircraft, while secured to the flight deck and engines running, were used to assist in berthing USS Midway in Augusta, Sicily. This procedure is known as Operation Pinwheel.
- 23 Aug 1951: The squadron participated in its first combat sortie over Korea. This also marked the first use of the F2H-2 in combat.
- 25 Aug 1951: The squadron's F2H-2 aircraft, along with F9Fs from VF-51, provided escort for 30 U.S. Air Force B-29 bombers raiding the marshalling yards at Rashin, North Korea.
- Nov–Dec 1956: USS Franklin D. Roosevelt, with VA-172 embarked, was ordered to deploy and operate off the coast of Spain as a result of the Suez Crisis.
- Sep–Oct 1957: A detachment of squadron's F2H-2 aircraft were embarked on USS Tarawa to provide fighter support for the antisubmarine warfare (ASW) carrier during a NATO exercise in the North Atlantic.
- Nov 1961: VA-172, embarked on Roosevelt, operated off the coast of the Dominican Republic to support the newly established democratic government.
- May 1963: Roosevelt, with VA-172 embarked, deployed to the Caribbean and operated off the coast of Haiti in response to a rebel attempt to overthrow the Haitian government.
- Jul–Sep 1963: A detachment from the squadron was deployed aboard USS Randolph to provide fighter coverage for the ASW Task Group during operations in the Caribbean Sea.
- 8–29 Aug 1964: Roosevelt, with VA-172 embarked, was ordered to operate in the vicinity of Cyprus after fighting escalated between Turkish and Greek forces on the island.
- Aug 1966: The squadron commenced combat operations in Vietnam. These were its first combat sorties since the Korean War in 1952.
- 2 Dec 1966: The squadron's commanding officer, Commander Bruce A. Nystrom, was lost in a night reconnaissance mission over the Red River delta area in North Vietnam.

== Home port assignments ==
The squadron was assigned to these home ports, effective on the dates shown:

- NAS Alameda – 20 Aug 1945
- NAS Quonset Point – 15 Jan 1946
- NAAS Cecil Field – 4 Mar 1949
- NAS Jacksonville – 24 Mar 1950
- NAS Cecil Field – 22 Feb 1958

== Aircraft assignment ==
The squadron first received the following aircraft on the dates shown:

- F6F-5 Hellcat – Aug 1945
- F4U Corsair – 6 Sep 1945
- F8F Bearcat – 1946
- FH-1 Phantom – Mar 1949
- F2H-1 Banshee – May 1949
- F2H-2 Banshee – 21 Jun 1950
- F2H-4 Banshee – 13 Jan 1956
- F2H-2B Banshee – Sep 1956
- A4D-1 Skyhawk – 16 Dec 1957
- A4D-2 Skyhawk – May 1958
- A4C Skyhawk – 6 Sep 1961

== See also ==
- List of squadrons in the Dictionary of American Naval Aviation Squadrons
- Attack aircraft
- List of inactive United States Navy aircraft squadrons
- History of the United States Navy
