= Virginia State Route 12 =

The following highways in Virginia have been known as State Route 12:

- State Route 12, 1918–1933, originally Abingdon to Suffolk, now mainly U.S. Route 58#Virginia
- State Route 12, 1933 – mid-1930s, now U.S. Route 220 in Virginia from Troutville to Clifton Forge
- State Route 12, 1935–1953, now U.S. Route 340 in Virginia from Greenville to Berryville
