= VA-152 (U.S. Navy) =

Attack Squadron 152
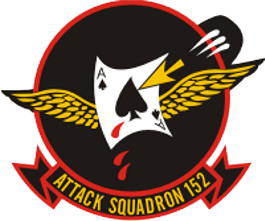
- VA-152 squadron patch
- Active: 1 February 1951 – 29 January 1971
- Country: United States
- Branch: United States Navy
- Role: Attack aircraft
- Part of: Inactive
- Nickname(s): Mavericks
- Engagements: Korean War; Vietnam War

Aircraft flown
- Attack: F4U Corsair; F2H Banshee; A-1 Skyraider; A-4 Skyhawk

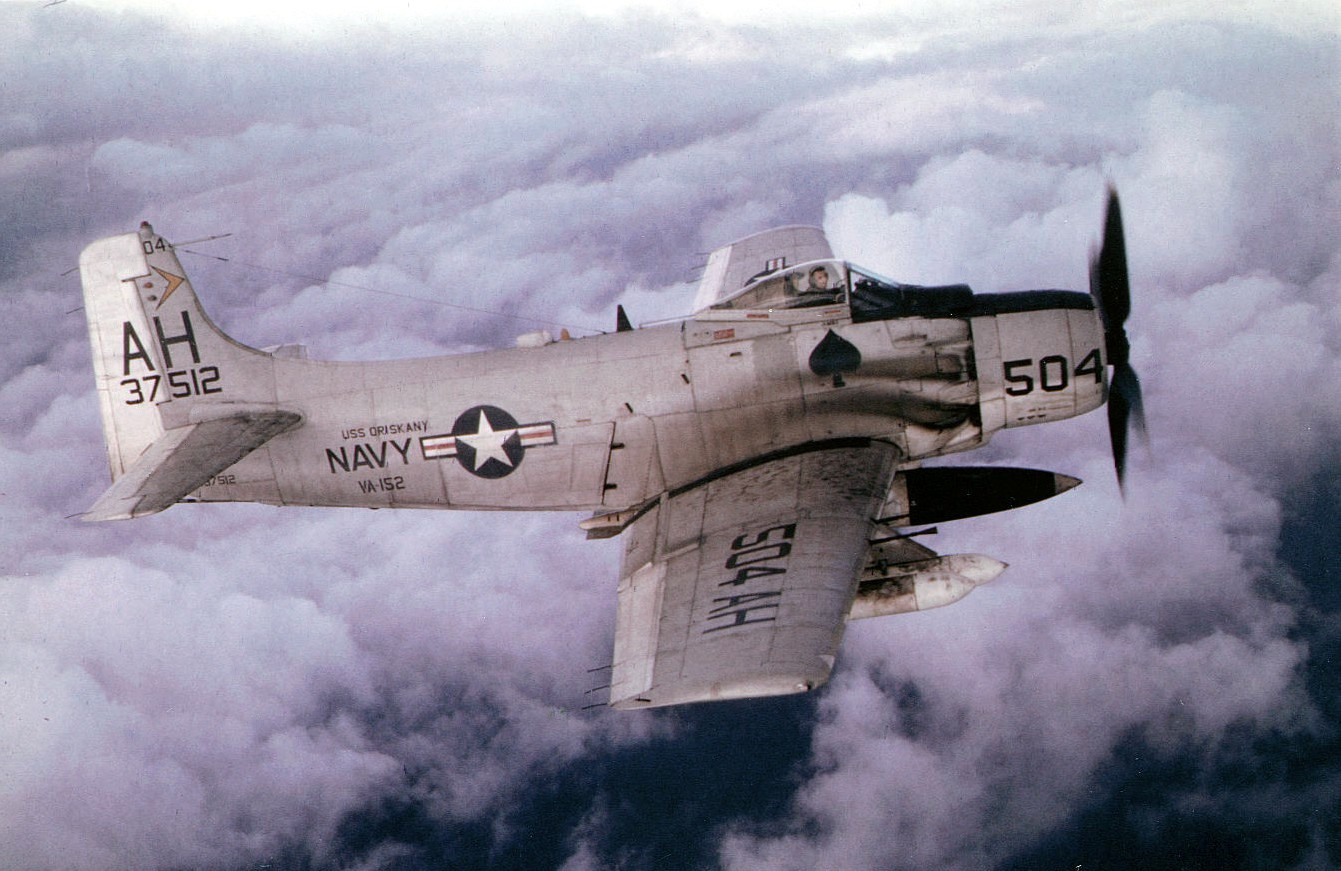
Skyraider of the VA-152 Friendlies in flight in 1966.

VA-152 was an Attack Squadron of the United States Navy, nicknamed the Fighting Aces from 1953 to 1956, the Friendly Squadron or Friendlies from 1957 to 1968, and the Mavericks thereafter.

The squadron was established as Reserve Fighter Squadron VF-713 sometime in the late 1940s, and called to active duty on 1 February 1951. It was redesignated as VF-152 on 4 February 1953, and finally as VA-152 on 1 August 1958. The squadron was disestablished on 29 January 1971, after twenty years of service.

== Operational history ==
- 15 October 1951: The squadron participated in its first combat operations in the Korean War.
- 31 December 1951: Squadron aircraft were used for Operation Pin Wheel. The aircraft were secured to the flight deck, with engines running, and the thrust provided by the aircraft was used to assist in the docking of USS Antietam.
- February 1955: Squadron aircraft flew night surveillance operations supporting the evacuation of Chinese Nationalists from the Tachen Islands during the First Taiwan Straits Crisis.
- March 1958: Due to revolts and unsettled conditions in Indonesia and the concern for the safety of Americans in the country, USS Hornet, with VF-152 embarked, departed Hong Kong to operate in the South China Sea.
- September–October 1958: During the Second Taiwan Straits Crisis, USS Bennington, with VF-152 embarked, operated in the area of Taiwan.
- January 1961: Due to the crisis in Laos and the capture of strategic positions in the country by the Pathet Lao force, USS Coral Sea, with VA-152 embarked, was directed to operate in the South China Sea.
- 11–12 July 1962: The squadron participated in the first carrier flight operations in the Bering Sea since the end of World War II.
- April–December 1964: Squadron personnel, while based at Bien Hoa Air Base, South Vietnam, trained South Vietnamese pilots to fly the A-1.
- 6 and 7 November 1965: Commander Gordon H. Smith was awarded the Silver Star for his participation as Flight Leader in directing and assisting in the first night rescue of a downed aviator in enemy territory on 6 November. This was followed by an attempt to rescue another aviator the following day in the same area.
- 7 November 1965: Lieutenant Gordon C. Wileen was awarded the Silver Star for his participation in an attempted air rescue of a downed aviator deep in enemy territory.
- 13 November 1965: Commander Albert E. Knutson was awarded the Silver Star for his attempt to locate and rescue a downed pilot in enemy territory. During the rescue attempt his aircraft sustained 26 hits.
- 26 October 1966: While on Yankee Station and preparing to launch her first strike of the day, USS Oriskany suffered a disastrous fire. The squadron lost two personnel in the fire and the damage to the carrier was so extensive that it returned to the States for repairs.
- 16 June 1967 – 31 January 1968: VA-152 is the second-to-last US Navy attack squadron to fly the single-seat A-1H/J Skyraider in combat, as part of Carrier Air Wing 16 (embarked aboard the Oriskany), during the squadron's and carrier's third combat cruise to Southeast Asia. VA-152 loses one aircraft and its pilot during this last A-1 cruise, on 15 July 1967. (VA-25 is the very last USN squadron to fly the A-1H/J in combat, completing its third and final combat cruise in early April 1968, aboard the Coral Sea).

== Home port assignments ==
The squadron was assigned to these home ports, effective on the dates shown:

- NAS Denver – Assigned prior to 1951. Exact date unknown.
- NAS Alameda – 11 Apr 1951
- NAS Moffett Field – 5 Jun 1952
- NAS Alameda – Nov 1963

== Aircraft assignment ==
The squadron first received the following aircraft on the dates shown:

- F4U-4 Corsair – 16 Apr 1951
- FG-1D Corsair – 12 Jun 1952
- F2H-3 Banshee – 3 Oct 1953
- AD-6/AD-1H Skyraider – 5 Feb 1959
- A-1J Skyraider – Dec 1962
- A-4B Skyhawk – Feb 1968
- A-4C Skyhawk – Feb 1968
- A-4E Skyhawk – May 1969

== See also ==
- List of squadrons in the Dictionary of American Naval Aviation Squadrons
- Attack aircraft
- List of inactive United States Navy aircraft squadrons
- History of the United States Navy
