= USS Tarawa (CV-40) =

Essex-class aircraft carrier of the US Navy

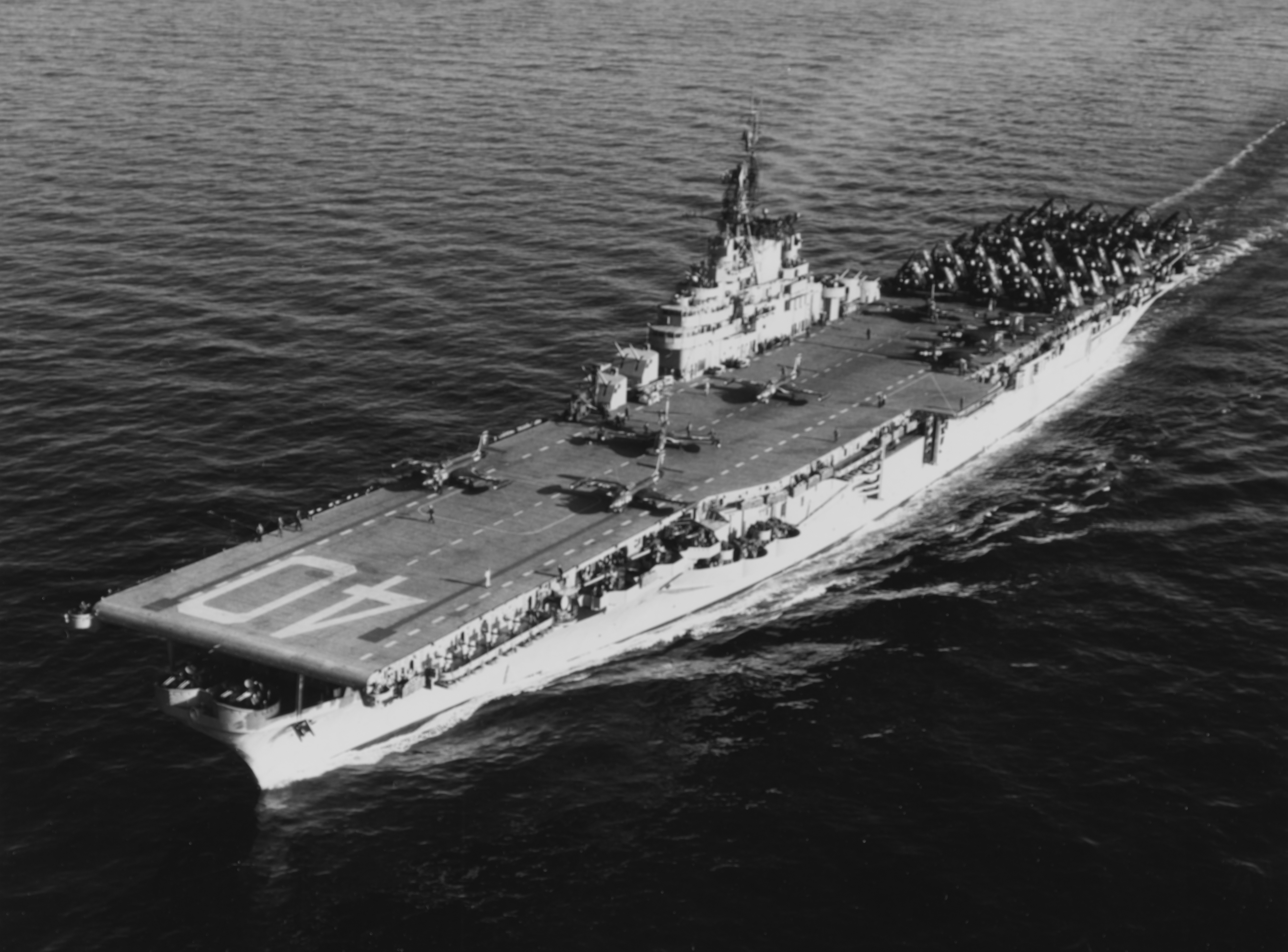
- USS Tarawa underway in December 1952

History

United States
- Name: Tarawa
- Namesake: Battle of Tarawa
- Builder: Norfolk Naval Shipyard
- Laid down: 1 March 1944
- Launched: 12 May 1945
- Commissioned: 8 December 1945
- Decommissioned: 30 June 1949
- Recommissioned: 3 February 1951
- Decommissioned: 13 May 1960
- Reclassified: CVA-40, 1 October 1952; CVS-40, 10 January 1955; AVT-12, May 1961
- Stricken: 1 June 1967
- Fate: Scrapped, 3 October 1968

General characteristics
- Class & type: Essex-class aircraft carrier
- Displacement: 27,100 long tons (27,500 t) standard
- Length: 888 feet (271 m) overall
- Beam: 93 feet (28 m)
- Draft: 28 feet 7 inches (8.71 m)
- Installed power: 8 × boilers; 150,000 shp (110 MW)
- Propulsion: 4 × geared steam turbines; 4 × shafts
- Speed: 33 knots (61 km/h; 38 mph)
- Complement: 3448 officers and enlisted
- Armament: 12 × 5 inch (127 mm)/38 caliber guns; 32 × Bofors 40 mm guns; 46 × Oerlikon 20 mm cannons
- Armor: Belt: 4 in (102 mm); Hangar deck: 2.5 in (64 mm); Deck: 1.5 in (38 mm); Conning tower: 1.5 inch
- Aircraft carried: 90–100 aircraft

USS Tarawa (CV/CVA/CVS-40, AVT-12) was one of 24 Essex-class aircraft carriers built during and shortly after World War II for the United States Navy. The ship was the first US Navy ship to bear the name, and was named for the bloody 1943 Battle of Tarawa. Tarawa was commissioned in December 1945, too late to serve in World War II. After serving a short time in the Far East, she was decommissioned in 1949. She was soon recommissioned after the Korean War began, serving in the Atlantic as a replacement for carriers sent to Korea. In the early 1950s, she was redesignated an attack carrier (CVA) and then an antisubmarine warfare carrier (CVS). Except for one tour in the Far East, she spent her entire second career operating in the Atlantic and Caribbean. Consequently, Tarawa was the only ship of her class to never see combat action.

Unlike many of her sisters, Tarawa received no major modernizations, and thus throughout her career retained the classic appearance of a World War II Essex-class ship. She was decommissioned in 1960, and while in reserve was redesignated an aircraft transport (AVT). She was sold for scrap in 1968.

== Construction and commissioning ==
Tarawa was 888 ft (270.7 m) long, had a beam of 93 ft (28.3 m), an extreme width of 147 ft 6 in (45.0 m), and a draft of 28 ft 7 in (8.7 m). She had a top speed of 32.7 kn (60.6 km/h; 37.6 mph), displaced 27,100 t (26,672.0 long tons; 29,872.6 short tons), and a complement of 3,448 men. She was armed with twelve 5 in (127.0 mm) guns, and seventy-two 40 mm (1.6 in).

Tarawa was one of the "long-hull" Essex-class ships. She was laid down on 11 March 1944 at the Norfolk Naval Shipyard, Portsmouth, Virginia. She was launched 12 May 1945, sponsored by Mrs. Julian C. Smith (the wife of Lieutenant General Julian C. Smith, USMC, who commanded the 2nd Marine Division at Tarawa). She was commissioned on 8 December 1945, with Captain Alvin Ingersoll Malstrom in command.

== Service history ==
=== Early service ===
Tarawa remained in the Norfolk area until 15 February 1946, when she sailed for shakedown training in the vicinity of Guantanamo Bay Naval Base, Cuba, and returned briefly to Norfolk on 16 April, before visiting New York in the latter part of the month. She arrived at Norfolk once again on 30 April. From then until late June, the warship completed her post-shakedown overhaul. On 28 June, she exited Hampton Roads bound for the west coast. Tarawa transited the Panama Canal early in July and reached San Diego, California on 15 July.

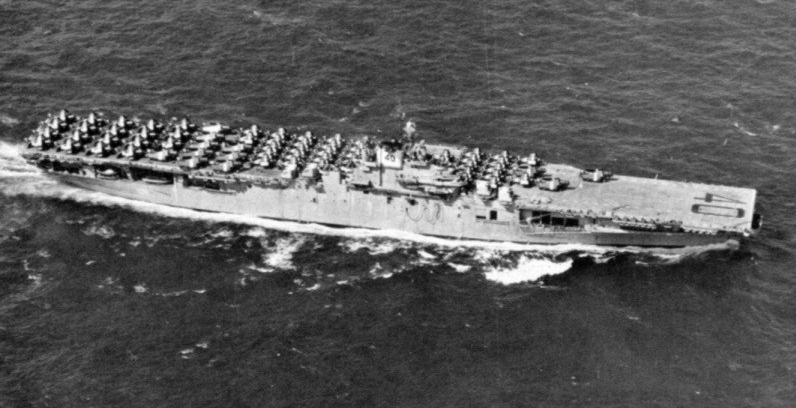
Tarawa in 1946

Following training and upkeep, she left San Diego for a deployment to the western Pacific. The aircraft carrier reached Pearl Harbor on 7 August and soon thereafter continued on her voyage west. She reached Saipan on 20 August and operated in the vicinity of the Mariana Islands until late September when she headed for Japan. After a stop at Yokosuka from 28 September – 3 October and one at Sasebo from 7–11 October, the aircraft carrier got underway for the northern coast of China. She arrived in the vicinity of Tsingtao on 15 October and operated in that area until 30 October when she headed back to the Marianas. On 7 November, the carrier reached Saipan and, for the remainder of her Far Eastern tour, conducted operations in the Marianas. The only exception was a brief voyage to Okinawa and back early in January 1947, after which she departed Guam on 14 January to return to Pearl Harbor. The warship arrived in Pearl Harbor on 24 January and remained in Hawaiian waters until 18 February when she got underway for fleet exercises in the vicinity of Kwajalein. As a unit of Task Force 57 (TF 57), she participated in battle practice attacks upon the carriers of TF 38 until early March. Tarawa returned to Pearl Harbor on 11 March for about a month, then headed for the west coast and arrived in San Francisco on 29 April.

After more than 16 months of air operations out of San Francisco and San Diego, Tarawa stood out of San Diego on 28 September 1948 and embarked upon a cruise most of the way around the world. She stopped at Pearl Harbor at the end of the second week in October and then continued her voyage on to her first foreign port of call, Tsingtao, China. The carrier arrived there on 29 October and spent the next five weeks observing events in strife-torn northern China. Early in December, she headed south for liberty calls at Hong Kong and Singapore. The warship departed the latter port on 23 December and headed for the newly independent Republic of Ceylon, and arrived at its capital, Colombo, on 29 December. Departing Ceylon on 2 January 1949, she steamed toward the Persian Gulf to call at Bahrain and Jeddah before transiting the Suez Canal on 20–21 January. Leaving Port Said, Tarawa continued her voyage to Greece, Turkey, and Crete. From Souda Bay, Crete, the warship headed across the Mediterranean on 8 February. She stopped overnight at Gibraltar on 12–13 February and then started out across the Atlantic. On 21 February, she ended her voyage at Norfolk. From then until early summer, the carrier conducted normal operations along the east coast and in the Caribbean area. After inactivation overhaul, Tarawa was placed out of commission on 30 June 1949 and was berthed with the New York Group, Atlantic Reserve Fleet.

=== Recommissioning ===
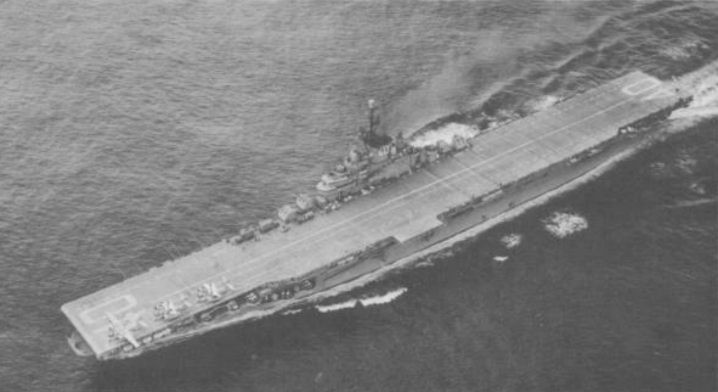
Tarawa during Operation Argus in 1958

Her retirement, however, lasted less than 18 months. On 30 November 1950, she was ordered reactivated in response to the Navy's urgent need for warships – particularly for aircraft carriers – to prosecute the war which had erupted in Korea the previous summer. On 3 February 1951, Tarawa was recommissioned at Newport, Rhode Island, Captain J. H. Griffin in command. Though reactivated in response to the Korean War, Tarawa never saw service in that conflict. Rather, she served as a replacement in the 6th and 2nd Fleets for carriers dispatched to the war zone. On 1 October 1952, she became an attack aircraft carrier, and was redesignated CVA-40. The warship finally made it to the Asiatic war zone in the spring of 1954, but long after the July 1953 armistice had ended hostilities.

The ship returned to the east coast in September 1954 and resumed her normal operations. In December, she entered the Boston Naval Shipyard for overhaul and conversion to an antisubmarine warfare (ASW) aircraft carrier. On 10 January 1955, while still undergoing conversion, she was redesignated CVS-40. Her alterations were completed that summer and, after shakedown, the carrier operated around Quonset Point, Rhode Island, conducting training missions with the ASW air squadrons based there. That fall, she participated in exercises with Hunter-Killer Group 4 before returning to Quonset Point to prepare for the 1956 Springboard exercise. 30 September 1957 she visited Rotterdam.

In August and September 1958, Tarawa was part of Navy Task Force 88 (TF 88) during Operation Argus, which was involved in conducting nuclear tests in the very high atmosphere.

Tarawa served with the Atlantic Fleet for the remainder of her active career. She remained on the east coast, operating out of Quonset Point and Norfolk and occasionally visiting the Caribbean area for exercises. In the main, her duty consisted of barrier patrols against the increasingly large Soviet submarine and surface fleet and assignments training pilots for the Atlantic Fleet. On 1 May 1960, however, Tarawa's active career came to an end. She was decommissioned and placed in reserve at Philadelphia, where she remained until the late 1960s. During her retirement, she received one more change in designation when she became AVT-12 in May 1961. On 1 June 1967, her name was struck from the Naval Vessel Register, and on 3 October 1968, she was sold to the Boston Metals Corporation, Baltimore, Maryland for scrapping.

== Awards ==

China Service Medal (extended)		American Campaign Medal
World War II Victory Medal	Navy Occupation Medal (with Asia and Europe clasps)	National Defense Service Medal
Korean Service Medal	United Nations Korean Medal	Republic of Korea War Service Medal (retroactive)

== Gallery ==
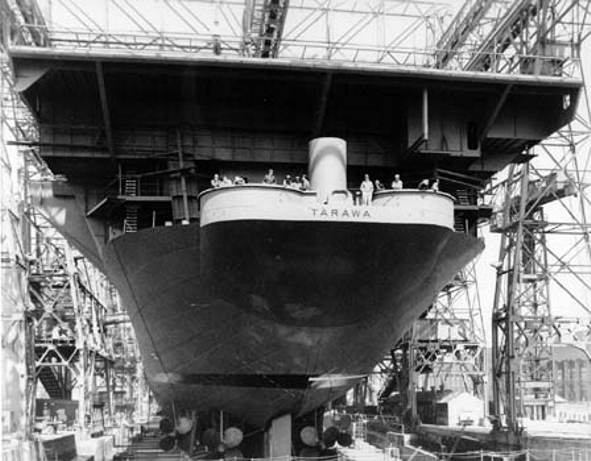
Tarawa under construction at Norfolk Navy Yard in 1945

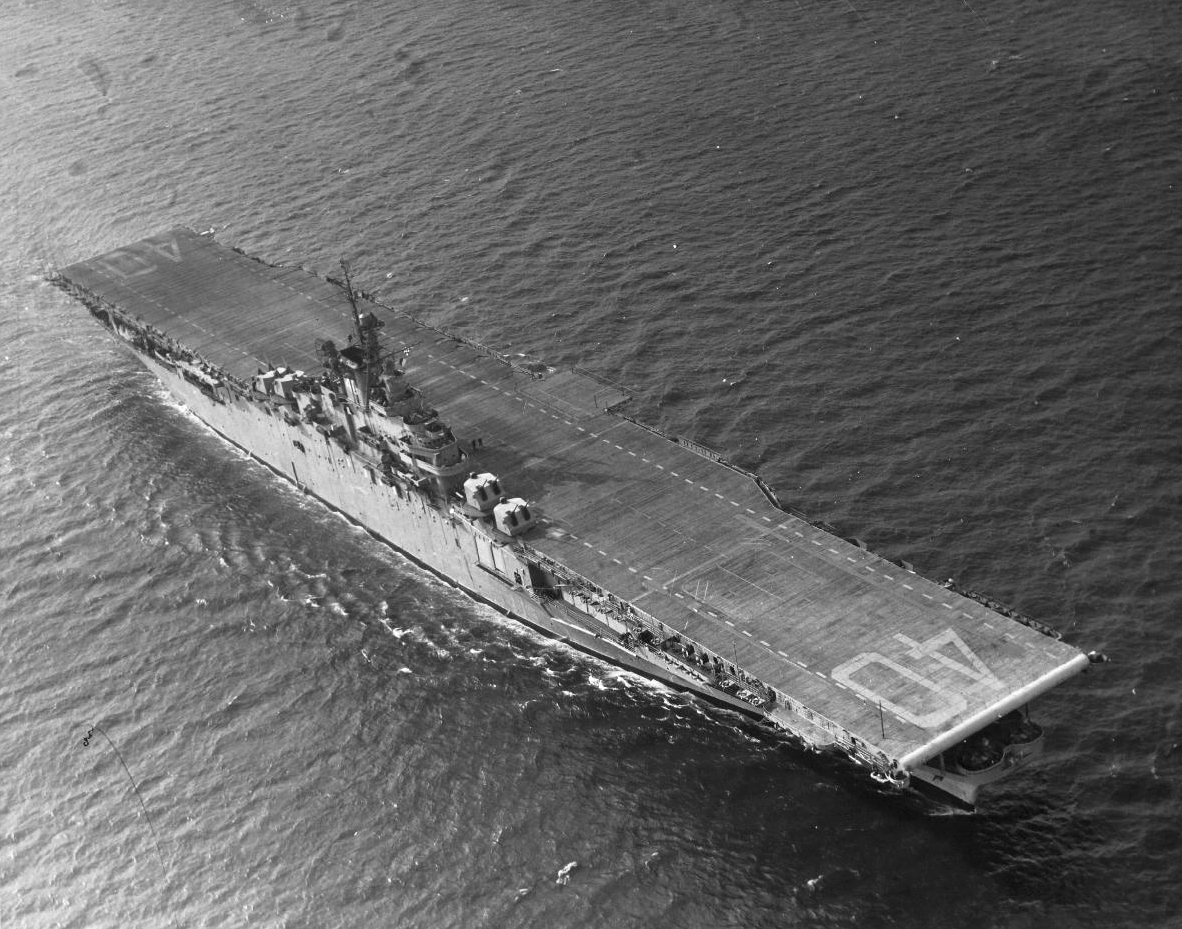
Tarawa underway at sea, 1948

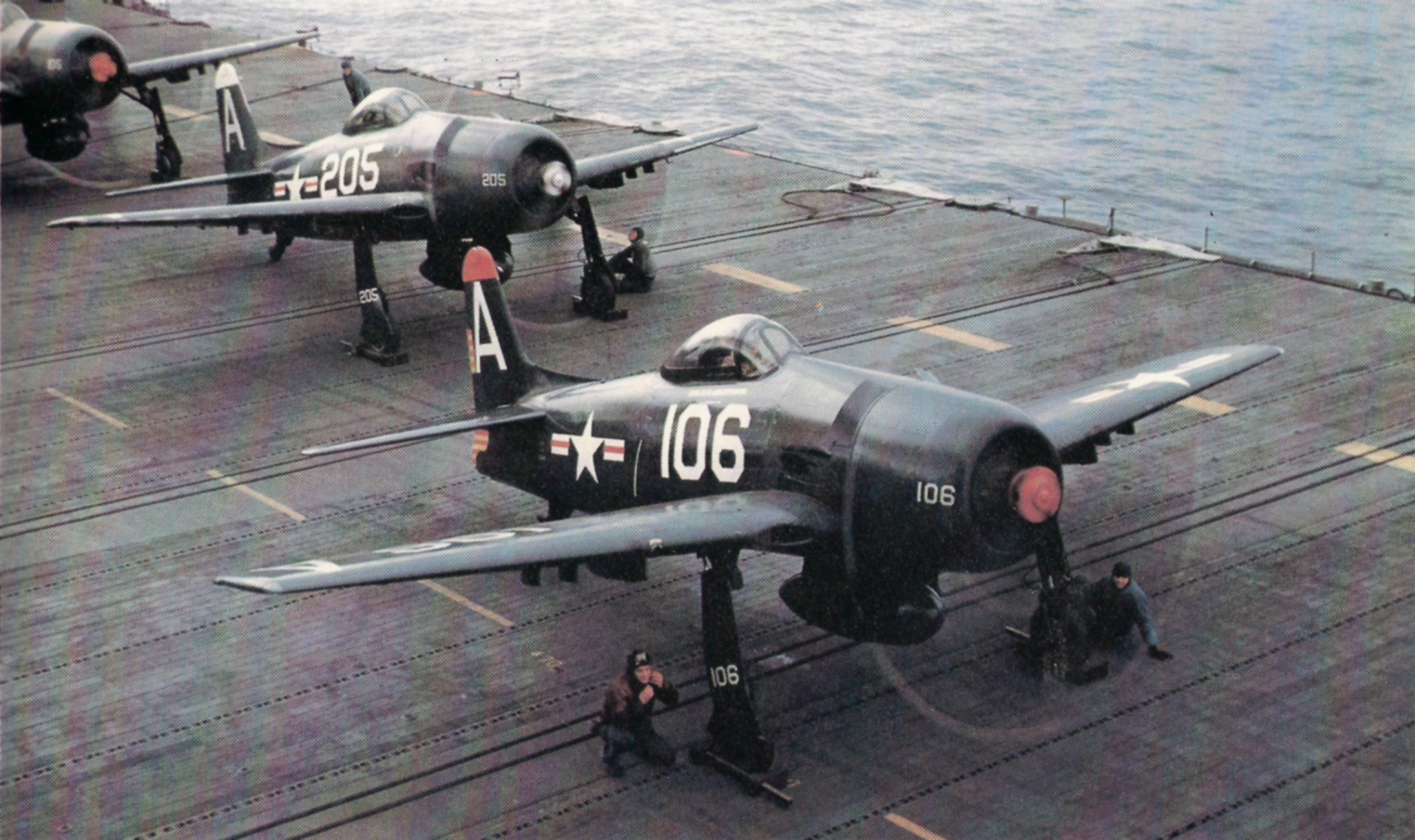
F8F Bearcats on Tarawa in 1948

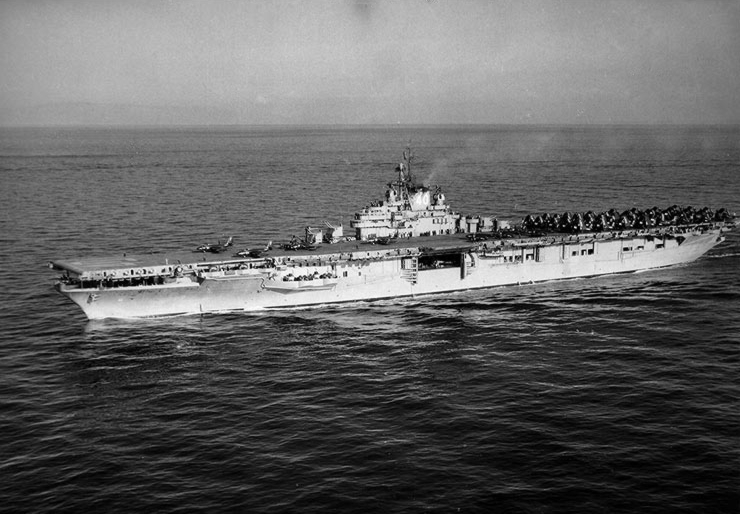
Tarawa underway on 18 December 1952

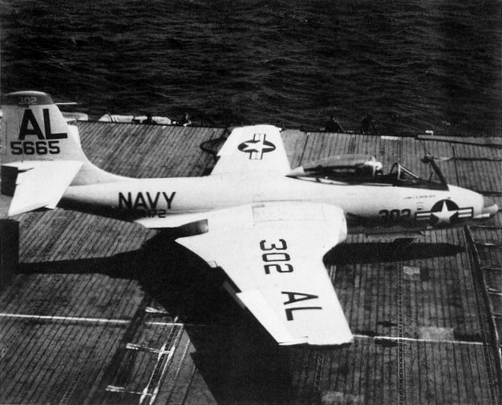
F2H-2 of VA-172 on Tarawa in 1957

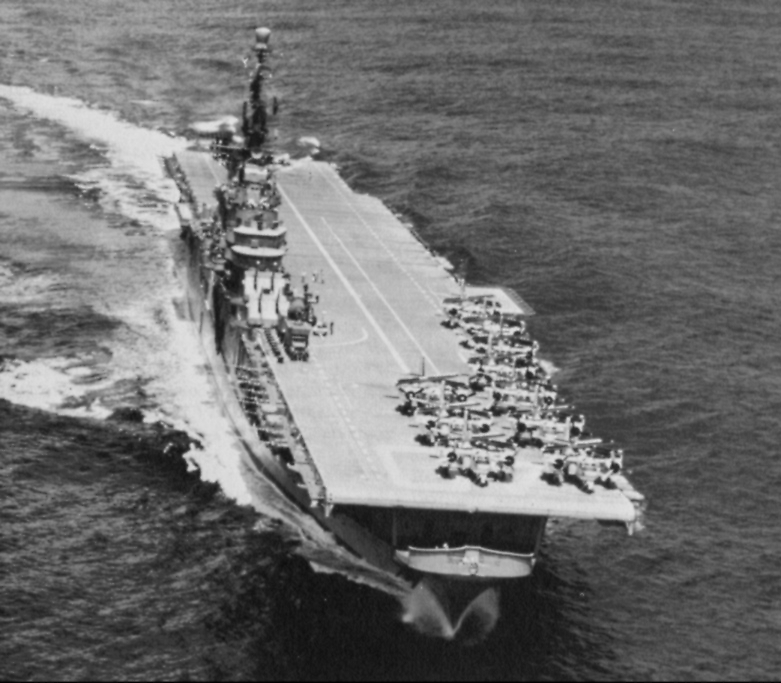
Tarawa in 1958

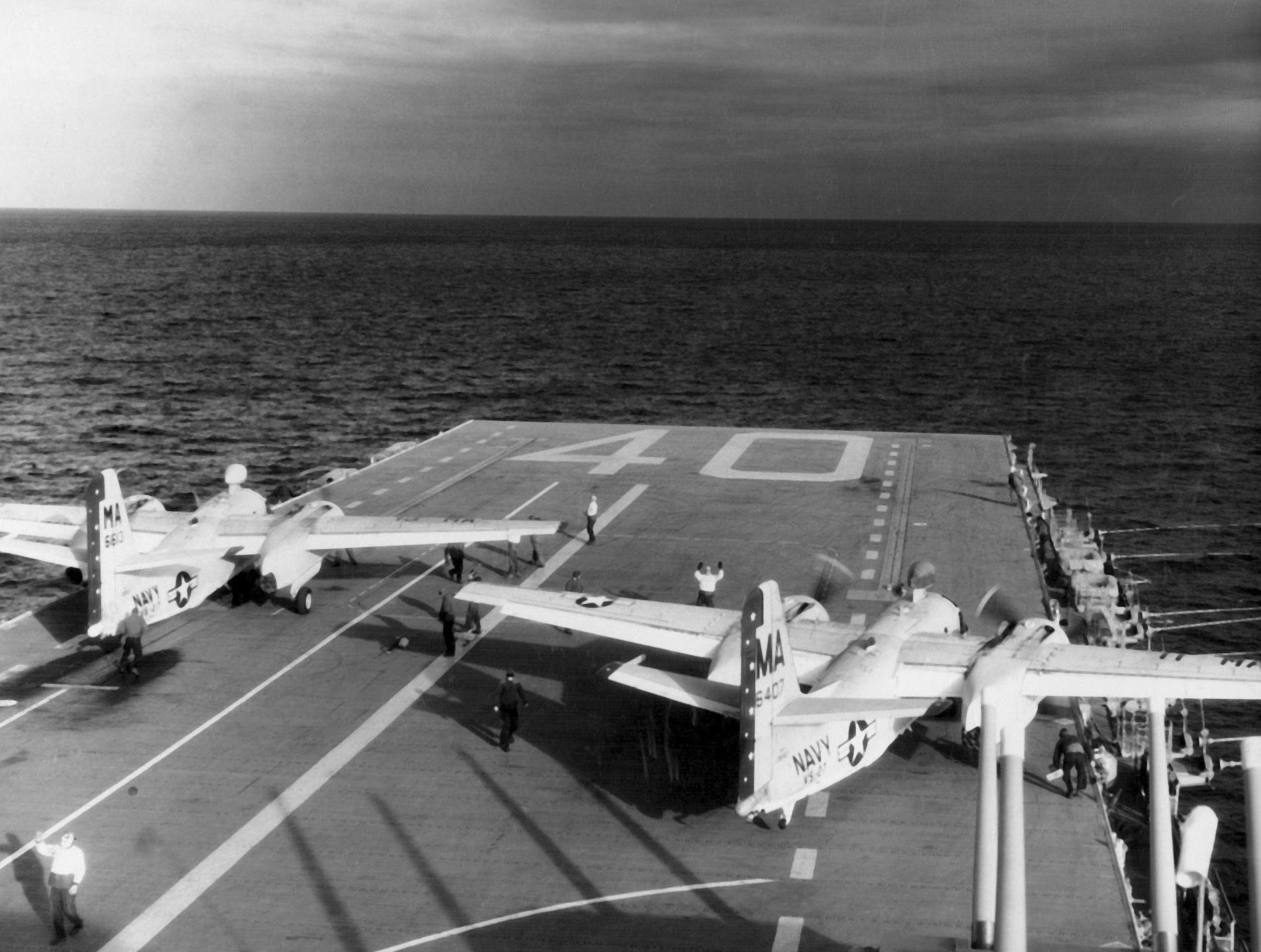
S2F-1 Trackers of VS-27 launching from Tarawa in 1959

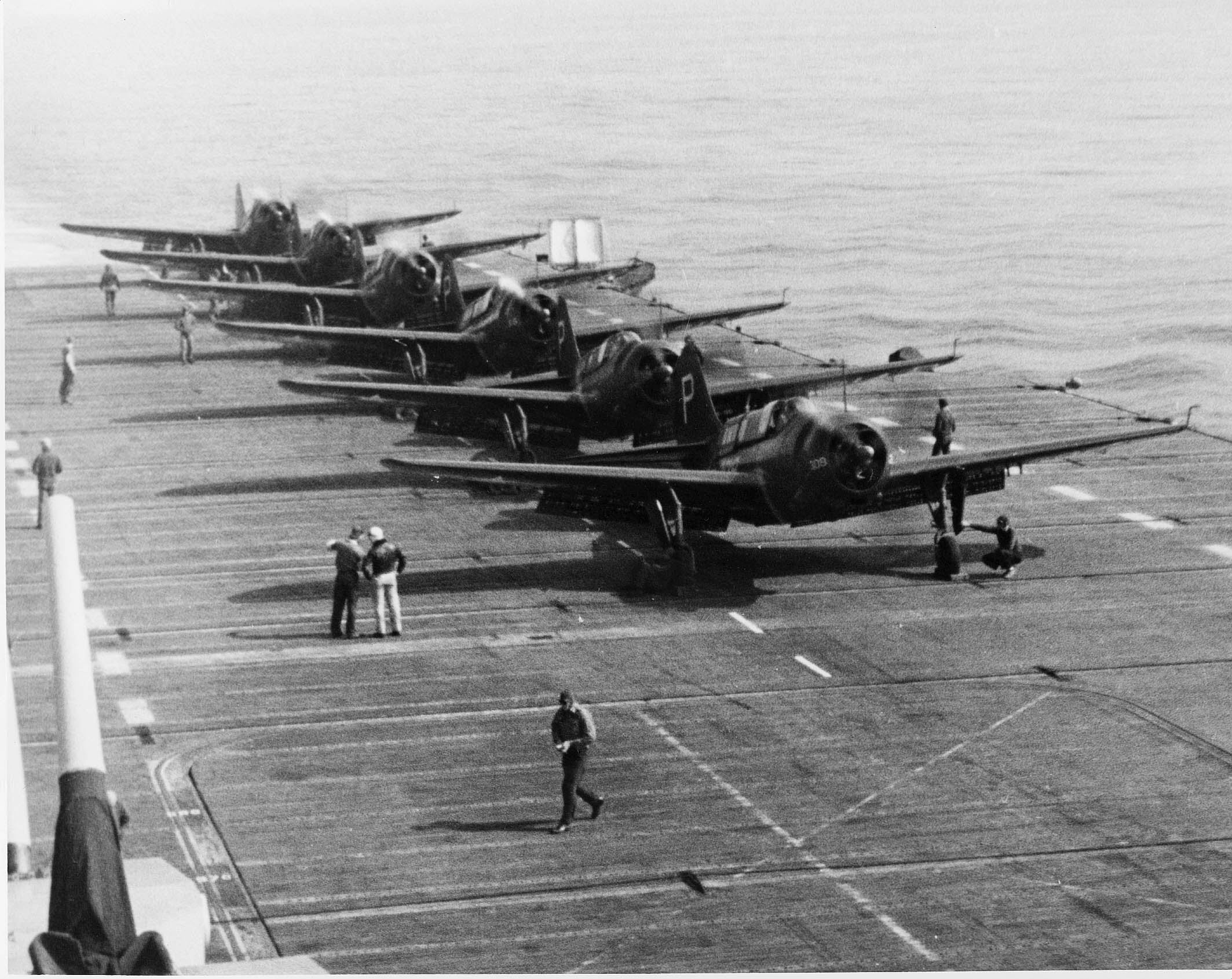

== See also ==
- List of aircraft carriers
