= McDonnell F2H Banshee =

American carrier-based jet fighter

F2H Banshee
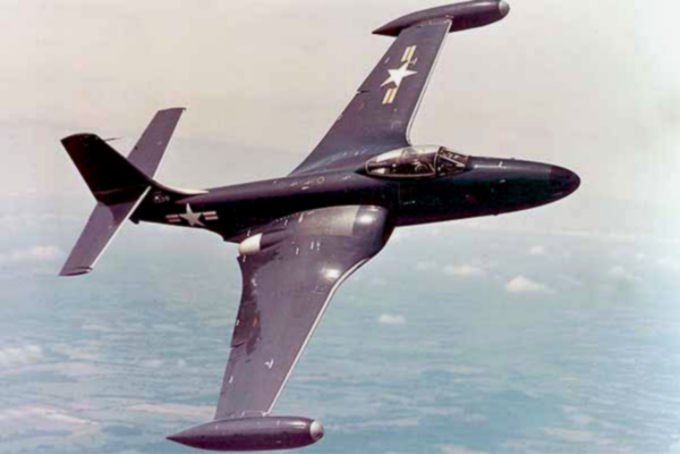

General information
- Type: Carrier-based fighter aircraft
- National origin: United States
- Manufacturer: McDonnell Aircraft
- Primary users: United States Navy United States Marine Corps; Royal Canadian Navy
- Number built: 895

History
- Manufactured: 1947 to 1953
- Introduction date: August 1948
- First flight: 11 January 1947
- Retired: 30 September 1959 USN; 1959 USMC; 1960 USN, USMC (F2H-2P); 1961 USNR, USMCR; 12 September 1962 RCN
- Developed from: McDonnell FH Phantom

The McDonnell F2H Banshee (company designation McDonnell Model 24) is a single-seat carrier-based jet fighter aircraft designed and produced by the American aircraft manufacturer McDonnell Aircraft. It was an early jet fighter operated by United States Navy and United States Marine Corps, as well as being the only jet-powered fighter to ever be deployed by the Royal Canadian Navy. The aircraft's name is derived from the banshee of Irish mythology.

The Banshee was developed during the mid to late 1940s. It was a derivative of the earlier FH Phantom, although the resulting aircraft would be considerably larger, more heavily armed, and furnished with far more powerful engines in the form of a pair of Westinghouse J34 turbojets. The Banshee incorporated several recent innovations, including a pressurized cockpit, "kneeling" nose landing gear and an ejection seat, which the Phantom lacked, as well as a large number of improvements to other aircraft systems. On 11 January 1947, the first prototype performed its maiden flight. During August 1948, the first F2H-1, the initial production model, was completed. The F2H-2 was the basis for three sub-variants; the nuclear-armed F2H-2B, the F2H-2N night fighter, and the F2H-2P photo reconnaissance aircraft.

Upon its introduction in late 1948, the Banshee proved to be almost 100 mph (160 km/h) slower than the latest land-based fighters, which has been largely attributed to its use of a straight wing rather than a swept wing configuration. Nevertheless, several variants were procured; the F2H-2N was the first carrier-based jet-powered night fighter flown by the U.S. Navy, albeit only in limited numbers, while the F2H-2P was also the service's first jet-powered reconnaissance aircraft. US Navy and Marine pilots often referred to the F2H as the "Banjo". It was one of the primary American fighters used during the Korean War, typically being flown as an escort fighter and reconnaissance aircraft. Radar-equipped Banshees were also used for all-weather fleet defense. Furthermore, during 1955, 27 overflights of potential Chinese staging areas were conducted by USMC Banshees in response to a possible Chinese invasion of Taiwan.

During the mid 1950s, the U.S. Navy and USMC began retiring their Banshees in favour of newer and more capable jet aircraft, such as the swept wing Grumman F-9 Cougar and McDonnell F3H Demon, and the delta wing Douglas F4D Skyray. Several of these aircraft would be acquired by Canada for the Royal Canadian Navy as production of the Banshee was terminated in 1953. Introduced to Canadian service in 1955, the type became the sole fighter operated following the retirement of the piston-engined Hawker Sea Fury. It operated at sea from HMCS Bonaventure or from shore bases as NORAD interceptor aircraft. Amid a reorientation towards anti-submarine warfare (ASW) and reduced value being placed on fighter operations, as well as decreasing reliability, Canada opted to withdraw its last Banshees without any direct replacement in September 1962.

== Design and development ==
=== Background ===
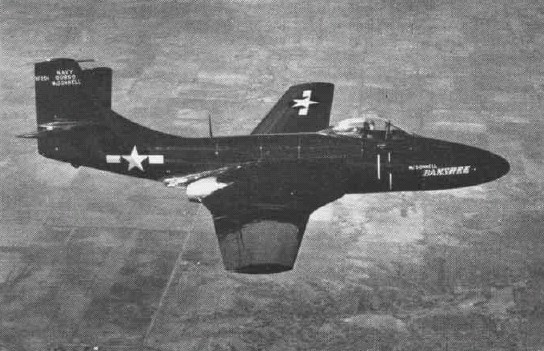
XF2D-1, later XF2H-1 in 1947

The origins of the Banshee can be traced back to the FH Phantom, the United States Navy's first carrier-based jet fighter. This predecessor had been first proposed by McDonnell in January 1943 and made its first flight on 2 January 1945. Even prior to production-standard Phantoms commencing delivery in January 1947, the company had already progressed with development of a successor. On 2 March 1945, the U.S. Navy's Bureau of Aeronautics instructed McDonnell to produce three prototypes of the improved derivative they had envisioned, designated XF2D-1. The company's design team had originally intended for this aircraft to be a straightforward modification of the Phantom and thus to share many components between the two aircraft, but it promptly became clear that the new aircraft ought to possess heavier armament, greater internal fuel capacity, and several other improvements that made the original concept infeasible.

The resulting aircraft required the use of much larger and more powerful engines; the powerplant selected was a pair of newly developed Westinghouse J34 turbojets, which provided nearly double the total thrust from 3,200 to 6,000 lbf (14,000 to 27,000 N) compared to the Phantom but, since the larger engines still had to fit within the wing roots, this required a larger and thicker wing. The more powerful engines were more fuel hungry, thus the fuselage was enlarged and strengthened to facilitate an increase in fuel capacity, which permitted a mission radius of up to 600 miles to be flown. No provisions for external stores were present on early production aircraft.

"The Banshee"" (1950) Official McDonnell aircraft corporation promotional film reel.

Armament comprised four 20 mm (0.79 in) cannon, the U.S. Navy's successor to the obsolete World War II-era .50 in (12.7 mm) machine guns; these were mounted underneath the redesigned nose as this positioning meant that pilots would not be blinded by muzzle flash when firing at night, which had been a problem with the Phantom. From the tenth production aircraft onwards, the Banshee incorporated an ejection seat, another feature that had been absent on the Phantom. The aircraft also incorporated a large number of improvements to various onboard systems. The cockpit was pressurized and air conditioned, while the flaps, landing gear, folding wings, canopy, and air brakes were electrically rather than pneumatically operated. The front of the windscreen was bulletproof glass that was electrically heated to prevent frost.

The Banshee was provisioned with a "kneeling" nose landing gear that had a pair of small wheels forward of the regular nosewheel. The regular nosewheel could be retracted so that the aircraft would rest on the smaller wheels; it could taxi with its nose down, redirecting the hot jet blast upwards to pose less risk to ground crews, and to allow parked aircraft to be tucked under each other to save space. This function was usually removed from later variants as it was found to be of little practical use and caused deck handling problems. During April 1945, a mockup was completed. The project survived the numerous cancellations that came around the end of the conflict, however, the pace of development was slowed considerably, leading to the first of three prototypes not being completed until late 1946.

=== Into flight ===
On 11 January 1947, the first prototype performed its maiden flight from Lambert Field, St. Louis, Missouri, piloted by McDonnell test pilot Robert M. Eldholm. During this first test flight, the aircraft demonstrated a climb rate of 9,000 ft/min (2,700 m/min), twice that of the F8F Bearcat, the Navy's primary fleet defense interceptor. The flight test programme, which included carrier trials, was considered to be a success, however, various improvements and refinements to the aircraft were suggested. The U.S. Navy also permitted McDonnell to borrow one of the prototypes to assist in the development of afterburners and to test fly a modified wing design with an extended trailing edge.

During 1947, the prototype was redesignated XF2H-1 after the Navy placed an order for an unrelated jet fighter from the Douglas Aircraft Company, which had previously been assigned the manufacturer's letter D. An initial order for 56 aircraft was issued by the U.S. Navy on 29 May 1947. During August 1949, an F2H-1 set a US Navy jet fighter altitude record of 52,000 ft (16,000 m), but it wasn't enough to beat the 59,430 ft (18,110 m) reached by a de Havilland Vampire on 23 March 1948. This altitude record was motivated at least partially by inter-service rivalries, as the feat proved that the Convair B-36 Peacemaker strategic bombers of the United States Air Force (the existence of which had been a factor in the cancellation of the USS United States, which would have been the U.S. Navy's first "supercarrier") was vulnerable to interceptor aircraft even at its maximum altitude.

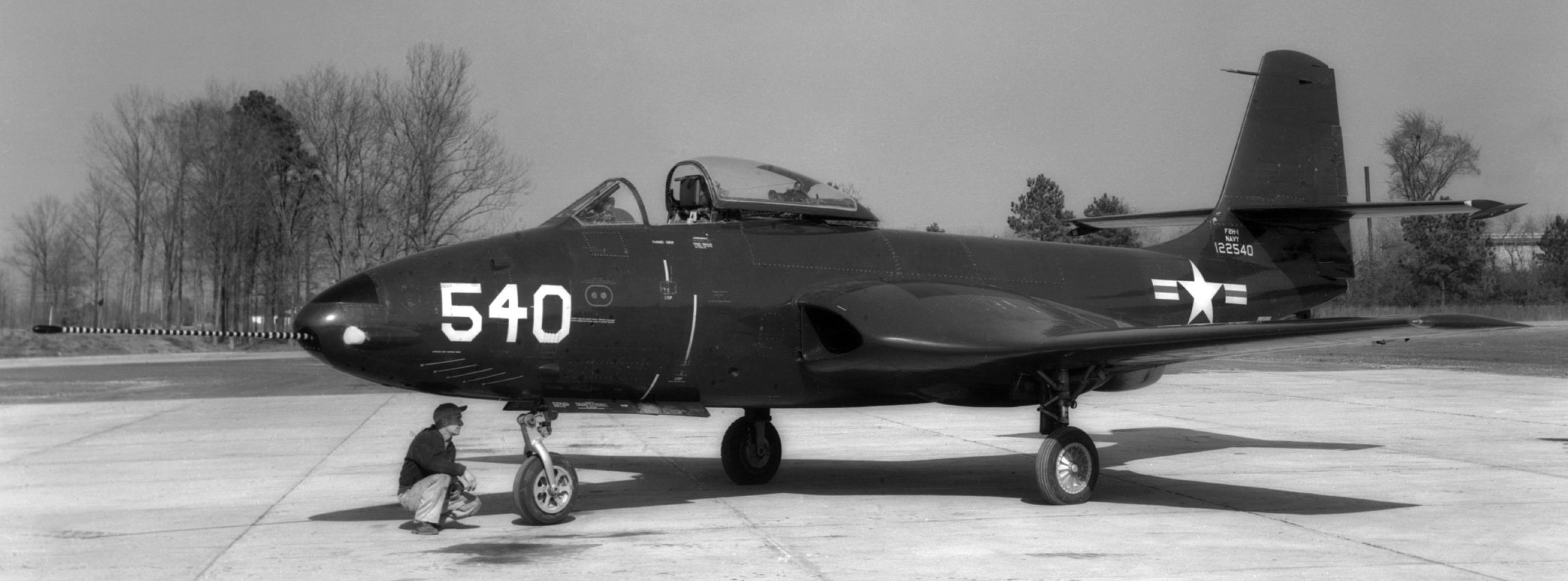
F2H-1 early in its career while still undergoing testing

During August 1948, similarities to the FH-1 meant that McDonnell was able to complete the first F2H-1, a mere three months after the last FH-1 was built; service evaluations commenced that same month Compared to the XF2D-1, the F2H was a larger aircraft in practically all aspects, while the fuel capacity was increased to 877 US gal (3,320 L; 730 imp gal). The empennage was a new design, the dorsal fin was reduced, and the dihedral was eliminated from the horizontal stabilizers. The wing and tail were reduced in thickness to increase the critical Mach number and different airfoil sections were used. The F2H-1 was retrofitted with 3,150 lbf (14,000 N) engines as they became available.

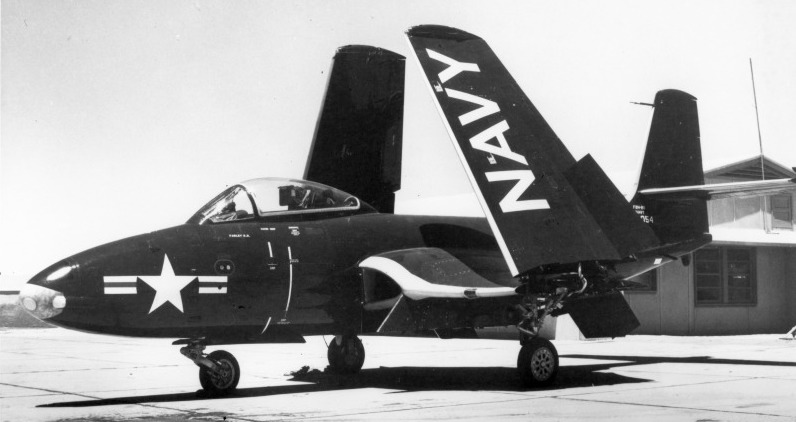
F2H-2B with extra pylon near intake for carrying a nuclear bomb

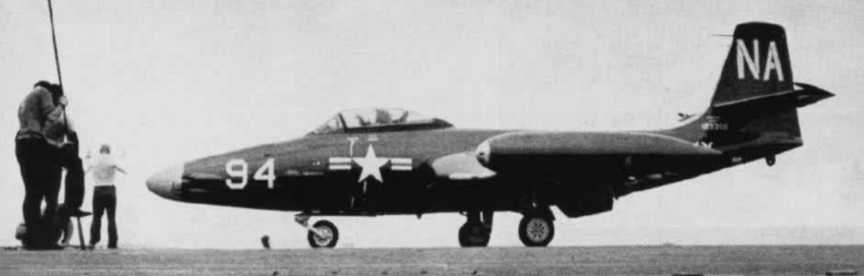
F2H-2N night fighter

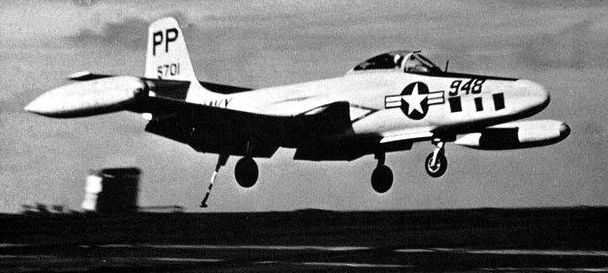
F2H-2P with extended camera nose, post-1955

Although the Navy was satisfied with the F2H-1, it was the more capable F2H-2 that was most widely used. Powered by Westinghouse J34-WE-34 engines, capable of producing 3,250 lbf (14,500 N) of thrust, it proved to be capable of significantly improved performance. The wings were strengthened to add provision for 200 US gal (760 L; 170 imp gal) wingtip fuel tanks but, unlike those of the contemporary Grumman F9F Panther, the Banshee's wingtip tanks were detachable. A pair of armament pylons were added under each inboard and outboard wing, for a total of eight, allowing the aircraft to carry 1,580 lb (720 kg) of stores, consisting of up to four 250 lb (110 kg) bombs and four 5 in (130 mm) unguided rockets. The "kneeling" nose gear was omitted from the F2H-2 and most subsequent Banshee variants.

=== Further development ===
The F2H-2 was the basis for three sub-variants. The F2H-2B had strengthened wings and an additional pylon adjacent to the intake on the port side to allow it to carry a 1,650 lb (750 kg) Mark 7 nuclear bomb or a 3,230 lb (1,470 kg) Mark 8 nuclear bomb. To compensate for the increased load, the F2H-2B was fitted with stiffer landing gear struts and a pilot-switchable aileron power boost. The latter was necessary to control the roll to the left when a heavy nuclear bomb was carried. One cannon was removed to provide room for the electronics needed to arm the weapon. 25 F2H-2Bs were built.

The F2H-2N was the U.S. Navy's first carrier-based jet night fighter, making its first flight on 3 February 1950, although only 14 would be built. It had a 2 ft 10 in (0.86 m) longer nose that housed a Sperry Corporation AN/APS-19 radar which required that the cannons be moved back to make room. An F2H-2N was returned to McDonnell to serve as the prototype for the enlarged F2H-3. Some F2H-2Ns retained the "kneeling" nose feature of the earlier F2H-1.

The F2H-2P photo reconnaissance version had six cameras in a 2 ft 5 in (0.74 m) longer nose and was the US Navy's first jet-powered carrier-based reconnaissance aircraft. First flight was on 12 October 1950, and 90 were built. The pilot could rotate the cameras in both vertical and horizontal planes, and the aircraft could carry a pair of underwing pods that each contained 20 flash cartridges for night photography. The camera bay was electrically heated. The F2H-2P was a valuable photo-reconnaissance asset due to its long range for a jet aircraft, high ceiling of 48,500 ft (14,800 m), and speed that made it difficult to intercept even by other jet aircraft. As a result, the F2H-2P was responsible for supplying roughly 40% of the United States Air Force (USAF) Fifth Air Force's daytime reconnaissance needs.

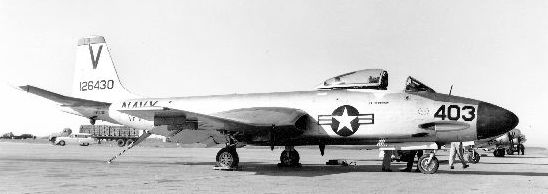
F2H-3 with larger radar and repositioned guns and tailplane

The F2H-3 was an all-weather fighter, with a larger diameter Westinghouse AN/APQ-41 radar fitted in an 8 ft 0 in (2.44 m) longer fuselage which also increased its internal fuel load by over 50%, to 1,102 US gal (4,170 L; 918 imp gal). This allowed the detachable wingtip fuel tanks to be reduced to 170 US gal (640 L; 140 imp gal) each, and due to the increased internal capacity, these were now seldom needed. The cannons were moved back, away from the nose to accommodate the larger diameter radar while allowing for an increased ammunition capacity. The horizontal stabilizers were lowered from the fin to the fuselage and were given dihedral, and on all but the first aircraft, large triangular fillets were added to the leading edges. The weapons load was increased to 3,000 lb (1,400 kg) and AIM-9 Sidewinder air-to-air missiles would be cleared for use. The F2H-3 also added provisions for aerial refueling consisting of as-needed bolt-on, in-flight refueling probe that replaced the upper port cannon. 250 were built, with the first flight being made on March 29 1952.

The final variant to be produced was the F2H-4. It had a Hughes AN/APG-37 radar and slightly more powerful Westinghouse J34-WE-38 3,600 lbf (16,000 N) engines that increased the aircraft's service ceiling to 56,000 ft (17,000 m). The F2H-4 was externally indistinguishable from the F2H-3.

McDonnell also created at least 48 proposals, including a long range escort fighter (Model 24H), a two-seat night fighter (Model 24N), a two-seat trainer (Model 24P), a two seat interceptor (Model 24Q), several single seat interceptors (models 24R & 24S), multiple variants with lengthened fuselages, alternate wings and tails, swept wings (model 24J, and others) and afterburners (model 24K, 24L and others), and various engine (model 24W, and others) and radar installations (model 24Y, and others), few of which were built. Plans for adding afterburners were canceled after a test aircraft suffered extensive damage to the wing and tail after the afterburners were lit. An F2H-3P reconnaissance variant was proposed to replace the F2H-2P, but was ultimately not built.

On 24 September 1953, production of the Banshee was ended following the delivery of 895 aircraft. Under the 1962 unified designation system surviving F2H-3 and F2H-4 were redesignated F-2C and F-2D respectively. The F-2A and F-2B designations were never assigned, as the F2H-1 and F2H-2 had already been retired. No Banshee flew under the new designations as the last examples were already in storage when the new designations came into effect.

== Operational history ==
=== US Navy and Marine Corps ===
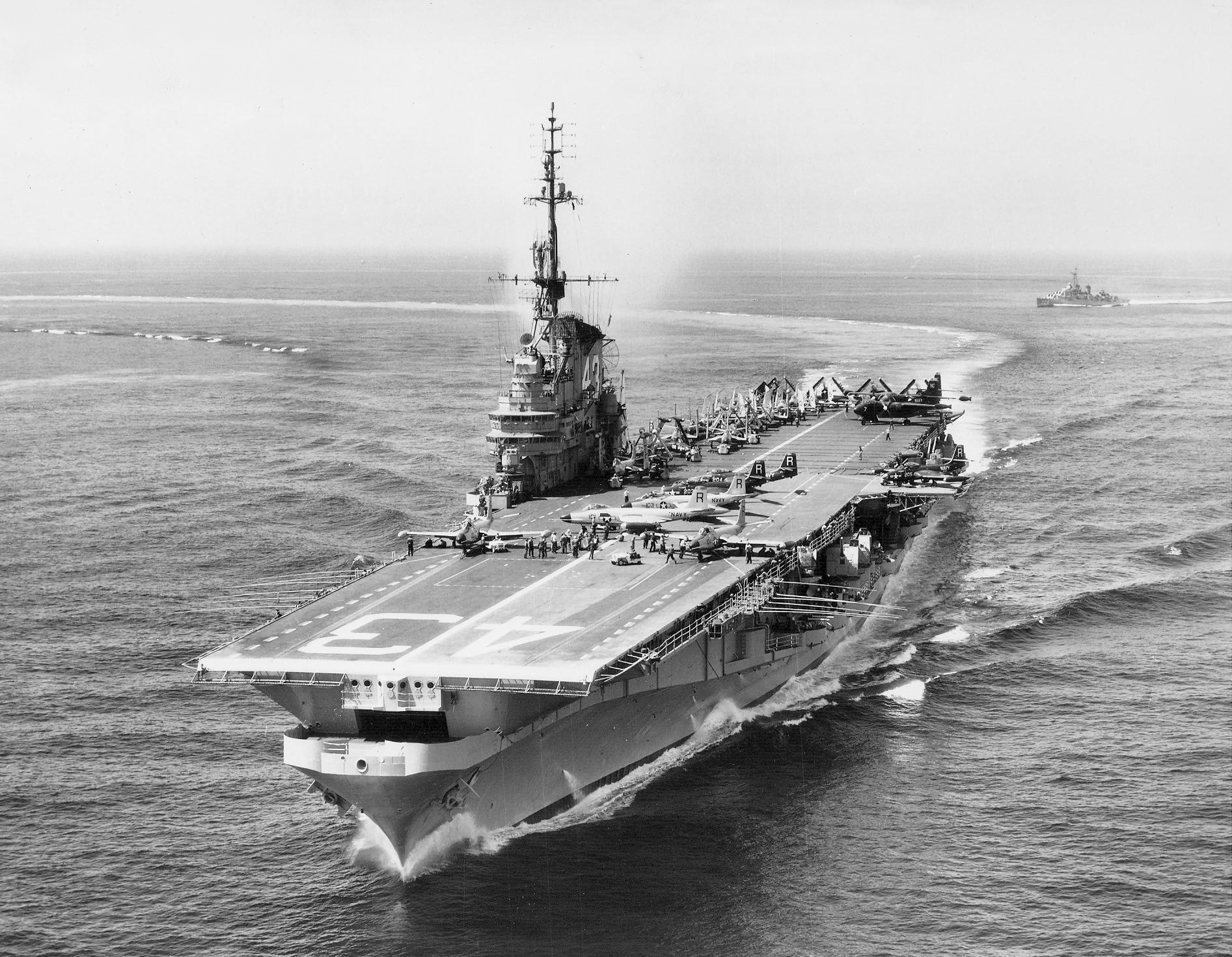
Banshees on USS Coral Sea in 1955

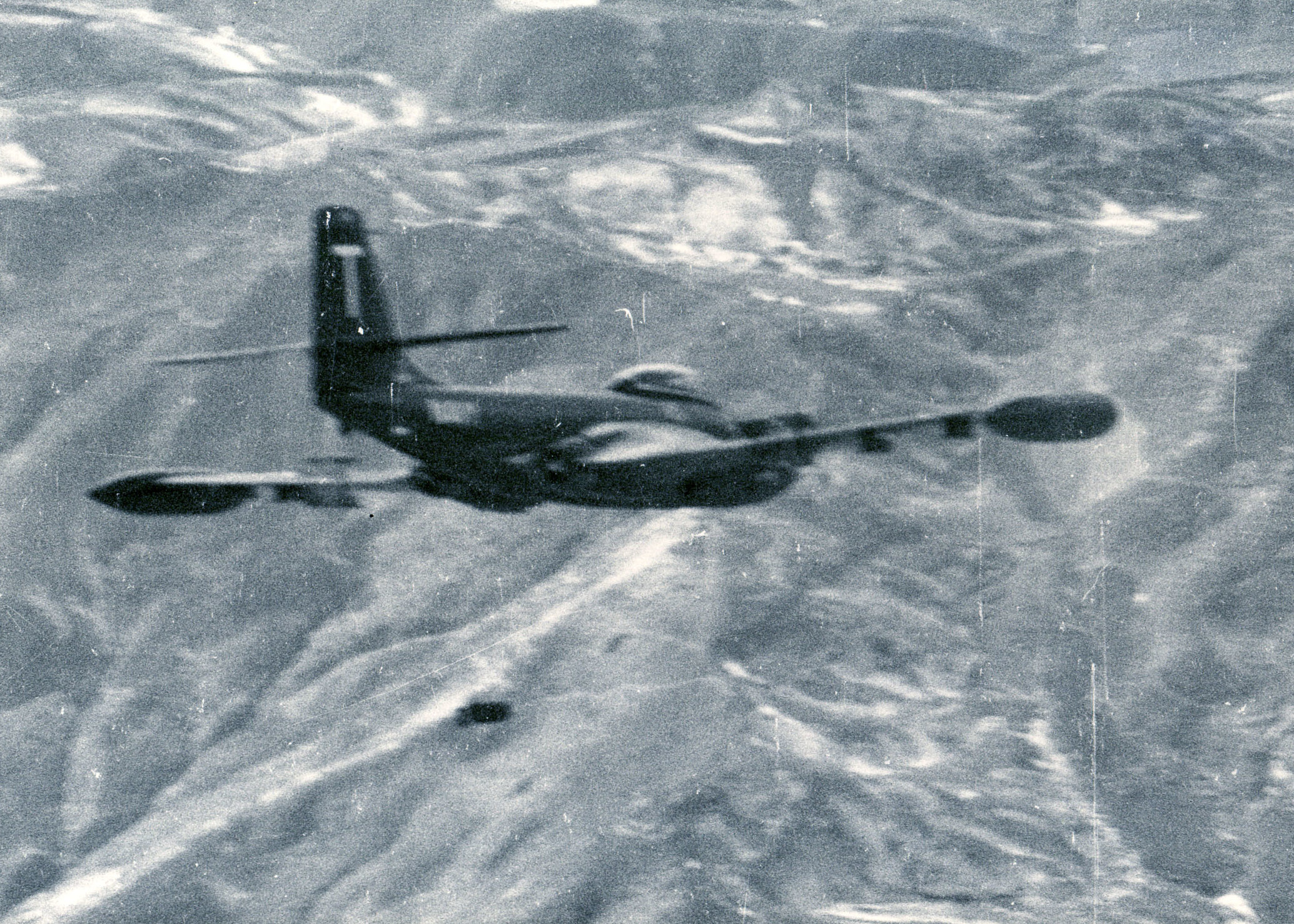
F2H making a bombing run over Korea

The F2H-2 served during the Korean War with the US Navy's Task Force 77 and the Marine Corps. On 23 August 1951, a Banshee flew the type's first combat mission in the Korean theatre from USS Essex. The F2H-2 initially proved its worth as an escort fighter for the USAF bombers supporting United Nations Command (UNC) ground forces, largely due to its favourable performance when flown at high altitude. The Banshee was able to demonstrate clear performance advantages over the Grumman F9F Panther.

From mid-1950, the F2H-2 had negligible exposure to hostile aircraft over Korea, due to several factors. During the opening weeks of the war, the North Korean air force had been almost completely annihilated by UNC fighter units. Later, North Korea and its allies were unable to operate from airfields near combat zones in South Korea, forcing them to operate out of air bases in China. As a result of their air superiority throughout most of 1950, UNC squadrons were able to carry out ground attack missions instead, especially close air support and interdiction of North Korean army supply lines.

The Banshee, like most naval jets of its generation, had a serious handicap. Naval air services, including the USN, had resisted faster, swept wing designs from fears that poor low speed flight characteristics made them unsafe to operate from aircraft carriers. Consequently, the Banshee was almost 100 mph (160 km/h) slower than the latest land-based fighters. Their obsolescence was reinforced by the introduction of the Mikoyan-Gurevich MiG-15 in November 1950. Most UNC air combat missions, such as patrols over "MiG Alley", were undertaken by North American F-86 Sabres of the USAF Far East Air Forces. Consequently, F2H fighters operated most of the war beyond the range of enemy fighters. Banshee pilots scored no victories, while three F2H-2s were lost to anti-aircraft gunfire.

The F2H-2P flew reconnaissance missions during the Korean War, primarily with the USMC. At that time of the war, surface-to-air missiles had not yet been deployed and few enemy aircraft had radar, while AA guns were ineffective against fast, high-altitude targets. Air defense was still largely visual, and so a lone high-flying F2H-2P was almost impossible for ground forces to shoot down. The aircraft was in demand for its invaluable battlefield photography. F2H-2Ps had USAF fighter escorts when in areas frequented by enemy fighters. Despite being deployed constantly throughout the war, only two F2H-2Ps were lost to radar-directed AA gunfire, and suffered no air-to-air losses.

The USN deployed the radar-equipped F2H-3 and F2H-4 for all-weather fleet defense after the Korean War as a stopgap measure until the swept wing Grumman F-9 Cougar and McDonnell F3H Demon, and delta wing Douglas F4D Skyray could be deployed. Later Banshee variants were only briefly on the front lines and saw no action. Similarly, the F2H-2P was superseded by the F9F-8P (later RF-9J) variant of the F9F Cougar and the F8U-1P (later RF-8A) variant of the Vought F8U Crusader as these aircraft became available.

During 1954, a Banshee flew coast-to-coast, nonstop without refueling, approximately 1,900 miles (3,100 km) from NAS Los Alamitos, California to NAS Cecil Field, Florida, in approximately four hours.

During the Korean War, the US was concerned about the lack of intelligence available should there be a war in Europe involving the Soviet Union, in particular on the location of airfields. The US Navy's "Operation Steve Brody", with four F2H-2P photo reconnaissance Banshees were to fly from a carrier on routine maneuvers off Greece and fly north, photographing Russian territory bordering the Black Sea. In May 1952, this was presented to Secretary of Defense Robert A. Lovett, but Lovett canceled it.

Later, during 1955, fears of a possible Chinese invasion of Taiwan led to Marine F2H-2Ps performing 27 overflights of possible Chinese staging areas without incident, escorted by Marine fighter Banshees based in South Korea.

=== Royal Canadian Navy ===
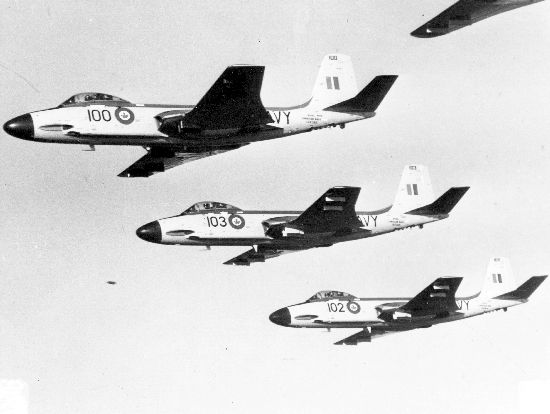
Three Royal Canadian Navy McDonnell Banshee fighters in flight

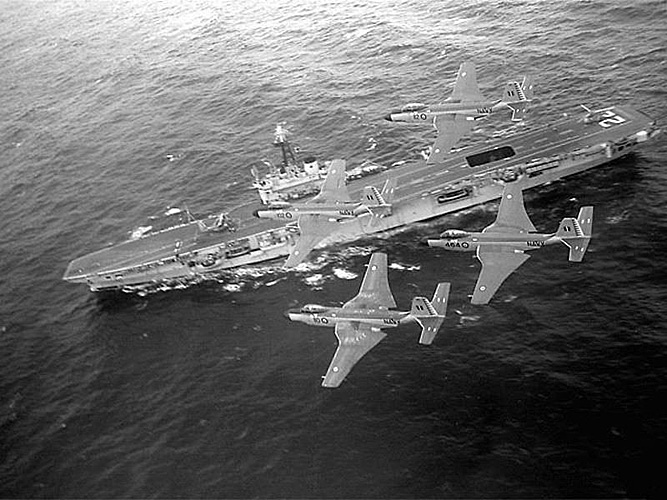
RCN Banshees overfly HMCS Bonaventure.

During 1951, the Royal Canadian Navy (RCN) drafted a $40 million deal for 60 new Banshees to replace its obsolete fleet of Hawker Sea Furies. However, the purchase was not approved by the Parliament of Canada until 1953, by which point production of the Banshee had been terminated. Accordingly, the RCN acquired 39 second-hand US Navy F2H-3s for $25 million which were delivered between 1955 and 1958. They would be flown from HMCS Bonaventure or as NORAD interceptors from shore bases.

In order to improve the Banshee as an interceptor, the RCN equipped their aircraft with AIM-9 Sidewinder missiles. During November 1959, the RCN conducted sea trials of the Sidewinder, resulting in the successful downing of several remotely piloted drones.

Although initially well-liked by its Canadian pilots for its flying qualities, the Banshee began to suffer from problems. The RCN would eventually lose 12 of its original 39 Banshees to accidents, a loss rate of 30.8%. One Banshee and its pilot were lost after an inflight failure of the folding wing mechanism, and another Banshee suffered a brake failure and rolled off the carrier's deck into the ocean, drowning its pilot.

Banshee utilization fell as the RCN shifted to anti-submarine warfare (ASW), which did not anticipate aerial attacks, and so there was little need for the Banshee under this doctrine. Also, due to the carrier's small size, there was no room to accommodate Banshees when Bonaventure was carrying enough Grumman CS2F Trackers to conduct around-the-clock ASW patrols, so it regularly operated without them. The Canadian military was also under pressure to reduce its budget, and the obsolescent Banshees were expensive to maintain as their age, punishing carrier service, and the harsh North Atlantic were taking their toll. Having been the only jet-powered carrier-based fighters deployed by the RCN, the last examples were retired without replacement during September 1962.

Banshees were the primary aircraft of the short-lived RCN Grey Ghosts aerobatic team. The team's name was a play on the Banshee name and the RCN color scheme. The RCN was too small to dedicate aircraft for airshows, so the team flew available operational Banshees for each show.

Aside from the three former RCN Banshees that survive, RCN Banshees were cut up for scrap or burned in firefighting exercises upon their retirement.

== Variants ==
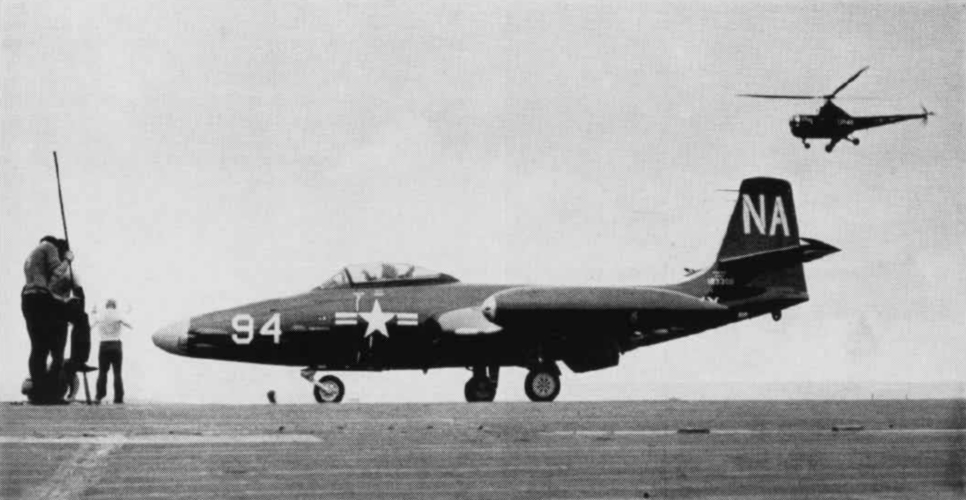
VC-4 made a single deployment with F2H-2N night fighters aboard Franklin D. Roosevelt in 1951.

XF2H-1
Company designation Model 24B, originally designated XF2D-1. Prototype aircraft, three built.
F2H-1
Single-seat fighter version, two 3,000 lbf (1,400 kgf) Westinghouse J34-WE-22 turbojet engines. Initial production version, 56 built.
XF2H-2
Company designation Model 24K, proposed swept-wing variant with afterburners. Unrelated to the production F2H-2.
F2H-2
Improved version with detachable wingtip fuel tanks, eight underwing weapons pylons for 1,580 lb (454 kg) stores capability, 3,250 lbf (1,475 kgf) Westinghouse J34-WE-34 turbojet engines. Second production version, 308 built.
F2H-2B
Single-seat fighter-bomber version, strengthened portside weapons pylon for 3,230 lb (1,465 kg) Mark 8 nuclear bomb, 25 built.
F2H-2N
Single-seat night fighter version with APS-19 radar housed in lengthened nose, 14 built.
Model 24AN
A single F2H-2N (BuNo 123311) modified with a fuselage extension as an aerodynamic prototype for an all-weather fighter variant.
F2H-2P
Single-seat photo-reconnaissance version with lengthened nose housing six cameras, 89 built.
XF2H-3
Company designation Model 24L, proposed swept-wing variant with afterburners. Unrelated to the production F2H-3.
F2H-3
Company designation Model 24AR, single-seat all-weather fighter version, lengthened fuselage, redesigned tail, increased fuel capacity, eight underwing weapons pylons for 3,000 lb (1,361 kg) bomb load, APQ-41 radar in enlarged nose. 250 built. Redesignated as F-2C in 1962.
F2H-3P
Proposed photo-reconnaissance version of the F2H-3; not built.
XF2H-4
Company designation Model 24M, proposed swept-wing variant without afterburners. Unrelated to the production F2H-4.
F2H-4
Improved all-weather fighter version, 3,600 lbf (16,000 N) thrust Westinghouse J34-WE-38 turbojet engines, APG-37 radar, otherwise similar to F2H-3. Final production version, 150 built. Redesignated as F-2D in 1962.
XF2H-5
Unofficial designation for unbuilt proposed swept-wing version with wings, tail and afterburners similar to those of the XF-88 Voodoo.

== Operators ==
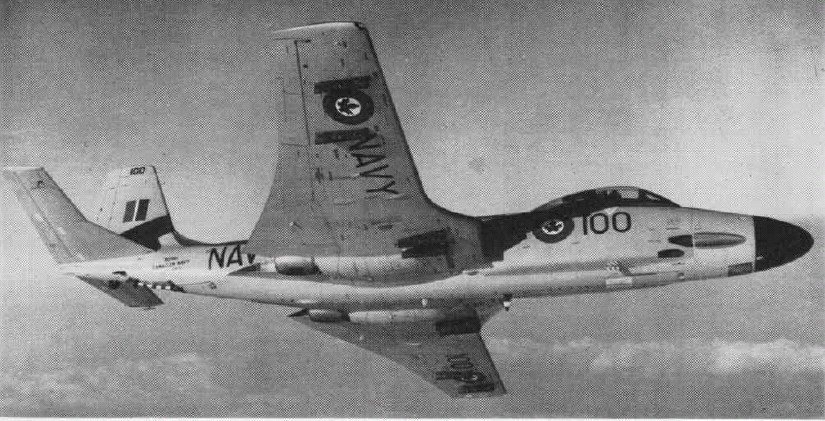
RCN Banshee banking, showing enlarged horizontal tail with extensions characteristic of the F2H-3 and -4

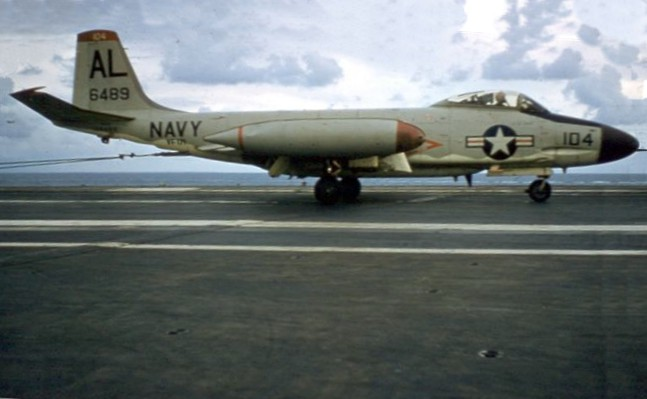
VF-171 F2H-3 landing on USS Franklin D. Roosevelt

Canada

- Royal Canadian Navy (F2H-3)
  - 870 Naval Air Squadron
  - 871 Naval Air Squadron
  - VX-10 (Test Squadron)

United States

- United States Navy
  - VX-3 (Evaluation) (F2H-1, F2H-4)
  - VF-11 (F2H-2, F2H-4)
  - VF-12 (F2H-2)
  - VF-22 (F2H-2, F2H-4)
  - VF-23 (F2H-3)
  - VF-31 (F2H-3)
  - VF-41 (F2H-3)
  - VF-52 (F2H-3)
  - VF-62 (F2H-2, F2H-2P)
  - VF-92 (F2H-3, F2H-4)
  - VF-101 (F2H-1, F2H-2B)
  - VF-114 (F2H-3)
  - VF-141 (F2H-3)
  - VF-152 (F2H-3)
  - VF-171 (F2H-1, F2H-2)
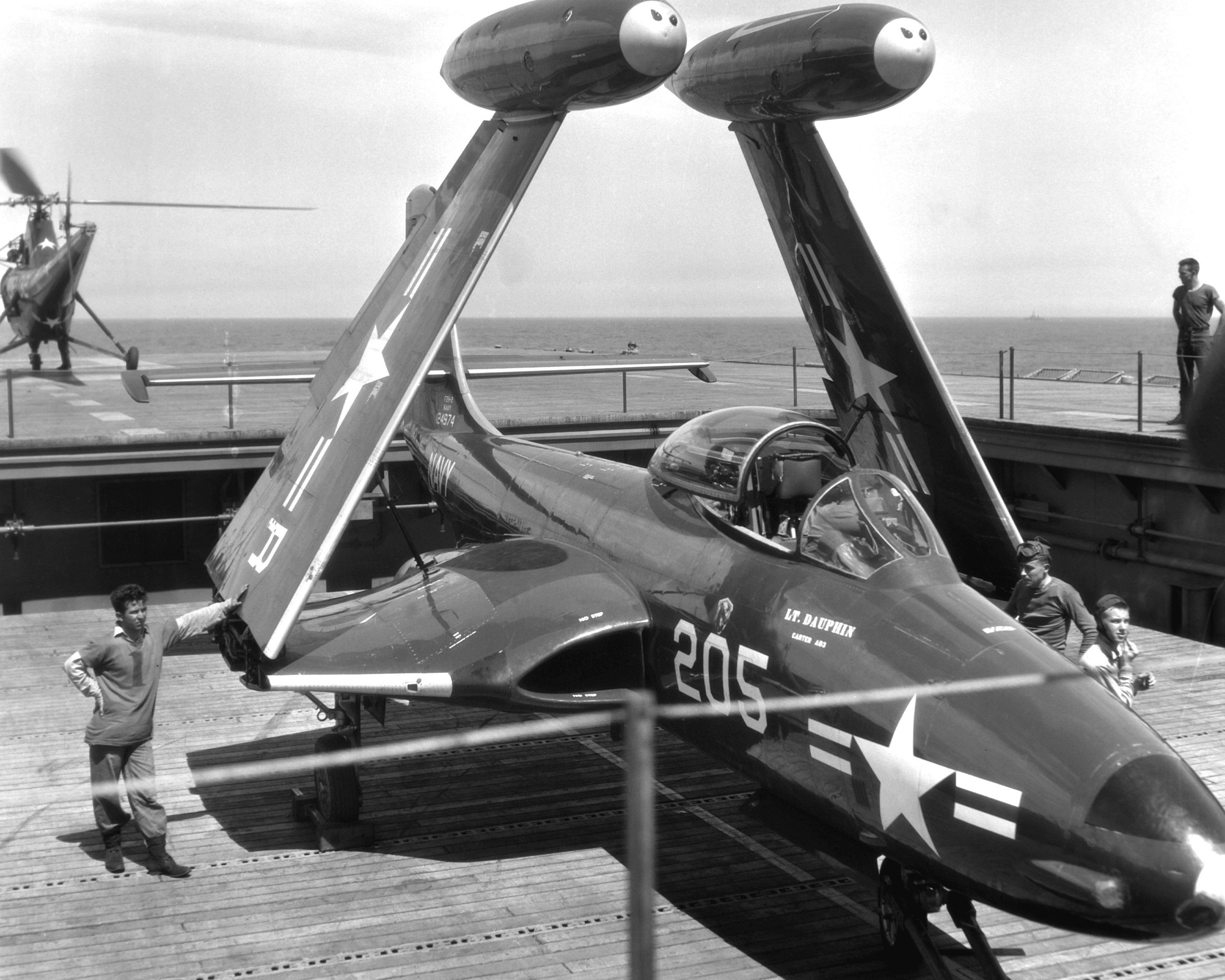
    VF-172 F2H-2 on USS Essex off Korea, 1951
  - VF-172 (F2H-1, F2H-2, F2H-2B, F2H-4)
  - VF-213 (F2H-3)
  - VC-3 (F2H-3)
  - VC-4 (F2H-2B, F2H-2N, F2H-3, F2H-4)
  - VC-61 (F2H-2P)
  - VC-62 (F2H-2P)

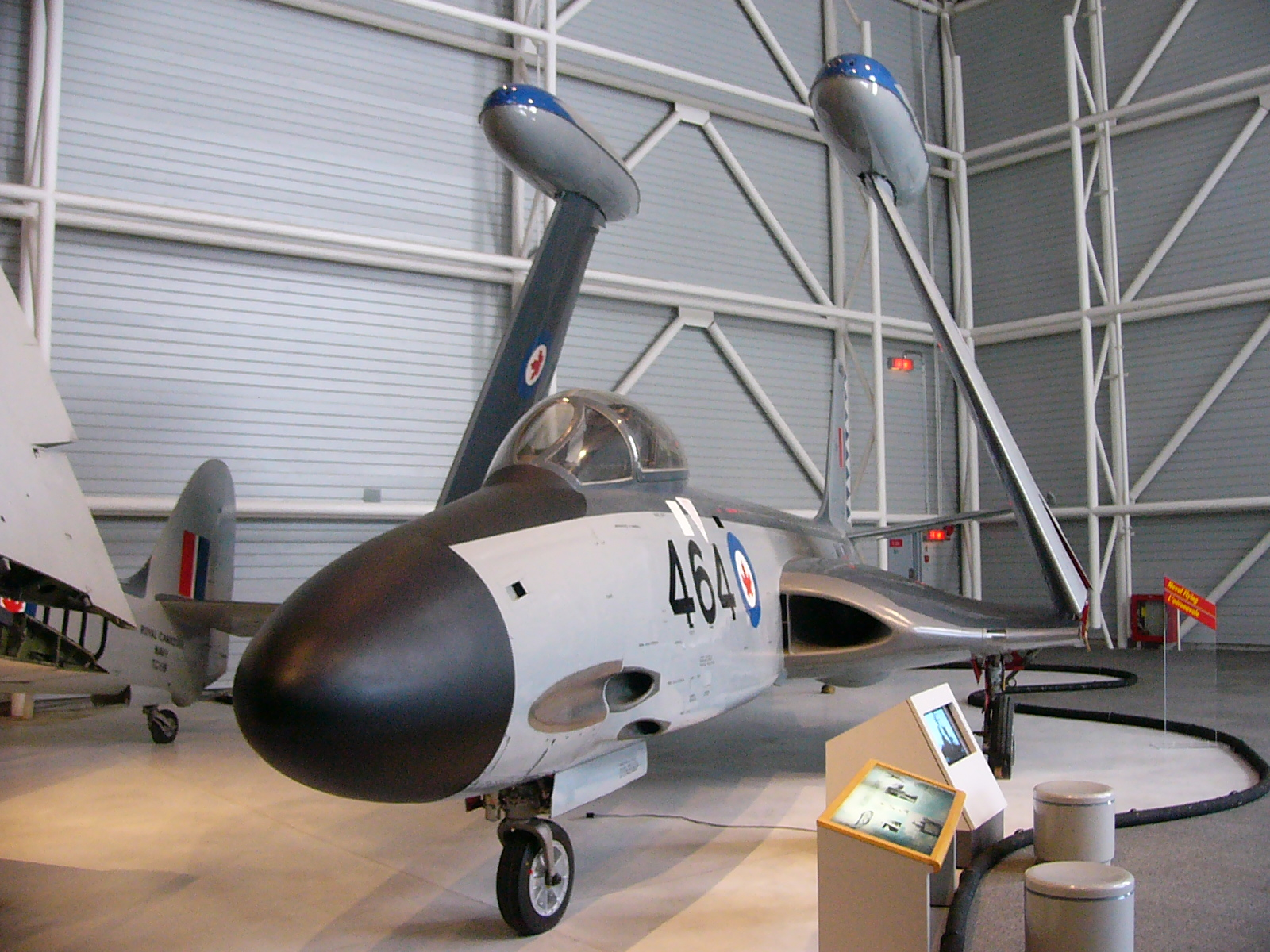
RCN Banshee at Canada Aviation and Space Museum

- United States Marine Corps Aviation
  - VMF-114
  - VMF-122 (F2H-2)
  - VMF-214 (F2H-4)
  - VMF-224 (F2H-2)
  - VMF(N)-533 (F2H-4)
  - VMJ-1 (F2H-2P)
  - VMJ-2 (F2H-2P)

== Aircraft on display ==
Surviving examples are on display in private collections and at several naval air stations and marine corps air stations in the United States as well as in Canada.

=== Canada ===
F2H-3

- BuNo 126334 – The Military Museums, in Calgary, Alberta.
- BuNo 126402 – Shearwater Aviation Museum in Shearwater, Nova Scotia.
- BuNo 126464 – Canada Aviation and Space Museum in Ottawa, Ontario.

=== United States ===
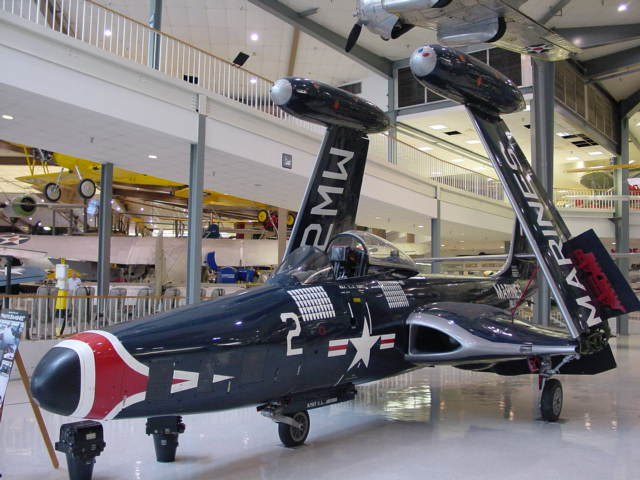
F2H-2P at the National Museum of Naval Aviation

F2H-2

- BuNo 124988 – Flying Leatherneck Aviation Museum, MCAS Miramar, California.
- BuNo 125052 – USS Lexington Museum, Corpus Christi, Texas.
- BuNo 127693 – NAS Oceana Air Park at NAS Oceana, Virginia.

F2H-2P

- BuNo 125690 – Pima Air & Space Museum, adjacent to Davis-Monthan AFB in Tucson, Arizona.
- BuNo 126673 – National Naval Aviation Museum at Naval Air Station Pensacola, Florida.
- BuNo 128885 – Howell Park in Baton Rouge, Louisiana.

F2H-4

- BuNo 127663 – National Naval Aviation Museum at Naval Air Station Pensacola, Florida. Painted as F2H-3 126419.

== Specifications (F2H-3) ==
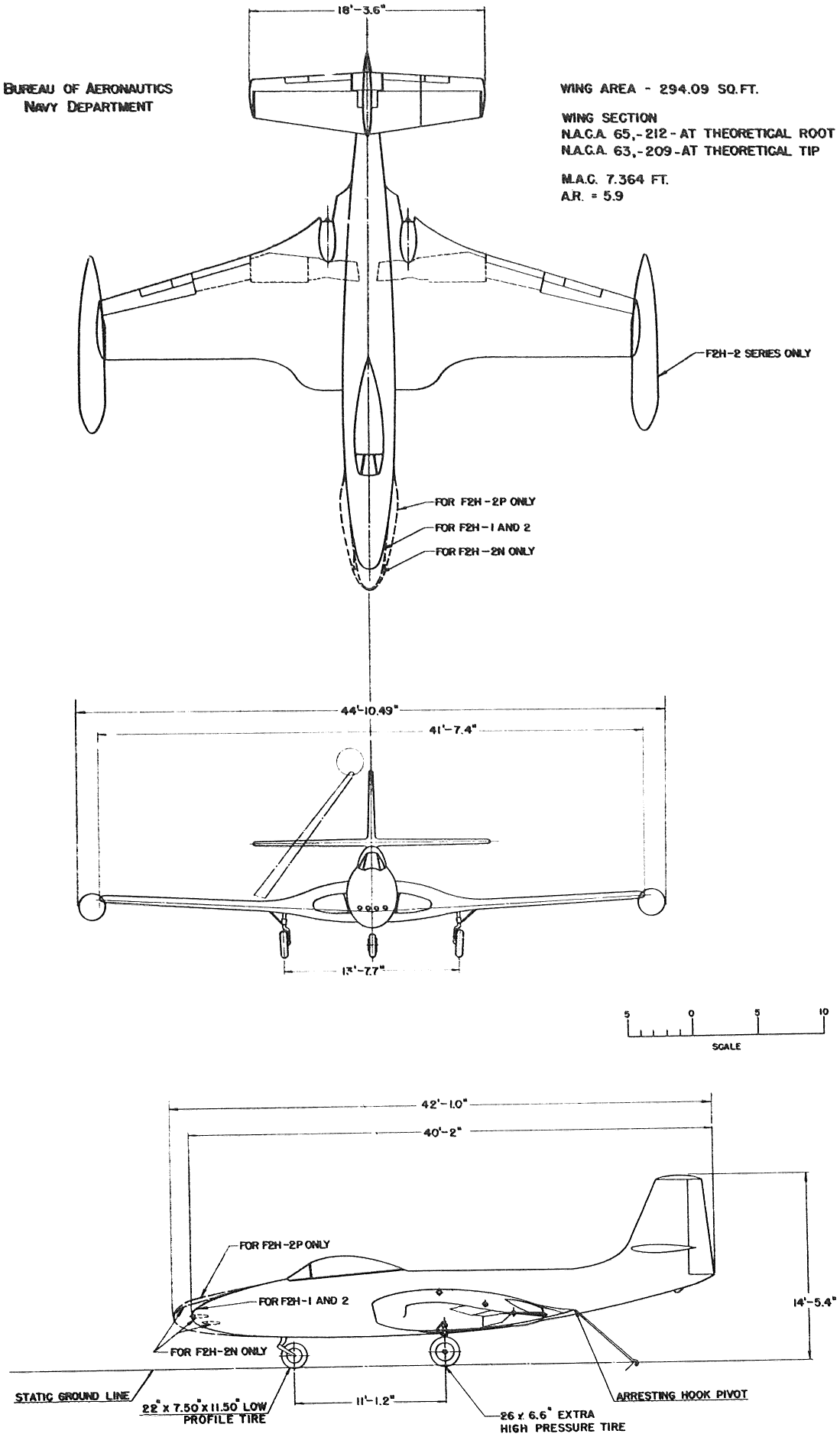
3-view line drawing of the McDonnell F2H-2 Banshee

Data from McDonnell Douglas Aircraft since 1920, Combat Aircraft since 1945, U.S. Navy Standard Aircraft Characteristics, except as noted

General characteristics

- Crew: 1
- Length: 48 ft 2 in (14.68 m)
- Wingspan: 41 ft 9 in (12.73 m)
- Height: 14 ft 6 in (4.42 m)
- Wing area: 294 sq ft (27.3 m^{2})
- Airfoil: wing root: NACA 65-212, wing tip: NACA 65-209
- Empty weight: 13,183 lb (5,980 kg)
- Gross weight: 21,013 lb (9,531 kg)
- Max takeoff weight: 25,214 lb (11,437 kg)
- Powerplant: 2 × Westinghouse J34-WE-34 turbojet engines, 3,250 lbf (14.5 kN) thrust each

Performance

- Maximum speed: 580 mph (930 km/h, 500 kn) at sea level
- Cruise speed: 461 mph (742 km/h, 401 kn)
- Combat range: 1,168 mi (1,880 km, 1,015 nmi) on internal fuel
- Ferry range: 1,710 mi (2,760 km, 1,490 nmi) with two 170-gal drop tanks
- Service ceiling: 47,000 ft (14,000 m)
- Rate of climb: 6,000 ft/min (30 m/s)

Armament

- 4 × 20 mm (0.787 in) Colt Mk 12 cannon, 220 rounds/gun (upper pair), 250 rounds/gun (lower pair)
- 8 × 60 lb (27 kg) High Explosive rockets

or

- 6 × 500 lb (230 kg) bombs and 2 × 60 lb (27 kg) H.E. rockets

or

- 2 × AIM-9 Sidewinder missiles (Both in US Navy & Royal Canadian Navy (RCN) service)

Avionics

- AN/APG-30 – Fire-control radar
- AN/APG-36 or AN/APG-37 – Search radar
- AN/APG-51 – Intercept radar
- AN/APN-1 – UHF radar altimeter

== See also ==
Related development

- McDonnell FH Phantom

Aircraft of comparable role, configuration, and era

- de Havilland Sea Venom
- Grumman F9F Panther
- Hawker Sea Hawk
- Supermarine Attacker

Related lists

- List of fighter aircraft
- List of carrier-based aircraft
- List of military aircraft of the United States
- List of United States Navy aircraft designations (pre-1962)
