= Westinghouse J40 =

Turbojet Aircraft Engine

J40
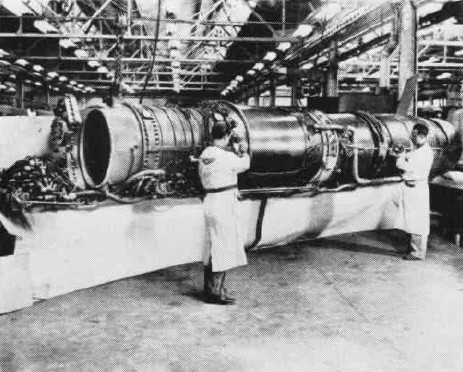
- Type: Turbojet
- National origin: United States
- Manufacturer: Westinghouse Aviation Gas Turbine Division
- Major applications: McDonnell F3H Demon

The Westinghouse J40 was an early high-performance afterburning turbojet engine designed by Westinghouse Aviation Gas Turbine Division starting in 1946 to a US Navy Bureau of Aeronautics (BuAer) request. BuAer intended to use the design in several fighter aircraft and a bomber. However, while an early low-power design was successful, attempts to scale it up to its full design power failed, and the design was finally abandoned, deemed a "fiasco" and a "flop".

The design originally called for an engine of 7,500 lbf (33 kN) thrust at sea level static conditions without afterburner and 10,900 lbf thrust with afterburner. A more powerful model 9,500/13,700 lbf thrust version was intended to replace the earlier engines in the various airframes. In total, thirteen different variations were planned. The projected need for the higher-power engines led BuAer to place a second source production contract with Ford Motor Company, Lincoln Mercury Division for both J40-WE-10 and J40-WE-12 engines.

The higher-powered versions proved to have a flawed compressor design and lacked a suitable control system. This left the Navy with only the earlier, lower-power engines. These were eventually used for early flight testing, but proved to be largely unusable. A particularly notorious use was in the McDonnell F3H-1N Demon, which proved to be dangerously underpowered with the smaller engines. The design was quickly grounded after repeated incidents caused by flying the now overweight airframe and a number of engine failures that led to the loss of the aircraft. A government investigation of the F3H-1N program issue failed to determine if pilots had been lost due solely to the engine issues. The grounded airframes were either scrapped or used for ground training. The F3H-2N used the Allison J71 engine.

The J40 program was terminated in 1955, by which time all the aircraft it was to power were either grounded, cancelled or redesigned to use alternative engines. The J40's failure was among those that affected the most military programs. The program failure was primarily due to lack of investment in research and experimental resources by Westinghouse, leaving them unable to resolve the issues with the various models of the engines. In 1953 Westinghouse worked with Rolls-Royce to offer engines based on the Avon, which had similar performance but matured into an excellent design of even higher output. Westinghouse was out of the aircraft engine business by 1965 when their 6,200 lbf (28 kN) thrust, scaled-down version of the 12,000 lbf (53 kN) Avon 300-series engine, the XJ54, also failed to find a United States market.

The J57 would also replace, for the U.S. Navy, the disastrous Westinghouse J40 that never fully materialized in acceptable form

— Thomas Gardner, F-100 Super Sabre at War

== Development ==
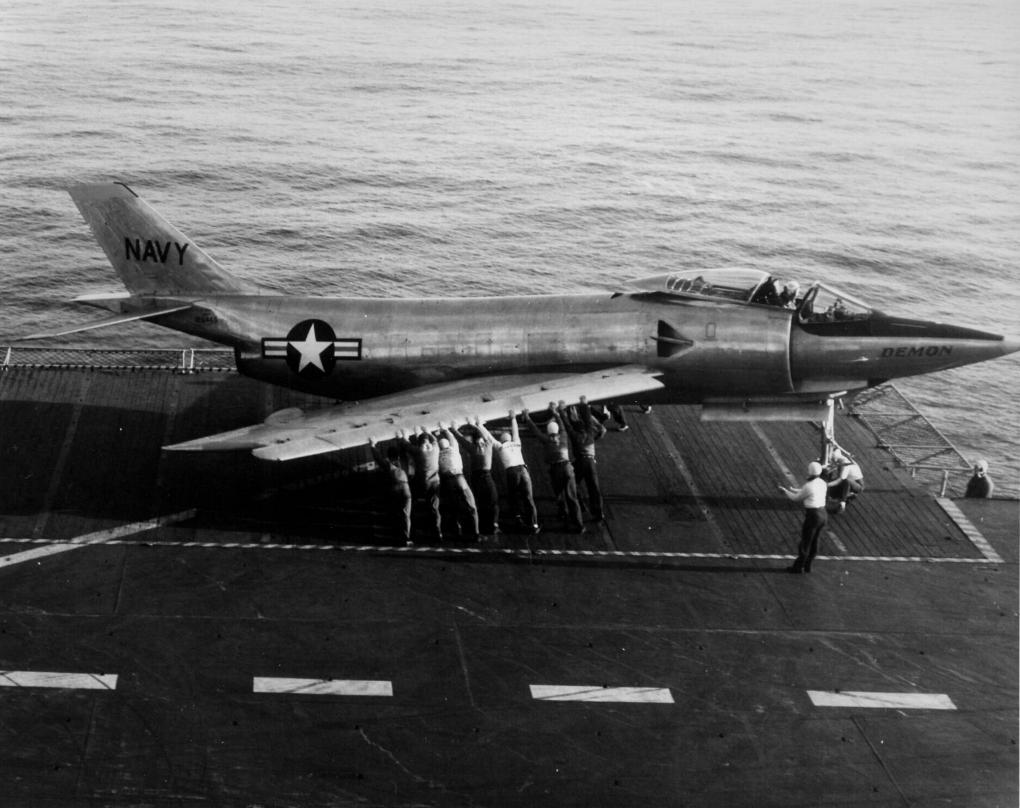
J40 powered XF3H-1 prototype on the USS Coral Sea in 1953

Westinghouse Electric Corporation established the Westinghouse Aviation Gas Turbine Division (AGT) in 1945. Along with General Electric, Westinghouse had extensive experience in turbine design that put them in the lead over established aviation engine manufacturers, who had little experience with these entirely new design concepts. While most early engines in the US were redesigned versions of British jets, the J30 was the first truly American-designed turbojet to run, and saw use in the McDonnell FH Phantom. The enlarged J34 was obsolete when introduced, but moderately successful. A new design following the rapid industry progress was needed.

The J40 represented a big opportunity for Westinghouse to become a prominent player in the turbojet engine market. The U.S. Navy showed great confidence in the company when it bet the success or failure of a new generation of jets on Westinghouse over three other engine companies. It was in June 1947 that the Navy's Bureau of Aeronautics contracted for its development. The prototype engine first ran in November 1948. According to an article in the April 1949 edition of the Naval Aviation Confidential Bulletin by Lieutenant Commander Neil D. Harkleroad of the Bureau of Aeronautics Power Plant Division, "The engine has been operating successfully to date." As of that writing, the 50-hour flight substantiation test was to have been accomplished by June 1949 and the 150-hour qualification test by December 1949.

The J40 was designed to deliver twice the thrust of engines currently in service, allowing the J40-WE-8 with afterburner to power many of the new Navy carrier-based fighters with a single engine. These included the Grumman XF10F Jaguar variable-sweep wing general-purpose fighter, the McDonnell F3H Demon and Douglas F4D Skyray interceptors. Growth to over 15,000 lbf (67 kN) of thrust in afterburner was projected. A version without afterburner, the J40-WE-6, was to power the Douglas A3D Skywarrior twin-engine carrier-based bomber.

The J40-8 was only a little over 40 inches (1,000 mm) in diameter but 25 feet (7.6 m) long, with accessories and including the afterburner. It weighed almost 3,500 pounds (1,600 kg), the -6 being almost 7 feet (2.1 m) shorter and about 600 pounds (270 kg) lighter, because it did not have an afterburner.

In 1949, a higher-power J40-WE-12 non-afterburning version developing 9,500 lbf (42 kN) thrust, with better fuel consumption, was proposed for the A3D, and an afterburning version (J40-WE-10) developing 13,700 lbf (61 kN) thrust was proposed for the fighter projects. Both versions were accepted and became the engines the airframes were designed to use. The lower-powered early development models were now intended to be used only for ground and initial flight testing until the high-powered engines became available.

== Decommission ==
Development of the big engine was protracted. The all-important 150-hour qualification test that was to have been accomplished in December 1949 was not completed until January 1951, a year behind schedule. The afterburner was particularly troublesome – the afterburning version of the engine, the J40-WE-8, did not pass its 150-hour qualification until August 1952. As a result, J40-WE-6 engines without afterburners had to be used for initial testing, causing delays in flight test programs.

Early on even the low-powered versions of the engine were considered unusable because of reliability problems. The A3D would prove successful with alternate engines, but the F3H-1 was relegated to subsonic performance using the lower-powered engine and continued to be subsonic even after substitution of the higher-power Allison J71. It has been stated, that although considered failures, the F3H-1 could have been competitive with early supersonic Air Force's Century Series fighters had the original engines delivered on their design specifications. The F3H-1N Demon single-engine jet fighter was initially a severe disappointment, due to the unreliability of the J40 and the difficulties of flying the much heavier airframe with the lower-powered J40-WE-22A engines. The airframe design had assumed the higher-powered J40-WE-10 would be the power plant. These first production Demons were grounded for a redesign to accept the J71 engine after the loss of six aircraft and four pilots.

The decision to move the Demon to the J71 had occurred long before the initial production batch emerged and with the development of a suitable afterburner for the J71 being protracted, BuAer decided to accept the early aircraft with Westinghouse J40-WE-22A and -22 engines. This decision came under Congressional review in 1955 and drew sharp criticism from Congress. Time Magazine called the Navy's grounding of all Westinghouse-powered F3H-1 Demons a "fiasco", with 21 unflyable planes, that could be used only for Navy ground training at a loss of $200 million. One high point of the J40 was the 1955 setting of an unofficial time-to-climb record, in a Demon, of 10,000 feet (3,000 m) in 71 seconds.

A replacement engine could not be easily fitted into the grounded Demons, as the fuselage had to be redesigned and enlarged. When this redesign was done to accommodate the J71, the wing area was also enlarged to counter the increased weight of the all-weather aircraft; in fact, the Demon that emerged from development was a missile-armed all-weather fighter over 8,000 lb (3,600 kg) heavier than the XF3H-1 had been, and even the high-powered J71 could not restore its performance. The F4D Skyray that had been designed to more easily accept different engines emerged in production powered by the Pratt & Whitney J57.

The A3D emerged with non-afterburning J57 engines as well. The F10F-1 program was cancelled primarily due to unsolvable aerodynamic issues with the variable-sweep wing and the control systems. The J40 engine issues were of secondary importance during the prototype flight trials.

== Variants ==
XJ40-WE-2, XJ40-WE-4
In-house development engines.
J40-WE-1
Air Force version of the J40-WE-8, powering the North American X-10 UAVs. (Two engines extant in X-10 exhibit airframe at the United States Air Force Museum in Dayton, OH)
XJ40-WE-3
Initial Air Force designation for the first proposed version of the XJ40-WE-12:
XJ40-WE-5
Air Force designation for the derated Block II/Block III versions of the XJ40-WE-12: 9,500–9,900 lbf (42–44 kN) thrust
J40-WE-6
Flight testing pre-production engines, powering the two Douglas XA3D-1 Skywarrior prototypes, Douglas XF4D-1 Skyray prototype, McDonnell F3H Demon prototypes, Grumman XF10F Jaguar prototypes: 7,500 lbf (33 kN) thrust
J40-WE-8
Pre-production engine with after-burner replaced the -6 versions in the Skyray, Demon and Jaguar. (One engine extant in the Smithsonian Air and Space Museum): 10,900 lbf (48 kN) thrust
XJ40-WE-10
Experimental afterburning version of the XJ40-WE-12. As far as can be determined, none were actually constructed although the iris type afterburner was built: 13,700 lbf (61 kN) thrust
XJ40-WE-12
Experimental higher-powered engine. Four destroyed in compressor failures on the test bed: 9,500 lbf (42 kN) thrust
XJ40-WE-14
Two spool design, placed under contract but not developed: 12,000 lbf (53 kN) thrust
XJ40-WE-16
Afterburning version of the J40-WE-14, placed under contract but not developed: 17,400 lbf (77 kN) thrust
XJ40-WE-18
Modified afterburning version of the J40-WE-10 for the Convair Skate program, proposed but not accepted. Proposal later modified for the Martin Minelayer aircraft but not accepted for that either: 11,400 lbf (51 kN) thrust with most altitude capabilities removed.
XJ40-WE-20
Modified J40-WE-10 with the afterburner to operate up to 50,000 feet, none built.
J40-WE-22/-22A
Production version of the J40-WE-8, the two models using different control systems. (One -22A extant as a cutaway exhibit in the National Naval Aviation Museum): 10,900 lbf (48 kN) thrust
XJ40-WE-24
Proposed derated early production of the J40-WE-10 engine: 12,050–13,100 lbf (53.6–58.3 kN) thrust
XJ40-WE-26
Proposed derated early production of the J40-WE-12 engine: 9,500–9,900 lbf (42–44 kN) thrust

== Applications ==
- Curtiss VF-11
- Douglas XA3D-1 Skywarrior
- Douglas XF4D-1 Skyray
- Grumman XF10F-1 Jaguar
- McDonnell F3H Demon
- North American X-10
- Vought V-362

== Specifications (J40-WE-8) ==
Data from Flight.

==== General characteristics ====
- Type: afterburning turbojet
- Length: 300 in (7.6 m)
- Diameter: 40 in (1 m)
- Dry weight: 3,500 lb (1,600 kg)

==== Components ====
- Compressor: single-spool, 11 stage axial (most sources state in error that the engine compressor had 10 stages), 50/50 action/reaction
- Combustors: annular
- Turbine: two stage
- Fuel type: JP-3, JP-4 and 100/130 avgas
- Oil system: dry sump, 4.5 US gallons (17 L; 3.7 imp gal), oil/fuel heat exchanger, 30 second inverted flight limit

==== Performance ====
- Maximum thrust: 7,300 lbf (32 kN) dry, 10,900 lbf (48 kN) wet (afterburning)
- Overall pressure ratio: 5.2:1
- Specific fuel consumption: 0.94 lb/(lbf⋅h) (27 g/(kN⋅s)) dry, 2.2 lb/(lbf⋅h) (62 g/(kN⋅s)) wet (afterburning)
- Thrust-to-weight ratio: 2.14 dry, 3 wet (afterburning)

== See also ==
Related lists

- List of aircraft engines

== Bibliography ==
- Dorr, Robert (2006-01-23). "Engine faults 'dashed' Demon's Navy career". Army Times.
- Green, William (1967). The World Guide to Combat Planes. Doubleday.
- Kay, Anthony L. (2007). Turbojet History and Development 1930-1960 Volume 2:USSR, USA, Japan, France, Canada, Sweden, Switzerland, Italy and Hungary (1st ed.). Ramsbury: The Crowood Press. ISBN 978-1861269393.
- "B-66 Destroyer / A3D Skywarrior".
- Christiansen, Paul J. (2015). Westinghouse J40 Axial Turbojet Family, Development History and Technical Profiles (1st ed.). Olney, Maryland: Bleeg Press. ISBN 978-0692358528.
