= Interstate XBDR =

XBDR-1
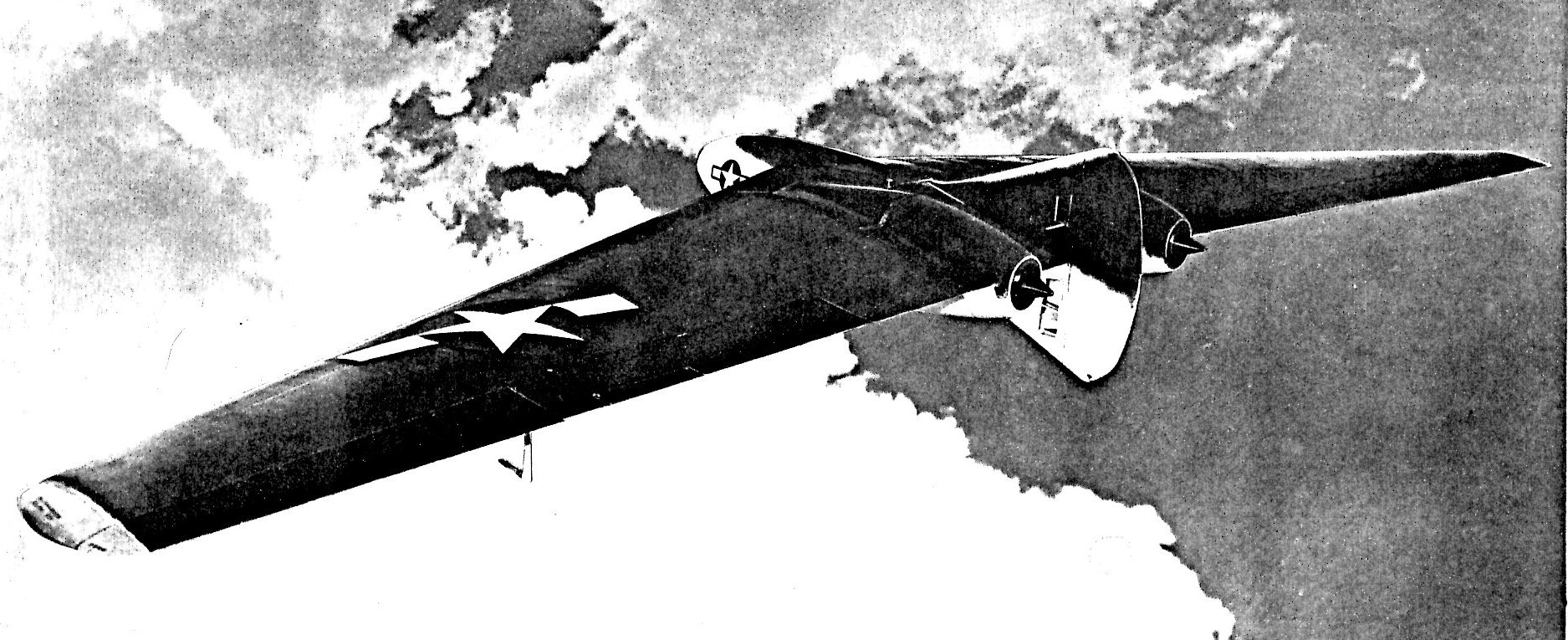
- Artist's concept of the Interstate XBDR-1 jet-powered assault drone in flight.

General information
- Type: Assault drone
- National origin: United States
- Manufacturer: Interstate Aircraft
- Primary user: United States Navy
- Number built: 0

The Interstate XBDR was a design for an assault drone - an early television-guided missile - powered by two jet engines, that was designed by the Interstate Aircraft and Engineering Corporation during the latter stages of the Second World War for use by the United States Navy. Wind tunnel tests of a scale model were conducted, however no full-scale examples of the aircraft were built before the project was cancelled.

== Design ==
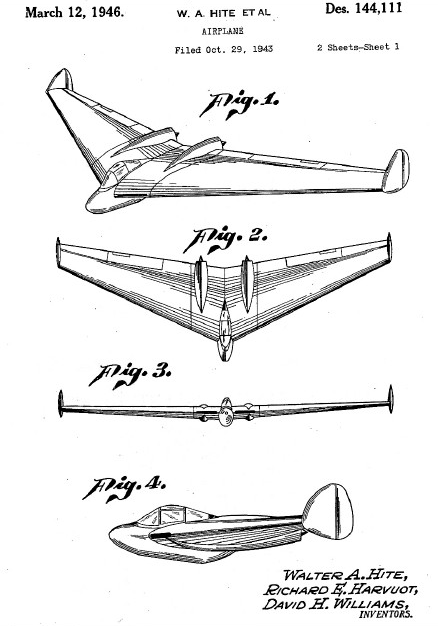
Interstate XBDR-1 patent

Referred to at the time as an "assault drone", and the only aircraft ever designated in the 'BD' series, the XBDR-1 was designed by Interstate in response to a Navy requirement in late 1943 and early 1944. The aircraft featured a tailless design, and was essentially a flying wing with a small vertical stabiliser. The XBDR-1 was intended to be powered by two Westinghouse 19B axial-flow turbojet engines, which were to be buried in the wing near the wing roots. The planned warload was not detailed, however it was planned that the assault drone would be guided to its target via a television link.

== Testing and Cancellation ==
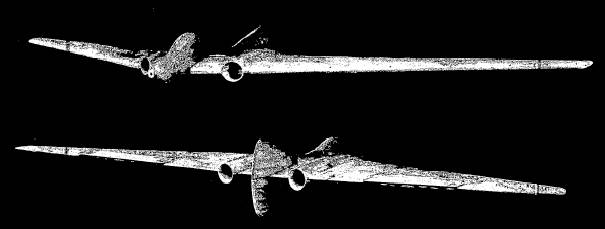
1/17-scale wind tunnel model of the XBDR-1 with alternative intakes

Two prototypes (BuNos 37635 and 37636) were ordered, and tests of a 1/17-scale model of the XBDR were conducted in a NACA gust tunnel at Langley Field in 1944. Requested by the Bureau of Aeronautics in an attempt to determine the load factors of the unusually configured aircraft, these tests initially encountered difficulty with the center of gravity of the model, but once this was resolved the tests were successfully carried out, and a gust factor of 1.22 was recommended for use in the design. Despite the successful testing the Navy decided not to pursue full-scale development of the aircraft, and the order for the two prototypes was cancelled.

== Specifications (XBDR-1) ==
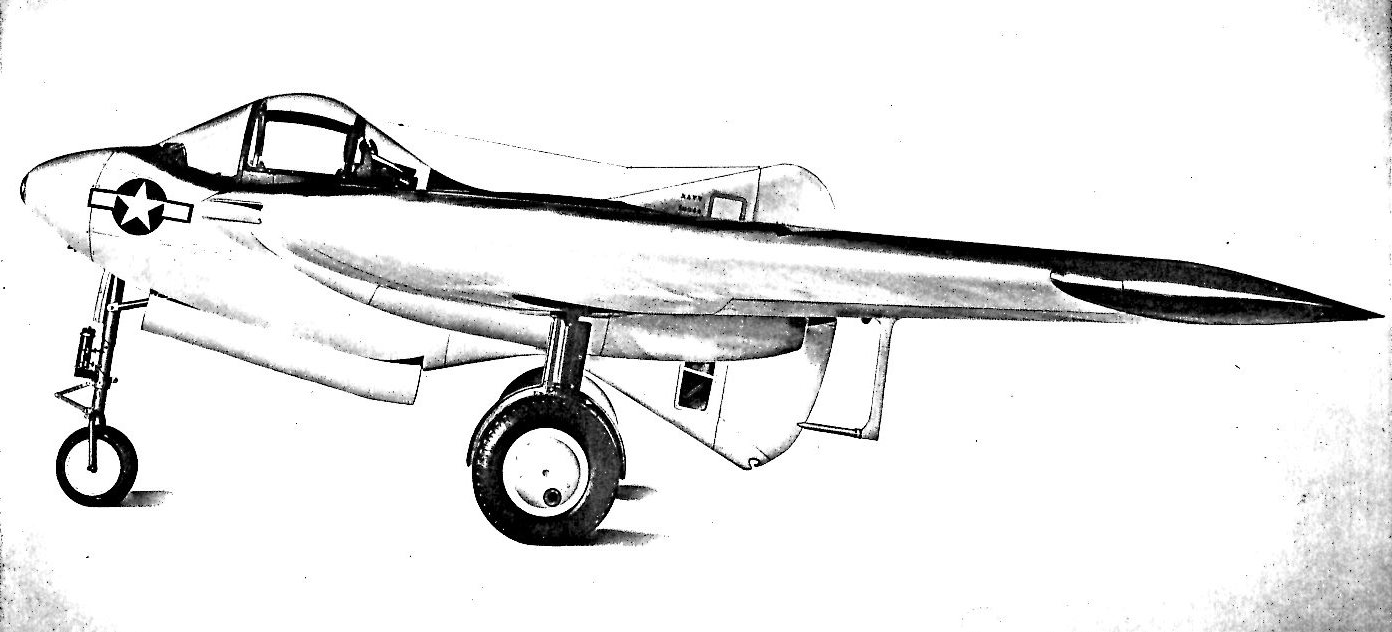
Artist's concept of a piloted version of the XBDR-1

Data from

General characteristics

- Crew: None (UAV)
- Wingspan: 51.66 ft (15.75 m)
- Wing area: 362 sq ft (33.6 m^{2})
- Gross weight: 10,800 lb (4,899 kg)
- Powerplant: 2 × Westinghouse 19B turbojets, 1,550 lbf (6.9 kN) thrust each

Performance

- Wing loading: 29.8 lb/sq ft (145 kg/m^{2})

== See also ==
- History of unmanned aerial vehicles

Aircraft of comparable role, configuration, and era

- Gorgon (U.S. missile)
- Horten Ho 229
- Interstate TDR
- LTV-N-2 Loon
- McDonnell LBD Gargoyle
- Northrop XP-79

Related lists

- List of unmanned aerial vehicles
- List of United States Navy aircraft designations (pre-1962)
