= Vought F6U Pirate =

1946 carrier-based fighter aircraft by Vought

F6U Pirate
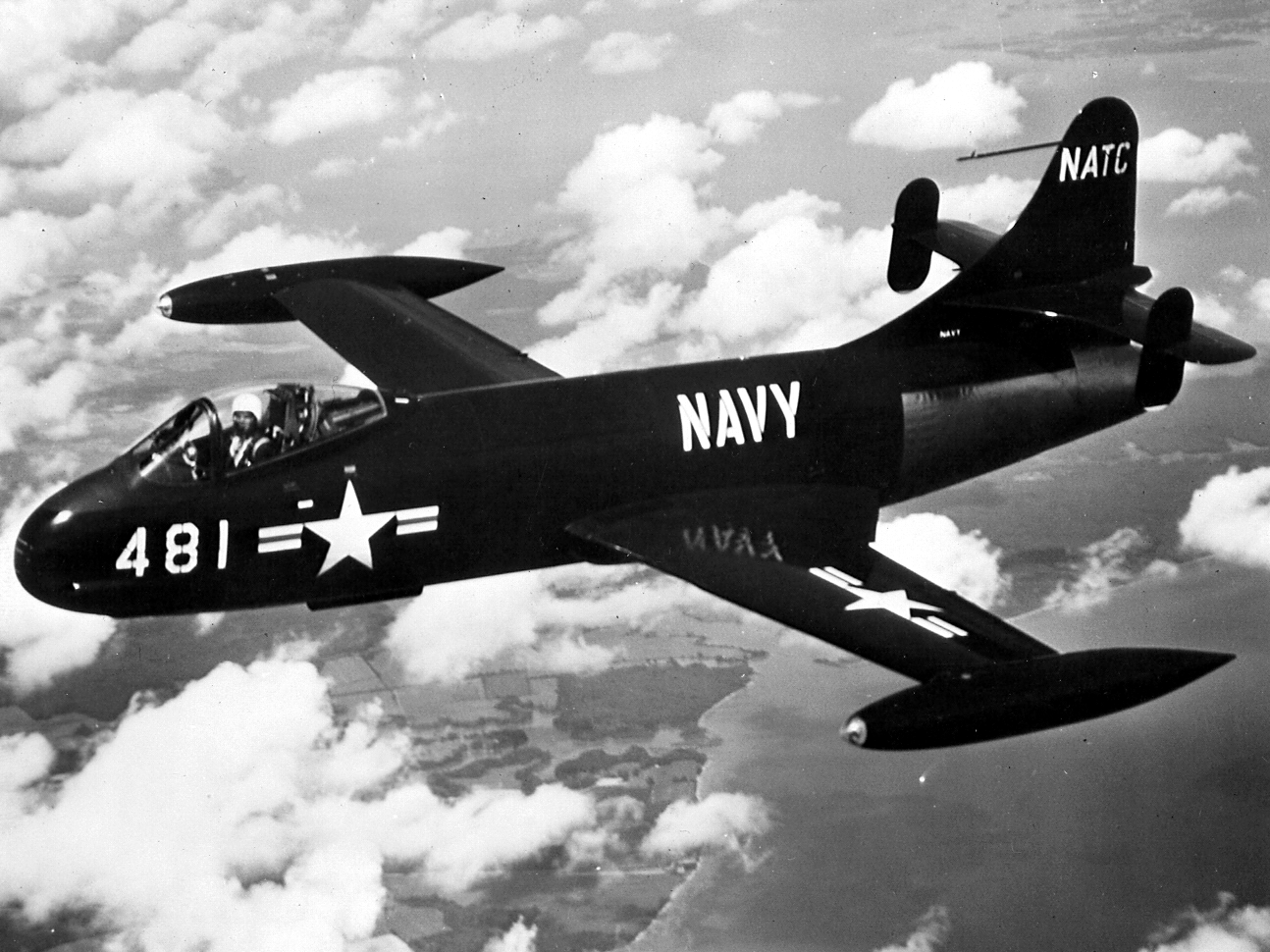

General information
- Type: Fighter aircraft
- Manufacturer: Chance Vought
- Status: Cancelled in 1950
- Primary user: United States Navy (Intended)
- Number built: 33

History
- First flight: 2 October 1946

The Vought F6U Pirate is an early turbojet-powered fighter aircraft designed and produced by the American aircraft manufacturer Vought. It was the company's first jet powered fighter.

The design process begun in late 1944 to produce a carrier-based fighter powered by the newly-developed Westinghouse 24C (later J34) axial turbojet engine for the United States Navy. First flown on 2 October 1946, it was a relatively small aircraft, being composed largely of "Metalite" and "Fabrilite". Although pioneering the use of turbojet power as the first naval fighter with an afterburner and composite material construction, the aircraft proved to be underpowered and was judged unsuitable for combat, even after the severe aerodynamic issues encountered early on were addressed. Accordingly, production was cancelled in 1950 and no F6Us were ever issued to operational squadrons, the type being instead relegated to development, training, and test roles.

== Design and development ==
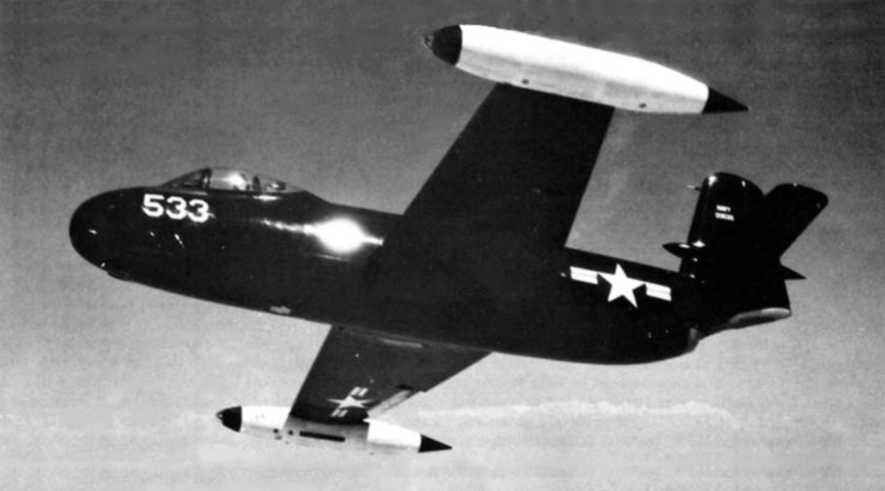
An XF6U-1 without afterburner.

The origins of the F6U can be traced back to the issuing of a specification by the US Navy's Bureau of Aeronautics (BuAer) that sought a single-seat carrier-based fighter powered by a Westinghouse 24C (later J34) axial turbojet on 5 September 1944. Chance Vought was awarded a contract for three V-340 (company designation) prototypes on 29 December 1944.

The XF6U was a compact aircraft with straight wings and tail surfaces as well as a tricycle undercarriage. The wings were short enough that folding wings were not used to reduce the aircraft's footprint on a carrier deck. To fit more aircraft into crowded hangars, the nose gear could be retracted and the aircraft's weight would rest on a small wheel attached by the ground crew, which raised the tail up so that it could overlap the nose of the aircraft behind it, allowing more aircraft to fit into available hangar space. The turbojet engine was mounted in the rear fuselage and was fed by ducts in each wing root.

The most unusual feature of the aircraft was its use of "Metalite" for its skin. This was made of balsa wood, sandwiched between two thin sheets of aluminum. "Fabrilite" was also used for the surfaces of the vertical stabilizer and rudder; this materiel was similar to Metalite but used fiberglass instead of aluminum. Two fuel tanks were fitted in the center of the fuselage; the forward tank, ahead of the wing, contained 220 US gallons (830 L; 180 imp gal) and the rear tank, 150 US gallons (570 L; 120 imp gal). These were supplemented by two jettisonable 140-US-gallon (530 L; 120 imp gal) tip tanks. The cockpit was in a relatively forward position and was provided with a bubble canopy which gave the pilot good external visibility. Aiming was achieved via a Mk 6 lead-computing gyro gunsight. Four 20 mm (0.79 in) M3 autocannon were located directly underneath the cockpit, the 600 rounds of ammunition for which were stored behind the pilot. The empty casings of the two upper guns were retained in the aircraft, while those from the two lower guns were ejected overboard.

A company-wide contest was held to name the aircraft, resulting in the initial prototype receiving the name Pirate, it made its maiden flight on 2 October 1946. Flight testing revealed severe aerodynamic problems, mostly caused by the airfoil section and thickness of the wing. The vertical stabilizer also had to be redesigned to smooth out the airflow at the intersection of the horizontal and vertical stabilizers. Other changes included the addition of dive brakes on the sides of the fuselage and the replacement of the Metalite panels near the engine exhaust with stainless steel counterparts.

The first XF6U-1 prototype was powered by a Westinghouse J34-WE-22 turbojet with 3,000 lbf (13.34 kN) thrust, one third of the weight of the aircraft. To help improve the underpowered aircraft's performance, the third prototype, which first flew on 10 November 1947, was lengthened by 8 feet (2.4 m) to use a Westinghouse J34-WE-30 afterburning engine of 4,224 lbf (18.78 kN) thrust, the first United States Navy fighter to have such a powerplant.

== Operational history ==
In 1947, prior to the completion of the flight testing of the prototypes, an initial batch of 30 production aircraft was ordered. These incorporated an ejection seat and a redesigned vertical stabilizer as well as a pair of auxiliary fins, one towards the tip on each side of the tailplane in an attempt to improve the directional stability of the aircraft. The fuselage was lengthened to fit additional equipment and the wing had fillets added at the rear junction with the fuselage.

During the production run, the US Navy decided to move the Chance Vought factory from Stratford, Connecticut, to a much larger facility in Dallas, Texas, which had been vacant since the end of World War II; this transfer badly disrupted the production of the Pirate. The airframes were built in Stratford and trucked to Dallas, where government-furnished equipment, such as the engines and afterburners, were installed. The completed aircraft were then taxied around the new plant's airfield, but the runway was deemed too short to handle jets. The aircraft had to be disassembled and trucked to an abandoned airfield at Ardmore, Oklahoma, with a runway long enough for acceptance testing.

The first production F6U-1 performed its initial flight on 29 June 1949, and 20 of the aircraft were provided to VX-3, an operational evaluation squadron based at Naval Air Station Patuxent River in Maryland. The judgment from the evaluation was that the Pirate was unacceptable for operational use. Naval aviators disparagingly called the F6U the "groundhog". On 30 October 1950, BuAer informed Vought of the Navy's opinion of the Pirate in terms that were both bureaucratic and scathing: "The F6U-1 had proven so sub-marginal in performance that combat utilization is not feasible."

Those aircraft that had been produced were used primarily to develop arresting gear and barriers, but were used operationally for a short time by at least one Texas-based United States Naval Reserve squadron as they transferred to jets. The 30 production aircraft had only a total of 945 hours of flight time, 31.5 hours each. Some aircraft flew only six hours which was enough for little more than their acceptance flight and the flight to their disposition. The downfall of the aircraft was that it was underpowered and was at times considered "sub-marginal", which was not an unusual problem with jets of the era.

== Variants ==
XF6U-1
Three prototypes, two with a Westinghouse J34-WE-22 turbojet engine (BuNo 33532, 33533), one with a J34-WE-30 with afterburner (BuNo 33534).
F6U-1
Afterburner-equipped production version, 30 built (BuNo 122478-122507), 35 cancelled.
F6U-1P
Conversion of one F6U-1 (BuNo 122483) for photo-reconnaissance.

== Operators ==
United States

- United States Navy
  - VX-3

== Surviving aircraft ==
Although the F6U had a very short operational career, one example remains intact (122479, Vought production number 2) and has undergone restoration by the Vought Aircraft Heritage Foundation, at the Vought plant in Grand Prairie, Texas. As of 2012, the aircraft is currently at the National Naval Aviation Museum in Pensacola, Florida.

In February 2025, the F6U was offered for a long term loan to the Fort Worth Aviation Museum, who accepted the agreement. On 8 June, the museum took delivery of the aircraft following an overland journey from Pensacola.

== Specifications (F6U-1) ==

Data from The Complete Book of Fighters

General characteristics

- Crew: 1
- Length: 37 ft 7 in (11.46 m)
- Wingspan: 32 ft 10 in (10 m)
- Height: 12 ft 11 in (3.39 m)
- Wing area: 203.4 sq ft (18.9 m^{2})
- Empty weight: 7,320 lb (3,320 kg)
- Gross weight: 12,900 lb (5,850 kg)
- Powerplant: 1 × Westinghouse J34-WE-30A turbojet, 3,150 lbf (14.0 kN) thrust dry, 4,224 lbf (18.79 kN) with afterburner

Performance

- Maximum speed: 596 mph (959 km/h, 517 kn)
- Range: 1,170 mi (1,880 km, 1,020 nmi)
- Service ceiling: 46,260 ft (14,100 m)
- Rate of climb: 8,060 ft/min (40.95 m/s)
- Wing loading: 63.4 lb/sq ft (304 kg/m^{2})
- Thrust/weight: 0.327

Armament

- Guns: 4 × 20 mm (0.79 in) M3 cannon under the nose

== See also ==
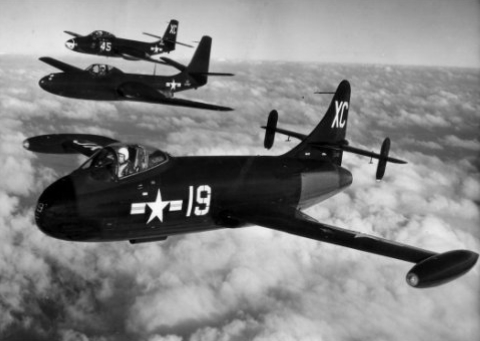
An F6U (foreground) with its competitors FH Phantom (middle) and F2H Banshee (rear).

Aircraft of comparable role, configuration, and era

- de Havilland Sea Vampire
- Hawker Sea Hawk
- McDonnell FH Phantom
- North American FJ-1 Fury
- Supermarine Attacker

Related lists

- List of fighter aircraft
- List of United States Navy aircraft designations (pre-1962)
