= J32 =

J32 may refer to:

- J/32, an American sailboat design
- British Aerospace Jetstream J32, a British airliner
- Chronic sinusitis
- Honda J32, an automobile engine
- Johor State Route J32, Johor State Route J32
- Nissan Teana J32, a Japanese sedan
- Pentagonal orthocupolarotunda, a Johnson solid (J_{32})
- Saab J 32 Lansen, a Swedish attack aircraft
- Westinghouse J32, an American jet engine
- LNER Class J32, a class of British steam locomotives
