= Westinghouse Combustion Turbine Systems Division =

Manufacturer of turbines

The Westinghouse Combustion Turbine Systems Division (CTSD), part of Westinghouse Electric Corporation's Westinghouse Power Generation group, was originally located, along with the Steam Turbine Division (STD), in a major industrial manufacturing complex, referred to as the South Philadelphia Works, in Lester, Pennsylvania near to the Philadelphia International Airport.

Before first being called "CTSD" in 1978, the Westinghouse industrial and electric utility gas turbine business operation progressed through several other names: Small Steam & Gas Turbine Division (SSGT) in the 1950s through 1971; Gas Turbine Systems Division (GTSD); and Generation Systems Division (GSD) through the mid-late 1970s.

The name CTSD came with the passage of energy legislation by the US government in 1978 which prohibited electric utilities from building new base load power plants that burned natural gas. Some participants in the industry decided to use the name "combustion turbine" in an attempt to gain some separation from the fact that the primary fuel for gas turbines in large power plants is natural gas.

Commonly referred to as a gas turbine, a modern combustion turbine can operate on a variety of gaseous and liquid fuels. The preferred liquid fuel is No. 2 distillate. With proper treatment, crude and residual oil have been used. Fuel gases range from natural gas (essentially methane) to low-heating-value gases such as produced by gasification of coal or heavy liquids, or as by-product gases from blast furnaces. Most gas turbines today are installed with dual- or multi-fuel capability to take advantage of changes in cost and availability of various fuels. Increased capability to burn high-hydrogen-content fuel gas has also been demonstrated, and the ability to operate on 100% hydrogen for zero carbon dioxide emissions is under development.

The story of Westinghouse gas turbine experience lists the many "firsts" achieved during the more than 50 years prior to the sale of the Power Generation Business Unit to Siemens, AG in 1998. As indicated below, the history actually begins with the successful development of the first fully US-designed jet engine during World War II. The first industrial gas turbine installation took place in 1948 with the installation of a 2000 hp W21 at Mississippi River Fuel Corp. gas compression station at Wilmar, Arkansas, USA.

== Early history ==
Westinghouse's history in the industrial and electric power steam turbine industry dates back to the late 1800s and early 1900s. The steam turbine manufacturing plant in Lester, PA was built in 1917-1919 and greatly expanding the company's manufacturing capacity. "The South Philadelphia Works" become a key part of the original Westinghouse Electric Company's industrial complex, complementing other large factories in East Pittsburgh, PA, and Hamilton, Ontario.

Westinghouse history with gas turbines began in the early 1940s with the contract signed in 1943 with the US Navy Bureau of Aeronautics to develop the first US-designed jet engine]. An outcome of this was the establishment in 1945 of the Aviation Gas Turbine Division, with headquarters in Kansas City, Kansas, until it closed in 1960.

During the late 1940s, Westinghouse began applying its gas turbine technology to industrial land-based prime movers. A summary of the early applications can be found in an ASME paper presented by Westinghouse engineers at the 1994 ASME International Gas Turbine Conference in the Hague. It is entitled "Evolution of Heavy-Duty Power Generation and Industrial Gas Turbines in the United States" and it also provides a summary of the Westinghouse gas turbine technology development through the mid-1990s. The following compilation is based on information in that ASME paper as well as other sources as cited, and upon personal accounts of Westinghouse engineers who had direct experience or close connections to the material presented.

=== Early Land-Based Applications ===
Westinghouse's experience with land-based gas turbines started as early as 1945 with the development of a 2000 hp (~1500 kW) gas turbine generator set, the W21. It had a thermal efficiency of 18% (LHV). The first application of the W21 in an industrial setting was in 1948 as a gas-compressor drive installed at the Mississippi River Fuel Corp. facility located at Wilmar, Arkansas. Reports have it that this was the first industrial gas turbine in the world to accumulate 100,000 hours of operation before it was retired.

By 1948, Westinghouse also built an experimental 4000 hp gas turbine-driven locomotive with the Baldwin Company (Chester, PA) that used two of these units. Initial operation was on the Union Pacific Railroad burning distillate fuel oil. Later, operation was on the Pittsburgh and Lake Eire Railroad using residual oil fuel.

The vast majority of the early applications of Westinghouse land-based gas turbines were for industrial mechanical drives in the petrochemical industry, both in the US and abroad.

For industrial "total energy" applications, the important factor was that gas turbines, combined with heat recovery boilers, offered a higher power-to-steam ratio than the traditional back-pressure steam turbines used to supply both power and process steam. So, gas turbines were put to use for combined heat and power by the petrochemical industry, working hand-in-hand with companies like Westinghouse, well before the word "cogeneration" entered the modern lingo some 30 years later.

Westinghouse received acknowledgment for its pioneering work in the unique application of a W201 installed at U.S. Steelworks in Chicago (1960). The engine was used to drive a 12,500 scfm fan to blow air into a blast furnace, and the design requirement was to use blast furnace exhaust gas as its fuel. The engine was modified so that all compressor discharge could be removed and fed to an external burner, from which products of combustion were returned to drive the turbine. Typically, blast furnace gas has a heating value of less than 100 Btu/scf, one-tenth of that of natural gas.

== Power generation applications ==
In 1952, West Texas Utilities, Stockton, TX, helped pioneer power generation application of gas turbines with the installation of a Westinghouse model W81, rated at 5000 kW. That was followed by a second W81 in 1954 (possibly 1958 based on a second source). Both units were used in continuous (base load) operation and the exhaust heat from the second unit was used to heat feedwater for a steam boiler at the site. In 1959, it was integrated with a fired boiler to form a "combined cycle" (gas and steam) power generating system. Five years later, in 1964, the same utility installed the first pre-engineered combined cycle power plant at its San Angelo, TX, power station. The Westinghouse gas turbine used for that application was a supercharged model W301, nominally rated at 25 MW. The rating on the steam turbine was 85 MW, for an overall combined cycle plant output of about 110 MW, and the thermal efficiency achieved was more than 39%, the record for gas-fired power plants in the US for quite some time.

The W301, the first Westinghouse direct-drive (3600RPM) unit, was the immediate predecessor of the model W501, introduced in 1967/68 with an initial rating of 40 MW (ISO/gas). (Note: some ratings listed in early publications used NEMA site conditions, i.e., 1000 ft elevation and 85 °F (29 °C), which reduces power output by 7.5% below that at ISO (sea level, 15 °C (59 °F) conditions.))

In 1967, Westinghouse supplied a 15 MW W191 pre-packaged gas turbine generator for a pioneering on-site industrial combined heat and power (CHP) or "cogeneration" application. The Southern California Edison Company (SCE) partnered with the Garden State Paper Company (GSP) to install and operate an on-site gas-turbine generator and heat recovery system to supply all the energy needs of a patented de-inking process to produce clean newsprint from used newspapers.

This unique early example of a "total-energy" system provided the operating flexibility, operating economics, site compatibility, and reliability to make it the ideal solution for both partners. SCE supplied both electricity and heat energy while GSP enjoyed the advantage of low cost, reliable on-site energy located at the process plant. The gas turbine generator was electrically tied to the SCE grid, which took the excess power generated. Henry Vogt Co. supplied the fired heat recovery boiler with a standby forced draft fan for backup duty. The plant went commercial in January 1967.

=== Dow Chemical's early venture into gas turbines ===
The first five production W501 engines were installed from 1968 to 1971 to supply power and steam at Dow Chemical facilities in Texas and Louisiana. The fact that Dow had previously installed four W301 units at its Texas Division, Freeport, TX, was key to their decision to go ahead with the follow-on orders for the larger W501 units.

In fact, the prototype supercharged W301 installed at Freeport, TX in 1965 was Dow's first venture into gas turbines for on-site power generation, and Westinghouse remained a major supplier of Dow's gas turbines for years to come.

The first W501A installed by Dow Chemical at its Freeport, TX, complex in 1968 was supercharged to enhance performance and available exhaust energy. Small "helper" steam turbine, coupled to generator was used for starting the gas turbine. In early applications, Dow typically used gas turbine exhaust as pre-heated "air" for fully fired boilers. Supercharging fans provided flow to boilers (via bypass duct) in event of gas turbine outage.

=== Salt Grass Combined Cycle – a major milestone ===
Although not built as a Dow-owned facility on Dow property, the 300 MW Salt Grass Combined Cycle plant, using 4xW501 units (1xW501A, 3xW501AA), was built as a dedicated power supply for Dow's Freeport, TX, expanding operations. The plant was designed, built and owned by Power Systems Engineering (PSE) in 1970-1972. (PSE was later incorporated into DESTEC Energy after being acquired by Dow in 1989. DESTEC later morphed into Dynegy a major independent power generating company.) Unlike most industrial generating plants, there was to be no process steam requirement for the Salt Grass plant; all output from the plant was to be in the form of electric energy. The design objective was to use the largest gas turbines available and, based on prior experience, to use unfired heat recovery boilers for operating simplicity and improved reliability. All steam was used to drive 4 identical 25 MW steam turbines coupled to the gas turbines at the outboard end of the generators (which in turn were mounted on the cold compressor-end of the rotor). The plant comprised four separate single-shaft combined cycle units for maximum operating flexibility. It also included a start-up boiler to enable the steam turbines to be used to start the gas turbines.

Construction of the Salt Grass plant began in January, 1970 and the first GT unit was operational 12 months later, according to a joint PSE/Dow paper presented at the time. Westinghouse records show that he fourth GT was in commercial operation early in 1972, so the entire plant was completed in just over two years.

PSE was founded by two ex-Westinghouse engineers from the Houston field sales office, Tom McMichael (Sales Engineer) and Al Smith (District Manager). As such they both had a unique relationship with Dow and had been instrumental in previous Westinghouse business with Dow. According to a paper co-authored by Al Smith in 1971, the idea for the plant was conceived by PSE and Dow in early 1969. The Salt Grass plant was their first venture after they decided to go out on their own.

== The blackout of 1965 ==
The Great Northeast Blackout took place on November 9, 1965. Although the actual culprit behind the massive power outage was found to be a single faulty relay at a transmission station in Ontario, Canada, the "cascade" or domino effect on downstream trunk lines caused the entire CANUSE system from Canada, through Buffalo, NY and to the east coast from New York City to Maine to fail in 15 minutes.

An important ramification of this event was recognition of the need to strengthen the grid and improve system restart capabilities. Electric utilities throughout the U.S. were mandated by their regional "Reliability Councils" (e.g. NERC for the northeast) to increase their system reserve margins by installing a certain percentage of their overall capacity in the form of smaller localized fast-start generating units, much of them with "black start" capability to assure that large plants and grids could be restarted in the event of another major outage. The event contributed to the birth of the modern gas turbine industry in the U.S.

Although only anecdotal, it has been said that there was an increase in the birthrate in the northeastern US and parts of Canada during the summer of 1966.

=== A Wave of Gas Turbine Installations ===
The result was a wave of gas turbine generator installations, chosen as the fastest and most economical way to meet the mandate for reliability and to meet the steady growth of demand. (Ergo, the Westinghouse CTSD "The Economic Choice" marketing campaign at the time.) Annual utility purchases of additional units became a routine event as long as the peak load demand continued to increase.

Based on comments from Westinghouse CTSD sales veterans, large orders of multiple units were often taken over the phone, as repeat customers raced to obtain their annual allotment. Tracking the regional and national peak demand curves became the main tool to planners who had to forecast the market and set the shop "load plan". (This writer wonders whether the GT suppliers of that time developed "reserve agreements" as was the practice adopted during another boom period, 30 years later.)

Accordingly, most gas turbines installed in the US during the late 1960s and early 1970s were applied as simple cycle peaking units ("peakers"), intended for system backup and intermittent use, and installed to maintain adequate reserve margin.

Importantly, the early 1970s also witnessed the success of the early combined cycle plants and, as the peaking market started to level off, and, for the time being, this helped sustain the U.S. utility market for large gas turbines.

One report has it that the demand for gas turbines in the U.S. hit almost 9 GW in 1969, a 30-fold increase over the total of 300 MW sold in 1961. (The chart below shows that market for larger units (>20 MW) peaked at around 7 GW.)

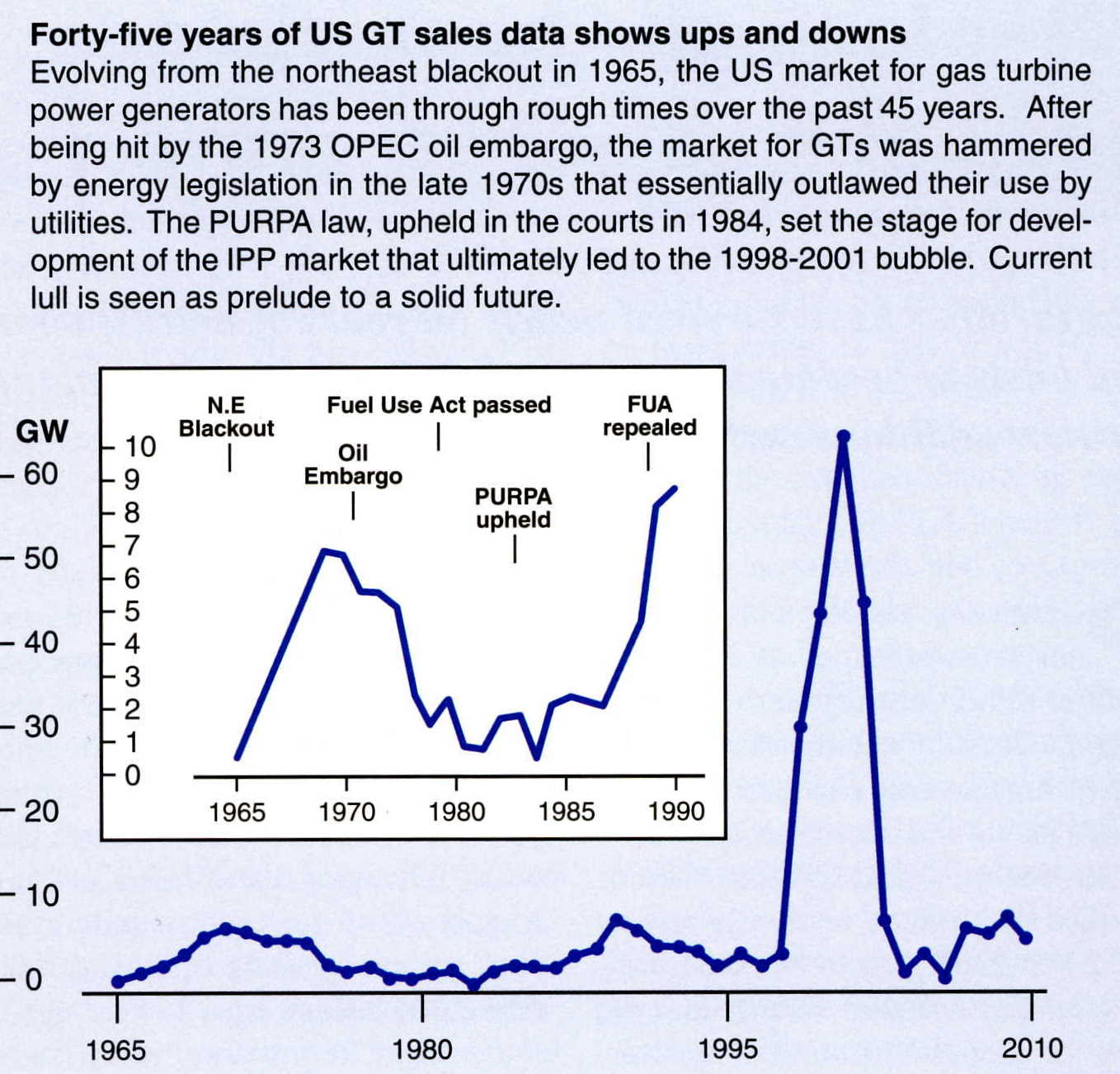
US Gas Turbine Market Data - source: Gas Turbine World Magazine May–June 2011 (with permission)

No wonder that forecasts for future market growth were so optimistic. At the start of 1970, Turbine Topics, the internal newsletter of the Small Steam & Gas Turbine Division (predecessor of the Gas Turbine Division) contained this statement from the Marketing Department: "The sum total of all this tells us that the fantastic growth of the 60s will perpetuate into the 70s". (Source: Personal collection.)

However, by 1971/1972 the market had already shown signs of weakening, and, unfortunately, subsequent global events had a lot to say about whether that rosy forecast would come true.

US gas turbine market from 1965 to 1990, with forecast to 2000, (at right) shows how the northeast blackout of 1965 accelerated the growth of electric utility market for gas turbines in the US. Later events, most notably the 1973 Arab Israeli war, followed by the 1974 OPEC oil embargo and the U.S. Fuel Use Act of 1978, caused a steep decline. A strong recovery followed with the rise of the Independent Power Producer ("IPP") cogeneration market under the Public Utility Regulatory Policy Act (PURPA), upheld by the US Supreme

== Gas turbine manufacturing plant at Round Rock, TX ==
Based on the surge of gas turbine business in the late 1960s, Westinghouse (following the example of market leader and archrival General Electric) decided to build a modern new gas turbine manufacturing plant at Round Rock, TX, near Austin. However, by the time that the plant went into operation around 1972, the US market for gas turbines was about to collapse due to the impact of the 1973 Arab-Israeli war and subsequent fears of fuel supply instability due to the OPEC oil embargo (see market data chart, above). Also, unlike GE's Greeneville, SC plant, the new Round Rock factory was not built as a standalone plant with full manufacturing capabilities, as already existed in Lester. Major components were shipped from Lester (and other suppliers) for final assembly at Round Rock.

As the market collapsed (see chart), Westinghouse management reduced the surplus of shop space allocated to gas turbines. Since Round Rock could not survive on its own, it was ultimately abandoned as a gas turbine manufacturing facility in 1976. Other large rotating equipment operations moved in, such as those of the E. Pittsburgh DC products and Buffalo Large Motors Division. Ultimately, the large motors operations of Westinghouse were sold to Taiwan Electric Co. (TECO) and the plant is now owned by TECO-Westinghouse and is used to serve its wind generator business.

== Technological developments ==
GE and Pratt & Whitney entered the market with their packaged units. These proved to be very quick to install and highly efficient, and gained a lot of attention.

The key to lowering $/kW was to increase engine power rating. This was achieved in two ways: First, be able to offer a larger unit than the competition. Then, once the basic frame size is set, incremental rating growth can be achieved by increasing turbine firing temperature.

=== Evolution of the W501 model series ===
Following the introduction of the W501A in 1967/68, Westinghouse technology continued to evolve as turbine inlet temperatures increased by means of improved internal cooling and advanced metallurgy, and pressure ratios increased with improved compressor designs. Over the period from 1968 to 1975, the W501 progressed from the W501A (~40 MW), W501AA (~60 MW), W501B (~80 MW) and the W501D (~95 MW).

The next major redesign was the W501D5, introduced in 1981, initially at a rating of 96.5 MW (growing to 107 MW (gross) ca. 1985). In 1995, the W501D5A upgrade was offered with a rating of 120 MW.

In the late-1980 and early-1990s, Westinghouse introduced the advanced 501F, initially rated at 150 MW (nominal). The first commercial start-up date for the 501F was in 1993 (four units, installed at the Florida Power & Light Lauderdale Station repowering project).

A similar technology evolution path was followed for the smaller geared model W251 (see referenced ASME paper by Scalzo, et al.) shows how that model actually led the way to some of the technology steps taken in the evolution of the W501.

(See Scalzo, et al. for tables showing evolution of both the Westinghouse model W501 and W251 gas turbines.).

The first 501G was installed at Lakeland Electric's McIntosh station and was first synchronized to the grid in April, 1999.

=== The W251 model series evolves along with W501 ===
As mentioned above, the W251 model series followed an evolutionary path from the venerable W191 (ranging from 15 MW to around 18 MW over product life, with more than 180 units sold) and was introduced in 1967, just prior to the W501. The W251A, at a nominal rating of 20 MW, was the first to feature cooling of first-stage turbine vane and other stationary parts. In 1985, when the W251B10 was rated at approximately 45 MW, the W251 product line charter was moved to Westinghouse Canada. The W251, at half the rating of the W501, was popular for smaller applications, and about 230 units were sold. The final design before being dropped from the product line ca. 1998, the W251B12 was a 50 MW class gas turbine, built at Westinghouse Hamilton, Ont. plant. With gear driven generator, the W251 could be used in 50 Hz as well as 60 Hz applications.

== Design features ==
From the earliest of its heavy-duty gas turbine designs, Westinghouse has retained time proven mechanical design features that have endured for more than 50 years and have been emulated by other manufacturers.

Note the cold-end generator drive feature, original with Westinghouse and later adopted by others (including the industry leader in its own F-class design). This is ideal for heat recovery applications and avoids the need for a high-temperature flexible drive coupling in the exhaust end (characteristic of earlier designs of others).

Also, the two-bearing rotor design avoided the need for a high-temperature center bearing buried in the hot section of the engine (also characteristic of earlier designs of others).

Not mentioned on the list is the patented tangential exhaust casing struts designed to maintain rotor alignment.

== Packaged gas turbine power plants ==
Westinghouse pioneered in the development of pre-engineered packaged gas turbine generator power plants, both with the EconoPac, a complete modularized simple cycle package, and with the PACE combined cycle plant.

=== The Westinghouse EconoPac packaged GT power plant ===
As the gas turbine engine technology evolved, so did ideas on how to best package all of it auxiliary supporting systems. In addition to the gas turbine itself, the scope of supply included the generator/exciter, a starting motor, the mechanical and electrical auxiliaries, and the inlet and exhaust systems.

In 1962 Westinghouse introduced the concept of a pre-engineered packaged gas-turbine power generating unit with the W171 (12,000 kW) unit sold to the City of Houma Light & Power Co. (LA). This early application established the basis for the "EconoPac" simple cycle packaged plant which became the standard scope of supply for Westinghouse simple cycle gas turbine units to this day.

The Westinghouse EconoPac includes the factory-assembled skid-mounted gas turbine engine, generator and exciter, starting package, mechanical (lube oil, hydraulics, pneumatics, etc.)and electrical/control auxiliary skids, inlet system (filter and ducting), exhaust system (ducting, stack and silencer), all coolers, fans, pumps, valves, and interconnecting piping. Enclosures for all skids are also included in the standard scope of supply. Typically, the EconoPac defined the gas turbine scope of supply for extended scope plants (cogeneration, combined cycle, etc.) as well as a simple cycle unit.

Full gas turbine power plant would arrive at site in pre-packaged modules for quick field assembly. The glycol cooler was used for hydrogen-cooled generator, which was standard scope before availability of large air-cooled generators for the application. Air-to-air cooler next to exhaust stack is for cooling of rotor cooling air, a feature of Westinghouse gas turbine packages.

=== Westinghouse PACE Combined Cycle Power Plants ===
As in the case of the simple cycle gas turbine pre-engineered and packaged plant, Westinghouse also pioneered with the idea of a pre-engineered combined cycle plant. Around 1970, a design group was organized under the leadership of Paul Berman, Manager PACE Engineering, and the Marketing and Sales team went into high gear with an all-out promotion campaign.

A thermal cycle concept was developed around the use of two 75 MW W501B gas turbines and a new 100 MW single case steam turbine specifically designed for the application. The plant was called the PACE Plant (for Power At Combined Efficiencies) and the first design was dubbed the PACE 260 to reflect the nominal power rating of the plant.

The PACE design was geared towards the "intermediate load" market (between peaking and base load) where there was a growing need to install capacity that was more economical to install than base load (coal and nuclear plants) and more economical to operate than simple cycle gas turbines. The equipment had to also be flexible enough to be able to withstand the stresses of daily start-and-stop operating duty. Special provisions were made throughout the design to accommodate this cycling mode of operation.

The PACE 260 concept (and later the upgraded PACE 320) was captured in this image depicting the thermodynamic cycle behind the plant design.

As can be seen the original concept included supplemental (duct) firing of the two-pressure heat recover boilers, which were a vertical flow design configuration. The basic configuration was described as a 2-on-1 design, meaning that two gas turbines produced steam to feed one steam turbine.

Supplemental firing was utilized to increase steam production so as to fill the 100 MW single-case steam turbine. In the initial design, approximately 20% of the fuel input was fired in the duct burner. Without supplemental firing, there is typically adequate energy in the exhaust of the gas turbine to generate enough steam to produce about 50% of the gas turbine power, or, in this case, only 75 MW.

In this way, the original PACE plant design had built-in steam turbine capacity to enable the water/steam side of the plant to remain essentially the same as the gas turbine power rating evolved through to the 100 MW-plus W501D5, when the rating of the plant was 300 MW without supplemental firing.

The PACE 260 was initially offered with a heat rate of about 8,100 Btu/kWh (42% efficiency) LHV on natural gas fuel. The upgraded (ca. 1980) PACE 320 based on the W501D, had a nominal 300 MW rating and a heat rate of 7,530 Btu/kWh (45% efficiency) LHV on natural gas fuel.

PACE plants were available either with full-enclosure buildings to cover all but the heat recovery boilers, or for outdoor installation, with the EconoPacs providing the necessary enclosures for the gas turbines and their auxiliaries.

For the early PACE plants Westinghouse designed and manufactured the heat recovery boilers at the Heat Transfer Division in Lester. Later plants incorporated heat recovery units supplied by subcontractors.

An installation list of PACE plants shows units sold and installed as of the mid-1980s. Note that several of the installations included two PACE 260 plants (mirror image plant designs were available for those cases). These were called PACE 520 plants. It is also noted that nearly half of the plants were built in Mexico, one PACE 260 and two PACE 520s.

The first PACE 260 was installed at the Public Service Co. of Oklahoma’s Comanche station, in Lawton, OK, entering commercial in 1973. Based on published information, time from commitment to the design program (Jan. 1970) to commercial operation was less than three years. Reference is made to ASME paper 74-GT-109, by Paul A. Berman, Westinghouse Manager of PACE Engineering, which describes the PACE concept in detail and documents the construction and start-up of the Comanche plant. Since its installation, some 40 years ago, the plant went through major boiler modification (seen in photo below), several engine performance upgrades and has operated for many years as the most economical plant on PSO's system. (This writer recalls being told that the initial price for natural gas at the site was $0.26 per million Btu!) As of this writing, the plant is still in use, albeit not for continuous duty.

The three early PACE plants sold to CFE (PACE 260 at Palacio Gomez and PACE 520 at Dos Bocas) involved an order for six (6) W501B gas turbines and represented the largest order placed by CFE up to that time. The story has it that the order was received on a Good Friday (ca. 1973?) after a very contentious competition with another major US supplier who used some rather "creative" ways to enhance plant performance. Everyone involved in the negotiation was anxious to get home for Easter, but not so anxious that they left before getting the order. The final plant on the list was built for CFE at Tula, Mexico, as a phased-construction project, where the four (4) W501D EconoPac units were shipped and installed on an ASAP basis, in simple cycle mode, to meet an energy emergency during 1979-1981. The HRSGs and steam turbine portion of each plant was added later and the exhaust stacks were removed. (Photo below is of artist's concept of converted plant. The four W501D EonoPacs were already in place at time of photo.)

== The rise of US cogeneration and independent power markets ==
As shown earlier the U.S. market for gas turbines enjoyed a substantial boom for simple cycle peaking units following the Northeast Blackout of 1965. And that, in turn, led to the advent, around 1970, of the popular pre-engineered combined cycle plant, such as the Westinghouse PACE and GE STAG (STeam And Gas) plants which enjoyed much early success in the early 1970s. There was much promise sustained growth in the gas turbine business.

The breakout of the Arab-Israeli war of 1973 changed all of that.

Following the war, Arab members of the Organization of Petroleum Exporting Countries (OPEC) imposed an embargo against the United States, and other countries in Europe and South Africa, in retaliation for the U.S. decision to re-supply the Israeli military. The almost immediate result of the embargo was severe shortages in target countries such as the US, and a steep rise in the global price, of oil and oil products. The U.S. had become increasingly dependent on imported oil and the embargo caused a major disruption of the national economy. First the Nixon administration, then the short-lived administration of Gerald Ford, and, finally, that of Jimmy Carter, all developed plans to increase domestic production and reduce the use of imported oil.

At the same time, during the Jimmy Carter administration, there was a strong concerted move in the natural gas industry for deregulation, and a supply shortage of pipeline gas was created to punctuate their position.

A direct result of all of this tumult in the energy supply chain was Jimmy Carter's National Energy Plan of 1977 and a declaration of Energy Independence. Legislation was introduced in the U.S. Congress aimed at establishing strict prohibitions and regulations aimed at achieving reductions in the use of both imported oil and natural gas. (This was written at time when there was a glut of both oil and natural gas in the U.S.)

At the time there was clearly a strong pro-coal leaning in Congress, and coal, as the most abundant domestic energy source in the US, was being promoted as offering the way to achieve independence from imported oil. "King Coal" was in the driver's seat, and the future of coal-fired power generation seemed assured in spite of the environmental laws and regulations that had been passed only a few years earlier.

After months and months of debate the National Energy Act of 1978 was passed and proudly signed into law by Jimmy Carter.

Two of the major provisions of the new energy legislation had profound impacts on the gas turbine industry:

- First, The Fuel Use Act (FUA), which, among other things, prohibited the use of oil and natural gas as fuel for new base load power plants. Only "alternative fuels" – i.e., coal and coal-derived fuels – were allowed for that purpose. (Again, in today's environment, can anyone imagine ??). Peaking units and intermediate-load combined cycle power plants (<3500 hours per year operation) were exempt from the prohibitions of the Fuel Use Act, as were "cogeneration facilities".
- Second, The Public Utility Regulatory Policies Act (PURPA), which had a lot to do with the deregulation of the electric utility industry and, among other things, established rules requiring electric utilities to purchase power from non-utility generators ("NUG"). Such NUGs, however, also had to deliver some amount of thermal energy to an industrial process plant, i.e. the generating unit had to be "qualified" as a cogeneration facility. Thereby, such a facility was defined as a qualifying facility or "QF".

These new energy laws were about to have great impact on the U.S. gas turbine market.

=== New markets slow to grow ===
As shown in US Combustion Turbine Market curve above, the years immediately following the passage the FUA and PURPA saw little new domestic business for gas turbines as much legal wrangling was taken place around the country. In fact, 1982 was probably the worst year ever in terms of orders placed for large gas turbines in the US. The prototype W501D5 was sold to Gulf States Utilities in 1981 and two other W501D5 EconoPacs were sold to Puget Sound Power & Light Co. Dow Chemical, whose expanding on-site power industrial generation facilities in Texas and Louisiana were not affected by the new laws, purchased several units in 1980/’81. That was about it for new unit sales for Westinghouse CTSD until 1983.

The IPP market was awaiting the outcome of government legal action as several state Public Utility Commissions refused to implement the PURPA regulations, claiming that they were unconstitutional. It wasn't until 1982, in FERC v. Mississippi PUC, when the Supreme Court decided in favor of the Federal Energy Regulatory Administration (FERC) and upheld the law.

This turned out to be the catalyst that enabled the IPP market take off.

Following this, Westinghouse CTSD participated in two early IPP cogeneration projects that helped to bridge the gap and persist despite few domestic utility orders.

=== Capital Cogeneration ===
In 1983, H.B. Zachry Co. of San Antonio obtained a contract from Capital Cogeneration Company Ltd (a joint venture, including Central and Southwest Power Co., to design and build a 450 MW combined cycle/cogeneration plant near Bayport (a.k.a. Pasadena), Texas, south of Houston. This was one of the earliest "PURPA Plants" to be built in the U.S. under the new PURPA regulations.

Westinghouse CTSD obtained the order from H.B. Zachry Co. for 3xW501D5 EconoPacs for integration into the combined cycle plant (HRSGs supplied by Henry Vogt Co.) The plant exported power for sale to Houston Power and Light and steam to a nearby process plant owned by Celanese Chemical (the "steam host"). Thanks to excellent field sales relationship with Zachry and CSW, this plant was essentially an all-Westinghouse plant, including the 150 MW-class steam turbine generator and all power electrics. Today the plant is known as Clear Lake Cogeneration, and is owned by Calpine.

=== Texas City Cogeneration ===
The second major IPP project in which Westinghouse CTSD participated was developed ca. 1985 by Internorth Natural Gas of Omaha, NE. The plant location, Texas City, TX, is about 35 miles southeast of the Capital Cogeneration project site, above.

Internorth's concept was to use PURPA IPP cogeneration QF rules to build a 400 MW cogeneration plant that would sell the power to Houston Power and Light and export steam to a nearby Dow Chemical (then Union Carbide) plant. At the same time, the plant, which would be exempt from the FUA, would be an excellent new power generation customer for Internorth's fuel gas.

With little other business available, a determined Marketing effort at CTSD was intensely focused on this negotiation. Since this was taking place at the same time as a serious 4th stage turbine blade design issue with the W501D5, an engineering team led by CT Engine Engineering Manager, Augie Scalzo, was also assigned to satisfy Internorth that the design was sound.

Westinghouse did obtain the order for 3xW501D5 EconoPacs to be installed at the plant called Texas City Cogeneration. The three units included the last W501D5 built at the Lester factory before it was closed in 1986 and the first two engines built by MHI under a new business arrangement with the long-time Westinghouse licensee.

Shortly after the Texas City plant was built, Internorth merged with Houston Natural Gas, and moved its headquarters to Houston. Shortly after that, the joint company changed its name to ENRON.

Today, the Texas City Plant is owned by Calpine.

Other early PURPA-plant projects in which Westinghouse CTSD participated are described later as part of the story of the relocation of CTSD to Orlando, FL.

=== Dow/Destec IGCC at Plaquemine, LA ===
The idea of burning coal – some derivative of it, be it liquid or gas – in a gas turbine gained considerable attention and government support during the late 1970s and into the 1980s. Synthetic gas or liquid fuels made from coal were considered "alternative fuels", encouraged under the Fuel Use Act, and the development of various such fuels was being heavily supported by the US Department of Energy.

In fact, Westinghouse was already working under government contract to develop its own coal gasification process. A process development unit was built at Waltz Mill, PA and operated by the Westinghouse R&D Center. To show its commitment to the commercialization of the technology, Westinghouse formed the Synthetic Fuels Division around 1983. (SFD, as it was called, was disbanded around 1987, as the DOE contract expired, and the rights to the process were sold to Kellogg-Rust Engineering. The gasification process became known as the KRW process and was continued to be marketed by KRW Inc.)

In the meantime, Dow Chemical was looking into how it might utilize large lignite deposits in Texas to reduce its dependence on natural gas to fuel its on-site power generating facilities.

To implement this back-up energy strategy, Dow undertook development of its own coal gasification process (later to be called "E-Gas") and pursued government support from the Synthetic Fuels Corporation, established in 1980 for the purpose of nurturing a synthetic fuel (i.e. coal-derived gas or liquid) industry in the U.S. as part of "Project Independence".

In the meantime, Dow and Westinghouse engineers worked toward converting the two new W501D5 gas turbines that were installed at the Dow Plaquemine, LA complex in 1982/83. As a first step, in 1981, they undertook on the conversion of an old W191 located at the Dow, Freeport, Tx complex to burn low-BTU (approx. 200 Btu/scf vs. 1000 Btu/scf for natural gas.) This gas was to be produced by a prototype proprietary gasifier being designed and built by Dow. They specified that the gas turbine was to be modified to be able to supply compressed air for the gasification process, and it also had to operate on natural gas (at least for startup and shut down).

Following a successful 15 MW demonstration, Dow proceeded to build a full-scale oxygen-blown gasifier sized to supply the two W501D5s at Plaquemine, LA with 80% of their fuel energy, and Westinghouse was given the go-ahead to design and manufacture the new fuel nozzles. Since the gas turbines were an integral part of existing plant operations, the specification was to assure dual-fuel capability, so that the unit could easily revert to natural gas when the gasifier was not in operation.

Westinghouse CTSD combustion engineers had earlier worked under subcontract on the above-mentioned DOE coal gasification contract to demonstrate low-Btu gas combustion on W501B components. Later, that work led to the design of W501D5 combustor baskets to incorporate features (e.g., a larger-diameter head end) to make them adaptable to use of low-Btu fuel gas. So the Plaquemine units were essentially "syngas ready", and were readily modified.

The conversion of the two 100 MW+ gas turbines at Plaquemine to burn gasified coal created the largest integrated-gasification combined cycle or "IGCC", in the world, and was very successful for Dow. The Dow (or more accurately LGTI - Louisiana Gasification Technology, Inc.) Synfuels Corporation contract continued to subsidize the production of synthetic fuel gas from coal at the Plaquemine site for about 10–15 years before the subsidy expired.

Later Dow (Destec Energy) was able to participate in the DOE-supported repowering of the Public Service of Indiana Wabash power station with an advanced F-class gas turbine burning gas produced by an "E-Gas" gasifier. Unfortunately, Westinghouse did not get the order for the gas turbine from Public Service Co. of Indiana, and the project used a GE Frame 7F. Today the Wabash gasification system is operating on a commercial basis, selling coal-derived gas to the 250 MW Wabash combined cycle power plant.

Dow never implemented conversion of their own power generating facilities at any of their Gulf Coast locations. Natural gas remained plentiful, and, in recent years, has become a cheaper fuel than it was 30 years ago.

== Concordville (1979–1987) ==
From around 1972 through 1979, the headquarters of Gas Turbine Division (a.k.a. Gas Turbine Systems Division and Combustion Turbine Systems Division), had been located in rented space in the renovated Baldwin-Lima-Hamilton Building (vintage 1920s) in Eddystone, PA, just south of the Westinghouse Lester factory. The gas turbine division operations occupied the top 4 floors of the 7-floor office building (known as The "A" Building), while the rest of the building was occupied by Westinghouse Steam Turbine Engineering and other support groups.

As noted earlier, these years at "A-Building" as the BLH building became known, saw many ups and downs for Westinghouse gas turbines. Around 1977, just as the U.S. market for new units was drying up (but the Saudi market had just peaked, see later) it was decided that CTSD should have a new headquarters building of its own, and a new world-class gas turbine development lab.

Groundbreaking for new CTSD headquarters took place in 1977/78 and the facility was fully occupied by the summer of 1979. (Bob Kirby, then Chairman and CEO, attended a dedication ceremony at the site in June, 1978.) The selected site was at Concordville, PA, about 15 miles northwest of the Lester plant.

The headquarters for Westinghouse Electric's Combustion Turbine Systems Division (CTSD) in Concordville, Pennsylvania. The world-class development laboratory at left background featured rigs for component testing at engine operating conditions, including large indirectly fired air preheater to provide heated non-vitiated (i.e., full O2 content) air for combustion testing.

For 8 years, 1979–1987, the Concordville site was where CTSD ran its business, serving both domestic and international markets, conducted R&D with both internal and external funding (from EPRI, DOE and NASA), developed engine and plant designs, managed numerous projects and grew its service business as the most profitable part of its operation.

=== The Ready Source of Power ===
Around the time of the move to Concordville, CTSD also launched its "Westinghouse Combustion Turbines The Ready Source of Power" campaign which highlighted the newly introduced W501D5 gas turbine, advances in technology, such as the ability to burn coal-derived gas and liquid fuels, and the importance of planned maintenance on achieving high reliability and availability of gas turbine plants.

In fact, by the mid-1980s all of Westinghouse Power Generation took on a strategic refocusing of its business from the traditional emphasis on new unit applications to aggressive development of the service sector. Although "growing the fleet" was still an essential ingredient to the growth of the gas turbine service business, the lack of new-unit opportunities at the time dictated at least a temporary shift in emphasis. CTSD developed the "Total Service" program, promoting capabilities in outage management and availability improvement programs. "Total Service – More Than Just Parts" became the mantra. (This writer recalls the National Sales Meeting in Orlando ca. 1983, prior to completion of the new office building at the Quadrangle, and the theme of the meeting was "We’re in the Service Now". The entire Steam Turbine Generator Marketing operation was reorganized around the operating plant market.)

Note that the Development Center (commonly referred to as "The Lab") was completed in 1976, while CTSD was still located in at A-Building, Eddystone. According to a Westinghouse brochure, "The Lab" was capable of full-scale testing of compressor, combustor, turbine, and auxiliary system components over the entire range of operating conditions (exhaust system designs were developed at reduced scale). The lab included a high-bay area that could accommodate a full-size gas turbine for testing and development purposes, as well as a large conference room and offices for the managers, engineers and technicians who operated the facility. It was sized to enable full-scale combustion testing, which required a large, a jet-derived gas turbine driven air compressor. It also required a gas-fired heater to simulate combustor inlet conditions.

CTSD operations at Concordville grew and ebbed over the near decade of The Concordville Years. At one point (ca 1981/82 per CTSD employee telephone directory), CTSD employment reached a peak level of around 600 people. But financial performance did not support such growth, and there was a major downsizing in the 1985-1987 time frame prior to the relocation to Orlando to be incorporated at Westinghouse Power Generation World Headquarters. Only about 100 CTSD professionals and management remained at the time to make the trip south in the spring of 1987.

=== Changes in Westinghouse - MHI Relationship ===
(Note: This section is based primarily on personal recollections of one of the key engineers involved in the episode.)

A significant development that took place near the close of the Concordville years involved a major change in the relationship between Westinghouse CTSD and its long-time licensee, Mitsubishi Heavy Industries (MHI). Many credit this development as a key event in Westinghouse's long term survival (and MHI's?) as a major participant in the gas turbine industry, and the key to the Siemens acquisition of the business ten years later.

By the mid-1980s, it had already been decided that gas turbine manufacturing operations at the Lester, PA plant would cease by the end of 1986, and, also, that manufacturing of the popular W501D5 engines would be outsourced from the MHI plant in Takasago, Japan. This plan enabled CTSD to put into place at least a temporary means of continuing doing business - to obtain and fulfill orders for large gas turbines as the US cogeneration and IPP markets were developing. (As noted earlier, the first MHI-built engines were installed at the Texas City Cogen plant. According to internal records, the total number of W501D5s purchased by Westinghouse from MHI was 10, as were the first four 501F engines, below.)

The next development in the Westinghouse-MHI relationship came in 1986 when MHI shared a study that indicated that the global market for its 50-Hz scaled version the Westinghouse gas turbines (called the MW701D) would soon see a strong return, and they proposed the joint development of a new advanced 50 Hz engine to be called the "701F". (GE was already developing its Frame 7F.) The 60 Hz design for the markets served by Westinghouse would follow.

Since Westinghouse's corporate support of advanced gas turbine development and design at that time was nil, Westinghouse agreed to supply key engine design engineering support (as specified by MHI) and MHI provided the funding to support the effort, as well as to manufacture the prototype engine. Joint conceptual design started in mid-1986 and, somewhere early in the effort, it was decided that the first engine should be the 60 Hz "501F" version of the design. (MHI would subsequently complete the scaling process for the 50 Hz design.) The new design provided both companies with the opportunity to incorporate some important design improvements and attributes that were not feasible to be back-engineered into existing W501D5/MW701D designs, but could readily be introduced into a new design.

Despite the reduction in work force at Westinghouse and the interruption caused by preparation for the move of the Combustion Turbine Operations to Orlando (announced in October, 1986) work progressed steadily on the new engine design. Westinghouse had agreed to take on about sixty percent of the design effort on the new engine, and the work effort continued with the actual move of the engine engineering staff in April, 1987 to Orlando. .Although many employees decided, for one reason or another, including many taking early retirement, to not make the move south, the joint development program with MHI greatly benefited from the decision of several of key engineers who agreed to delay their retirement, temporarily, move to Florida and continue to work on the program.

The joint design effort continued through June 1988 with major design reviews being held quarterly. Meeting sites for these reviews alternated between Orlando and Takasago, Japan. From start to finish, the total design effort spanned just 23 months and was completed on schedule. Based on the circumstances such as the move from Concordville, loss of key employees, cultural differences, language barriers and the distant site logistics, the project was considered to be an excellent example of engineering and management teamwork and a significant accomplishment for both Westinghouse and MHI.

The 501F program permanently changed the relationship between the two companies, giving each independent and royalty-free manufacturing and marketing rights to the new engine.

The prototype 501F engine was built and shop-tested at MHI's turbine factory and development center at Takasago in mid-1989. In 1990, Westinghouse secured an order for the first four 501F units, built in Takasago, from Florida Power and Light Co. for their Lauderdale Station Repowering project, which started operation in mid-1993. The contracted ISO rating of those units was 158 MW.

Essentially coincident with the start-up of the FP&L Lauderdale plant, Westinghouse announced to MHI that they would start development and production of an up-rated 501F, the 167 MW "FB", which resulted in another joint effort between Westinghouse and MHI. Again both parties put teams in place and the up-rated design was accomplished as scheduled. The first Westinghouse-built 501F was shipped from the Pensacola plant in October, 1995 for the Korea Electric Power Co. (KEPCO) project in Ulsan, Korea.

At about the same time, Westinghouse and MHI were well on their way toward the joint development of the steam-cooled 250 MW-class 501G engine. See below.

== Move to Orlando ==
The physical move south by Westinghouse Power Generation started in 1982 and initially was done to consolidate the non-manufacturing operations of the Steam Turbine Division located in the Philadelphia, PA area and the Large Rotating Apparatus Division (i.e. generators) located in the Pittsburgh, PA area. The selection of Orlando, FL as the new home for the Steam Turbine Generator Division came after a process of elimination of several other "neutral" locations. The story has it that Richmond, VA had been the first choice for the new Westinghouse Power Generation headquarters, but the ongoing legal issues between Westinghouse and a major Virginia-based utility over nuclear fuel contracts but a damper on that idea.

Westinghouse purchased a large tract of land called The Quadrangle located just across the road from the sprawling campus of what is now called the University of Central Florida and built a large new office building. Prior to moving into the new building, the Steam Turbine Generator Division headquarters was located in an abandoned shopping center.

=== On the move ===
CTSD (a.k.a. CTO - Combustion Turbine Operations) would be moving to Orlando to join the Steam Turbine Generator Division (STGD) operation which had moved south from Lester and E. Pittsburgh 4–5 years earlier. The actual move took place in April, 1987 when all of those making the move were to report to work at their new location at The Quadrangle, Orlando, Florida. In October, 1986 the long expected notice was received by employees:

Prior to the move, early in 1986, the newly formed Power Systems Business Unit management team, headquartered at the Energy Center in Monroeville, PA, and now in charge of Power Generation (as well as the Nuclear Energy segment), had formed a Power Generation Task Force. The objective was to better understand the future of the power generation industry, and how Westinghouse could best position itself to grow and prosper in it.

A renowned industry consultant was hired to conduct a market study, and it was then, finally, that the importance of gas-turbines to the future of power generation in the U.S. – if not worldwide – became appreciated. As indicated earlier, this had not been the general view of the old-guard power generation management, and Westinghouse had already started to execute its plan commonly known as "phased exit" from the gas turbine business.

The small group (under 100) that moved with CTO quickly grew through "Project Backfill". A substantial number of STGD engineers and managers, as well as many professionals and managers from nuclear projects and engineering operations, and, also, personnel from Westinghouse Canada, found new career opportunities in rebuilding the organization.

After moving to Orlando in 1987, CTO was incorporated into the Generation Technology Systems Division (GTSD). But his organization proved to be short-lived as Westinghouse Power Systems formed the Power Generation Business Unit, in 1988.

Just after the move, a promotional brochure was produced called: "On the Move", aimed at assuring customers, the rest of the industry, and employees, that Westinghouse was still in the gas turbine business.

It also told of another recent big change, i.e., reaching agreement with Mitsubishi Heavy Industries (MHI), a long-time Westinghouse licensee, to manufacture the W501D5. (While the W251 was still to be built at Westinghouse Canada, Hamilton works, the Lester plant closed in 1986.) According to the announcement in the brochure, Westinghouse CTO was to continue in the role of technology developers, system and plant designers, application engineers, marketers, project managers and service providers.

As it turned out, depending on MHI for shop space to supply Westinghouse's market needs did not work out very well, nor did it continue for very long. In 1991, PGBU management saw fit to end the agreement with MHI and to resurrect the Great North American Factory by using the Pensacola, FL plant for assembly of the W501D5. Other Westinghouse plants involved in the manufacture of Westinghouse gas turbines included those in Charlotte, NC, Hamilton, Ont., and Winston-Salem, NC.

=== Take A New Look At Westinghouse Combustion Turbines ===
Another big part of the advertising campaign following the move to Orlando was the theme: "Take a new look ... at Westinghouse Combustion Turbines". The message was clear. The marketplace had to be reassured that "engineering excellence and proven technology" along with "full customer service" were ongoing constants with Westinghouse, in spite of the major changes that had taken place.

In 1988, forty years after its first industrial gas turbine began operating, Westinghouse introduced a marketing theme: "Westinghouse – the new value in combustion turbines." The management team in Orlando distributed this message to industry media to communicate that the company remained active in the gas turbine business.

=== Bellingham and Sayreville: major cogen project milestones ===
Within a year after the move to Orlando, two additional major orders for-cogeneration projects were obtained to help restore Westinghouse's position in the marketplace. Two identical PACE 300 (2-W501D5 GT on 1-100 MW ST) power plants were ordered by Intercontinental Energy Corp., a family-owned private-power IPP development company located in Massachusetts.

These were the Bellingham (MA) and Sayreville (NJ) cogeneration projects, and they were instrumental in restoring confidence in Westinghouse's gas turbine business - to the outside world, to the new management of the Power Generation Business Unit, and to CTO employees.

From editor's personal recollection, the prime competition for the Bellingham and Sayreville project orders, after the customer had already broken off discussions with GE, was Fluor-Daniel Corp., which was offering Siemens/KWU V84.2 100 MW gas turbines.

In addition to some very effective negotiating skills on the part of Westinghouse, KWU's relative lack of 60 Hz experience was rumored to be a strong factor in the customer's decision to go with Westinghouse.

The Bellingham and Sayreville projects were developed under the rules of the PURPA energy legislation of 1978. In the case of the Bellingham plant, the developer achieved Qualifying Facility ("QF") status in a unique way by supplying process steam to an adjoining carbon dioxide capture unit which processed a slip

stream of exhaust gas to produce beverage-grade CO_{2} sold to a nearby soft-drink bottling plant.

For the Sayreville project, the owners found a more conventional means to achieve QF status by exporting steam for process use at a nearby chemical plant. Today both the Bellingham and Sayreville "Energy Centers" are owned by NextEra Energy Resources,

Both the Bellingham and Sayreville plants were supplied by Westinghouse PGBU under turnkey contracts, as was another important milestone cogeneration combined cycle plant built around the same timeframe in New Jersey, the approximately 150 MW Newark Bay Cogeneration facility, which uses two 46.5 MW W251B10 gas turbine units.

=== Introduction of the 501F Advanced Gas Turbine ===
As noted earlier work by Westinghouse CTO on the advanced 150 MW-class 501F started in Concordville two years before the move to Orlando. This new engine was being co-developed with Mitsubishi Heavy Industries (MHI), a decades-long Westinghouse licensee, acting in a new role as design partner, investing in the development, and working alongside Westinghouse engineers.

The design target was a 2300F (1260C) rotor inlet temperature, with a mature rating expected to be around 160 MW. The introductory rating was set at 145 MW with simple cycle heat rate of 10,000 Btu/kwh or 34% efficiency. The combined cycle efficiency being advertised at the time was "better than 50%".

Although the 501F had many design changes and improvements to achieve higher firing temperature and better reliability, its family DNA is clearly rooted in the W501, as is evident from the list of design features cited earlier. (Note the use 501F vs. W501F, in deference to MHI, which to this day uses the Westinghouse model nomenclature for its large gas turbine products).

The prototype 501F engine was built by MHI at its Takasago manufacturing and testing facilities. In mid-1989 it was reported in the press that the prototype unit would be undergoing full-load factory testing. The first 501F gas turbines (4 of them) were sold to Florida Power & Light Co. for the Lauderdale Station repowering project, and went into service in 1993. This was the first of several large repowering projects undertaken by the Florida utility, most of which used Westinghouse gas turbines (or Siemens gas turbines, following the Siemens acquisition of Westinghouse PGBU in 1998, below.) As noted earlier, the introductory rating of the 501F in 1988 was 145 MW, when it was said that the mature rating would exceed 150 MW. As shown in the adjoining curve, the growth of the Westinghouse "F" machine over the decade 1988-1998 greatly exceeded original expectations

The curve plots 501F combined cycle efficiency vs. time, with simple cycle power rating and heat rate shown at intervals along the development timeline. (Ed. Note: As of this edit in 2016, MHI offers the M501F3 at 185 MW and Siemens offers the SGT6-5000F (a.k.a. 501F) at 242MW, approximately the rating of the original 501G, below.)

=== Introducing the 250 MW-class W501G ===
Around mid-1994, two announcements were made almost simultaneously - one at the June ASME International Gas Turbine Conference at The Hague and the other at the Edison Electric Institute meeting in Seattle, WA. Westinghouse and its (then) tri-lateral alliance partners, MHI and FiatAvio announced their new W501G (or 501G) high-temperature gas turbine that would operate at 2600F turbine rotor inlet temperature.

This announcement was ahead of any such similar announcements by GE or Siemens, both of which were also rumored to be working on their own high-temperature machines.

The W501G was touted to be a new machine, with an advanced 17 stage compressor design achieving a 19:1 pressure ratio (vs. 15:1 for the W501F). The combustion section featured DLN combustors with <25ppm NOx on gas (advertised from the start) and, notably, steam-cooled transition ducts. This novel design substantially reduced the amount of cooling air needed in the hot section of the engine, and eliminated the dilution effect of transition cooling air in the combustion zone.

The design of the W501G turbine section, while continuing to use the basic traditional 4-stage through-bolted-disc rotor configuration of Westinghouse W501D design, but had technology input from Rolls-Royce aero engineering, employing 3-D blading design code for all stationary and rotating rows. It also features advanced material and coatings, as well as improved air-foil cooling designs to withstand the increased hot-gas-path temperatures (250F higher than the W501F at the rotor inlet at the time).

The prototype W501G was installed at The City of Lakeland (FL) McIntosh station and was first synchronized to the grid in April, 1999, shortly after the Siemens acquisition of Westinghouse PGBU. For more details on the W501G and the McIntosh plant see Modern Power Systems, Jan. 2001. (It is noted that current Siemens gas turbine product offerings do not include the "G", as it was replaced, first by the advanced air-cooled "F" and then by the 300 MW "H". MHI continues to offer their "M501G" – both steam-cooled and air-cooled, rated at around 270 MW, as well as their new 300 MW-plus model M501J).

== Siemens acquisition ==
In 1998, 55 years after Westinghouse built its first gas turbine engine for the US Navy, Siemens AG of Germany acquired the Power Generation Business Unit (then part of CBS Corp.) and the Westinghouse gas turbine business was integrated into that of Siemens.

For the first five years after the acquisition, the Orlando operation was called "Siemens Westinghouse", temporarily continuing presence of the Westinghouse name. That ended in 2003, when the only name seen at the Orlando office is that of Siemens.

As Siemens developed new gas turbine products with more advanced technology, the new optimized offerings incorporated features of both Westinghouse and Siemens technology and design traditions.

=== Boom market ===
Just after the sale of the Power Generation Business Unit to Siemens in 1998, the IPP market for gas turbine based cogeneration projects exploded (see chart). Unlike the first PURPA-driven wave of pent-up business in the mid-1980s, where U.S. new-unit gas turbine sales peaked at around 9-10GW the enormous bubble that started in 1997/98 reached an annual sales level that exceeded 60GW.

The sales boom was triggered by a number of factors, some of which may have been fabricated by the IPP community itself, and the period represented an unheard of sellers’ market for large gas turbines. Demand was such that the suppliers were rationing their shop space and demanding that customers sign "reservation agreements" and pay non-refundable deposits.

Favorite domestic IPP customers were given preference, and some international opportunities were forgone for lack of units. The Siemens investment of some $6 billion to acquire PGBU from CBS Corp. (oka Westinghouse Electric Corp.) quickly paid off and, in spite of the bubble bursting shortly thereafter, is still providing profitable returns.

== In international markets ==
From the earliest days of Westinghouse's land-based gas turbine business, markets outside of the U.S. played a very important role in the growth and survival of the business. In the mid-1970s and through the early 1980s, the importance of the international markets, in particular in Saudi Arabia (see below), became critical to the survival of the gas turbine industry as the US electric utility market collapsed.

Since earliest applications were primarily in the petrochemical industry, there were many units sold to oil refining and gas-pipeline companies going back to the first W31 (3000 hp) units sold in the mid-1950s for installation in Japan, Sumatra, Cuba and Aruba. These were all used as mechanical drive prime movers.

Other important early markets overseas included Libya, Iran and Nigeria (16 W72, 8300 hp mech drive units built by Werkspoor in the Netherlands), Venezuela, Brazil, Mexico, Colombia, Iraq, Syria (7 W82 units also built by Werkspoor), and many units, e.g. 27xW92 10,000 hp units, built for TransCanada and Westcoast Transmission, et al. for pipeline compressor stations in Canada.

The largest international project at the time came to be somewhat fortuitously ca. 1955 when ESSO (as Creole Petrol Co., Venezuela) was looking to replace several two-shaft GE mechanical drive units that had failed. Those failures had shown ESSO that a two-shaft solution was unsuitable for handling the tricky job of compressing of wet associated-gas for reinjection under Lake Maracaibo.

Westinghouse offered a direct-drive concept in the W101, which proved to be the replacement that was needed to do the job. During the 15-year period from 1956 through 1971, Westinghouse installed nearly 50 W101 direct-drive units on several floating platforms moored in place above the producing wells. Kudos to Tom Putz (Engineering Manager), Don Jones, Sales Manager, Joe Yindra, Project Engineer, and others on the team (including those at ESSO engineering) who made this a major success story and helped put Westinghouse gas turbines firmly on the map. (From interview with Don Jones – Dec. 2015)

Another important early international project for Westinghouse Gas Turbines was one of the earliest heat recovery applications. This was for the Panama Canal Co. and utilized two W171 (12,000 kW) units, ca. 1963.

== Saudi Arabian market ==
In 1969, two W191 (17,000 kW) gas turbines were sold for installation in East Dammam, Saudi Arabia. (These units were built by Werkspoor, in the Netherlands). This appears to be the first Westinghouse gas turbines sold into the Kingdom and represented the beginning of a very important relationship with what ultimately developed into one of the key markets for large 50 Hz gas turbines in the world.

As Saudi Arabia developed from the days after WWII to the major supplier of oil, both US and UK influences came into play in electrification of the desert Kingdom, as well as other parts of the Mid-East. Under UK (and other European) influence, the power systems being developed in the region operated at 50 Hz. Under US influence, regional generation, transmission and distribution was developed as a 60 Hz system. Saudi Arabia is the only country in the mid-East with a large 50 Hz system.

For Westinghouse, which did not develop its own large 50 Hz direct-drive gas turbine product line, it was fortunate that the main influence in the electrification of the most populated and industrialized part of Saudi Arabia was carried out under the control of Aramco, the Arabian-American (Oil) Company (now Saudi Aramco), the major oil producing and refining US/Saudi joint venture company. It was important that the major purchasing operation for Aramco was located Houston, TX. (Later, the power system developed by Aramco was incorporated into various regional SCECOs (Saudi Consolidated Electric Co.).

By the mid-1970s, with Aramco buying most of the turbine generators equipment for electrification, Saudi Arabia became a major market for large 50 Hz gas turbines. Ironically, this huge Saudi market materialized just as the US market for gas turbines and combined cycle plants all but evaporated, in large part due to the Arab Oil Embargo of 1975, and subsequent energy legislation passed by the US Congress and Jimmy Carter's administration in 1978. Needless to say, competition from GE and others for the Saudi/Aramco business was fierce. Westinghouse's ability to capitalize on the opportunity and gain its share of the market was due in part to the availability of shop inventory due to many cancellations of orders that came with the slowdown in the domestic market. (Story goes that material for more than 50 W251 and W501s was ordered in anticipation of continued U.S. market in early 1973.) Also to be credited are the talents of the Westinghouse engineering, projects management and sales team, well as the support of Power Systems International and the Houston Field Sales office.

=== Challenges ===
The first wave of orders for Saudi projects resulted in some 17 W501D (95.5 MW) EconoPac units being installed at four sites over the period 1976-1981, and Westinghouse established itself as a major player in the Saudi market.

Meanwhile, the US market continued to be depressed – in fact, at near-zero levels. The only domestic orders of any significance in 1980/81were for the first three W501D5 units – the prototype for Gulf States Utilities and two units for Dow Chemical, Plaquemine, LA. Westinghouse also booked an order with CFE for four gas turbines (2xW501D4 and 2xW501D5) to be supplied on an emergency basis for the Tula project (Hidalgo, Mexico).

CTSD was under heavy pressure from headquarters to book enough business to support continued factory operations, and once again attention turned to opportunities in Saudi Arabia to absorb the inventory. However, these opportunities were for extended scope projects that came with significant complications and risks that proved to be very challenging for Westinghouse.

Bids were submitted and two major orders were obtained from SCECO-Central: one for Hail (5x W501D5) and one for Qaseem (9x W501D). Both plants were to be built on a turnkey contract basis, and, to add to the challenge, they were both to be fueled with treated Saudi crude oil.

The use of Saudi crude as a fuel for gas turbines operating at turbine inlet temperature in excess of 2000F posed a significant engineering and operational challenge that apparently was not fully understood when the contracts were signed. (Rumor has it that the fuel contaminant levels, specifically sodium and vanadium, were far in excess of the original specifications, and the fuel treatment systems were undersized. In addition, there was (reportedly) evidence of further contamination of fuel oil during transportation, which was by tanker truck at the time.)

All of the earlier Saudi units used natural gas or distillate fuel oil, so there we no such operational and fuel contamination issues involved with those.

Also, the broad-scope turnkey nature of both projects required Westinghouse to subcontract with many international companies for the engineering and construction aspects of the work, and for supplying plant equipment and material, exposing the company to even more risk. Combine this with the complexity of long-distance communications between the construction sites and project engineers in Concordville, and you had a recipe for all sorts of technical and logistical problems. (It was said later by personnel directly involved that the telex room at Concordville was typically full of teletype tape every morning with messages from site engineers.)

On top of those problems, the contract terms accepted to close the Hail and Qaseem orders were apparently very onerous, including long-term parts warranties that covered damage to hot-path components exposed to corrosive contaminants found in the Saudi crude oil.

Suffice to say that the Hail and Qaseem projects turned into major financial setbacks. One result was that there were three changes in general management at Concordville over the next 3–4 years. Another result, say some, was a period where Westinghouse essentially had to stay in the gas turbine business, despite all of the setbacks and lack of profitable business, under pressure from the Saudis to resolve contractual issues and legal action related to these two projects.

Although "Hail and Qaseem" bring back some difficult memories for those who still remember, it is said that time passes and heals all wounds - or that people tend to forget lessons learned. The records show that Westinghouse decided to take two more orders for crude-oil fueled plants (Asir and Jizan) in the mid-1990s. Presumably, enough was learned about fuel pre-treatment, as well as negotiating contract terms, over the 10 or more years since the signing of the Hail and Qaseem contracts. (It is believed that all of the crude-burning plants in Saudi have since been converted to natural gas fuel, and some to combined cycle operation.)

In mentioning Westinghouse business in Saudi, it is import to include the name ISCOSA. That was (and is still) the joint venture company formed in 1973 with a local business group to establish an in-country presence to service the growing fleet of Westinghouse gas turbines in the Kingdom. And with the mention of ISCOSA it is important also to mention the name of Tex Knight, who served as the General Manager of the operation from 1977 to 1987.

== Other important international markets ==
During the 1990s, in spite of a relative active U.S. market, Westinghouse participated actively in other significant international markets for gas turbines.

These included major successes with customers in South Korea (some 35-40 units), especially Korean Electric Power Co. (KEPCO) and Hanwha Energy. In Latin America, a large market was developed in Venezuela, especially with Electricidad de Caracas, and in Colombia, with orders for W501D5 and 501F units obtained for several locations, including one in rebel-held jungle! A significant order was obtained in Argentina (CAPSA) for 3xW251B11 and 1x701D, and the first-ever large gas turbine orders were obtained for W501D5 units both in Peru and Ecuador.

In fact, in 1992, Westinghouse Power Generation Marketing received special corporate recognition as the "Best of the Best" for its international successes (mostly in Latin America) in placing gas turbine orders.

Several orders were also obtained during the period for both W251 and W501 EconoPacs for installation atop specially designed barges to produce floating portable power plants for deployment around the world. Most of these barges were built by Sabah Shipyards in Malaysia.

== See also ==
- Westinghouse Aviation Gas Turbine Division
