= Westinghouse J30 =

American pioneering jet aircraft engine

J30
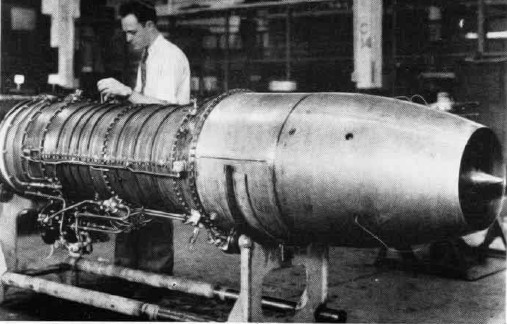
- Type: Turbojet
- National origin: United States
- Manufacturer: Westinghouse Aviation Gas Turbine Division
- First run: 19 March 1943
- Major applications: FH Phantom
- Developed into: Westinghouse J32; Westinghouse J34

The Westinghouse J30, initially known as the Westinghouse 19XB, was a turbojet engine developed by Westinghouse Electric Corporation. It was the first American-designed turbojet to run, and only the second axial-flow turbojet to run outside Germany (after the British Metropolitan-Vickers F.2).

A simple and robust unit with six-stage compressor, annular combustor, and single-stage turbine, it initially gave 1,200 pounds of thrust but improved to 1,600 in production versions. Its first flight was under a FG Corsair in January 1944. It was developed into the smaller J32, and the successful Westinghouse J34, an enlarged version which produced 3,000 pounds of thrust.

== Variants ==
Thrust given in foot-pounds (lbf) and kilonewtons (kN).

19A
Prototypes and initial production, boost engines
19B
1,400 lbf (6.23 kN) at 18,000 rpm at sea level. Increased mass flow version, added gearbox to allow engine to be a prime driver
19XB-2B
Company designation for WE-20.
XJ30-WE-7
1,600 lbf (7.1 kN) for Northrop X-4
XJ30-WE-8
originally designated J43
XJ30-WE-9
1,600 lbf (7.1 kN) for Northrop X-4
J30-WE-20
1,600 lbf (7.1 kN) production engine. Internal model 19XB-2B

== Applications ==
- Convair XF-92
- Grumman XTB3F-1
- Interstate XBDR
- McDonnell FH Phantom
- Northrop X-4 Bantam
- Northrop XP-79

== Specifications (Westinghouse 19A) ==
Data from Aircraft Engines of the world 1946

==== General characteristics ====
- Type: Axial flow turbojet
- Length: 100 in (2,500 mm)
- Diameter: 19 in (480 mm)
- Dry weight: 830 lb (380 kg)

==== Components ====
- Compressor: 6-stage axial
- Combustors: Annular stainless steel
- Turbine: Single-stage axial
- Fuel type: 100/130 gasoline
- Oil system: pressure spray at 40 psi (280 kPa) dry sump

==== Performance ====
- Maximum thrust: 1,360 lbf (6.0 kN) at 18,000 rpm at sea level
- Overall pressure ratio: 3:1
- Air mass flow: 26.5 lb/s (12.0 kg/s) at 17,000 rpm,
- Turbine inlet temperature: 1,500 °F (820 °C)
- Specific fuel consumption: 1.35 lb/(lbf⋅h) (38 g/(kN⋅s))
- Thrust-to-weight ratio: 1.64
- Normal thrust, static: 1,160 lbf (5.2 kN) at 18,000 rpm at sea level
- Military thrust, flight: 660 lbf (2.9 kN) at 17,200 rpm at altitude
- Normal thrust, flight: 570 lbf (2.5 kN) at 16,260 rpm at altitude

== See also ==
Related development

- Westinghouse J34

Comparable engines

- BMW 003
- Metropolitan-Vickers F.2

Related lists

- List of aircraft engines
