= Westinghouse Aviation Gas Turbine Division =

Former US manufacturer of aircraft engines

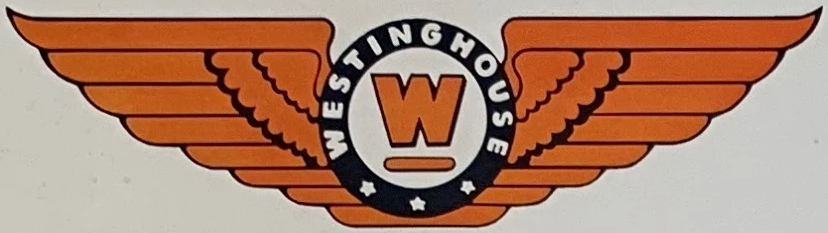
- Type: Division
- Industry: Aerospace
- Founded: 1945; 81 years ago
- Defunct: 1960; 66 years ago
- Fate: Shut down
- Headquarters: Kansas City, Missouri, United States
- Parent: Westinghouse Electric Corporation

The Westinghouse Aviation Gas Turbine Division (AGT) was established by Westinghouse Electric Corporation in 1945 to continue the development and production of its gas turbine engines for aircraft propulsion under contract to the US Navy Bureau of Aeronautics. The AGT Division was headquartered in Kansas City, Missouri, where it remained in operation until 1960 when Westinghouse decided to focus on industrial and electric utility gas turbines.

== History ==
A concise history of Westinghouse jet engine development may be found in the ASME technical paper entitled "Evolution of Heavy-Duty Power Generation and Industrial Gas Turbines in the United States" delivered at the ASME International Gas Turbine Conference, The Hague, June, 1994. This paper was compiled by Westinghouse engineers who had direct personal experience or close personal connections with the subject. The following summary is gleaned from that paper as well as from the Tommy Thomason reference also cited.

In March, 1943, the first US designed and manufactured jet engine went on test at Westinghouse, 15 months after the signing of a contract with the U.S. Navy Bureau of Aeronautics. This first engine, with a 19 in. intake diameter, was designated the Model 19A, had a thrust of 1130 lb. and weighed 827 lb. It had a combustor section with 20 tubes (not interconnected at first), a single stage turbine and an adjustable jet exhaust nozzle. It was configured as a booster engine, with only the accessories needed to start and control the engine. The second engine built was flown in 1944 under a Chance Vought FG-1 fighter as a boost engine on the center-line. It delivered 1,365 lb of static thrust at sea level, standard day conditions. The booster engine could be started with impingement air on the turbine blades or by propeller slip stream on the ground.

The engine was then modified into the Model 19B, which combined improved axial blade and stator design, a new annular combustion chamber and added a new accessories gearbox under the engine to drive airframe accessories such as hydraulics and a generator. The engine suffered from protracted problems with combustion hot spots and acceleration flat zones. Some Model 19B's were used to power the prototypes of the McDonnell XFD-1 and two powered the ill-fated Northrop XF-79B which crashed on its first flight due to no fault of the engines.

Due to wartime secrecy, Westinghouse worked on its own, with no prior jet engine experience and without knowledge of German, British or other US jet engine developments.

The basic principle of the engine was similar to the original Whittle engine developed in England, but Westinghouse’s use of an axial flow compressor, along with internal combustion chamber, were major advancements that led the way to a practical engine for aviation propulsion. (Earliest GE jet engines, based on the Whittle design and developed with Allison, featured a centrifugal compressor. GE and Allison had the Army contract to develop a ‘land based’ jet while the Westinghouse Navy contract was for carrier-based Navy jet fighters.)

One year later, an improved Model 19B, the 19XB-2B, changed to a 10 stage compressor. Under the new designation system, it was now called the J30. It was used to power the Navy’s first production jet fighter, the McDonnell Douglas FH-1 Phantom. 61 FH-1 Phantoms were equipped with the J30 engine. (It is noteworthy that Pratt & Whitney Aircraft, then a major producer of piston aircraft engines for the military, entered the jet engine business in 1945 as a Westinghouse/US Navy licensee to build the J30 engine.)

The J34, a 34-in. diameter engine that delivered 3000 lb. of thrust, turned out to be the last production engine built by Westinghouse at its Aviation Gas Turbine Division facility in Kansas City, Missouri. It was used extensively by the Navy in the McDonnell F2D Banshee, the Douglas F3D Skyknight and Vought F7U-1 Cutlass, with the addition of an afterburner.

Late in the 1940s, to meet the growing needs of the Navy for higher thrust and longer range (a jet bomber was planned as well as new Navy fighter jets), Westinghouse began development of the J40, with a target thrust of 7500 lb. (10,900 lb. with afterburner).

The J40 program was plagued by delays and development problems. The most significant of these were the failure of the electronic control system and the need to replace it, development of the afterburner and the integration of the afterburner into the engine control system. The McDonnell F3H-1N Demon was the primary target for the engine and during development, its weight increased dramatically and the thrust of the original J40 was no longer adequate. An improved J40 with a 13 stage compressor and increased air flow failed in development and the Allison J71 with an afterburner was substituted. Due to delays in afterburner development on that engine, initial production of the long delayed F3H-2N was begun using the earlier J40 as a stop-gap. This soon proved to be a major mistake and both the J40 and Demon were grounded after a number of aircraft were lost. Ultimately, other aircraft planned for the J40 were either cancelled or outfitted with alternative engines, and the J40 was never qualified for full production. The program was terminated in 1955.

Although production and support of the J34 continued, Westinghouse exited the jet engine business in 1960, closing the Kansas City operation, after having supplied engines for 1223 Navy jet planes. Ironically, the first Pan Am Boeing 707 had just flown its maiden commercial flight, powered by Pratt & Whitney jet engines, just a year earlier. A technical assistance agreement with Rolls-Royce appeared to influence many engines proposed after early 1952, but none of these designs found acceptance by US airframe manufacturers or the military.

Following closure of AGT Division in 1960, many of its engineers joined the growing land-based gas turbine business of Westinghouse's Small Steam & Gas Turbine Division, located at its Steam Turbine manufacturing headquarters in Lester, PA, near to Philadelphia.

== Products ==
Model name	Configuration	Power	Notes
Westinghouse J30	Turbojet	1,360 lbf	Major use: McDonnell FH Phantom
Westinghouse J32	Turbojet	275 lbf	Major use: Naval Aircraft Modification Unit KDN Gorgon
Westinghouse J34	Turbojet	3,400 lbf	Major uses: McDonnell F2H Banshee, Douglas F3D Skyknight, Lockheed P-2 Neptune
Westinghouse J40	Turbojet	7,300 lbf	Major use: McDonnell F3H Demon
Westinghouse J43			
Westinghouse J45			
Westinghouse J46	Turbojet	3,980 lbf	Major use: Vought F7U Cutlass
Westinghouse XJ54	Turbojet	12,690 lbf	Variation of the British Rolls-Royce Avon
Westinghouse J81	Turbojet	1,810 lbf	Variation of the British Rolls-Royce Soar
Westinghouse T30			
Westinghouse T70			
