= Northrop XP-79 =

Prototype flying wing fighter aircraft

XP-79
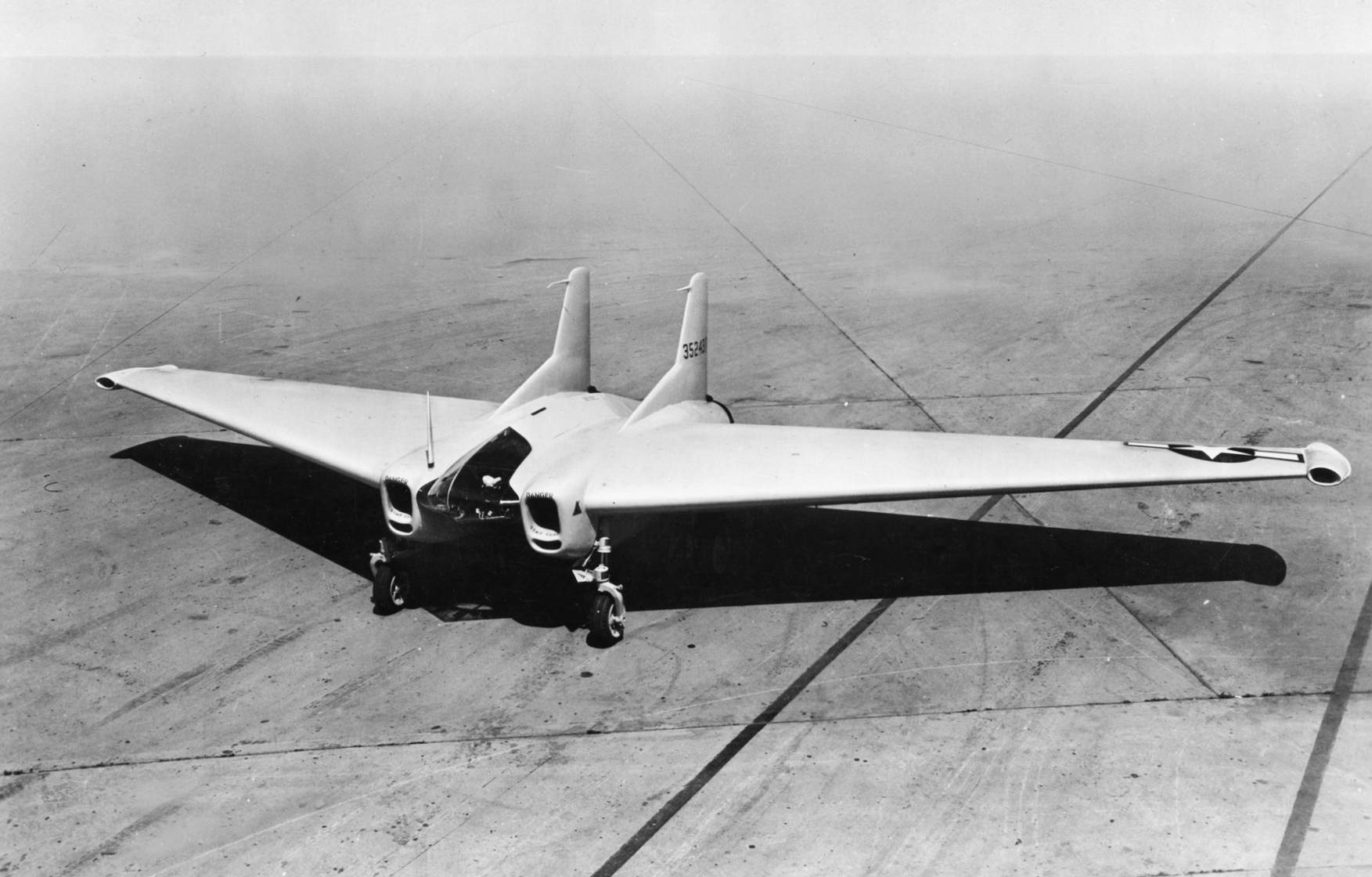
- The sole prototype XP-79B.

General information
- Type: Interceptor
- Manufacturer: Northrop Corporation
- Designer: Jack Northrop
- Status: Crashed, out of service
- Primary user: United States Army Air Forces
- Number built: 1

History
- First flight: 12 September 1945
- Retired: 12 September 1945

The Northrop XP-79, USAAF project number MX-365, was a rocket and jet-powered flying wing fighter aircraft, designed by Northrop. The pilot operated the aircraft in a prone position, permitting much greater g-forces to be resisted by the pilot in pitch. The XP-79 also used a welded magnesium monocoque structure instead of riveted aluminum.

== Design and development ==
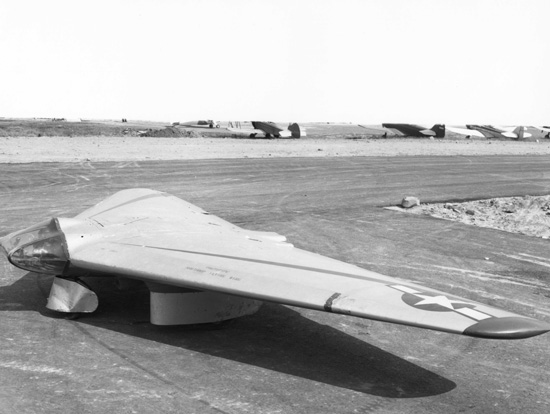
The MX-334

In 1942, Jack Northrop conceived the XP-79 as a high-speed rocket-powered flying-wing fighter aircraft. In January 1943, a contract for two prototypes under the XP-79 designation was issued by the United States Army Air Forces (USAAF).

It was planned to use a 2,000 lbf (8,900 N) thrust XCALR-2000A-1 "rotojet" rocket motor from Aerojet that used mono-ethylaniline fuel and red fuming nitric acid (RFNA) oxidizer. However, the rocket motor, which used canted rockets to drive turbo-pumps was unsatisfactory and the aircraft was fitted with two Westinghouse 19B turbojets and re-designated XP-79B.

The XP-79 was built using a welded magnesium alloy monocoque structure with a leading edge thickness of 0.75 in (19 mm) which thinned out to 0.125 in (3.2 mm) at the trailing edge.

The pilot controlled the XP-79 through a tiller bar and intakes mounted at the wingtips supplied air for the unusual bellows-boosted split elevons which opened differentially to provide lateral (yaw) control, by increasing drag on one side of the aircraft, in addition to providing roll and pitch. The aircraft was also fitted with airbrakes outboard of them, also for yaw control. No rudders were used, and the vertical surfaces were simple fixed fins with no flight controls.

=== MX-324 and MX-334 ===
Northrop was given a contract to build three glider demonstrators to test the design. Given the Northrop designation NS-12, the three gliders were also given project numbers from the USAAF. Confusingly, two project numbers were used, one MX-324 when discussing secret aspects of the powered gliders, and another, MX-334, relating to the aircraft when being built and flown as pure gliders.

The MX-334 was a flying wing glider with no tail surfaces, similar in layout and construction to the Northrop N-9M. Completed in late Spring 1943, MX-334 No.1 was tested in NACA Langley's wind tunnel, after which a large wire-braced fin was added for directional stability at high speeds. The first flight attempts were carried out by the no.2 aircraft towed behind a Cadillac car for low level take-off and landing tests, with no success. After modifications the first launch was carried out on 4 September 1943, towed behind a large truck. For more comprehensive testing, a Lockheed P-38 Lightning was used to tow the aircraft on 2 October 1943.

In early 1944 the no.2 aircraft was modified to take the 2,009 lbf (8,940 N) Aerojet XCAL-200 rocket motor, and reverted to the secret MX-324 designation. Testing with the rocket motor commenced on 22 June 1944, with the first aerotow launch for a powered flight on 5 July 1944, making it the first US-built rocket-powered aircraft to fly. Flight testing was concluded by 1 August 1944 and the two remaining aircraft were disposed of. MX-334 no.3 was written off on its second flight, on 10 November 1943, after Harry Crosby lost control in the prop-wash of the P-38 tug.

== Testing ==
Following delays due to burst tires and brake problems during taxiing trials at Muroc dry lake, the XP-79B made its first flight on 12 September 1945. 15 minutes into the flight, control was lost for unknown reasons while performing a slow roll. The nose dropped, and the roll continued with the aircraft impacting the ground in a vertical spin. Test pilot Harry Crosby had attempted to bail out but was struck by the aircraft and died. Shortly thereafter, the project was canceled along with work on the second prototype.

== Variants ==
Data from: Northrop Flying Wings: a history of Jack Northrop's visionary aircraft

NS-12
Northrop company designation for the MX-324 program.
NS-14
Northrop designation for the XP-79 program.
MX-324
The "secret" designation for the powered version of the MX-334 glider. Only used for the no.2 glider, when powered by a single 200 lbf (890 N) Aerojet XCAL-200 liquid-fueled rocket engine.
MX-334
The designation used to describe the pure glider version (including the no.2 aircraft before it was fitted with the rocket engine).
MX-365
The USAAC project number for the XP-79 program.
XP-79
The initial design for a rocket powered fighter, to have been powered by 2 x 2,000 lbf (8.9 kN) Aerojet XCAL-2000 liquid-fueled rocket engine.
XP-79B
Three aircraft were ordered but only one was completed, crashing on its first flight on 12 September 1945.

== Specifications (XP-79B) ==
Data from Northrop Flying Wings : a history of Jack Northrop's visionary aircraft

General characteristics

- Crew: 1
- Length: 13.98 ft (4.26 m)
- Wingspan: 37.99 ft (11.58 m)
- Height: 7.58 ft (2.31 m)
- Wing area: 278 sq ft (25.8 m^{2})
- Aspect ratio: 5.19
- Airfoil: NACA 66,2-018
- Empty weight: 5,842 lb (2,650 kg)
- Gross weight: 8,669 lb (3,932 kg)
- Fuel capacity: 300 US gal (250 imp gal; 1,100 L)
- Powerplant: 2 × Westinghouse 19B axial flow turbojet, 1,150 lbf (5.1 kN) thrust each

Performance

- Maximum speed: 547 mph (880 km/h, 475 kn)
- Cruise speed: 480 mph (770 km/h, 420 kn)
- Range: 993 mi (1,598 km, 863 nmi)
- Endurance: 2.45 hours
- Service ceiling: 40,000 ft (12,000 m)
- Rate of climb: 4,000 ft/min (20 m/s)
- Wing loading: 31 lb/sq ft (150 kg/m^{2})
- Thrust/weight: 0.27

Armament

- Guns: 4 x 0.5 in (12.70 mm) machine-guns

== See also ==
Aircraft of comparable role, configuration, and era

- Armstrong Whitworth A.W.52
- de Havilland DH 108
- Gloster Meteor F8 "Prone Pilot"
- Horten Ho 229
- Messerschmitt Me 163 Komet

Related lists

- List of jet aircraft of World War II
- List of military aircraft of the United States

== Bibliography ==
- Jenkins, Dennis R.; Landis, Tony R. (2008). Experimental & prototype U.S. Air Force jet fighters. North Branch, MN: Specialty Press. ISBN 978-1-58007-111-6.
- Pelletier, Alain J. "Towards the Ideal Aircraft: The Life and Times of the Flying Wing, Part Two". Air Enthusiast, No. 65, September–October 1996, pp. 8–19. ISSN 0143-5450.
