= Montes Secchi =

Lunar mountain range

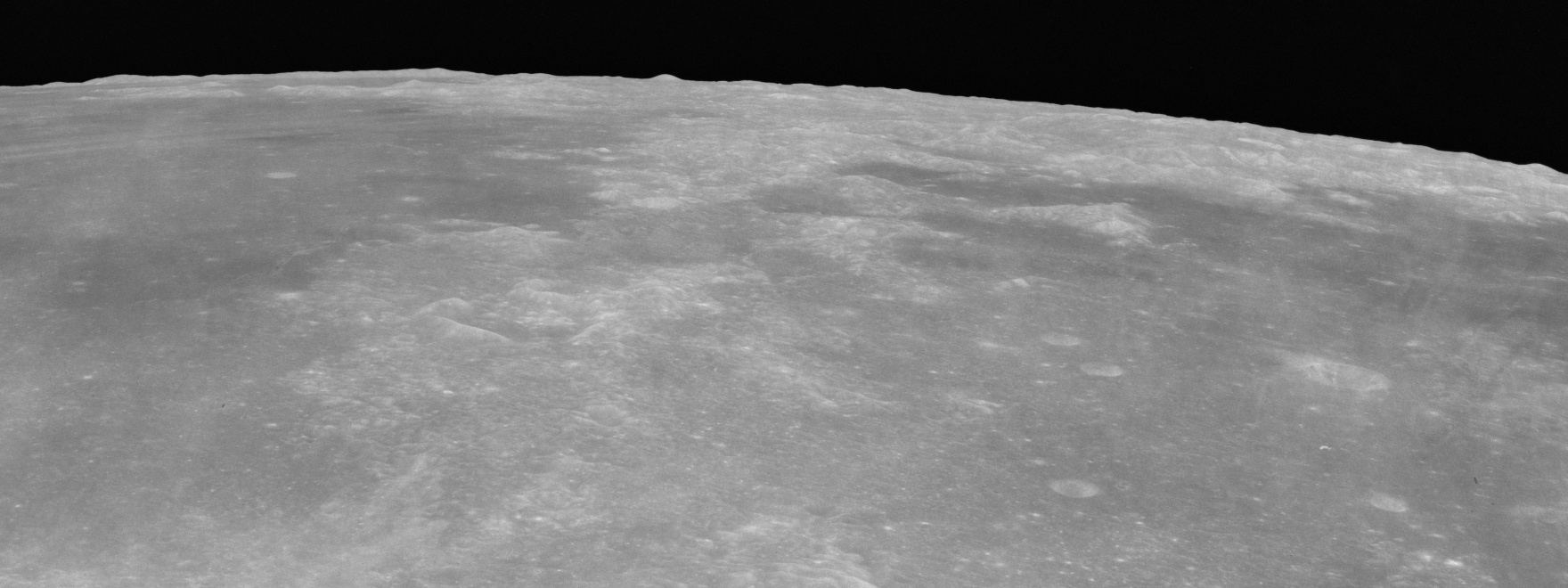
- Oblique view of Montes Secchi, facing south. The crater Secchi is below left of center, Mare Fecunditatis is at left, and Mare Tranquillitatis is at right.

Highest point
- Listing: Lunar mountains
- Coordinates: 2.4°N 43.6°E

Naming
- Etymology: Angelo Secchi

Geography
- Location: the Moon

Montes Secchi (Latin for "Secchi Mountains") is a minor range of lunar mountains located near the northwestern edge of Mare Fecunditatis. This roughly linear formation of low ridges grazes the northwestern outer rim of the crater Secchi, the formation from which this range gained its name. This crater is named after Angelo Secchi, a 19th-century Italian astronomer. The ridges trend from southwest to northeast.

In the vicinity of Montes Secchi is Mount Marilyn, a distinctly triangular mountain formation. It was named in 1968 by Apollo 8 astronaut Jim Lovell, after his wife. The name was not approved by the IAU until July 26, 2017. Before its approval, it was known as Secchi Theta.

The selenographic coordinates of the range midpoint are 2.4° N, 43.6° E, and they lie within a diameter of 50 km. This is smaller than the diameter of the crater Taruntius, located to the northeast of the mountains.

== Gallery ==
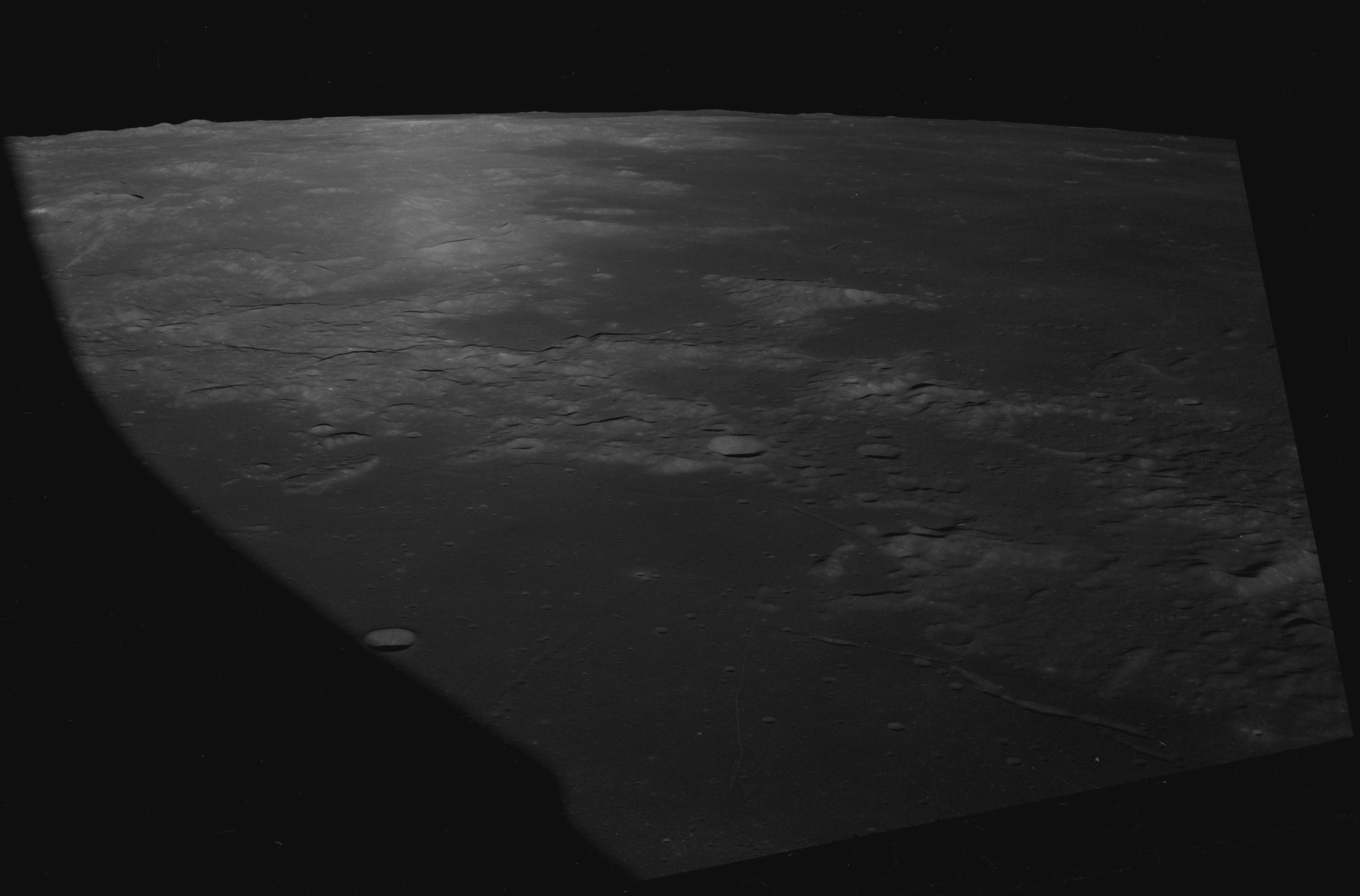
Oblique view facing west from Apollo 8

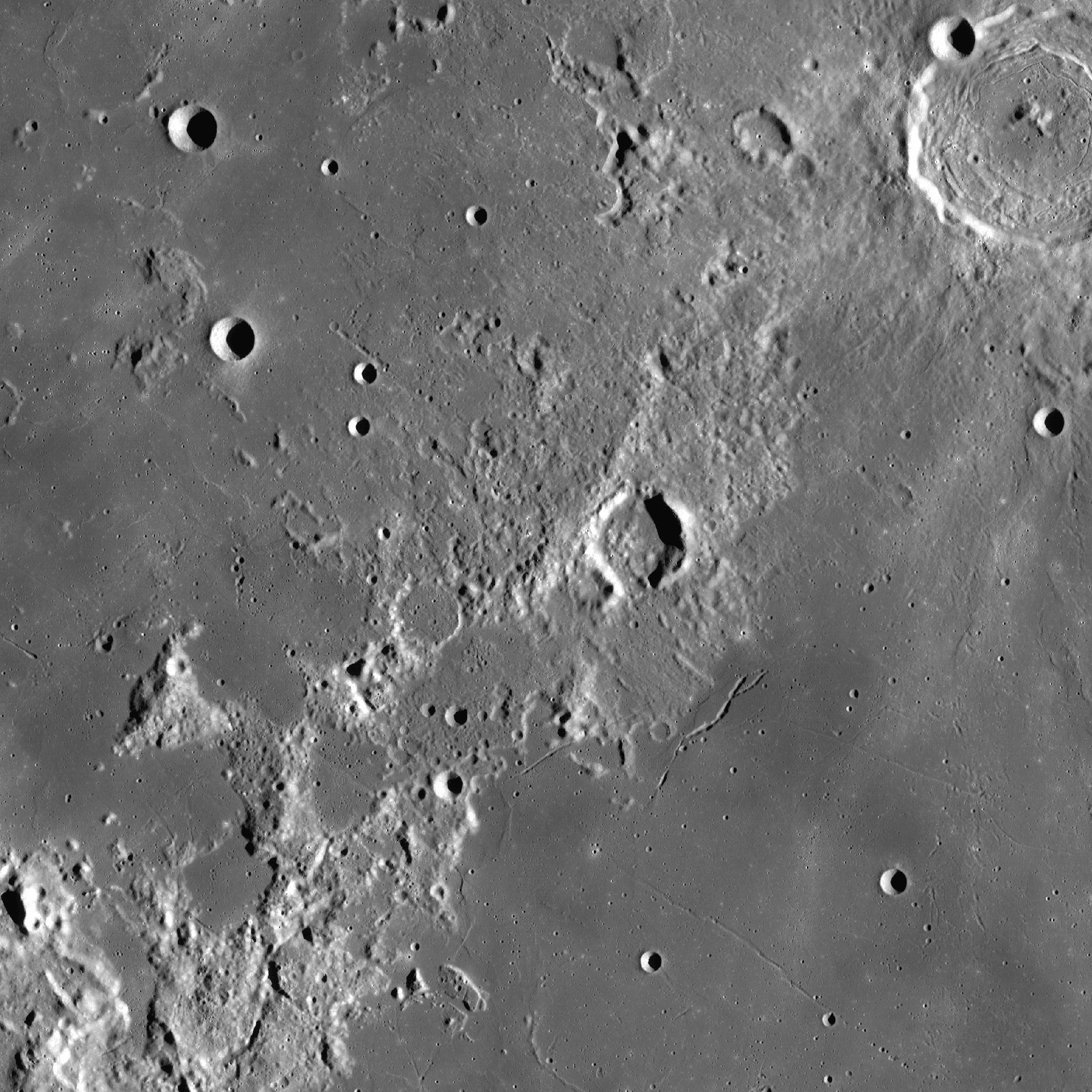
LRO image of Montes Secchi
