= Jim Lovell =

American astronaut (1928–2025)

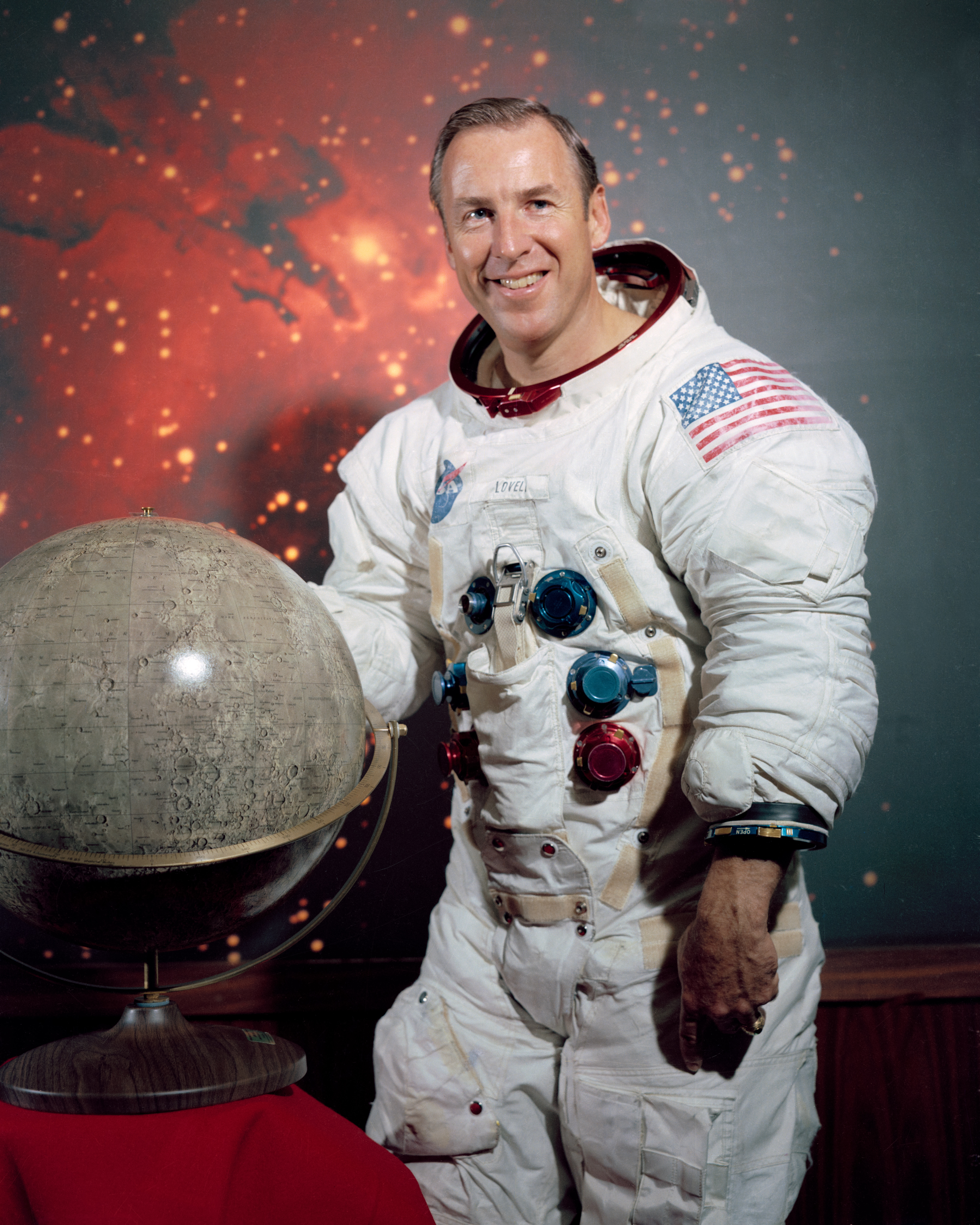
- Lovell in 1969
- Born: James Arthur Lovell Jr. March 25, 1928; Cleveland, Ohio, U.S.
- Died: August 7, 2025 (aged 97); Lake Forest, Illinois, U.S.
- Resting place: United States Naval Academy Cemetery
- Education: University of Wisconsin, Madison; United States Naval Academy (BS)
- Spouse: Marilyn Gerlach (m. 1952; died 2023)
- Children: 4
- Space career

NASA astronaut
- Time in space: 29 days, 19 hours, 5 minutes
- Selection: NASA Group 2 (1962)
- Mission: Gemini 7; Gemini 12; Apollo 8; Apollo 13
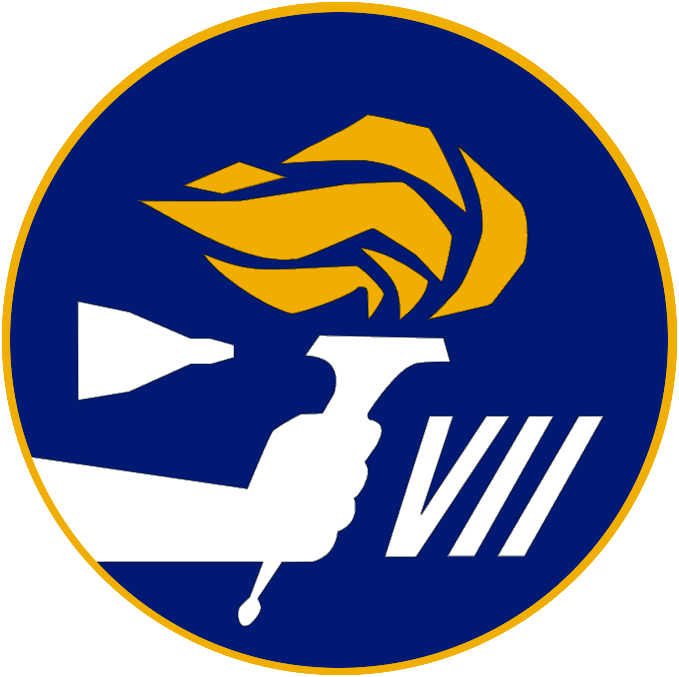
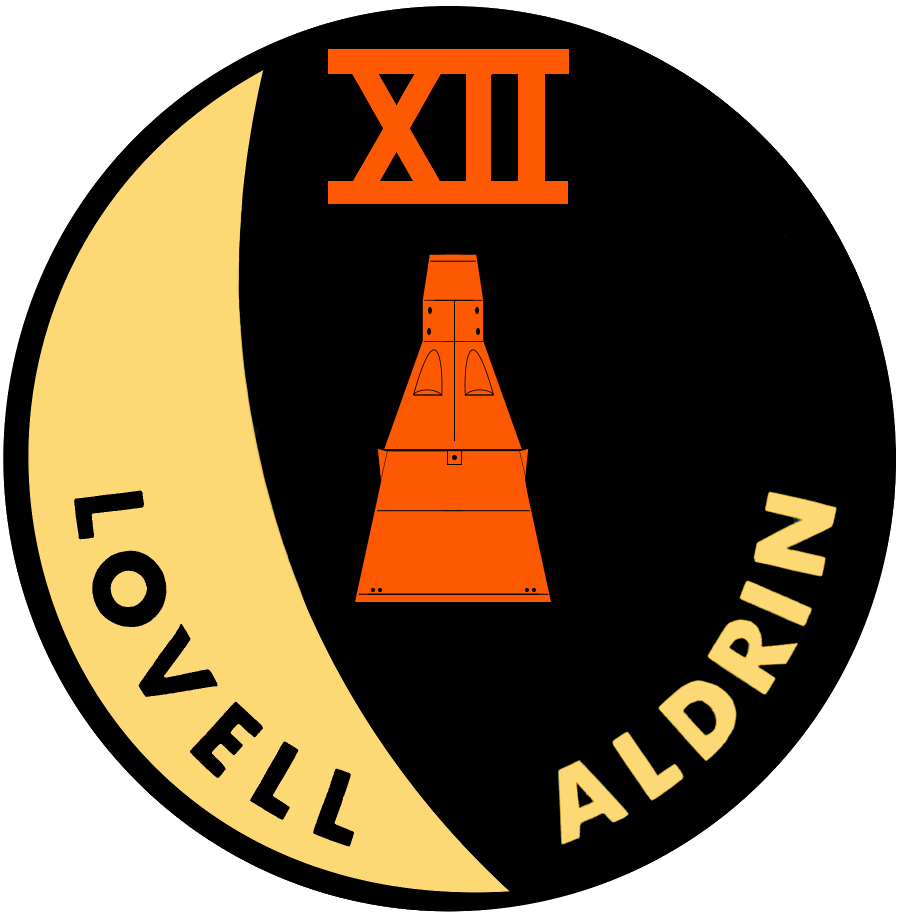
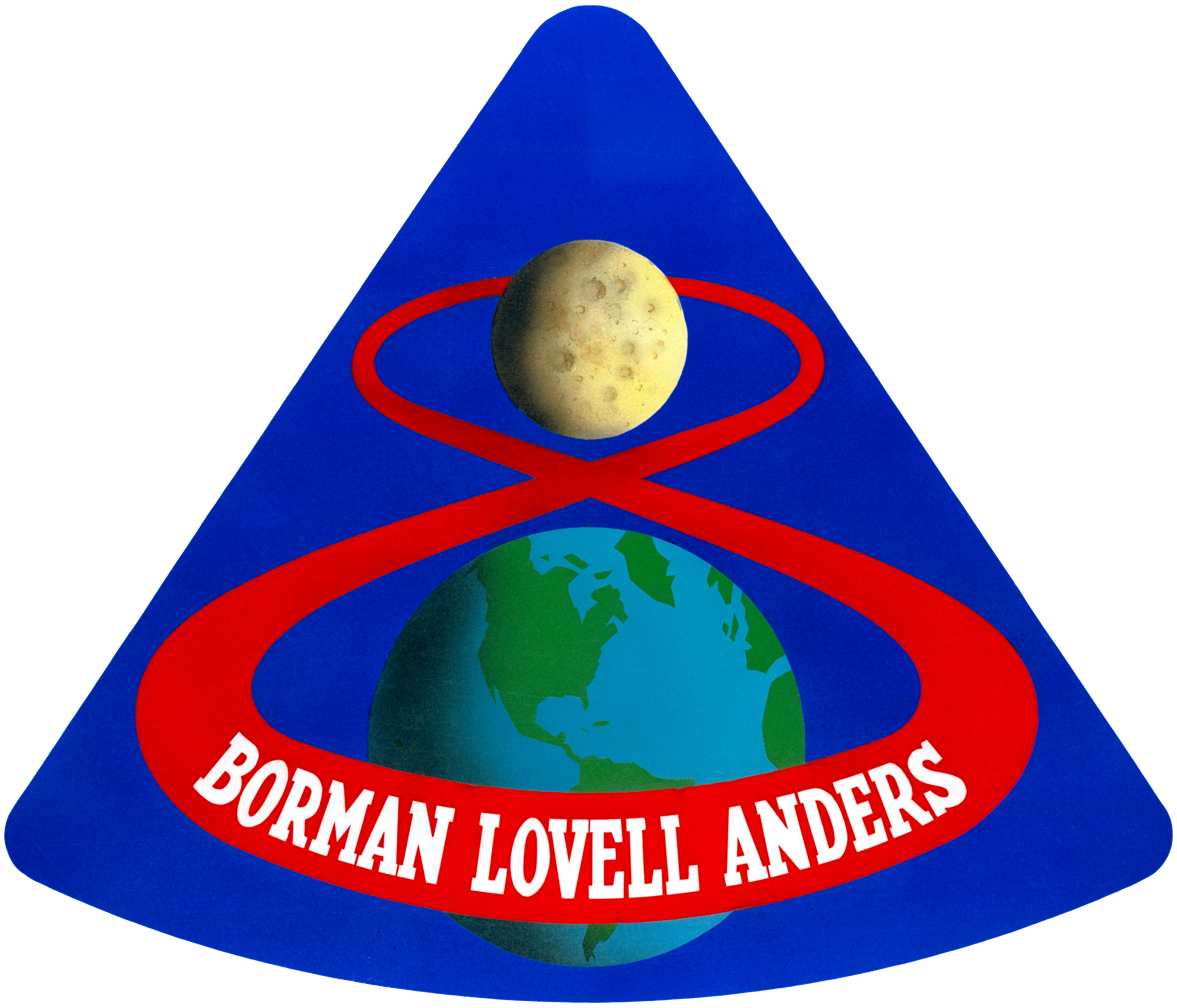
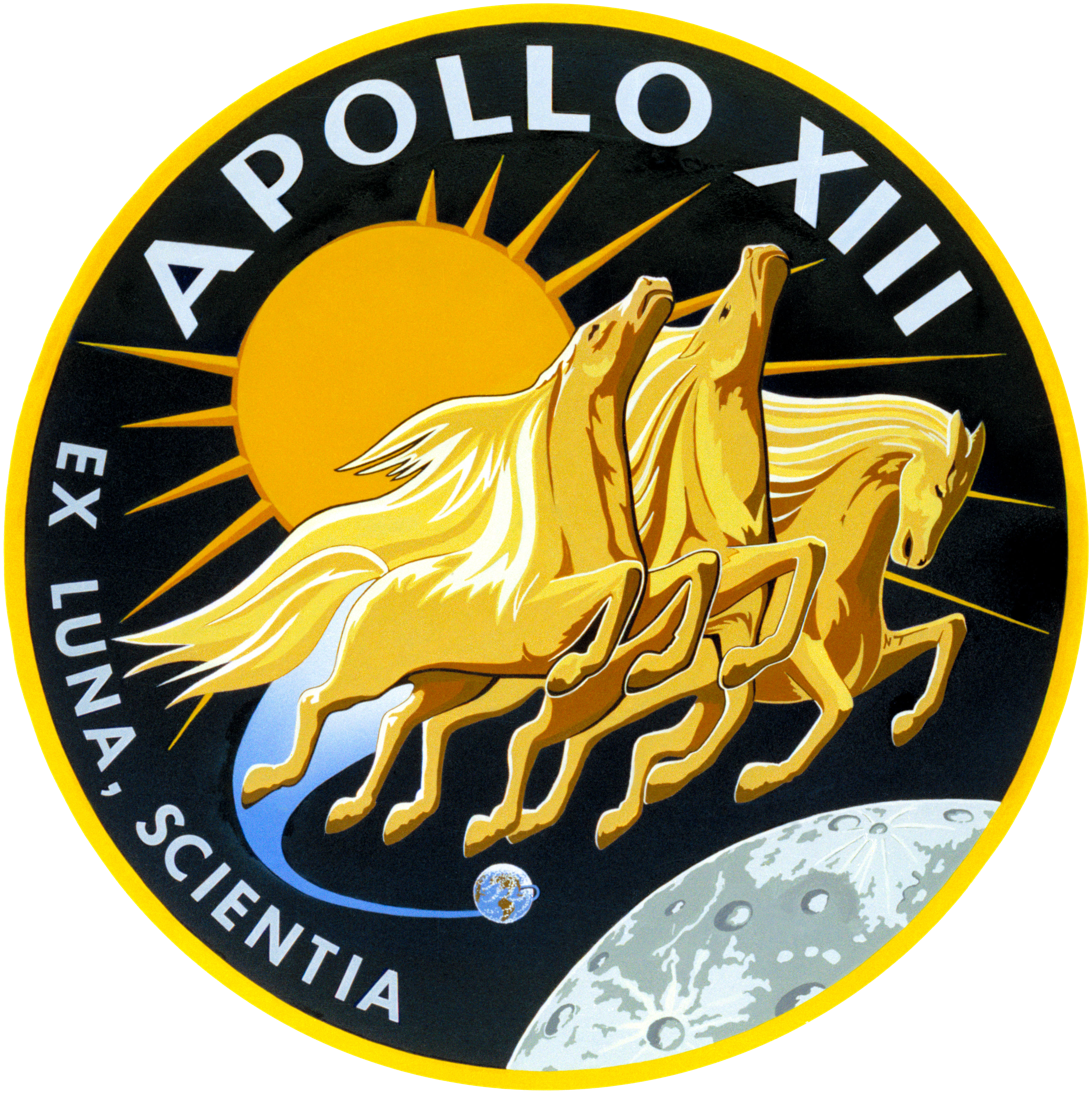
- Mission insignia
- Retired: March 1, 1973
- Military career
- Branch: United States Navy
- Years: 1952–1973
- Rank: Captain
- Units: VC-3; VF-101

Signature
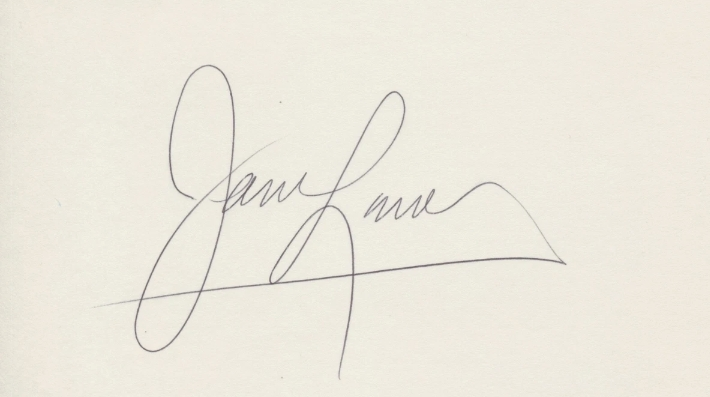

James Arthur Lovell Jr. (/ˈlʌvəl/ LUV-əl; March 25, 1928 – August 7, 2025) was an American astronaut, naval aviator, test pilot, and mechanical engineer. In 1968, as command module pilot of Apollo 8, he, along with Frank Borman and William Anders, became one of the first three astronauts to fly to and orbit the Moon. He then commanded in 1970 the Apollo 13 lunar mission, which, after a critical failure en route, looped around the Moon and returned safely to Earth.

A 1952 graduate of the United States Naval Academy in Annapolis, Maryland, Lovell flew McDonnell F2H Banshee night fighters. He was deployed in the Western Pacific aboard the aircraft carrier USS Shangri-La. In January 1958, he entered a six-month test pilot training course at the Naval Air Test Center at Naval Air Station Patuxent River, Maryland, with Class 20 and graduated at the top of the class. He was then assigned to Electronics Test, working with radar, and in 1960 he became the Navy's McDonnell Douglas F-4 Phantom II program manager. In 1961, he became a flight instructor and safety engineering officer at Naval Air Station Oceana in Virginia Beach, Virginia, and completed Aviation Safety School at the University of Southern California.

Lovell was passed over by NASA as one of the Mercury Seven astronauts because of a temporarily high bilirubin count. He was accepted in September 1962 as one of the second group of astronauts needed for the Gemini and Apollo programs. Before Apollo, Lovell flew in space on two Gemini missions: Gemini 7 (with Borman) in 1965 and Gemini 12 in 1966. He was the first person to fly into space four times. He was the first person to reach the Moon twice, and the only returnee who never walked on the surface. He was a recipient of the Congressional Space Medal of Honor and the Presidential Medal of Freedom. He cowrote the 1994 book Lost Moon, on which the 1995 film Apollo 13 was based, and he was featured in a cameo appearance in the film. Lovell died in 2025, aged 97.

== Early life ==
James Arthur Lovell Jr. was born in Cleveland, Ohio, on March 25, 1928. He was the only child of James Lovell Sr., a furnace salesman born in Toronto, Canada, who died in a car accident in 1933 when James Jr. was 5, and Blanche (née Masek), who was of Czech descent. For two years after the death of his father, Lovell and his mother lived with a relative in Terre Haute, Indiana. They then moved to Milwaukee, Wisconsin, and he went to Juneau High School. He was a member of the Boy Scouts during his childhood and became an Eagle Scout, the organization's highest rank. He was interested in rocketry and built flying models as a teenager.

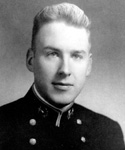
Lovell as an Annapolis midshipman in 1952

After graduating from high school, Lovell attended the University of Wisconsin in Madison for two years, where he studied engineering under the United States Navy's "Flying Midshipman" program from 1946 to 1948. He later credited the program for giving him the opportunity to attend college, saying that he otherwise did not have the money to attend. At Wisconsin, he played college football and pledged to the Alpha Phi Omega fraternity. He supplemented a meager Navy stipend by working at a local restaurant washing dishes and busing tables, and caring for the university's lab rats and mice on weekends.

While Lovell was attending pre-flight training in the summer of 1948, the Navy was beginning to cut the program. Cadets were under pressure to transfer out because there were concerns that the Navy would lack pilot billets for some or most of them upon graduation. To avoid this, Lovell decided to apply to the United States Naval Academy in Annapolis, Maryland. He secured a nomination from his local U.S. Representative, John C. Brophy, and entered Annapolis in July 1948.

During his first year, Lovell wrote a treatise on the liquid-propellant rocket engine. He graduated in the spring of 1952 with a Bachelor of Science degree and was commissioned as an ensign in the Navy.

== Marriage and family ==
Lovell began dating Marilyn Lillie Gerlach while they were in high school. As a college student, she transferred from Wisconsin State Teachers College to George Washington University in Washington, D.C., to be near him while he was attending the Naval Academy. They married on June 6, 1952, in a ceremony at St. Anne's Church in Annapolis. The couple had four children: Barbara, James, Susan, and Jeffrey.

== Navy career ==
Lovell was one of 50 members of his graduating class of 783 initially selected for naval aviation training. He went to flight training at Naval Air Station Pensacola from October 1952 to February 1954. He was designated a naval aviator on February 1, 1954, upon completion of pilot training, and was assigned to VC-3 at Moffett Field near San Francisco, California. From 1954 to 1956, he flew McDonnell F2H Banshee night fighters. This included a Western Pacific deployment aboard the aircraft carrier USS Shangri-La. Lovell eventually completed 107 carrier landings. Upon his return to shore duty, he was assigned to train pilots moving to the North American FJ-4 Fury, McDonnell F3H Demon, and Vought F8U Crusader.

In January 1958, Lovell entered a six-month test pilot training course at the Naval Air Test Center (today, the United States Naval Test Pilot School) at Naval Air Station Patuxent River, Maryland, with Class 20, which also included future astronauts Wally Schirra and Pete Conrad, who gave Lovell the nickname "Shaky". Lovell graduated at the top of the class. Usually, the top graduate was assigned to flight test on graduation. Still, the head of electronics test had complained about never getting the top graduate, so Lovell was assigned there, where he worked with radar sets.

Later that year, Lovell, Conrad, and Schirra were among 110 military test pilots selected as astronaut candidates for Project Mercury. Schirra went on to become one of the Mercury Seven, but Lovell was not selected because of a temporarily high bilirubin count. In 1960, electronics test and armaments test were combined and became weapons test, and Lovell became the McDonnell Douglas F-4 Phantom II program manager. During this time future astronaut John Young served under him. In 1961, Lovell received orders for VF-101 "Detachment Alpha" at Naval Air Station Oceana in Virginia Beach, Virginia, as a flight instructor and safety engineering officer, and he completed Aviation Safety School at the University of Southern California.

== NASA career ==
=== Astronaut selection ===
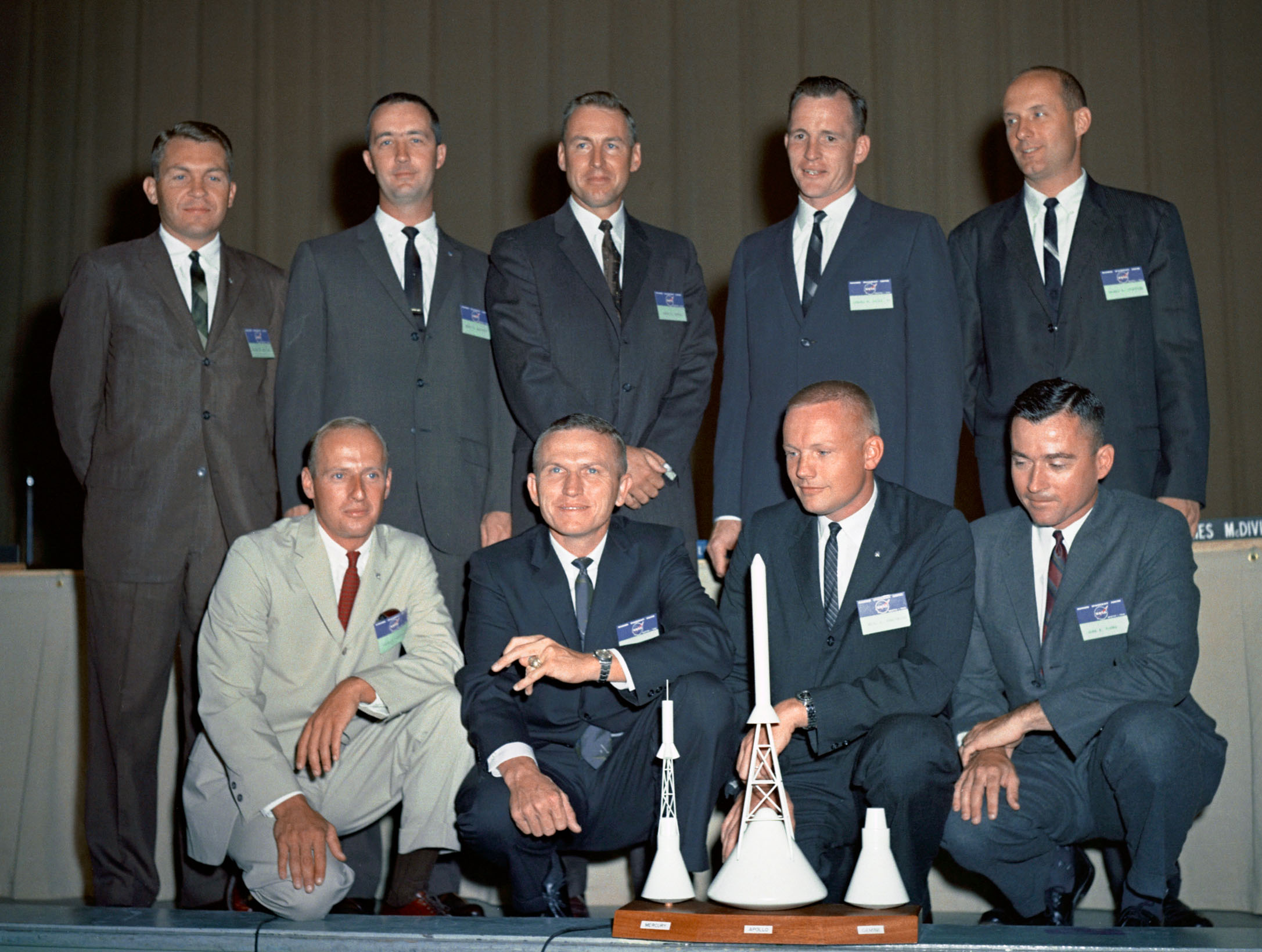
Group photo of NASA Astronaut Group 2; Lovell is in the center of the back row

In 1962, NASA began recruiting its second group of astronauts, intended to fly during the Gemini and Apollo programs. This time the process was a public one. Lovell found out about the selection from an advertisement that had been placed in Aviation Week & Space Technology, and decided to apply a second time. A three-person selection panel consisting of Mercury Seven astronauts Alan Shepard and Deke Slayton, and NASA test pilot Warren J. North, reduced the candidates to 32 finalists, who were sent to Brooks Air Force Base in San Antonio for medical examinations. The tests there were much the same as those employed to select the Mercury Seven, but this time Lovell passed. The remaining 27 then went to Ellington Air Force Base near Houston, where they were individually interviewed by the selection panel.

On September 14, Slayton informed Lovell that he had been accepted. To avoid tipping off the media, Lovell checked into the Rice Hotel in Houston under the name of Max Peck, its general manager. On September 17, the media crowded into the 1800-seat Cullen Auditorium at the University of Houston for the official announcement, but it wasn't as big as the unveiling of the Mercury Seven three years before. The group became known as the "Next Nine" or the "New Nine". The new astronauts moved to the Houston area in October 1962. Conrad and Lovell built houses in Timber Cove, south of the Manned Spacecraft Center (MSC). Developers in Timber Cove offered astronauts mortgages with small down payments and low interest rates. The MSC complex was not yet complete, so NASA temporarily leased office space in Houston.

The task of supervising the Next Nine's training fell to Mercury Seven astronaut Gus Grissom. Initially, each of the astronauts was given four months of classroom instruction on subjects such as spacecraft propulsion, orbital mechanics, astronomy, computing, and space medicine. Classes were for six hours a day, two days a week, and all sixteen astronauts had to attend. There was also familiarization with the Gemini spacecraft, Titan II and Atlas boosters, and the Agena target vehicle. Jungle survival training was conducted at the United States Air Force (USAF) Tropic Survival School at Albrook Air Force Station in the Panama Canal Zone, desert survival training at Stead Air Force Base in Nevada, and water survival training on the Dilbert Dunker at the USN school at Naval Air Station Pensacola and on Galveston Bay. Following the precedent set by the Mercury Seven, each of the Next Nine was assigned a special area in which to develop expertise that could be shared with the others, and to provide astronaut input to designers and engineers. Lovell became responsible for recovery systems.

=== Gemini program ===
==== Gemini 7 ====
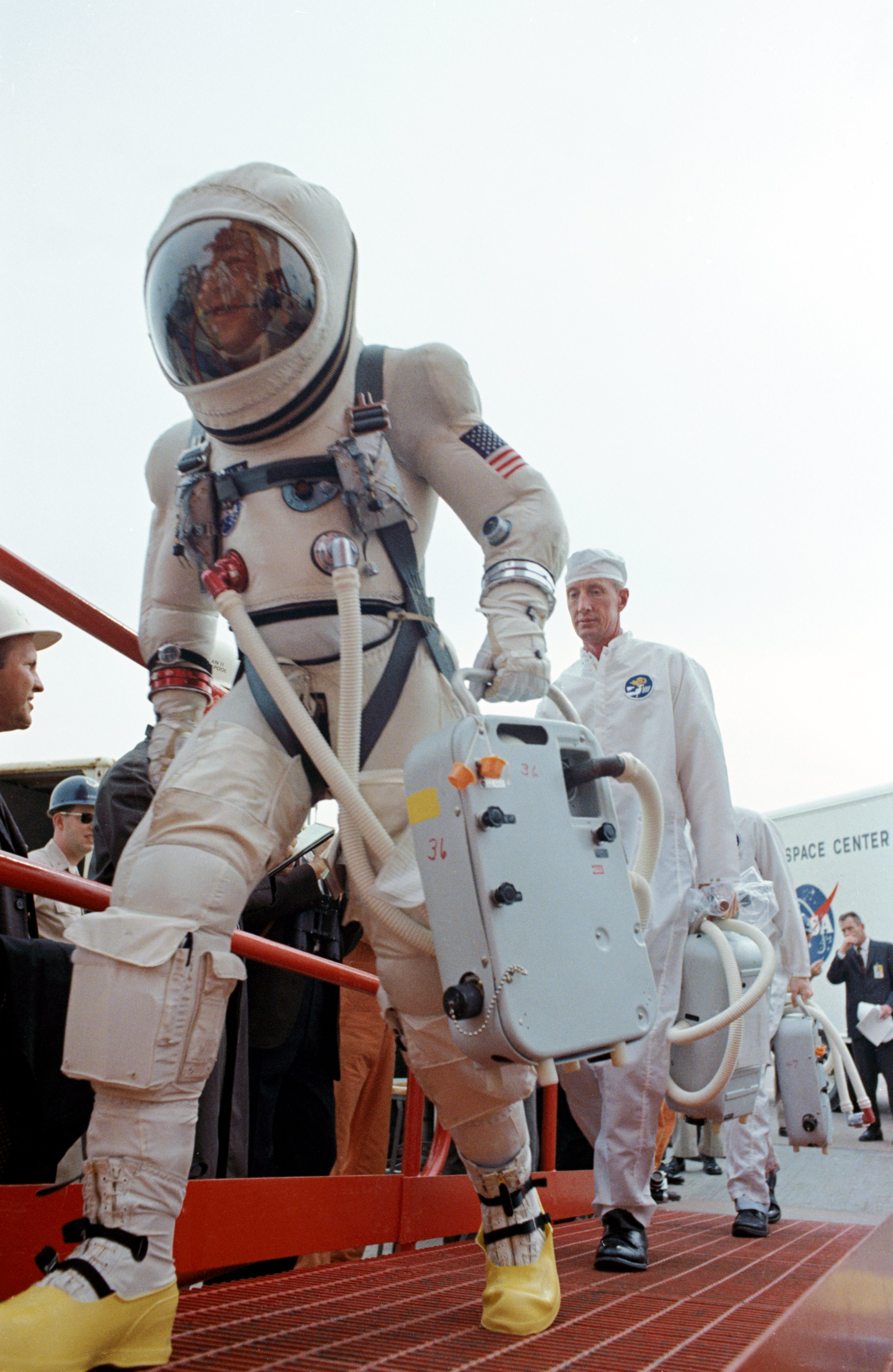
Lovell before the Gemini 7 launch in the special G5C spacesuit, which had a zippered hood with a visor instead of a solid helmet

Lovell was selected as backup pilot for Gemini 4, which was officially announced on July 29, 1964. It put him in position for his first space flight three missions later, as pilot of Gemini 7 with command pilot Frank Borman, under a rotation system devised by Slayton. Borman was a USAF officer, and Lovell had first met him during the evaluation process for astronaut selection. Their selection for the Gemini 7 mission was officially announced on July 1, 1965, along with that of Edward White and Michael Collins as their backup crew.

Like all Gemini missions, it was part of the preparations for Apollo. The flight's objective was to evaluate the effects on the crew and spacecraft from fourteen days in orbit, this being sufficiently long for any possible Moon mission, and would therefore enable doctors to evaluate the medical aspects of such a flight. The Gemini 6 mission preceding it was to demonstrate techniques for space rendezvous, also a critical requirement for Apollo. These techniques had been worked out by Dean F. Grimm and Buzz Aldrin, who had written his doctoral thesis on the subject.

The Gemini 6 mission, which was commanded by Schirra with Tom Stafford as pilot, had a serious setback on October 15, 1965, when the Agena target vehicle that Gemini 6 was supposed to rendezvous with exploded soon after takeoff. Lovell was present at the Launch Control Center at Cape Kennedy when this occurred. Officials from McDonnell, the manufacturer of the Gemini spacecraft, then raised the possibility of a rendezvous between Gemini 6 and Gemini 7 during the two weeks while Gemini 7 was in orbit. The only change to the latter's flight plan this required was to circularize its orbit to match that intended for the Agena target vehicle. Borman rejected a proposal by Schirra that Lovell and Stafford exchange places, on the grounds that it was hazardous and likely to jeopardize the fourteen-day mission objective through loss of oxygen.

In planning the mission, it was decided that both astronauts would sleep at the same time and observe the same work periods, one in the morning and one in the afternoon. Experiments were not scheduled, but fitted in when time allowed. Of the twenty experiments, eight were medical, aimed at gathering data about the effects of long-duration space flight. Of the rest, four were tests of spacecraft systems, five involved radiometry or navigation, and three involved photography and observation, To save space, the G5C spacesuit was designed to incorporate a soft hood instead of a helmet and zippers instead of a neck ring. It weighed a third less than the standard Gemini space suit and could be stowed more easily.

Gemini 7 lifted off on December 4, 1965, and reached its intended 300-kilometer (160 nmi; 180 mi) near-circular orbit. Lovell, who was taller than Borman, had more difficulty donning and removing his spacesuit. Mission rules required that one astronaut remain suited at all times, but the suits made the astronauts uncomfortably warm. Mission control eventually relented and allowed both to leave their suits off. Gemini 6, now called Gemini 6A, attempted to launch on December 12; the engines ignited, but shut down less than two seconds later due to an electrical problem and a fuel cap accidentally having been left in place. After repairs, Gemini 6A successfully lifted off on December 15, and rendezvoused with Gemini 7 on Gemini 6A's fourth orbit. The two spacecraft then flew in tandem for three orbits, the distance between them varying between 0.30 and 90 meters (1 and 300 ft). Gemini 6A returned to Earth on December 16.

In the final two days of the mission, Lovell had time to read part of Drums Along the Mohawk by Walter D. Edmonds. As in earlier long-duration flights, malfunctions accumulated as the flight wore on. Two of the thrusters stopped working. After the flight, this was traced to the fact that they had an old type of laminate in the thrust chamber instead of the new type that had been developed to solve this problem. This proved to be only an annoyance, but there was more concern over a loss of power in the fuel cells. By day thirteen, a warning light was illuminated continuously and it was feared that the cells, which were only giving partial output, might fail completely, and the mission might have to be cut short; tests were carried out in St. Louis that demonstrated that the batteries could sustain them for the remainder of the flight. Gemini 7 made a successful return from orbit on December 18. The fourteen-day flight set an endurance record, making 206 orbits.

==== Gemini 12 ====
On January 24, 1966, Lovell was named as the backup command pilot of Gemini 10, with Aldrin as the pilot. On March 21, this was changed as a result of the deaths of the Gemini 9 prime crew, Elliot See and Charles Bassett, in an air crash. The Gemini 9 backup crew of Tom Stafford and Gene Cernan became the prime crew of Gemini 9A, and Lovell and Aldrin became their backups. This positioned Lovell for his second flight and first command, of Gemini 12. Lovell and Aldrin's selection for this mission was officially announced on June 17, along with that of Gordon Cooper and Gene Cernan as their backups.

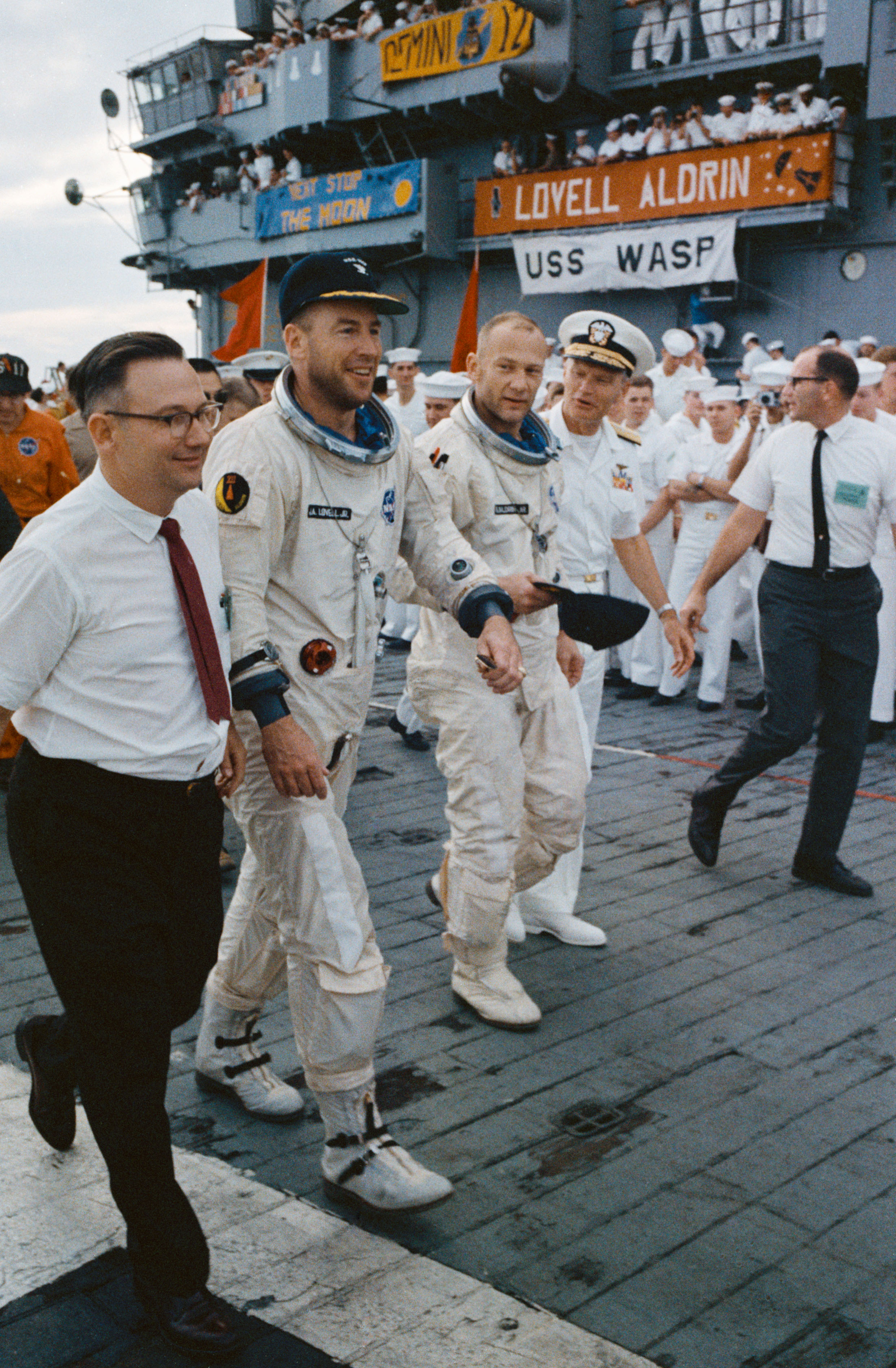
Lovell (second from left) and Buzz Aldrin (third from left) arrive aboard the recovery vessel, the aircraft carrier USS Wasp, after the Gemini 12 flight.

The goals of Gemini 12, the final Gemini mission, were ill-defined at first. "Essentially Gemini 12 didn't have a mission", Lovell later recalled. "It was, I guess, by default ... supposed to wind up the Gemini program and catch all those items that were not caught on previous flights." By July, its mission had become to master extravehicular activity (EVA), something that had proven problematic on earlier Gemini missions, as they had been more strenuous than expected and performing simple tasks had been more complicated. A series of innovations had been developed in response to the problems that had been encountered. It had been found that moving in space was similar to being underwater, and Aldrin made use of this new training technique. A waist restraint was provided on the space suit, and the Gemini spacecraft and the Agena target vehicle had additional handrails, handholds, and rings for tethering the waist restraint. Procedures were modified to minimize fatigue.

Gemini 12 lifted off on November 11, and quickly achieved orbit. Its first task was to rendezvous with its Agena target vehicle. This was complicated when the rendezvous radar set failed. Instead, Aldrin, who had written his PhD on the rendezvous, used a sextant to measure the angle between the spacecraft and the Agena, and then calculated the required actions using the onboard computer. Lovell then flew the spacecraft accordingly. Rendezvous was achieved, and Gemini successfully docked with the Agena, achieving the fifth space rendezvous and fourth space docking with an Agena target vehicle. Lovell then successfully undocked and docked again.

Aldrin performed three EVAs. The first was a standup EVA on November 12, in which the spacecraft door was opened and he stood up, but did not leave the spacecraft. The standup EVA mimicked some of the actions he would do during his free-flight EVA, so he could compare the effort expended between the two. It set an EVA record of two hours and twenty minutes. The next day Aldrin performed his free-flight EVA. He climbed across the newly installed hand-holds to the Agena and installed the cable needed for the gravity-gradient stabilization experiment. He performed several tasks, including installing electrical connectors and testing tools that would be needed for Apollo. The EVA concluded after two hours and six minutes. Before returning to the spacecraft, Aldrin cleaned the pilot's window with a cloth, and Lovell jokingly asked him if he could change the oil too. A third, 55-minute standup EVA was conducted on November 14, during which Aldrin took photographs, conducted experiments, and discarded some unneeded items.

Gemini 12 returned to Earth on November 15, after 59 orbits. During re-entry a pouch containing books and small pieces of equipment broke free and landed in Lovell's lap. He did not want to grab it, as he feared he might pull on the D-ring that activated the ejector seat. It did not move any further, and the landing went well. The spacecraft landed 5.6 kilometers (3 nmi; 3.5 mi) from the recovery ship, the aircraft carrier USS Wasp. Twelve experiments had been carried out. This mission proved that people could work effectively outside the spacecraft, which was required for the Apollo missions with the goal of getting man on the Moon by the end of the decade.

=== Apollo program ===
==== Apollo 1 ====
On January 27, 1967, Grissom, White and Roger Chaffee were killed in the Apollo 1 fire. At the time, Lovell was in Washington, D.C., where, along with fellow astronauts Neil Armstrong, Scott Carpenter, Gordon Cooper and Richard Gordon, he had attended the signing of the Outer Space Treaty and the reception afterwards in the Green Room of the White House hosted by President Lyndon Johnson. Four days later, Lovell flew to West Point, New York, with Borman in a NASA T-38 for the funeral service for White at the Old Cadet Chapel. After the service, White was laid to rest in the West Point Cemetery; Lovell served as a pallbearer along with Armstrong, Borman, Conrad, Stafford and Aldrin.

The Apollo command module was redesigned after the fire, and afterwards it underwent a series of qualification tests. In April 1968, Lovell, along with fellow astronauts Stuart Roosa and Charles Duke, spent 48 hours in command module CM-007A, bobbing in the Gulf of Mexico to test the seaworthiness of the Apollo spacecraft. The NASA research vessel MV Retriever stood by with technicians and divers, while the astronauts assessed how quickly the spacecraft's flotation devices could right it from the "stable II" (upside down) position. The urine collection hose was used to vacuum up water that entered the cabin. Although this did not seem to bother Lovell, Duke regarded it as his worst experience as an astronaut, and Roosa became quite seasick. The NASA Roundup newspaper wrote the event up under the headline, "Yo, Ho, Ho and a Bottle of Marezine", referencing the brand name of a motion sickness drug.

==== Apollo 8 ====
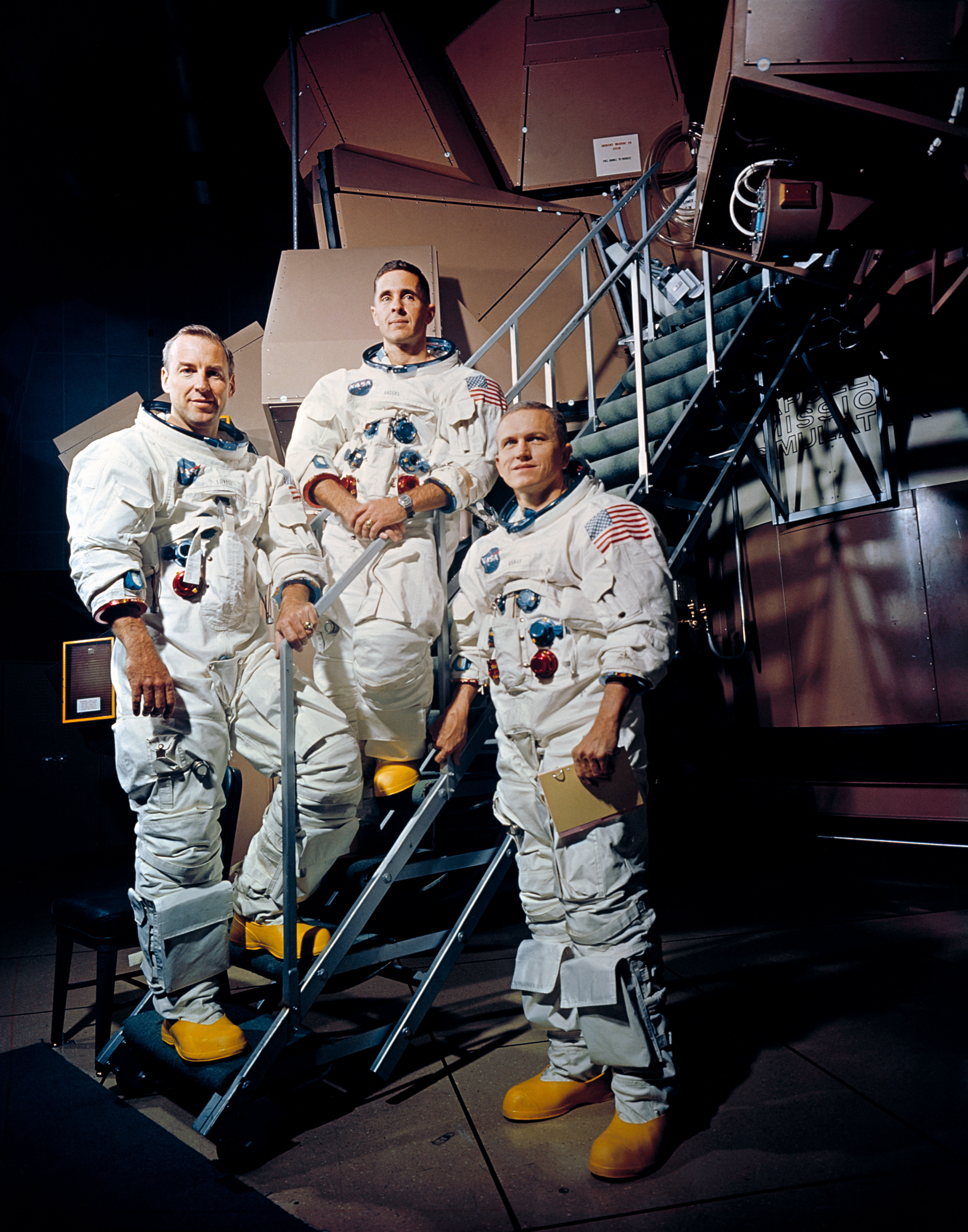
The Apollo 8 crew. Left to right: Lovell, William Anders and Frank Borman.

Lovell was originally chosen as command module pilot (CMP) on the backup crew for Apollo 9 along with Armstrong as commander (CDR) and Aldrin as lunar module pilot (LMP). Apollo 9 was planned as a high-apogee Earth orbital test of the Lunar Module (LM). Lovell later replaced Michael Collins as CMP on the Apollo 9 prime crew in July 1968 when Collins needed to have surgery for a bone spur on his spine. This reunited Lovell with his Gemini 7 commander Frank Borman, along with LMP William Anders. Aldrin became Lovell's backup CMP, and Fred Haise joined Armstrong's crew as LMP.

The Apollo 8 1968 Christmas Eve broadcast and reading from the Book of Genesis while in lunar orbit

Construction delays of the first crewed LM prevented it from being ready in time to fly on Apollo 8, planned as a low Earth orbit test. It was decided to swap the Apollo 8 and Apollo 9 prime and backup crews in the flight schedule so that the crew trained for the low-orbit test could fly it as Apollo 9, when the LM would be ready. A lunar orbital flight, now Apollo 8, replaced the original Apollo 9 medium Earth orbit test mission. The crew was informed of this decision on August 10, 1968, and the training schedule was adjusted accordingly. Starting in September, the crew spent ten hours a day in the simulator rehearsing the mission.

Apollo 8 was launched on December 21, 1968, and Borman, Lovell and Anders became the first crew to ride the Saturn V rocket, as well as the first to travel to the Moon. Their Apollo craft entered lunar orbit on December 24 (Christmas Eve) and reduced speed to go into a 10.9-by-312.1-kilometer (5.9 by 168.5 nmi; 6.8 by 193.9 mi) orbit. The engine was then fired again to enter a 111-kilometer (60 nmi; 69 mi) circular orbit around the Moon.

On Christmas Eve, the crew broadcast black-and-white television pictures of the lunar surface back to Earth. Lovell took his turn with Borman and Anders in reading a passage from the Biblical creation story in the Book of Genesis. They made a total of ten orbits of the Moon in 20 hours and ten minutes, and began their return to Earth on December 25 (Christmas Day) with a rocket burn made on the Moon's far side, out of radio contact with Earth. When contact was re-established, Lovell broadcast, "Please be informed, there is a Santa Claus."

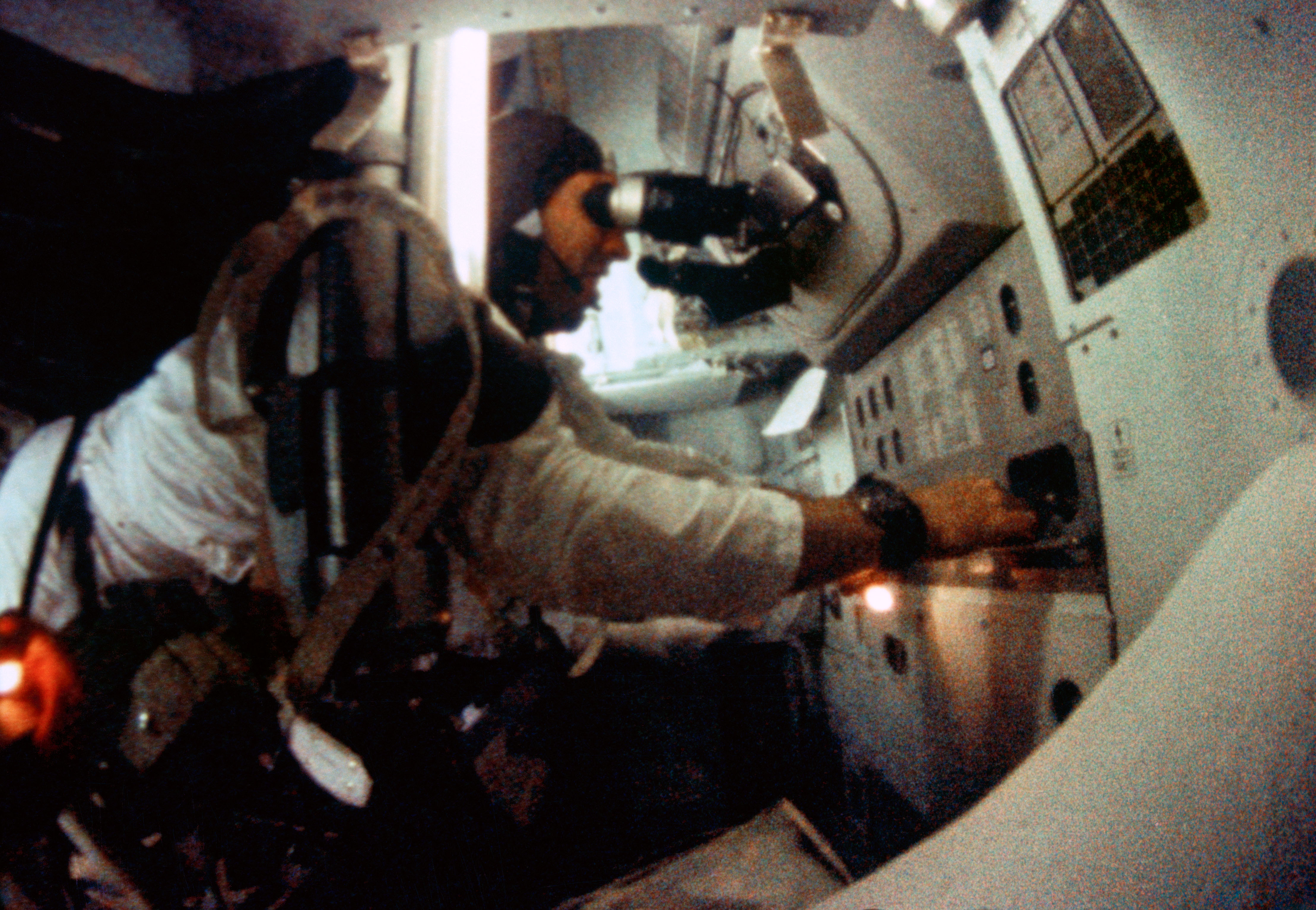
Lovell at the Command Module Guidance and Navigation station during the Apollo 8 mission

As CMP, Lovell served as navigator, using the spacecraft's sextant to determine its position by measuring star positions. These measurements were used to calculate required mid-course corrections. During otherwise idle time, he conducted navigational sightings, maneuvering the module to view stars and entering data via the Apollo Guidance Computer keyboard. During one of these data entries, Lovell accidentally erased some of the computer's memory by entering the wrong codes, causing the inertial measurement unit (IMU) to register the module as having the same orientation it did before liftoff. The IMU then initiated thruster firings to "correct" for this newly registered attitude.

After identifying the issue, the crew knew that they would have to reenter the orientation data. Lovell took about ten minutes to calculate the correct values, using the thrusters to align the stars Rigel and Sirius in the sextant, and another 15 minutes to enter the correct measurements into the computer. The experience later proved valuable during Apollo 13, when Lovell had to perform a similar manual realignment under critical conditions after the IMU had been turned off to conserve energy.

A feature on the Moon's surface (Mount Marilyn) was named by Lovell in honor of his wife.

The spacecraft splashed down safely before dawn on December 27 after 147 hours of flight, 4.8 kilometers (2.6 nmi; 3.0 mi) from the recovery ship, the aircraft carrier USS Yorktown. It was estimated that the crew had traveled 933,419 kilometers (504,006 nmi; 580,000 mi).

==== Apollo 13 ====
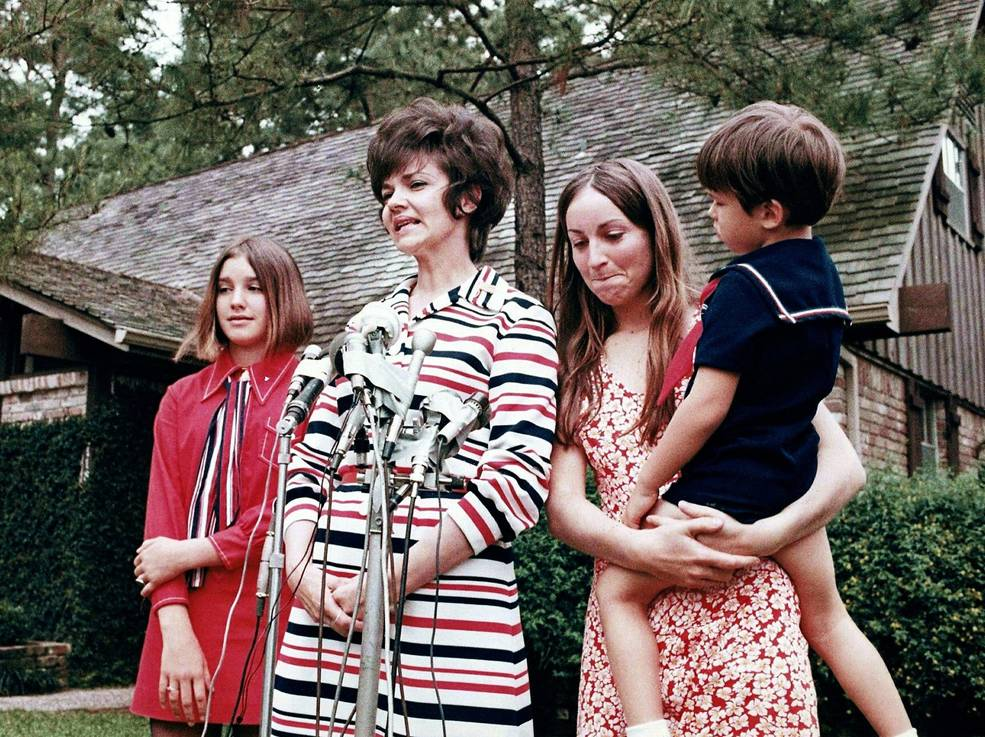
Marilyn Lovell and children Susan, Barbara and Jeffrey meet with reporters after the safe return of Apollo 13.

Lovell was backup CDR of Apollo 11, with Anders as CMP, and Haise as LMP. In early 1969, Anders accepted a job with the National Aeronautics and Space Council effective August 1969, and announced he would retire as an astronaut at that time. Ken Mattingly was moved from the support crew into parallel training with Anders as backup CMP in case Apollo 11 was delayed past its intended July launch date, at which point Anders would be unavailable.

Under the normal crew rotation in place during Apollo, Lovell, Mattingly, and Haise were scheduled to fly as the prime crew of Apollo 14, but George Mueller, the director of NASA's Office of Manned Space Flight, rejected Slayton's choice of fellow Mercury Seven astronaut Alan Shepard to command Apollo 13. Shepard had only recently returned to flight status after being grounded for several years, and Mueller thought that he needed more training time to prepare for a mission to the Moon. Slayton then asked Lovell if he was willing to switch places with Shepard's crew to give them more training time. "Sure, why not?" Lovell replied, "What could possibly be the difference between Apollo 13 and Apollo 14?"

There was one more change. Seven days before launch, a member of the Apollo 13 backup crew, Duke, contracted rubella from a friend of his son. This exposed both the prime and backup crews, who trained together. Of the five, only Mattingly was not immune through prior exposure. Normally, if any member of the prime crew had to be grounded, the remaining crew would be replaced as well, and the backup crew substituted, but Duke's illness ruled this out, so two days before launch, Mattingly was replaced by Jack Swigert from the backup crew. Mattingly never developed rubella and later flew to the Moon on Apollo 16.

Lovell lifted off aboard Apollo 13 on April 11, 1970. He and Haise were to land near the Fra Mauro crater. The Fra Mauro formation was believed to contain much material spattered by the impact that had filled the Imbrium basin early in the Moon's history, and dating it would provide information about the early history of the Earth and the Moon.

"We have a problem here", Swigert informed mission control.
"This is Houston, say again please," the capsule communicator, Jack Lousma, responded.
"Houston, we've had a problem," Lovell replied.

— Lovell & Kluger 1995, p. 95

During a routine liquid oxygen tank stir in transit to the Moon, a fire started inside an oxygen tank. The most probable cause determined by NASA was damaged electrical insulation on wiring that created a spark that started the fire. A problem with draining the tank had been reported before the mission, and Lovell had approved the action taken to turn on the heaters to purge the oxygen rather than to replace the faulty tank, which would have delayed the mission by a month. Neither he nor the launch pad crew were aware that the tank contained the wrong thermostat switch. The heaters were left on for eight hours, and while this successfully purged the oxygen, it also removed teflon insulation from the copper electrical wiring. Liquid oxygen rapidly turned into a high-pressure gas, which burst the tank and caused the leak of a second oxygen tank. In just over two hours, all onboard oxygen was lost, disabling the hydrogen fuel cells that provided electrical power to the Command/Service Module Odyssey.

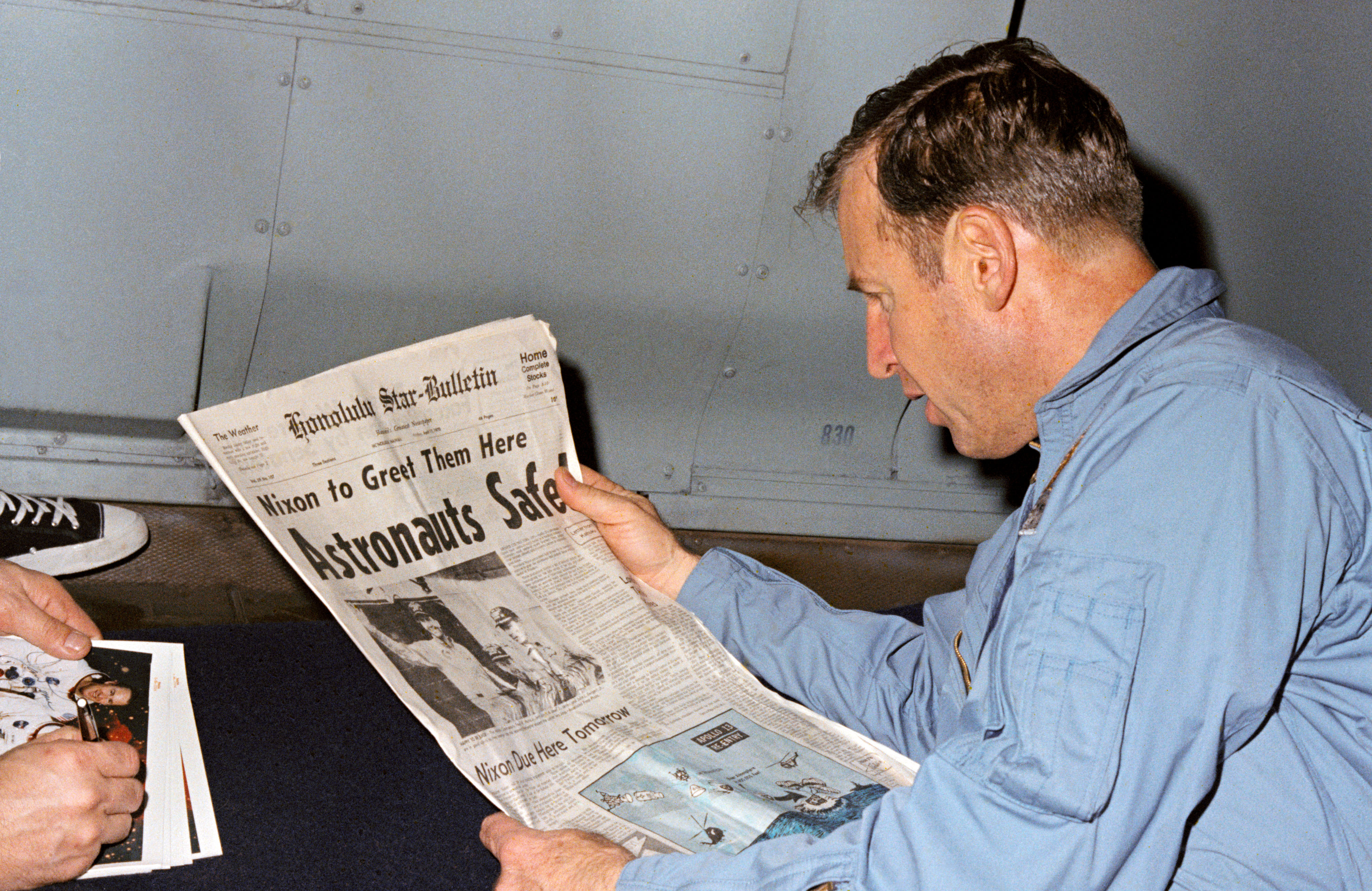
Lovell reads a newspaper account of Apollo 13's safe return aboard recovery vessel USS Iwo Jima.

Apollo 13 was the second mission not to use a free-return trajectory, so that they could explore the western lunar regions. Using the Apollo Lunar Module as a "life boat" providing battery power, oxygen, and propulsion, Lovell and his crew re-established the free return trajectory that they had left, and swung around the Moon to return home. Based on the flight controllers' calculations made on Earth, Lovell had to adjust the course twice by manually controlling the Lunar Module's thrusters and engine.

Apollo 13 returned safely to Earth on April 17. "I'm afraid", Lovell said, "this is going to be the last lunar mission for a long time." His comment was rebutted by NASA Administrator Thomas O. Paine, who hastened to reassure the public that NASA would be mounting more missions to the Moon. Nine months later, Apollo 14 would make the voyage to Fra Mauro, with modified oxygen tanks and an extra battery for emergencies.

As Lovell said to NASA's "Houston we Have a Podcast" in 2020: "You can't suddenly have a problem, and then just you know, close your eyes and then hope there's a miracle coming on, because a miracle is something you have to do yourself, or having people to help you."

Apollo 13's flight trajectory gave Lovell, Haise, and Swigert the record for the farthest distance that humans had ever traveled from Earth, which stood until the Artemis II lunar flyby in 2026. Lovell is one of only three men to reach the Moon twice, but unlike the other two, John Young and Gene Cernan, he never landed. He accrued 715 hours and 5 minutes in space flights on his Gemini and Apollo flights, a personal record that stood until the Skylab 3 mission in 1973.

== Later life and death ==
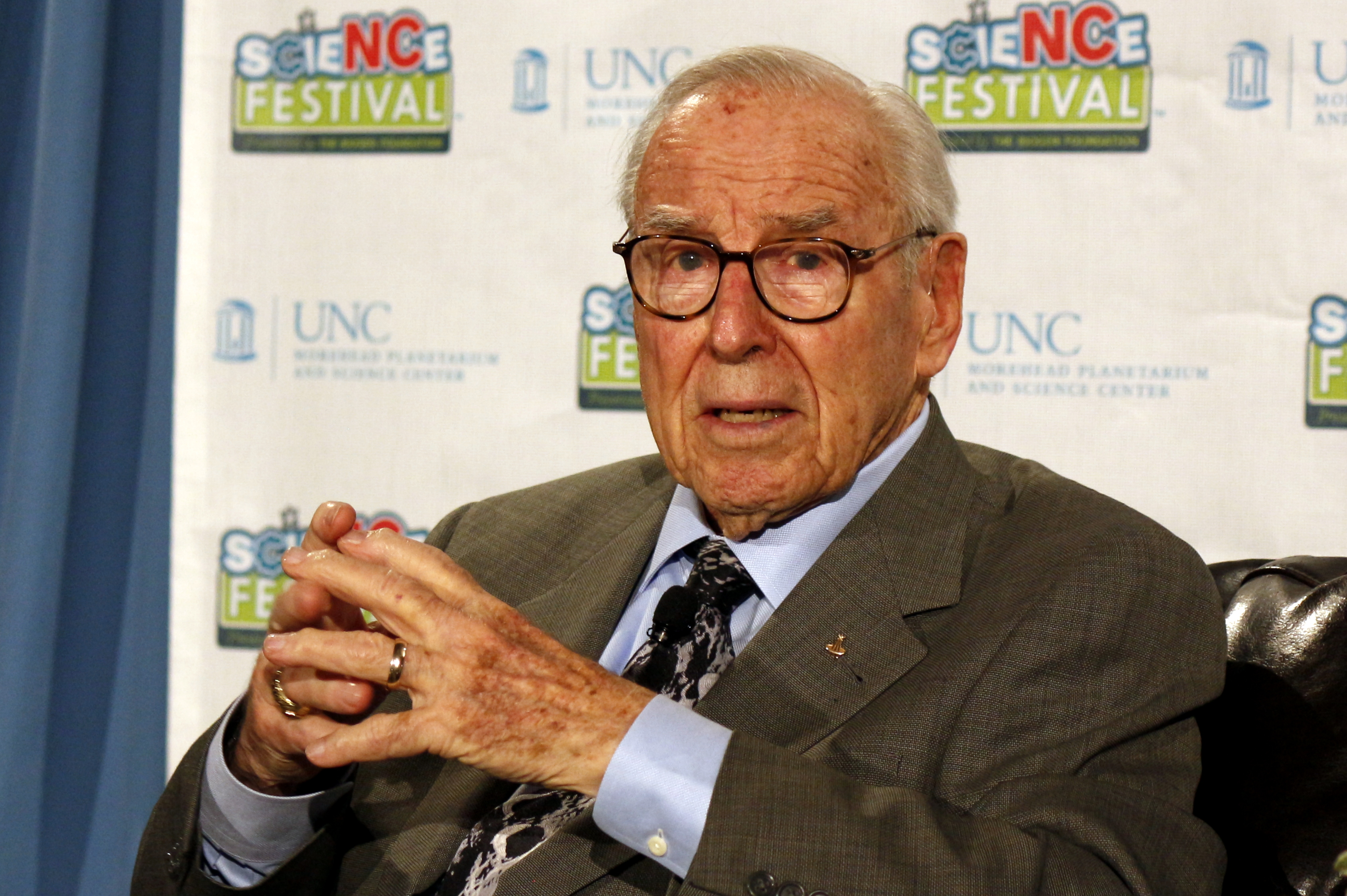
Lovell speaking at the North Carolina Science Festival in April 2017

Lovell retired from the Navy and the space program on March 1, 1973, and went to work at the Bay-Houston Towing Company in Houston, Texas, taking on the role of CEO in 1975. He became president of Fisk Telephone Systems in 1977, and later worked for Centel Corporation in Chicago, retiring as an executive vice president on January 1, 1991. Lovell was a recipient of the Distinguished Eagle Scout Award. He was also recognized by the Boy Scouts of America with their Silver Buffalo Award.

Lovell was on the board of directors for several organizations, including Federal Signal Corporation in Chicago from 1984 to 2003, the Astronautics Corporation of America in his hometown of Milwaukee from 1990 to 1999, and Centel from 1987 to 1991.

In 1999, the Lovell family opened a restaurant in Lake Forest, Illinois, "Lovell's of Lake Forest". The restaurant displayed memorabilia from Lovell's time with NASA and the filming of Apollo 13. The restaurant was sold to son and executive chef James ("Jay") in 2006. The restaurant was put on the market for sale in February 2014, and it closed in April 2015, the property being auctioned the same month.

Lovell's wife, Marilyn died of natural causes on August 27, 2023, at the age of 93. Lovell died on August 7, 2025, at his home in Lake Forest, Illinois, at the age of 97. He is buried next to Marilyn in the United States Naval Academy Cemetery in Annapolis, Maryland. On April 6, 2026, on Flight Day 6 of the Artemis II Mission, NASA played a special recorded audio message for the crew that Lovell had recorded prior to his death.

"Hello, Artemis II! This is Apollo astronaut Jim Lovell. Welcome to my old neighborhood! When Frank Borman, Bill Anders, and I orbited the Moon on Apollo 8, we got humanity's first up-close look at the Moon and got a view of the home planet that inspired and united people around the world. I'm proud to pass that torch on to you — as you swing around the Moon and lay the groundwork for missions to Mars … for the benefit of all. It's a historic day, and I know how busy you'll be. But don't forget to enjoy the view. So, Reid, Victor, Christina, and Jeremy, and all the great teams supporting you – good luck and Godspeed from all of us here on the good Earth."

— National Aeronautics and Space Administration radio transmission on April 6, 2026

== Awards and decorations ==
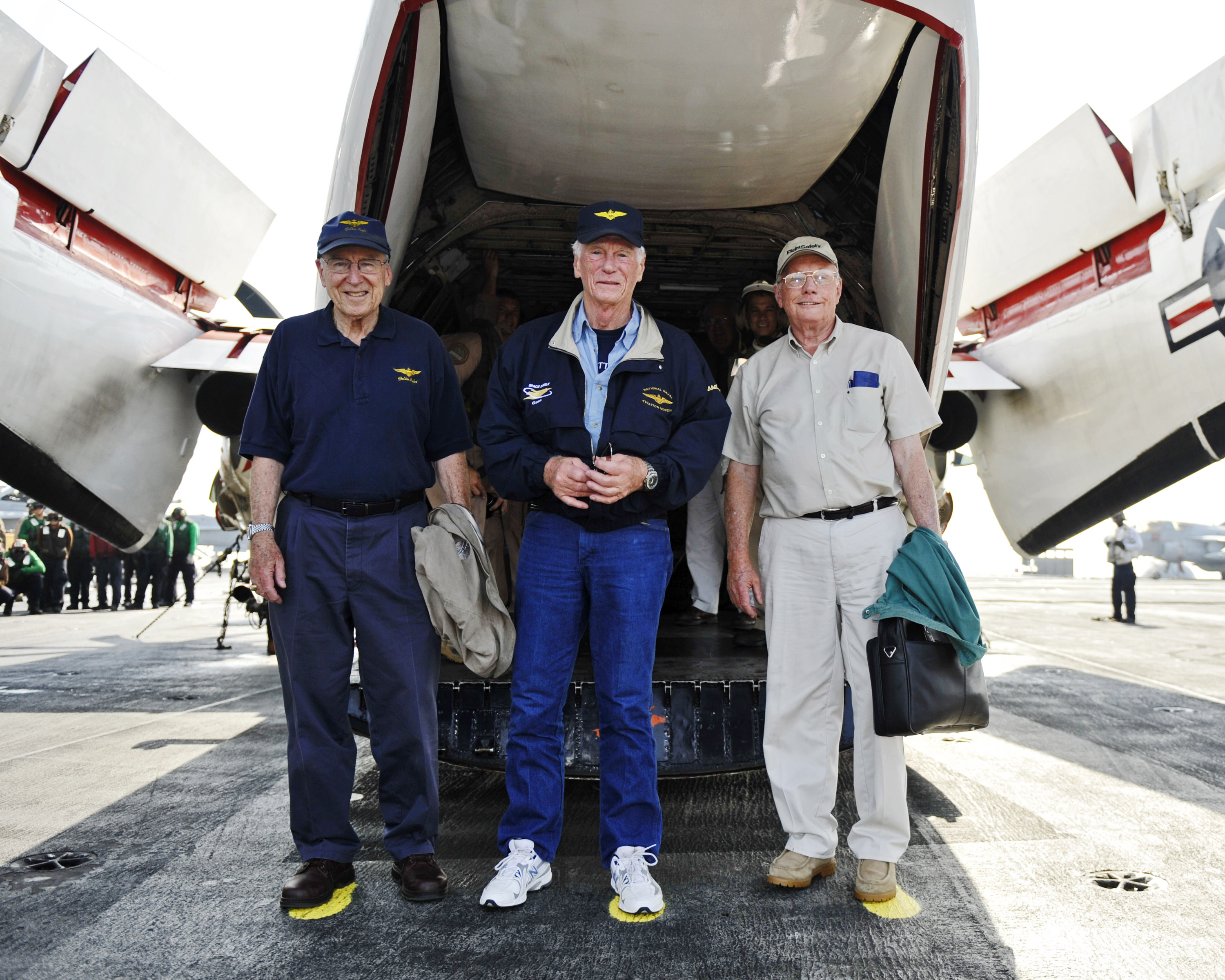
Lovell (left), Gene Cernan (center), and Neil Armstrong during the 2010 Legends of Aerospace tour aboard the aircraft carrier USS Harry S. Truman

Lovell's awards and decorations include:

=== Military, federal service, and foreign awards ===
- Navy Distinguished Service Medal with gold star
- Distinguished Flying Cross with gold star
- Presidential Medal of Freedom
- Congressional Space Medal of Honor
- NASA Distinguished Service Medal
- NASA Exceptional Service Medal with star
- Légion d'honneur (Chevalier)

=== Other awards and accomplishments ===
- Alpha Phi Omega Fall Pledge Class Namesake (1967)
- American Academy of Achievement Golden Plate Award (1968)
- Henry H. Arnold Trophy (1969)
- Institute of Navigation Award (1969)
- National Geographic Society's Hubbard Medal (1969)
- Fédération Aéronautique Internationale (FAI) De Laval Medal & Gold Space Medals (1971)
- Distinguished Eagle Scout Award (1990)
- Silver Buffalo (Boy Scouts of America) (1992)
- Space Foundation's General James E. Hill Lifetime Space Achievement Award (2003)
- NASA Ambassadors of Exploration Award (2009)
- Laureate of the Order of Lincoln—the highest honor awarded by the state of Illinois (2012)
- The Honourable Company of Air Pilots Award of Honour, presented by the then Duke of York (later Andrew Mountbatten-Windsor) in October 2013

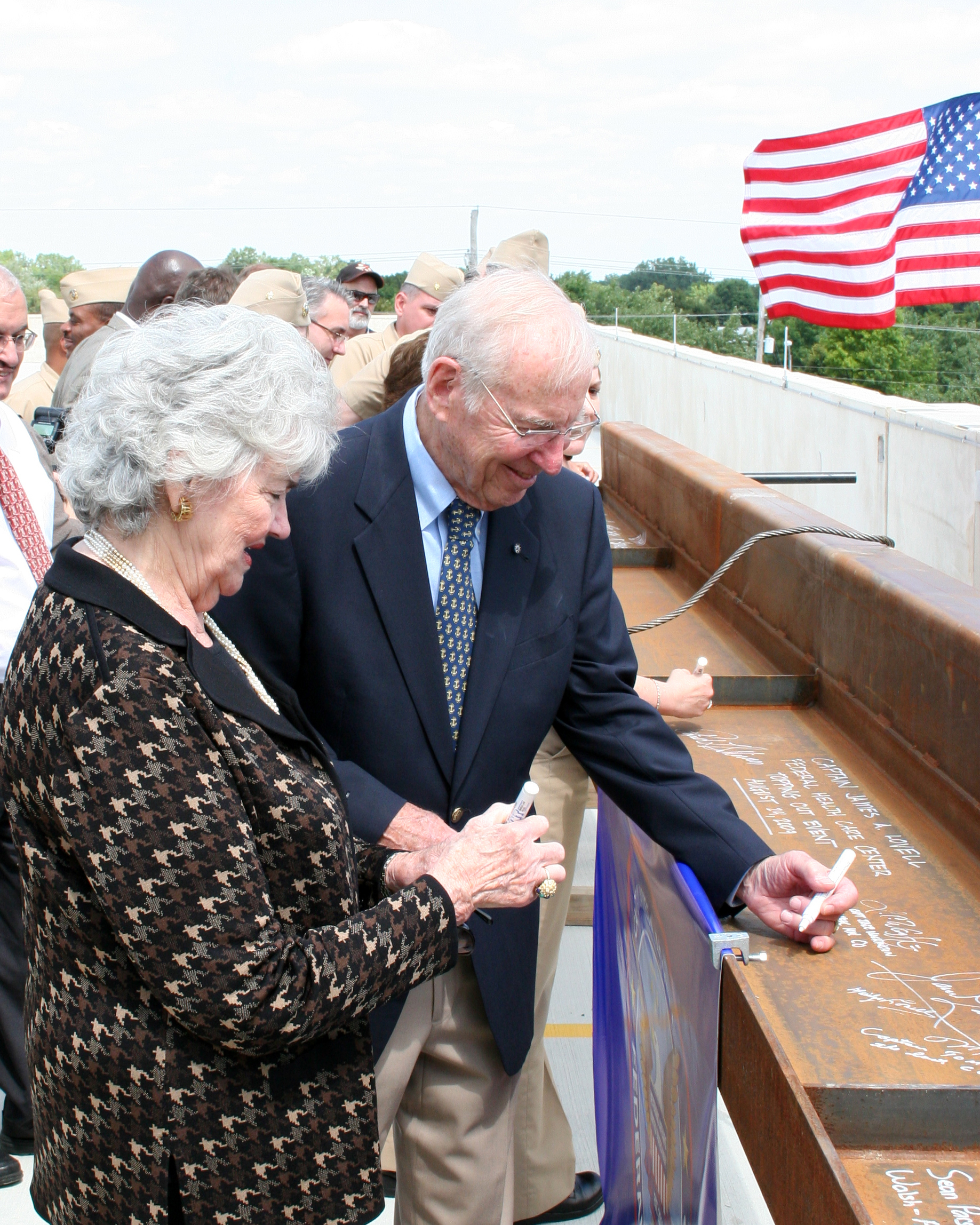
Lovell and his wife Marilyn in 2009

The Gemini 6 and 7 crews were awarded the Harmon International Trophy for 1966 in a ceremony at the White House. Lovell received a second Harmon International Trophy in 1967 when he and Aldrin were selected for their Gemini 12 flight. The Apollo 8 crew won the Robert J. Collier Trophy for 1968. President Richard Nixon awarded them the Dr. Robert H. Goddard Memorial Trophy in 1969, which Lovell accepted on behalf of the crew. The General Thomas D. White USAF Space Trophy is normally awarded to Air Force personnel, but an exception was made to include Lovell so that the entire Apollo 8 crew were awarded the 1968 trophy. Lovell was awarded a third Harmon International Trophy in 1969 for his role in the Apollo 8 mission. The Apollo 8 crew was also awarded the American Institute of Aeronautics and Astronautics (AIAA) Haley Astronautics Award for 1970, and were named Time Magazine Men of the Year in 1968. The Apollo 7, 8, 9, and 10 crews were awarded the National Academy of Television Arts and Sciences Special Trustees Award for 1969.

Lovell was one of ten Gemini astronauts inducted into the International Space Hall of Fame in 1982, and, along with the other 12 Gemini astronauts, Lovell was inducted into the second U.S. Astronaut Hall of Fame class in 1993. At a parade attended by 500,000 people, Lovell was conferred Chicago's medal of merit. The Apollo 13 crew was awarded the City of New York Gold Medal, but Lovell had already received it for the Apollo 8 mission. In lieu of a second medal, the mayor gifted him a crystal paperweight that he "invented for the occasion". He was also awarded the 1970 City of Houston Medal for Valor for the mission. He was awarded his second Haley Astronautics Award for his role on Apollo 13.

Lovell was featured on the cover of Time magazine on January 3, 1969, and April 27, 1970, and on the cover of Life magazine on April 24, 1970.

Lovell was a recipient of the University of Wisconsin's Distinguished Alumni Service Award in 1970. In his acceptance speech he emphasized the use of words over "rock throwing" to help attain political goals. He was awarded an honorary doctor of science degree at Western Michigan University's summer commencement exercises in 1970. He was also awarded an honorary doctor of laws degree at William Paterson College's commencement exercises in 1974. Lovell was also granted an honorary doctor of science degree from University of Wisconsin–Madison, his original alma mater, speaking at the December 2016 commencement.

=== Tributes ===
A small crater on the far side of the Moon was named Lovell in his honor in 1970. Discovery World in Milwaukee was renamed The James Lovell Museum of Science, Economics and Technology. It was at the time located on James Lovell St., also named for Lovell. The Captain James A. Lovell Federal Health Care Center was completed in October 2010, merging the Naval Health Clinic Great Lakes and the North Chicago Veterans Affairs Medical Center.

Tom Hanks paid him a tribute following his death, saying "There are people who dare, who dream, and who lead others to places we would not go on our own. Jim Lovell [...] was that kind of guy." Interim NASA administrator Sean Duffy attributed Lovell's "calm strength under pressure" as having helped the Apollo 13 crew return safely to Earth.

=== Organizations ===
- Trustee of the National Space Institute
- Chairman of the National Eagle Scouts Association
- Fellow in the Society of Experimental Test Pilots
- Lovell was a Life-Trustee of the Adler Planetarium, and donated many of his personal effects to the Planetarium's Collection, which are displayed in an exhibit.
- Trustee of Lake Forest College

== In popular culture ==
About a month after Apollo 13 returned to Earth, Lovell and his crewmates, Fred Haise and Jack Swigert, appeared on The Tonight Show with host Johnny Carson. In 1976, Lovell made a cameo appearance in the Nicolas Roeg film The Man Who Fell to Earth.

Lovell and Jeffrey Kluger wrote a 1994 book about the Apollo 13 mission, Lost Moon: The Perilous Voyage of Apollo 13, which Ron Howard adapted into the 1995 film Apollo 13. Lovell's first impression on being approached about the film was that Kevin Costner would be a good choice to portray him, given the physical resemblance, but Tom Hanks was cast in the role. To prepare, Hanks visited James and Marilyn Lovell at their home in Texas and flew with Lovell in his private airplane. Kathleen Quinlan was nominated for a supporting actress Oscar for her performance as Marilyn.

In the film, Lovell has a cameo as the captain of USS Iwo Jima. He can be seen as the naval officer shaking Hanks' hand, as Hanks speaks in voice-over, in the scene where the astronauts come aboard the Iwo Jima. The filmmakers offered to make Lovell's character an admiral aboard the ship, but Lovell said: "I retired as a captain and a captain I will be." He was cast as the ship's skipper, Captain Leland Kirkemo. Along with his wife Marilyn, who also has a cameo in the film, Lovell provided a commentary track on both the single disc and the two-disc special edition DVD.

Tim Daly portrayed Lovell in the 1998 HBO miniseries From the Earth to the Moon, and Pablo Schreiber played him in the 2018 film about Armstrong, First Man.

== Notes ==
- Brooks, Courtney G.; Grimwood, James M.; Swenson, Loyd S. Jr. (1979). Chariots for Apollo: A History of Manned Lunar Spacecraft (PDF). NASA History Series. Washington, D.C.: Scientific and Technical Information Branch, NASA. ISBN 978-0-486-46756-6. LCCN 79001042. OCLC 4664449. NASA SP-4205. Archived (PDF) from the original on January 5, 2021.
- Burgess, Colin (2011). Selecting the Mercury Seven: The Search for America's First Astronauts. New York: Springer. ISBN 978-1-4419-8405-0. OCLC 905280431.
- Burgess, Colin (2013). Moon Bound: Choosing and Preparing NASA's Lunar Astronauts. Springer-Praxis books in space exploration. New York: Springer. ISBN 978-1-4614-3854-0. OCLC 905162781.
- Chaikin, Andrew (2007). A Man on the Moon: The Voyages of the Apollo Astronauts. London: Penguin Books. ISBN 978-0-14-311235-8. OCLC 1120564779.
- Ertel, Ivan D.; Newkirk, Roland W.; Brooks, Courtney G. (1978). The Apollo Spacecraft: A Chronology (PDF). Vol. IV. Washington, D.C.: NASA. LCCN 69060008. OCLC 23818. NASA SP-4009. Archived (PDF) from the original on December 25, 2017.
- Glenday, Craig, ed. (2010). Guinness World Records 2010. New York: Bantam Books. ISBN 978-0-553-59337-2. OCLC 859600014.
- Goldberg, Jan (2003). James Lovell: The Rescue of Apollo 13. New York: The Rosen Publishing Group. ISBN 978-0-8239-4459-0. OCLC 52775126.
- Hacker, Barton C.; Grimwood, James M. (2010) [1977]. On the Shoulders of Titans: A History of Project Gemini (PDF). NASA History Series. Washington, D.C.: NASA History Division, Office of Policy and Plans. ISBN 978-0-16-067157-9. OCLC 945144787. NASA SP-4203. Archived (PDF) from the original on December 25, 2017.
- Hansen, James R. (2012). First Man: The Life of Neil A. Armstrong. New York: Simon & Schuster. ISBN 978-1-4767-2781-3. OCLC 1029741947.
- Harland, David (1999). Exploring the Moon: The Apollo Expeditions. London; New York: Springer. ISBN 978-1-85233-099-6. OCLC 982158259.
- Hintz, Martin (2000). Wisconsin Portraits: 55 People who Made a Difference. Black Earth, Wisconsin: Big Earth Publishing. ISBN 978-0-915024-80-3. OCLC 44508414.
- Kluger, Jeffrey (2017). Apollo 8: The Thrilling Story of the First Mission to the Moon. New York: Henry Holt. ISBN 978-1-62779-832-7. OCLC 1055851709.
- Kluger, Jeffrey & Lovell, Jim (July 1995). Lost Moon: The Perilous Voyage of Apollo 13. New York: Pocket Books. ISBN 0-671-53464-5. OCLC 1053909345.
- Koppel, Lily (2013). The Astronaut Wives Club. New York: Grand Central Publishing. ISBN 978-1-4555-0325-4. OCLC 816563627.
- Lovell, Jim; Kluger, Jeffrey (1995). Apollo 13: Lost Moon. New York: Pocket Books. ISBN 978-0-671-53464-6. OCLC 977928719.
- Moseley, Willie G. (2011). Smoke Jumper, Moon Pilot. Morley, Missouri: Acclaim Press. ISBN 978-1-935001-76-8. OCLC 777483366.
- Houston, We've Got a Problem (PDF). Washington, D.C.: NASA Office of Public Affairs. 1970. EP-76. Archived (PDF) from the original on September 4, 2021.
- Orloff, Richard W. (2000). Apollo by the Numbers: A Statistical Reference. NASA History Series. Washington, D.C.: NASA History Division, Office of Policy and Plans. ISBN 978-0-16-050631-4. LCCN 00061677. OCLC 829406439. NASA SP-2000-4029. Archived from the original on June 6, 2013.
- Reichl, Eugen [in German] (2016). Project Gemini. America in Space. Atglen, Pennsylvania: Schiffer Publishing. ISBN 978-0-7643-5070-2. OCLC 1026725515.
- Science and Technology Division, Library of Congress (1972). Astronautics and Aeronautics: Chronology of Science, Technology, and Policy, 1970 (PDF). Washington, DC: NASA. SP-4015. Archived (PDF) from the original on September 26, 2012.
- Slayton, Donald K. "Deke"; Cassutt, Michael (1994). Deke! U.S. Manned Space: From Mercury to the Shuttle (1st ed.). New York: Forge. ISBN 978-0-312-85503-1. OCLC 824183066.
- Thompson, Neal (2004). Light This Candle: The Life & Times of Alan Shepard, America's First Spaceman (1st ed.). New York: Crown Publishers. ISBN 0-609-61001-5. LCCN 2003015688. OCLC 52631310.
- Townley, Alvin (December 26, 2006). Legacy of Honor: The Values and Influence of America's Eagle Scouts. New York: St. Martin's Press. ISBN 978-0-312-36653-7. OCLC 890206472.
- Wolfe, Tom (1979). The Right Stuff. New York: Farrar, Straus, and Giroux. ISBN 978-0-553-27556-8. OCLC 849889526.

Preceded by Frank Borman	Oldest living American astronaut November 7, 2023 – August 7, 2025	Succeeded by Buzz Aldrin
