= Capitol Technology University =

Private university in South Laurel, Maryland, US

- Former names: Capitol Radio Engineering Institute (1927–1964), Capitol Institute of Technology (1964–1987), Capitol College (1987–2014)
- Motto: Aut viam inveniam aut faciam
- Motto in English: Either find a way or make one
- Type: Private university
- Established: June 1, 1927
- Accreditation: MSCHE
- Academic affiliations: Space-grant
- Endowment: $5.3 million
- President: Bradford L. Sims
- Students: 823 (Fall 2022)
- Undergraduates: 301 (Fall 2022)
- Postgraduates: 522 (Fall 2022)
- Location: South Laurel, Maryland, United States; 39.0475°N 76.8515°W
- Campus: Suburban, 52 acres (21 ha)
- Colors: Red; Black
- Website: www.captechu.edu

Capitol Technology University (formerly Capitol College) is a private university in South Laurel, Maryland, near Washington, DC. The university was founded in 1927 as the Capitol Radio Engineering Institute by a former US Navy Radioman. CREI changed its name to Capitol Institute of Technology in 1964, changed its name again to Capitol College in 1987, and Capitol Technology University in 2014. Capitol offers undergraduate and graduate programs specializing in engineering, computer science, information technology, and business. It is classified among "D/PU: Doctoral/Professional Universities" and is a National Center of Academic Excellence in Information Assurance Education.

== History ==
=== Capitol Radio Engineering Institute ===
Capitol Technology University was founded in 1927 as the Capitol Radio Engineering Institute, a correspondence school, by Eugene H. Rietzke, a United States Navy veteran Radioman (Master Chief). Five years later, in 1932, a residence division was opened, allowing students to reside at the school and study in laboratories. This facility remained at the corner of 16th Street NW and Park Road in Washington, D.C. for 30 years. In 1946, following World War II, the institute was accredited by the Engineers' Council for Professional Development (ECPD), which is now ABET, Inc.

In 1964, it sold its correspondence school division (which comprised 20% of its business) and the Capitol Radio Engineering Institute name, to McGraw-Hill Continuing Education Center. The residential school took the name Capitol Institute of Technology.

=== Capitol Institute of Technology ===
In 1964, the Institute changed its name to the Capitol Institute of Technology to reflect its expansion during the 1950s. That same year, it sold its correspondence school division, which comprised 20% of its business, to McGraw-Hill Education. Shortly thereafter, in 1966, the District of Columbia licensed the institute to award Bachelor of Science degrees in engineering technology. Anticipating the need for more space, the Institute decided to move to a leased facility in Kensington, Maryland, in 1969, which opened in January 1970. Six years later, in 1976, the Middle States Commission on Higher Education (MSCHE) awarded full accreditation to the institute.

After receiving regional accreditation, the Institute started to receive Federal and State grants for the purchase and construction of a new campus at the site of the former Beltsville Speedway (a.k.a. Baltimore-Washington Speedway), selected in 1980 and completed in September 1983. Over the next few years, new degree programs were introduced, the cooperative education program was expanded, new construction was well underway, and The Decade of Growth Campaign exceeded its $3.5 million goal. In 1986, Telecommunications Hall and the 340-seat Avrum Gudelsky Memorial Auditorium were completed.

=== Capitol College ===
A year later, in 1987, the Board of Trustees approved an extensive Five-Point Plan. This plan involved changing the school's name to Capitol College, developing new curricula in electrical engineering and telecommunications, creating student housing on campus, and moving from a quarter system to a semester system. In January 1989, six apartment-style residence halls were completed, named after various inventors: Bell, De Forest, Edison, Franklin, Morse, and Steinmetz. In August 1990, the Graduate School was created to offer the college's first Master's degrees in systems management, similar to a degree offered at the time by the U.S.C. Institute of Safety and Systems Management..

Over the following seven years, the college expanded its graduate degree offerings, partnered with NASA to offer preparatory summer courses in engineering for minority students, developed a Distance Learning Center, and opened the renovated Puente Library, also housing the McGowan Center for Innovative Teaching. In 1997, the college offered its first courses online over the Internet. Since then, new undergraduate and graduate programs have been introduced, the Space Operations Institute was established and expanded, the McGowan Academic Center was constructed, and enrollment has increased.

In 2003, Capitol was designated a National Security Agency Center of Academic Excellence in Information Assurance Education.

=== Capitol Technology University ===
In 2010, Capitol launched its first doctoral degree program. The Doctor of Science (Sc.D. or DSc) in Cybersecurity is offered using a combination of live online and on-campus residency courses to students around the world, and is designed for professionals employed full-time who are seeking an education that will allow them to perform as senior leaders, program developers and policy makers in the cybersecurity field. Students attend three residencies at the Laurel campus throughout the program. The university also has several doctoral programs including Ph.D.s in Technology, Manufacturing, Construction Science, Occupational Health & Safety, and Aviation.

In mid-2014, the institution was redesignated a university by the state of Maryland and changed its name to Capitol Technology University.

As of June 1, 2017, Dr. Bradford L. Sims is the university's eighth president.

== Academics ==
Capitol offers numerous undergraduate and graduate degree programs as Bachelor of Science, Master of Science, Doctor of Science and Doctor of Philosophy degrees. The university is accredited by the Middle States Commission on Higher Education. The Computer Science, Cybersecurity, Astronautical Engineering, Computer Engineering, and Electrical Engineering programs are accredited by ABET.

In 2026, SmartAsset ranked it No. 9 on its list of "America's Best Value Small Colleges and Universities".
