= Mount Marilyn =

Mountain on the Moon

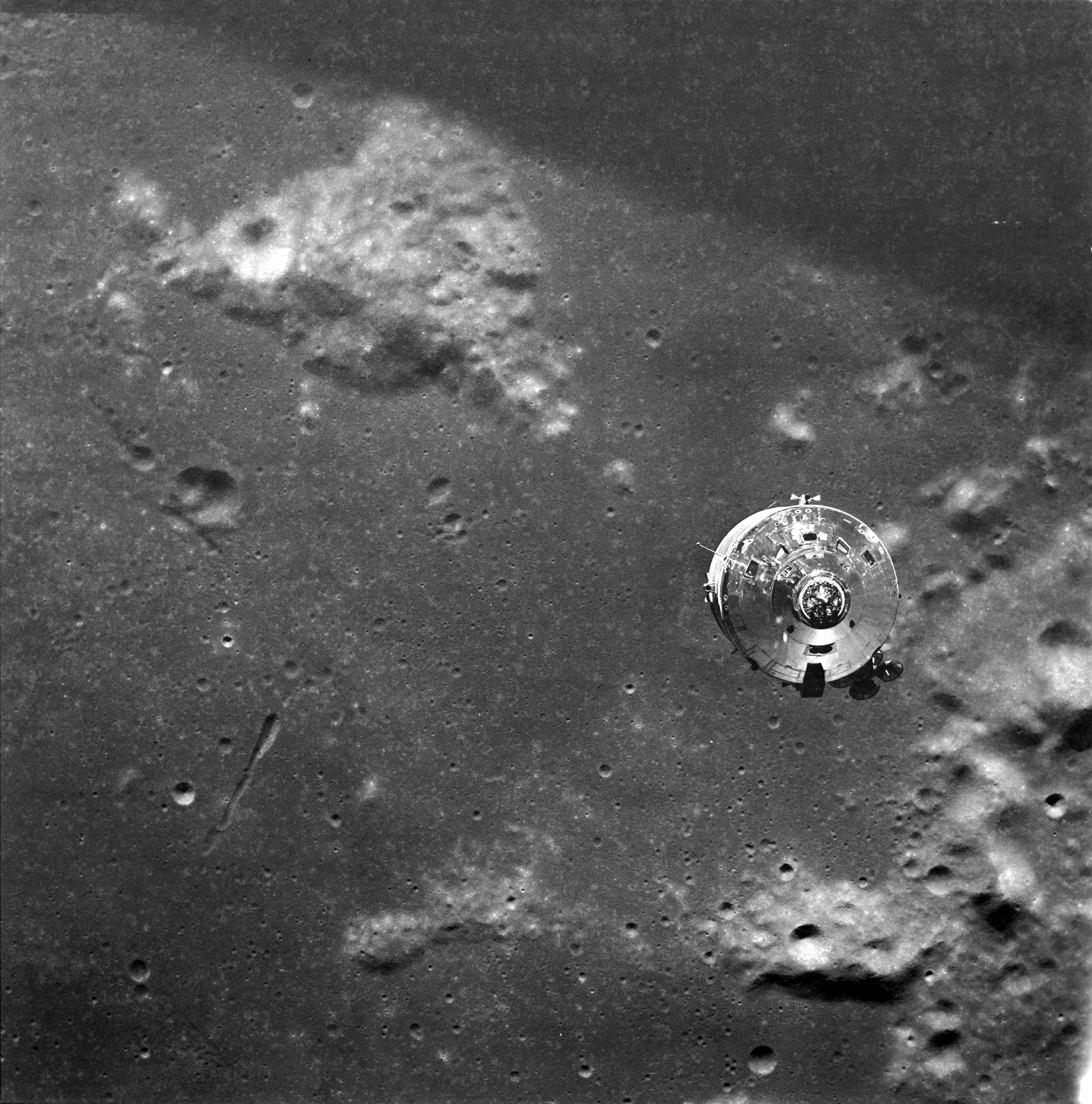
- Mount Marilyn (top left) with the Apollo 10 CSM in the foreground
- Location: Montes Secchi, between Mare Fecunditatis and Mare Tranquillitatis
- Coordinates: 1.13°N 40.00°E
- Eponym: Marilyn Lovell

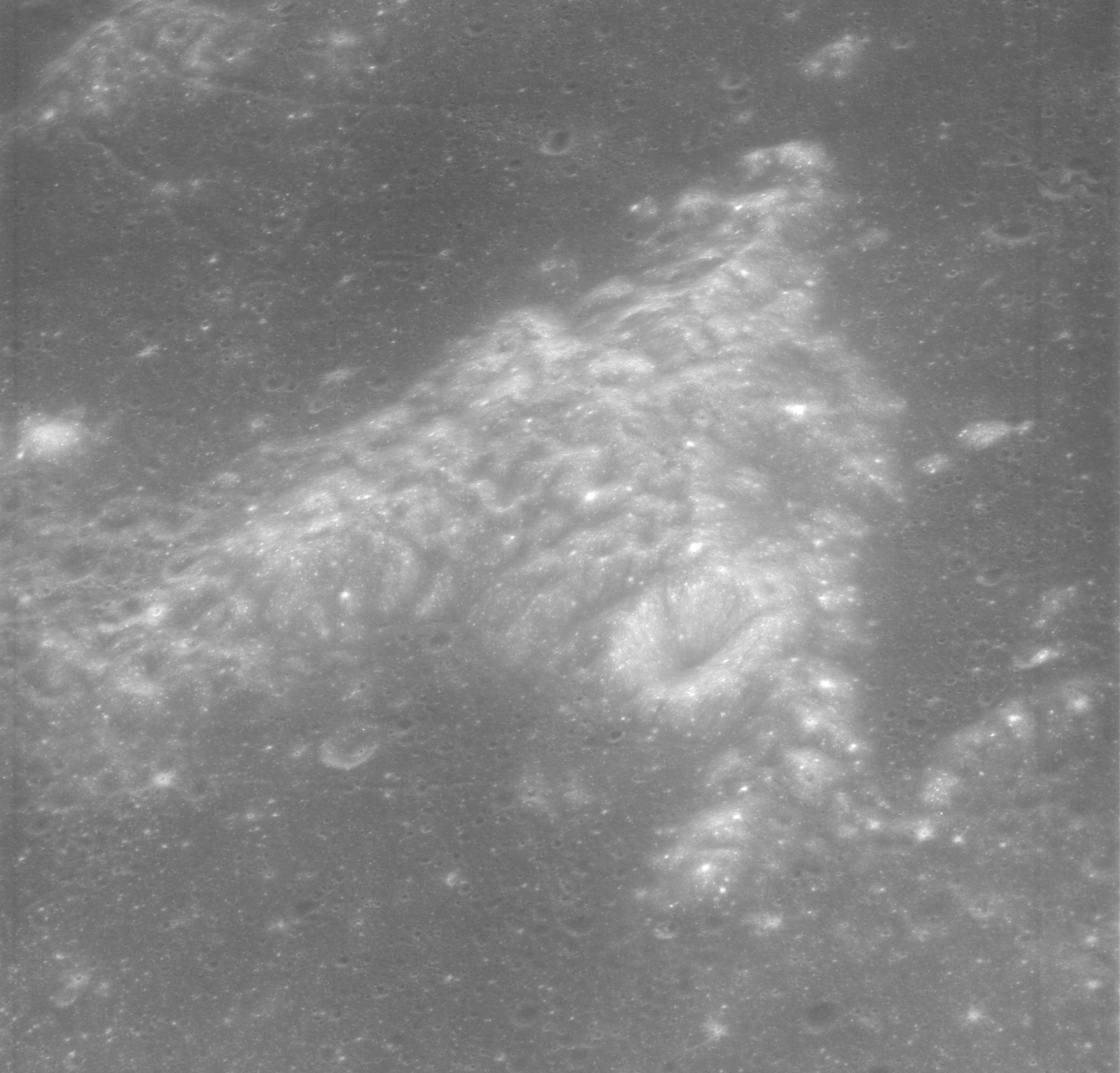
Oblique view from Apollo 15, facing south.

Mount Marilyn (Secchi theta) is a lunar mountain within the Montes Secchi, which separate Mare Fecunditatis to the east from Mare Tranquillitatis to the west. It was named by astronaut Jim Lovell for his wife, Marilyn, at about the time of the Apollo 8 mission to the Moon in 1968. The name was informal until July 26, 2017, when it was officially recognized by the International Astronomical Union. Its approximate position is 40.0°E, 1.1°N.

The small crater at the north tip of Mount Marilyn is known as Secchi O crater. The small crater unofficially known as Weatherford (probably because Apollo 10 Commander Tom Stafford was from Weatherford, Oklahoma) is located just west of the north tip.

The mountain is mentioned in the 1995 film Apollo 13, where Jim Lovell (portrayed by Tom Hanks) shows his wife (and namesake of the mountain) Marilyn Lovell (Portrayed by Kathleen Quinlan) where the mountain is.
