= U.S.C. Institute of Safety and Systems Management =

The Institute of Safety and Systems Management at the University of Southern California operated from 1952 to 1992. It was the first academic degree program in the United States that offered degrees in safety, human factors, and systems management. It offered extensive coursework in aviation safety, and was the National Institute of Occupational and Safety and Health's (NIOSH) Educational Resource Center in Southern California from 1979 to 1992. A large number of I.S.S.M. graduate students were funded with NIOSH fellowships, a number were supported by military and aerospace companies (of which there were many in Southern California at the time). The Institute of Safety and Systems Management closed in 1997 after over forty years of operation as a result of a USC strategic study.

== History ==
The Institute began in 1952 when the United States Air Force worked with the University of Southern California to develop more scientific safety practices using a systems approach, especially as related to aviation safety and complex systems. The program expanded into a full range of occupational safety, industrial hygiene, aviation safety, systems safety, human factors, Information Systems, and hazardous waste management programs. Short courses were also offered in addition to the academic courses.

== Degrees offered ==
The institute offered B.S., M.S., and Ph.D. programs. In 1963 the first graduate degree program for active military personnel in Europe was introduced, the Master's of Science in Aerospace Operations Management. This evolved into the Master's in Systems Management. The systems curriculum was expanded in 1970 as the need for systems management as applied to many disciplines, including management, became clear. In 1977-1978 the Master's of Science in Industrial Hygiene and Master's of Science in Occupational Health were implemented.

The Institute was divided into the Human Factors Department, the Safety Science Department, and the Systems Management Department.

== Worldwide operations ==
The I.S.S.M. developed a worldwide campus structure that was operated out of approximately seventy U.S. military bases in the United States, Europe, the Pacific, Asia, and the Far East.

== Divestiture by USC ==
With the end of a University-wide strategic study, the students of the institute were given a two-year notice of program closure. In the late 1980s most of the programs operated on the worldwide campus outside of the main USC campus were transferred to University of Denver. There have been reports from alumni and former faculty that the University of Denver maintained the degree program for less than two years, returning ownership to USC. In 1990 Capitol College began offering a similar master's degree in system management. The aviation safety program continues at the Viterbi School of Engineering.

Some professors within the Institute transferred to the Viterbi School of Engineering, where they continue to successfully teach and do research today. Some left the Institute for other locations and endeavors.

== Alumni ==
The student alumni group was named "Triumvirate," and maintained a strong college presence. They had an annual event during USC's Homecoming week.

The systems focus of all the programs provided a unique educational environment that is replicated in few other institutions. This systems focus allowed students to develop and apply systems thinking and approaches to a wide variety of fields, making it a skill common to each of the departmental study areas. The alumni of this program became part of the Viterbi School of Engineering alumni group. Many alumni of I.S.S.M. remain active in their fields, and have achieved prominence in the U.S. military, NASA, and other organizations. For instance, former astronaut Major General Charles F. Bolden, Jr., USMC (Ret), appointed by President Barack Obama as NASA Administrator in July 2009, received the MSSM from USC in 1977.

The Institute of Systems and Safety Management was an example of an organization that was outstanding at what it did, that provided a unique and world-class product, but whose focus did not fit the strategic plan of its supporting organization in a new era, and was thus eliminated.
