= List of carrier-based aircraft =

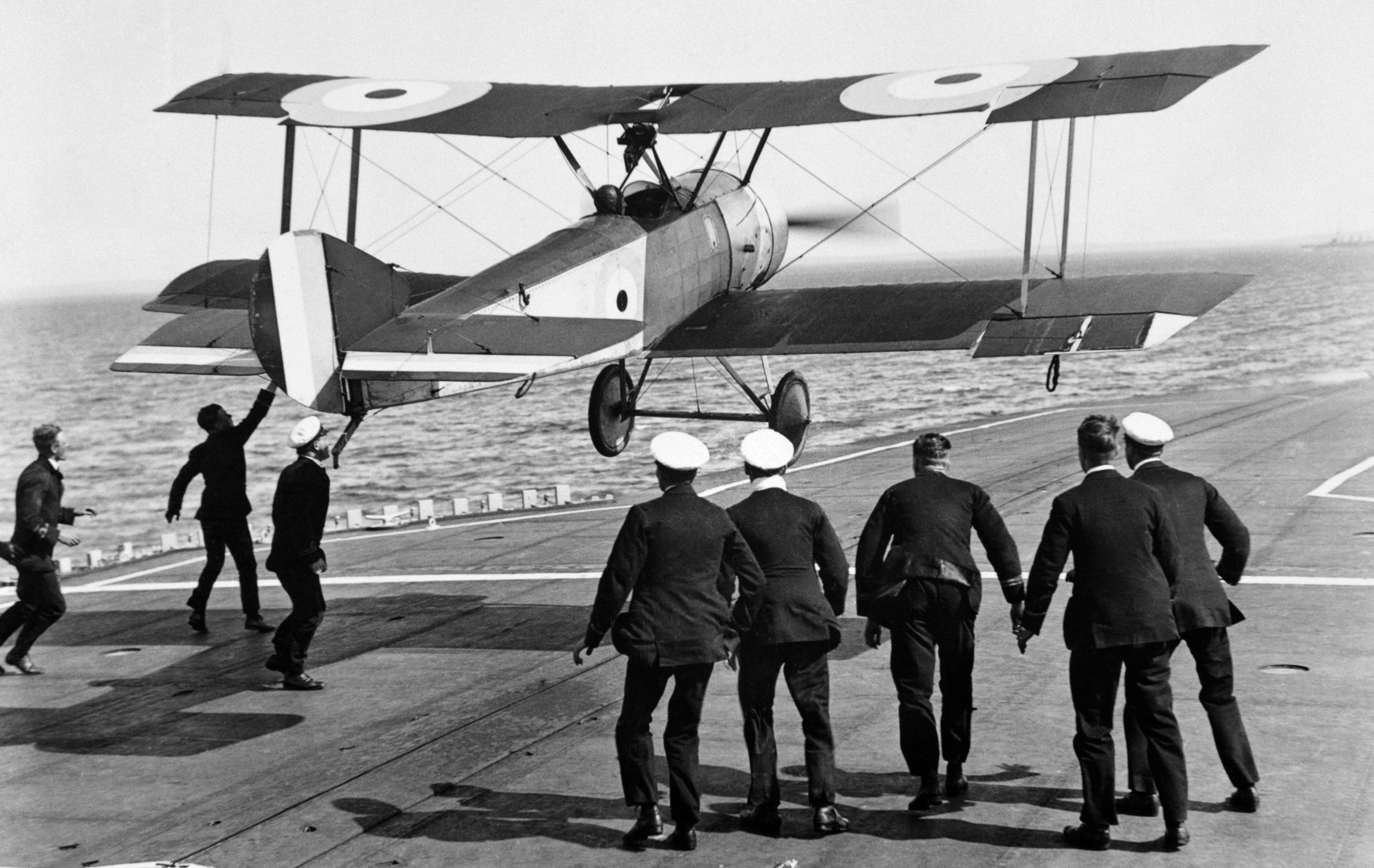
Sqn. Cdr. E. H. Dunning makes the first landing of an aircraft on a moving ship, a Sopwith Pup on HMS Furious, August 2, 1917.

This List of carrier-based aircraft covers fixed-wing aircraft designed for aircraft carrier flight deck operation and excludes aircraft intended for use from seaplane tenders, submarines and dirigibles. Helicopters includes only those regularly operated from aircraft carriers and not those normally flown from other types of surface ships or land bases.

== List of aircraft operated from aircraft carriers ==
Type	Country	Class	Role	Date	Status	No.	Notes
Aeromarine 39	US	Propeller	Trials	1922	Temporary	1+	
Aérospatiale Alouette III	France	Helicopter		1959	Production		
Aérospatiale SA 330 Puma	France	Helicopter		1965	Production	697	
Aérospatiale Super Frelon	France	Helicopter		1962	Production	99	
Agusta-Bell AB.212ASW	Italy	Helicopter	ASW	1969	Production		
AgustaWestland AW101/EH101/Merlin	Italy/UK	Helicopter		1987	Production		
AgustaWestland AW159 Wildcat	UK/Italy	Helicopter	Multirole	2009	Prototype	3	Flight trials with HMS Queen Elizabeth
Aichi B7A Ryūsei	Japan	Propeller	Bomber	1942	Production	114	
Aichi D1A	Japan	Propeller	Dive bomber	1934	Production	590	
Aichi D3A	Japan	Propeller	Dive bomber	1938	Production	1,495	
Aichi E13A	Japan	Propeller	Reconnaissance	1939	Production	1,418	
Aichi E16A Zuiun	Japan	Propeller	Reconnaissance	1942	Production	256	
Aichi M6A Seiran	Japan	Propeller	Dive bomber	1943	Production	26	
Airspeed Fleet Shadower	UK	Propeller	Reconnaissance	1940	Prototype	1	
Arado Ar 195	Germany	Propeller	Torpedo bomber	1937	Prototype	3	
Arado Ar 197	Germany	Propeller	Fighter	1937	Prototype	3	
Armstrong Whitworth A.W.16	UK	Propeller	Fighter	1930	Prototype	18	(Note: 1 evaluated as carrier based fighter)
Armstrong Whitworth Starling	UK	Propeller	Fighter	1929	Prototype	1	
Arsenal VG 90	France	Jet engine	Fighter	1949	Prototype	2	
Avro Avocet	UK	Propeller	Fighter	1927	Prototype	2	
Avro Bison	UK	Propeller	Reconnaissance	1921	Production	55	
Avro Buffalo	UK	Propeller	Torpedo bomber	1926	Prototype	1	
Beardmore W.B.III	UK	Propeller	Fighter	1917	Production	100	
Beardmore W.B.IV	UK	Propeller	Fighter	1917	Prototype	1	
Beardmore W.B.V	UK	Propeller	Fighter	1917	Prototype	2	
Beardmore W.B.VI	UK	Propeller	Fighter	n/a	Prototype	0	not flown
Beardmore W.B.VI	UK	Propeller	Torpedo bomber	n/a	Project	0	
Bell Airacobra I	US	Propeller	Fighter	1945	Temporary	1	First tri-gear landing, on HMS Pretoria Castle
Bell AH-1 SuperCobra	US	Helicopter		1969	Production	1,271+	
Bell Boeing V-22 Osprey	US	Rotorcraft		1989	Production	160	
Bell XFL Airabonita	US	Propeller	Fighter	1940	Prototype	1	
Berliner-Joyce F2J	US	Propeller	Fighter	1933	Prototype	1	
Berliner-Joyce OJ	US	Propeller	Reconnaissance	1931	Production	39	
Berliner-Joyce XF3J	US	Propeller	Fighter	1934	Prototype	1	
Berliner-Joyce XFJ	US	Propeller	Fighter	1931	Prototype	1	
Blackburn Airedale	UK	Propeller	Reconnaissance	1924	Prototype	2	
Blackburn B-3	UK	Propeller	Torpedo bomber	1932	Prototype	2	
Blackburn B-54	UK	Propeller	ASW	1949	Prototype	3	
Blackburn Baffin	UK	Propeller	Torpedo bomber	1932	Production	92	
Blackburn Blackburd	UK	Propeller	Torpedo bomber	1918	Prototype	3	
Blackburn Blackburn	UK	Propeller	Reconnaissance	1922	Production	62	
Blackburn Buccaneer	UK	Jet	Bomber	1958	Production	144	
Blackburn Dart	UK	Propeller	Torpedo bomber	1921	Production	127	
Blackburn Firebrand	UK	Propeller	Fighter/torpedo bomber	1942	Production	225	
Blackburn Firecrest	UK	Propeller	Fighter	1947	Prototype	3~	
Blackburn Nautilus	UK	Propeller	Fighter	1929	Prototype	1	
Blackburn Ripon	UK	Propeller	Torpedo bomber	1926	Production	96	
Blackburn Roc	UK	Propeller	Fighter	1938	Production	136	
Blackburn Shark	UK	Propeller	Torpedo bomber	1933	Production	238	
Blackburn Skua	UK	Propeller	Fighter/dive bomber	1937	Production	190	
Blackburn Sprat	UK	Propeller	Trainer	1926	Prototype	1	
Blackburn Swift	UK	Propeller	Torpedo bomber	1920	Production	8	
Boeing CH-47 Chinook	US	Helicopter	Transport	1961	Production	1,179+	
Boeing EA-18G Growler	US	Jet	Electronic Warfare	2006	Production	85~	
Boeing F/A-18E/F Super Hornet	US	Jet	Fighter	1995	Production	500~	
Boeing F2B	US	Propeller	Fighter	1926	Production	33	
Boeing F3B	US	Propeller	Fighter-bomber	1927	Production	74	
Boeing F4B	US	Propeller	Fighter	1928	Production	189	
Boeing FB	US	Propeller	Fighter	1923	Production	29	
Boeing Vertol CH-46 Sea Knight	US	Helicopter	Transport	1962	Production	524	
Boeing XF5B	US	Propeller	Fighter	1930	Prototype	1	
Boeing XF6B	US	Propeller	Fighter-bomber	1933	Prototype	1	
Boeing XF7B	US	Propeller	Fighter	1933	Prototype	1	
Boeing XF8B	US	Propeller	Fighter	1944	Prototype	3	
Boulton Paul Sea Balliol	UK	Propeller	Trainer	1952	Production	30	
Breguet Alizé	France	Propeller	ASW	1956	Production	89	
Breguet Vultur	France	Propeller	Bomber	1951	Prototype	2	
Brewster Buffalo	US	Propeller	Fighter	1937	Production	503	
Brewster SB2A Buccaneer	US	Propeller	Dive bomber	1941	Production	771	
Bristol Scout	UK	Propeller	Trials	1916	Temporary	1	First flight from moving ship, HMS Vindex
British Aerospace P.125	UK	Jet	Fighter-bomber	n/a	Project	0	
British Aerospace Sea Harrier	UK	Jet	Fighter	1978	Production	115	
Britten-Norman Islander	UK	Propeller	Transport	1968	Temporary	1	Sales demo flights aboard HMS Hermes
Caudron Luciole	France	Propeller	Transport	1940	Temporary	2	Free French recruiters flew from HMS Ark Royal
Cessna O-1E Bird Dog	US	Propeller	Transport	1962-1975	Temporary	1	VNAF landing on USS Midway during Fall of Saigon. USMC O-1s flown from USS Princeton (LPH-5)
Chengdu J-20 B/C	PRC	Jet	Fighter	2016	Prototype	10	
Common Support Aircraft	US	Jet	Multirole	n/a	Project	0	
Consolidated N2Y	US	Propeller	Trainer	1929	Production	7	(Note: Two operated from USS Saratoga (CV-3) and USS Ranger (CV-4).)
Consolidated TBY Sea Wolf	US	Propeller	Torpedo bomber	1941	Production	180	
Consolidated XB2Y	US	Propeller	Dive bomber	1933	Prototype	1	
Consolidated XBY	US	Propeller	Dive bomber	1932	Prototype	1	
Curtiss BF2C Goshawk	US	Propeller	Fighter-bomber	1933	Production	166	
Curtiss F11C Goshawk	US	Propeller	Fighter-bomber	1932	Production	30	
Curtiss F6C Hawk	US	Propeller	Fighter	1925	Production	75	
Curtiss F7C Seahawk	US	Propeller	Fighter	1927	Production	17	
Curtiss F8C/O2C Falcon/Helldiver	US	Propeller	Fighter/dive bomber	1924	Production	150	
Curtiss Model D	US	Propeller	Trials	1910	Temporary	1	First takeoff from ship, from USS Birmingham. First landing on ship, on USS Pennsylvania
Curtiss P-36 Hawk	US	Propeller	Fighter	1941	Temporary	31	Flown from USS Enterprise during delivery
Curtiss P-40F Warhawk	US	Propeller	Fighter	1942	Temporary	109	Torch landings flown from USS Chenango & HMS Archer
Curtiss SB2C Helldiver	US	Propeller	Dive bomber	1940	Production	7,200	
Curtiss SBC Helldiver	US	Propeller	Dive bomber	1935	Production	257	
Curtiss SO3C Seamew	US	Propeller	Reconnaissance	1939	Production	259	
Curtiss SOC Seagull	US	Propeller	Reconnaissance	1934	Production	322	
Curtiss XBT2C	US	Propeller	Torpedo bomber	1945	Prototype	9	
Curtiss XBTC	US	Propeller	Torpedo bomber	1945	Prototype	2	
Curtiss XF14C	US	Propeller	Fighter	1944	Prototype	1	
Curtiss XF15C	US	Propeller	Fighter	1945	Prototype	3	
Curtiss XSB3C	US	Propeller	Dive bomber	n/a	Project	0	
Dassault Étendard IV	France	Jet	Fighter	1958	Production	90	
Dassault Rafale M	France	Jet	Fighter	1986	Production	115	
Dassault-Breguet Super Étendard	France	Jet	Fighter-bomber	1974	Production	85	
de Havilland Canada DHC-3 Otter	Canada	Propeller	Transport	1957	Temporary	4	Suez Crisis, UNEF flights off HMCS Magnificent
de Havilland Canada DHC-5 Buffalo	Canada	Propeller	Transport	1980	Temporary	1	QSRA trials from USS Kitty Hawk
de Havilland Canada L-20 Beaver	Canada	Propeller	Transport	1958	Temporary	2	Lebanon crisis, flown from USS Corregidor
de Havilland Sea Hornet	UK	Propeller	Fighter	1944	Production	174	
de Havilland Sea Mosquito	UK	Propeller	Torpedo bomber/trainer	1944	Production	66	
de Havilland Sea Vampire	UK	Jet	Fighter	1944	Production	98	
de Havilland Sea Venom	UK	Jet	Fighter	1951	Production	298	
de Havilland Sea Vixen	UK	Jet	Fighter	1951	Production	145	
Dewoitine D.1ter	France	Propeller	Fighter	1922	Production	30	
Dewoitine D.373 & 376	France	Propeller	Fighter	1931	Production	45	
Douglas A-3 Skywarrior	US	Jet	Bomber	1952	Production	282	
Douglas A-4 Skyhawk	US	Jet	Bomber	1954	Production	2,960	
Douglas A2D Skyshark	US	Propeller	Bomber	1950	Prototype	12	
Douglas AD Skyraider	US	Propeller	Bomber	1945	Production	3,180	
Douglas BTD Destroyer	US	Propeller	Torpedo bomber	1943	Production	30	
Douglas DT	US	Propeller	Torpedo bomber	1921	Production	90	
Douglas F3D Skynight	US	Jet	Fighter	1948	Production	268	
Douglas F4D Skyray	US	Jet	Fighter	1951	Production	422	
Douglas F5D Skylancer	US	Jet	Fighter	1956	Prototype	4	
Douglas F6D Missileer	US	Jet	Fighter	n/a	Project	0	
Douglas R4D-5	US	Propeller	Transport	1947	Temporary	6	Highjump flights from USS Philippine Sea
Douglas SBD Dauntless	US	Propeller	Dive bomber	1938	Production	5,356	
Douglas T2D	US	Propeller	Torpedo bomber	1927	Production	31	
Douglas TBD Devastator	US	Propeller	Torpedo bomber	1935	Production	130	
Douglas XT3D	US	Propeller	Torpedo bomber	1931	Prototype	1	
Douglas XTB2D Skypirate	US	Propeller	Torpedo bomber	1945	Prototype	2	
Eberhart F2G	US	Propeller	Fighter	1928	Prototype	1	
Eberhart FG	US	Propeller	Fighter	1927	Prototype	1	
Eurocopter AS332 Super Puma	France	Helicopter		1978	Production		
Eurocopter AS365 Dauphin	France	Helicopter		1975	Production		
Eurocopter Fennec	France	Helicopter	ASW/Transport	1990	Production		rebranded Ecreuil
Fairey Albacore	UK	Propeller	Torpedo/dive bomber	1938	Production	800	
Fairey Barracuda	UK	Propeller	Torpedo/dive bomber	1940	Production	2,582	
Fairey Firefly III/IIIM	UK	Propeller	Fighter	1929	Prototype	1	
Fairey Firefly	UK	Propeller	Fighter-bomber	1941	Production	1,702	
Fairey Fleetwing	UK	Propeller	Fighter	1929	Prototype	1	
Fairey Flycatcher	UK	Propeller	Fighter	1922	Production	196	
Fairey Fox Mk.IA	UK	Propeller	Trials	1926	Temporary	1	HMS Furious
Fairey Fulmar	UK	Propeller	Fighter	1937	Production	600	
Fairey Gannet	UK	Propeller	ASW/AEW	1949	Production	348	
Fairey III	UK	Propeller	Reconnaissance	1917	Production	964	
Fairey Seal	UK	Propeller	Reconnaissance	1930	Production	91	
Fairey Spearfish	UK	Propeller	Torpedo/dive bomber	1945	Prototype	5	
Fairey Swordfish	UK	Propeller	Torpedo bomber	1934	Production	2,391	
Fiat G.50 bis/A Freccia	Italy	Propeller	Fighter	1942	Prototype	1	
Fieseler Fi 167	Germany	Propeller	Dive bomber	1938	Production	14	
Fouga CM.175 Zéphyr M	France	Jet	Trainer	1956	Production	32	
Gasuden KR-2	Japan	Propeller	Transport	1934	Production	6	
General Aircraft Fleet Shadower	UK	Propeller	Reconnaissance	1940	Prototype	1	
General Dynamics-Grumman F-111B	US	Jet	Fighter	1965	Prototype	7	
Gloster Gambet	UK	Propeller	Fighter	1927	Prototype	1	
Gloster Gladiator II	UK	Propeller	Fighter	1940	Temporary	18	Norwegian Campaign, flown from HMS Glorious
Gloster Gnatsnapper	UK	Propeller	Fighter	1927	Prototype	2	(or 3)
Gloster Meteor F.3 (Derwent 5)	UK	Jet	Trials	1948–1949	Temporary	2	HMS Implacable and HMS Illustrious (Note: The first Meteor F.1 prototype was used for deck handling trials aboard HMS Pretoria Castle in 1946 however no flights were attempted at that time.)
Gloster Nightjar	UK	Propeller	Fighter	1921	Production	22	
Gloster Sea Gladiator	UK	Propeller	Fighter	1937	Production	98	
Gloster Sparrowhawk III	UK	Propeller	Fighter	1921	Production	10	
Gloster TSR.38	UK	Propeller	Torpedo bomber	1932	Prototype	1	
Goodyear F2G Corsair	US	Propeller	Fighter	1945	Prototype	10	
Gourdou-Leseurre GL.22	France	Propeller	Trainer	1918	Production	20	(Note: 1 used for carrier evaluation from Béarn with suitable modifications)
Great Lakes BG	US	Propeller	Bomber	1933	Production	61	
Great Lakes XTBG	US	Propeller	Torpedo bomber	1935	Prototype	1	
Grumman A-6 Intruder	US	Jet	Bomber	1960	Production	693	
Grumman AF Guardian	US	Propeller	ASW	1945	Production	389	
Grumman C-1 Trader	US	Propeller	Transport	1955	Production	83	
Grumman C-2 Greyhound	US	Propeller	Transport	1964	Production	58	
Grumman E-1 Tracer	US	Propeller	AEW	1956	Production	88	
Grumman E-2 Hawkeye	US	Propeller	AEW	1960	Production	313	
Grumman EA-6B Prowler	US	Jet	Electronic Warfare	1968	Production	170	
Grumman F-9 Cougar	US	Jet	Fighter	1951	Production	1,392	
Grumman F-11 Tiger	US	Jet	Fighter	1954	Production	200	
Grumman F-14 Tomcat	US	Jet	Fighter	1970	Production	632	
Grumman FF	US	Propeller	Fighter	1931	Production	85	
Grumman F2F	US	Propeller	Fighter	1933	Production	56	
Grumman F3F	US	Propeller	Fighter	1935	Production	147	
Grumman F4F Wildcat	US	Propeller	Fighter	1937	Production	7,885	
Grumman F6F Hellcat	US	Propeller	Fighter	1942	Production	12,275	
Grumman F7F Tigercat	US	Propeller	Fighter	1943	Production	364	
Grumman F8F Bearcat	US	Propeller	Fighter	1944	Production	1,265	
Grumman F9F Panther	US	Jet	Fighter	1947	Production	1,382	
Grumman G-118	US	Jet	Fighter	n/a	Project	0	
Grumman J2F Duck	US	Propeller	Transport/SAR	1936	Production	584	
Grumman S-2 Tracker	US	Propeller	ASW	1952	Production	1,284	
Grumman SF	US	Propeller	Fighter	1931	Production	35	
Grumman TBF Avenger	US	Propeller	Torpedo bomber	1941	Production	9,839	
Grumman XF10F Jaguar	US	Jet	Fighter	1952	Prototype	1	
Grumman XF5F Skyrocket	US	Propeller	Fighter	1940	Prototype	1	
Grumman XSBF	US	Propeller	Bomber	1936	Prototype	1	
Grumman XTB2F	US	Propeller	Torpedo bomber	n/a	Project	0	
Grumman XTSF	US	Propeller	Torpedo bomber	n/a	Project	0	
HAL Naval Tejas	India	Jet	Fighter	2012	Prototype	2	
Hall XFH-1	US	Propeller	Fighter	1929	Prototype	1	
Handley Page H.P.46	UK	Propeller	Torpedo bomber	1932	Prototype	1	
Handley Page Hanley	UK	Propeller	Torpedo bomber	1922	Prototype	3	
Handley Page Hendon	UK	Propeller	Torpedo bomber	1924	Prototype	6	
Handley Page HP.14	UK	Propeller	Reconnaissance	1917	Prototype	3	
Handley Page HPS-1	UK	Propeller	Fighter	1923	Prototype	2	
Hanriot HD.1	France	Propeller	Trials	1920	Temporary	1+	
Hanriot HD.2	France	Propeller	Trials	1920	Temporary	2	
Hanriot HD.3	France	Propeller	Trials	1920	Temporary	1	
Hanriot HD.20	France	Propeller	Fighter	1923	Prototype	1	
Hawker Hedgehog	UK	Propeller	Fighter	1924	Prototype	1	
Hawker Hoopoe	UK	Propeller	Fighter	1928	Prototype	1	
Hawker Hurricane I	UK	Propeller	Fighter	1940	Temporary	18	Norwegian Campaign, flown from HMS Glorious
Hawker Nimrod	UK	Propeller	Fighter	1930	Production	92	
Hawker Osprey/Naval Hart	UK	Propeller	Fighter/reconnaissance	1932	Production	112	
Hawker Sea Fury	UK	Propeller	Fighter	1945	Production	864	
Hawker Sea Hawk	UK	Jet	Fighter	1947	Production	542	
Hawker Sea Hurricane	UK	Propeller	Fighter	1940	Production	1,190+	
Hawker Siddeley P.1017	UK	Jet	Fighter	n/a	Project	0	
Hawker Siddeley P.1154	UK	Jet	Fighter	n/a	Project	0	
Hawker Siddeley P.139B	UK	Jet	AEW	n/a	Project	0	
Heinkel HD 23	Germany	Propeller	Fighter	1926	Prototype	4	
Junkers Ju 87C	Germany	Propeller	Dive bomber	1938	Prototype	10	
Kaiser-Fleetwings XBTK	US	Propeller	Torpedo bomber	1945	Prototype	5	
Kaman SH-2 Seasprite	US	Helicopter	ASW	1959	Production	184	
Kaman SH-2G Super Seasprite	US	Helicopter	ASW	1985	Production	59	
Kamov Ka-20	USSR	Helicopter	ASW/Transport	1960	Prototype		
Kamov Ka-25	USSR	Helicopter	ASW/EW/AEW	1963	Production	460~	
Kamov Ka-27, Ka-28 & Ka-32	USSR	Helicopter	ASW/AEW/Transport	1973	Production		
Kawanishi E15K Shiun	Japan	Propeller	Reconnaissance	1941	Production	15	
Kawanishi K-11	Japan	Propeller	Fighter	1927	Prototype	2	
Kawanishi N1K Kyōfū	Japan	Propeller	Fighter	1942	Production		
Kawanishi N1K3-A Shiden Kai 2	Japan	Propeller	Fighter	1942	Prototype	2	
Kayaba Ka-1	Japan	Autogyro	ASW/Reconnaissance	1941	Production	98	
Kokusai Ki-76	Japan	Propeller	ASW/Reconnaissance	1941	Production	937	
Latécoère 298	France	Propeller	Torpedo/dive bomber	1939	Prototype	2	
Les Mureaux 1 C.1 Express-Marin	France	Propeller	Fighter	1924	Prototype	1	
Levasseur PL.10, 101 & 107	France	Propeller	Reconnaissance	1929	Production	63	
Levasseur PL.14	France	Propeller	Torpedo bomber	1929	Production	30	
Levasseur PL.2	France	Propeller	Torpedo bomber	1922	Production	11	
Levasseur PL.4	France	Propeller	Reconnaissance	1926	Production	40	
Levasseur PL.5	France	Propeller	Fighter	1925	Production	24	& 9
Levasseur PL.7	France	Propeller	Torpedo bomber	1928	Production	46	
Lévy-Biche LB.2	France	Propeller	Fighter	1927	Production	26	
Lockheed XJO-3 Electra Junior	US	Propeller	Trials	1939	Temporary	1	Nosewheel trials flown from USS Lexington
Lockheed KC-130F Hercules	US	Propeller	Trials	1963	Temporary	1	USMC trials from USS Forrestal
Lockheed Martin F-35B & C Lightning II	US	Jet	Fighter	2006	Production		
Lockheed P-80A Shooting Star	US	Jet	Trials	1946	Temporary	1	USAAF jet flown from USS Franklin D. Roosevelt
Lockheed P2V-3C Neptune	US	Propeller	Trials	1948–1951	Temporary	13	Nuclear bomber from USS Franklin D. Roosevelt
Lockheed S-3 Viking	US	Jet	ASW	1972	Production	188	
Lockheed T2V SeaStar	US	Jet	Trainer	1953	Production	150	
Lockheed U-2C	US	Jet	Reconnaissance	1963	Temporary	1	Monitoring French nuclear tests from USS Ranger
Lockheed U-2G	US	Jet	Reconnaissance	1955	Prototype	3	(Note: Modified U-2A for shipboard use with strengthened undercarriage.)
Lockheed U-2R	US	Jet	Trials	1969	Temporary	1	USS America
Loening OL-8A	US	Propeller	Reconnaissance	1923	Production	20	
Loening XFL	US	Propeller	Fighter	n/a	Project	0	
Loire 130	France	Propeller	Reconnaissance	1937	Production	125	
Loire 210	France	Propeller	Fighter	1935	Production	21	
Loire-Gourdou-Leseurre LGL.32	France	Propeller	Fighter	1925	Production	15	
Loire-Nieuport LN.401	France	Propeller	Dive bomber	1938	Production	68	
Mann Egerton Type H	UK	Propeller	Fighter	1917	Prototype	2	
Martin AM Mauler	US	Propeller	Bomber	1944	Production	151	
Martin BM	US	Propeller	Bomber	1930	Production	32	
Martin T3M	US	Propeller	Torpedo bomber	1926	Production	124	
Martin T4M & Great Lakes TG	US	Propeller	Torpedo bomber	1927	Production	155	
Martin XT6M	US	Propeller	Torpedo bomber	1930	Prototype	1	
McDonnell Douglas A-12 Avenger II	US	Jet	Bomber	n/a	Project	0	
McDonnell Douglas F-4 Phantom II	US	Jet	Fighter	1958	Production	5,195	
McDonnell Douglas T-45 Goshawk	US	Jet	Trainer	1988	Production	214	
McDonnell FH Phantom	US	Jet	Fighter	1945	Production	62	
McDonnell F2H Banshee	US	Jet	Fighter	1947	Production	895	
McDonnell F3H Demon	US	Jet	Fighter	1951	Production	519	
McDonnell-Douglas AV-8B Harrier II	US	Jet	Bomber	1978–1985	Production	323	
McDonnell-Douglas F/A-18 Hornet	US	Jet	Fighter-bomber	1978	Production	1,479	
Messerschmitt Bf 109T-1	Germany	Propeller	Fighter	1939	Prototype	7	
Mikoyan MiG-29K	USSR	Jet	Fighter	1988	Production	20	
Mitsubishi 1MF	Japan	Propeller	Fighter	1921	Production	138	
Mitsubishi 1MF9	Japan	Propeller	Fighter	1927	Production	2	
Mitsubishi 1MT	Japan	Propeller	Torpedo bomber	1922	Production	20	
Mitsubishi 2MR	Japan	Propeller	Reconnaissance	1922	Production	159	
Mitsubishi 3MT5	Japan	Propeller	Torpedo bomber	1932	Production	11	
Mitsubishi A5M	Japan	Propeller	Fighter	1935	Production	1,094	
Mitsubishi A6M Zero	Japan	Propeller	Fighter	1939	Production	10,449	
Mitsubishi A7M Reppū	Japan	Propeller	Fighter	1944	Prototype	10	
Mitsubishi B1M	Japan	Propeller	Bomber	1923	Production	443	
Mitsubishi B2M	Japan	Propeller	Bomber	1929	Production	206	
Mitsubishi B5M	Japan	Propeller	Bomber	1937	Production	125	
Mitsubishi F1M	Japan	Propeller	Reconnaissance	1936	Production	944	
Morane-Saulnier MS.226	France	Propeller	Fighter	1933	Production	3	
Morane-Saulnier MS.474 Vanneau IV	France	Propeller	Trainer	1944	Production	70	
Morane-Saulnier MS.500 Criquet	France	Propeller	Transport	1945–1949	Temporary		Operated from Arromanches during the First Indochina War
Nakajima A1N	Japan	Propeller	Fighter	1927	Production	151	
Nakajima A2N	Japan	Propeller	Fighter	1929	Production	100 ca.	
Nakajima A4N	Japan	Propeller	Fighter	1934	Production	221	
Nakajima B3N	Japan	Propeller	Bomber	1933	Prototype	2	
Nakajima B4N	Japan	Propeller	Bomber	1936	Prototype	2	
Nakajima B5N	Japan	Propeller	Bomber	1937	Production	1,149	
Nakajima B6N Tenzan	Japan	Propeller	Bomber	1941	Production	1,268	
Nakajima C3N	Japan	Propeller	Reconnaissance	1936	Production	2	
Nakajima C6N Saiun	Japan	Propeller	Reconnaissance	1943	Production	463	
Naval Aircraft Factory SBN	US	Propeller	Bomber	1936	Prototype	31	
Naval Aircraft Factory TS	US	Propeller	Fighter	1922	Production	46	
NHIndustries NH90	NATO	Helicopter		1995	Production	161	
Nieuport 21	France	Propeller	Trials	1919–1920	Temporary	1	
Nieuport-Delage NiD 32	France	Propeller	Fighter	1920	Production	10	
Nieuport-Delage NiD 43	France	Propeller	Fighter	1924	Prototype	1	
Nord 1500 Noréclair	France	Propeller	ASW/bomber	1947	Prototype	1	
Nord 2200	France	Jet	Fighter	1949	Prototype	1	
North American A-5 Vigilante	US	Jet	Reconnaissance	1958	Production	156	
North American AJ Savage	US	Propeller	Bomber	1948	Production	143	
North American B-25B Mitchell	US	Propeller	Bomber	1942	Temporary	16	Doolittle Raid launched from USS Hornet
North American ETF-51D Mustang	US	Propeller	Fighter	1944	Prototype	1	
North American FJ-1 Fury	US	Jet	Fighter	1946	Production	31	
North American FJ-2/-3 Fury	US	Jet	Fighter	1951	Production	741	
North American FJ-4 Fury	US	Jet	Fighter	1954	Production	374	
North American L-17 (Navion)	US	Propeller	Transport	1950	Temporary		Korean War Courier/VIP transport
North American PBJ-1H	US	Propeller	Bomber	1944	Production	1	(Note: 1 modified for carrier use)
North American Rockwell OV-10 Bronco	US	Propeller	Trials	1968, 1985	Temporary		USS John F. Kennedy and USS Saratoga
North American T-2 Buckeye	US	Jet	Trainer	1958	Production	529	
North American T-28 Trojan	US	Propeller	Trainer	1949	Production	266	
North American SNJ-3C/-4C/-5C	US	Propeller	Trainer	1935	Production	52+	
North American XA2J Super Savage	US	Propeller	Bomber	1952	Prototype	1	
Northrop BT	US	Propeller	Bomber	1935	Production	55	
Northrop NATF-23	US	Jet	Fighter	n/a	Project	0	
Parnall Panther	UK	Propeller	Reconnaissance	1917	Production	155	
Parnall Perch	UK	Propeller	Trainer	1926	Prototype	1	
Parnall Pike	UK	Propeller	Reconnaissance	1927	Prototype	1	
Parnall Pipit	UK	Propeller	Fighter	1928	Prototype	2	
Parnall Plover	UK	Propeller	Fighter	1922	Production	13	
Parnall Puffin	UK	Propeller	Fighter/reconnaissance	1920	Prototype	3	
Percival Vega Gull	UK	Propeller	Transport	1936/1937	Temporary	1	Flown on (by Edgar Percival) and later off and on from HMS Courageous
Piasecki H-21	US	Helicopter		1952	Production	18+	
Piasecki HRP Rescuer	US	Helicopter	Transport/SAR	1945	Production	28	
Piasecki HUP Retriever	US	Helicopter	Transport/SAR	1948	Production	339	
Piper L-4 Grasshopper	US	Propeller	Reconnaissance	1944	Temporary	27+	From LST for WW2 landings
Potez 452	France	Propeller	Reconnaissance	1936	Production	16	
Reggiane Re.2001 OR	Italy	Propeller	Fighter	1940	Production	10	
Republic P-47 Thunderbolt	US	Propeller	Fighter	1944	Temporary	4	P-47s being ferried by USS Manila Bay flown off to defend ship off Saipan
Rockwell XFV-12	US	Jet	Fighter	n/a	Prototype	1	Failed to achieve flight
Ryan FR Fireball	US	Propeller/Jet	Fighter	1944	Production	71	
Saro P.531	UK	Helicopter		1958	Prototype	6	Produced as Westland Wasp
SEPECAT Jaguar M	France	Jet	Bomber	1969	Prototype	1	
Seversky XFN-1	US	Propeller	Fighter	1937	Prototype	1	
Shenyang J-15	PRC	Jet	Fighter	2013	Production	50	
Shenyang J-35	PRC	Jet	Fighter	2021	Prototype	1	
Short Gurnard	UK	Propeller	Fighter	1929	Prototype	2	
Short Seamew	UK	Propeller	ASW	1953	Prototype	26	
Short Shirl	UK	Propeller	Torpedo bomber	1918	Prototype	4	
Sikorsky CH-53 Sea Stallion	US	Helicopter	Transport/SAR	1964	Production	265+	
Sikorsky HNS (R-4)	US	Helicopter	Transport	1942	Production	131	
Sikorsky HO2S (R-5/H-5)	US	Helicopter	Transport	1943	Production	300+	
Sikorsky HO4S (S-55)	US	Helicopter	Transport/SAR	1949	Production	94	
Sikorsky Hoverfly II (R-6)	US	Helicopter	Transport/trainer	1943	Production	225	
Sikorsky HR2S/CH-37	US	Helicopter	Transport	1953	Production	62	
Sikorsky HSS Seabat (S-58)	US	Helicopter	ASW/Transport	1954	Production	218	
Sikorsky SH-3 Sea King	US	Helicopter	ASW/SAR/Transport	1959	Production	756 ca.	
Sikorsky SH-60 Seahawk	US	Helicopter	ASW/SAR/Transport	1979	Production	400+	
Sikorsky XHJS	US	Helicopter	Transport	1947	Prototype	2	
Slingsby T.20	UK	Glider	Trials	1945	Temporary	1	Flight deck turbulence trials from HMS Pretoria Castle & HMS Illustrious
SNCAC NC.1070	France	Jet	Bomber	1947	Prototype	2	
SNCAC NC.1080	France	Jet	Fighter	1949	Prototype	1	
SNCASE (Sud-Est) Aquilon	France	Jet	Fighter	1951	Production	120	
SNCASO SO.8000 Narval	France	Propeller	Fighter	1949	Prototype	2	
Sopwith 2F.1 Ship's Camel	UK	Propeller	Fighter	1917	Production	340	Zeppelin interceptors flown from towed barges.
Sopwith Camel	UK	Propeller	Fighter	1917	Production		Zeppelin interceptors flown from towed barges.
Sopwith Cuckoo	UK	Propeller	Torpedo bomber	1918	Production	232	
Sopwith Pup and Ship's Pup	UK	Propeller	Fighter	1916	Production	1,770	(Note: Production total is for all variants.)
Sopwith Ship's Strutter	UK	Propeller	Fighter	1915	Production	5,939	
Stinson L-5 Sentinel	US	Propeller	Reconnaissance	1943	Temporary		Used Brodie device from USS City of Dalhart and LSTs
Stinson OY Sentinel	US	Propeller	Reconnaissance	1950	Temporary	1+	Korean War
Sukhoi Su-25UTG & UBP	USSR	Jet	Bomber	1988	Production	20~	
Sukhoi Su-33	USSR	Jet	Fighter	1987	Production	24~	
Supermarine Attacker	UK	Jet	Fighter	1946	Production	185	
Supermarine Scimitar	UK	Jet	Fighter	1956	Production	76	
Supermarine Seafang	UK	Propeller	Fighter	1946	Prototype	18	
Supermarine Seafire	UK	Propeller	Fighter	1942	Production	2,556	
Supermarine Type 322	UK	Propeller	Torpedo/dive bomber	1943	Prototype	2	
Supermarine Walrus	UK	Propeller	Reconnaissance	1933	Production	740	
Taylorcraft Auster	UK	Propeller	Trials	1945–1946	Temporary	3+	HMS Argus, Ravager and Illustrious
Vickers Type 141	UK	Propeller	Fighter	1927	Prototype	1	
Vickers Type 177	UK	Propeller	Fighter	1929	Prototype	1	
Vickers Type 207	UK	Propeller	Torpedo bomber	1933	Prototype	1	
Vickers Vanellus	UK	Propeller	Reconnaissance	1925	Prototype	1	
Vickers Viking III & IV	UK	Propeller	Reconnaissance	1919	Production	2	
Vickers Vireo	UK	Propeller	Fighter	1928	Prototype	1	
Villiers II	France	Propeller	Fighter	1925	Production	32	
Vought A-7 Corsair II	US	Jet	Bomber	1965	Production	1,569	
Vought F-8 Crusader	US	Jet	Fighter	1955	Production	1,219	
Vought F4U/FG/F3A Corsair	US	Propeller	Fighter	1940	Production	12,571	
Vought F6U Pirate	US	Jet	Fighter	1946	Production	33	
Vought F7U Cutlass	US	Jet	Fighter	1948	Production	320	
Vought FU	US	Propeller	Fighter	1926	Production	20	
Vought Model 1600	US	Jet	Fighter	n/a	Project	0	
Vought O2U Corsair	US	Propeller	Reconnaissance	1926	Production	322	
Vought O3U/SU Corsair	US	Propeller	Reconnaissance	1930	Production	291	
Vought XO4U Corsair	US	Propeller	Reconnaissance	1931	Prototype	2	
Vought SB2U Vindicator	US	Propeller	Bomber	1936	Production	170	
Vought SBU Corsair	US	Propeller	Bomber	1933	Production	125	
Vought VE-7	US	Propeller	Fighter	1917	Production	128	
Vought XF5U	US	Propeller	Fighter	n/a	Prototype	1	Failed to achieve flight
Vought XF8U-3 Crusader III	US	Jet	Fighter	1958	Prototype	5	
Vought XS2U	US	Propeller	ASW	n/a	Project	0	
Vought XSB3U	US	Propeller	Bomber	1936	Prototype	1	
Watanabe E9W	Japan	Propeller	Reconnaissance	1935	Production	35	
Westland Dragonfly	UK	Helicopter	Transport/SAR	1948	Production	133	
Westland Lynx	UK	Helicopter	ASW/Transport	1971	Production		
Westland PV-3	UK	Propeller	Reconnaissance	1931	Prototype	1	
Westland Sea King	UK	Helicopter	ASW/Transport/SAR	1969	Production	344	
Westland Walrus	UK	Propeller	Reconnaissance	1921	Production	36	
Westland Wasp	UK	Helicopter	ASW	1962	Production	133	
Westland Wessex	UK	Helicopter	Transport/SAR	1958	Production	170	
Westland Whirlwind	UK	Helicopter	Transport/SAR	1953	Production	400	
Westland Wyvern	UK	Propeller	Bomber	1946	Production	127	
Wibault 74	France	Propeller	Fighter	1924	Production	18	
Yakovlev Yak-38	USSR	Jet	Fighter	1971	Production	231	
Yakovlev Yak-41	USSR	Jet	Fighter	1987	Prototype	2	
Yakovlev Yak-43	USSR	Jet	Fighter	n/a	Project	0	
Yakovlev Yak-44	USSR	Propeller	AEW	n/a	Project	0	
Yokosuka B3Y	Japan	Propeller	Bomber	1933	Production	129	
Yokosuka B4Y	Japan	Propeller	Bomber	1935	Production	205	
Yokosuka D3Y	Japan	Propeller	Dive bomber	1944	Prototype	5	
Yokosuka D4Y Suisei	Japan	Propeller	Dive bomber	1940	Production	2,038	
Yokosuka E14Y	Japan	Propeller	Reconnaissance	1939	Production	126	

== See also ==
- Carrier-based aircraft
- Carrier aircraft used during World War II
- Naval aviation
- Escort carrier
- List of submarine-borne aircraft
