= Keystone XOK =

XOK-1

General information
- Type: Observation floatplane
- Manufacturer: Keystone Aircraft
- Primary user: United States Navy
- Number built: 1
- Serial: A8357

History
- First flight: January 1931

The Keystone XOK was an American biplane observation floatplane developed for the United States Navy during the early 1930s.

== Design and development ==
In 1929, the Navy issued requirements calling for an observation floatplane intended for service aboard Omaha class light cruisers, readily convertible to wheels or floats and light enough to operate from the cruiser-type catapult.

Prototypes were ordered from Keystone-Loening (then a subsidiary of Curtiss-Wright), Berliner-Joyce and Vought, and designated as the XOK-1, XOJ-1 and XO4U-1 respectively. The Keystone design was a conventional biplane of mixed metal and fabric construction, with the pilot and observer seated in tandem in open cockpits. It made its first flight on January 5, 1931.

On April 15, 1931, during a demonstration before naval officials, the XOK-1 broke up in flight after the cowling detached itself and smashed into the wings and tailplane. With the Berliner-Joyce and Vought prototypes nearly ready for trials, the Bureau of Aeronautics elected to discontinue further development of the XOK-1. Eventually, the Berliner-Joyce's entry was selected for production.

== Operators ==
United States

- United States Navy

== Specifications (XOK-1) ==
Data from

General characteristics

- Crew: 2 (pilot and observer)
- Length: 29 ft 10 in (9.09 m)
- Wingspan: 34 ft 8 in (10.57 m)
- Wing area: 293 sq ft (27.2 m^{2})
- Empty weight: 2,219 lb (1,007 kg)
- Gross weight: 3,395 lb (1,540 kg)
- Powerplant: 1 × Wright R-975 radial engine, 400 hp (300 kW)

Performance

- Maximum speed: 139 mph (224 km/h, 121 kn) at sea level
- Range: 330 mi (530 km, 290 nmi) estimated
- Service ceiling: 19,900 ft (6,100 m)

Armament

- Guns: 1× fixed, forward firing .30 in machine gun; 1× flexibly mounted .30 in machine gun in the rear cockpit

== See also ==
Aircraft of comparable role, configuration, and era

- Berliner-Joyce OJ
- Curtiss SOC Seagull
- Vought O4U Corsair

Related lists

- List of United States Navy aircraft designations (pre-1962)
- List of flying boats and floatplanes
