= Beardmore W.B.1a =

British World War I bomber biplane

W.B.1a

General information
- Type: Bomber
- National origin: United Kingdom
- Manufacturer: Beardmore
- Designer: G. Tilghman Richards
- Status: Unbuilt design

History
- Developed from: Beardmore W.B.1

The Beardmore W.B.1a was a proposed British two-seater, long-distance bomber biplane of the First World War. The aircraft was intended to be a larger, more powerful development of the unsuccessful Beardmore W.B.1. The pilot and observer would have been seated in the rear of the fuselage, just before the tail section.

== Specifications (proposal) ==
Data from

General characteristics

- Crew: 2
- Capacity: 2
- Length: 32 ft 10 in (10.01 m)
- Wingspan: 70 ft (21 m)
- Height: 15 ft 8 in (4.78 m)
- Wing area: 946 sq ft (87.9 m^{2})
- Empty weight: 4,537 lb (2,058 kg)
- Gross weight: 8,900 lb (4,037 kg)
- Fuel capacity: 214 imp gal (257 US gal; 973 L)
- Powerplant: 1 × Galloway Atlantic , 500 hp (370 kW)
- Propellers: 4-bladed fixed-pitch propeller, 14 ft (4.3 m) diameter
- Propeller speed: 900 rpm

Performance

- Cruise speed: 110 mph (180 km/h, 96 kn)
- Endurance: 6 hours 30 minutes
- Wing loading: 9.4 lb/sq ft (46 kg/m^{2})
- Power/mass: 0.058 hp/lb (0.095 kW/kg)
