= Grumman XF12F =

The Grumman XF12F was the proposed designation of two fighter aircraft designed by Grumman:

- Grumman F11F-1F Super Tiger or G-98J, a 1956 single-seat prototype
- Grumman G-118, an unbuilt two-seat, carrier-based interceptor
