= Vought Corsair =

Vought Corsair is the name of several former aircraft of the US Navy:

- Vought O2U Corsair, a biplane scout and observation aircraft
- Vought O4U Corsair, a biplane scout and observation aircraft prototype
- Vought SBU Corsair, a biplane dive bomber aircraft
- Vought F4U Corsair, a monoplane shipborne fighter/dive bomber aircraft
- LTV A-7 Corsair II, a single-seat light jet attack aircraft
