= Beardmore W.B.II =

Beardmore W.B.2
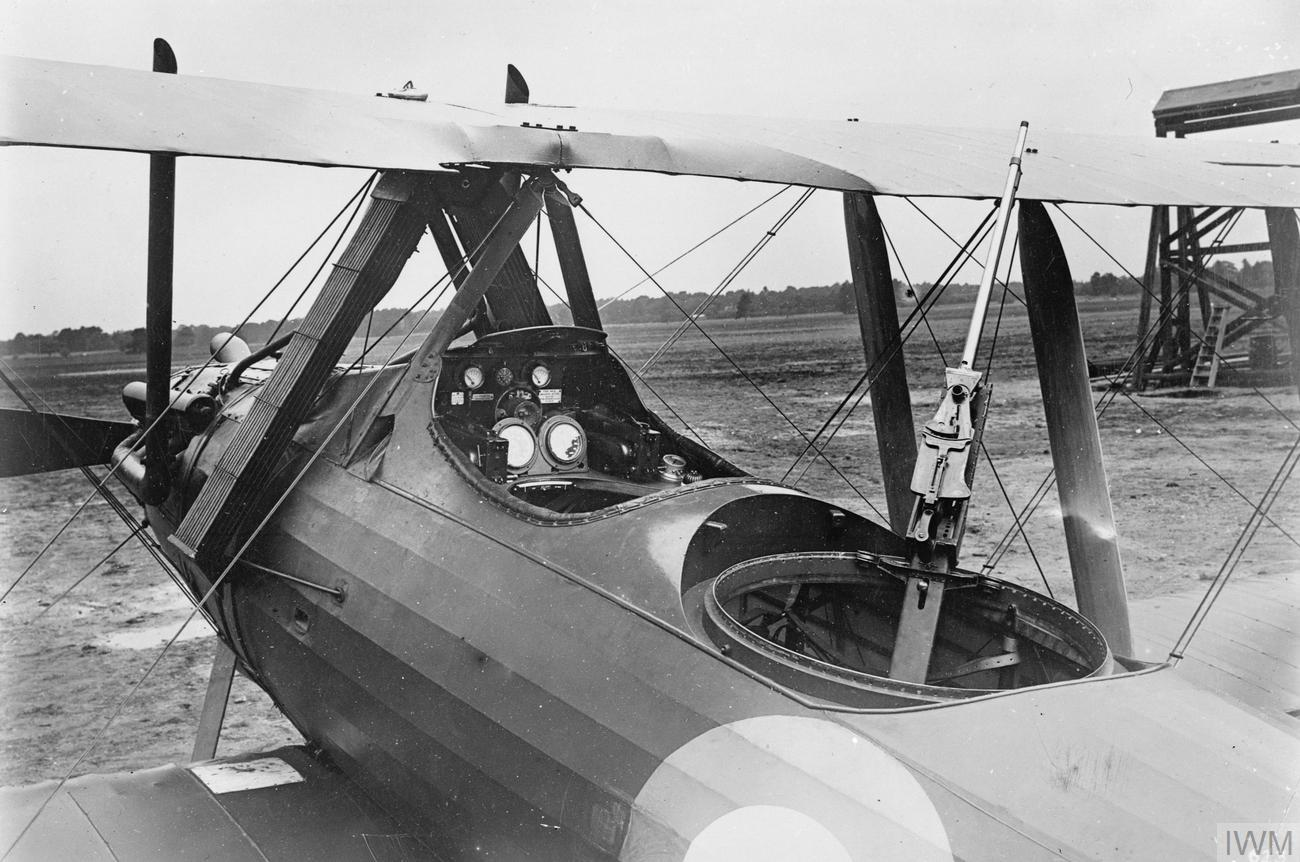
- Cockpit of a Beardmore W.B.2

General information
- Type: Fighter
- National origin: United Kingdom
- Manufacturer: William Beardmore and Company
- Designer: G. Tilghman-Richards
- Number built: 3

History
- First flight: 30 August 1917

The Beardmore W.B.II was a British biplane fighter prototype of the 1910s.

== Development ==
A two-seat fighter of wooden construction, the W.B.II was built as a private venture by William Beardmore and Company. A development of the Royal Aircraft Factory B.E.2c it was designed by G. Tilghman Richards in 1916. Powered by a 200 hp (150 kW) Hispano-Suiza 8Bd engine, it carried two guns and design finished early in 1917 with the production of the first prototype.

== Operational history ==
The W.B.II was first flown on 30 August 1917, and performance proved good. However, the Air Ministry deemed that the 8Bd engine, at that time in short supply, was needed more urgently for use in the S.E.5a fighter at that time serving with the Royal Flying Corps in World War I. As such, no further production of the W.B.II took place, however in 1920 two civil examples were produced, named the W.B.IIB.

== Variants ==
W.B.II
2-seat fighter built as a private venture;two built.
W.B.IIa Adriatic
A proposed version to have been powered by the Galloway Adriatic engine.
W.B.IIb
A fast mail-plane civilian variant; two built.

== Specifications (W.B.II) ==
Data from Jane's all the World's Aircraft 1919

General characteristics

- Crew: 2
- Length: 27 ft 3 in (8.31 m)
- Wingspan: 34 ft 10 in (10.62 m)
- Height: 10 ft 11 in (3.33 m)
- Wing area: 354 sq ft (32.9 m^{2})
- Empty weight: 1,765 lb (801 kg)
- Gross weight: 2,650 lb (1,202 kg)
- Fuel capacity: 41.5 imp gal (49.8 US gal; 189 L)
- Powerplant: 1 × Hispano-Suiza 8Bd V-8 water-cooled piston engine, 200 hp (150 kW)
- Propellers: 2-bladed wooden fixed pitch propeller, 9 ft (2.7 m) diameter

Performance

- Maximum speed: 120 mph (190 km/h, 100 kn) at sea level: 111 mph (96 kn; 179 km/h) at 10,000 ft (3,000 m)
- Endurance: 2.8 hours
- Time to altitude: 5,000 ft (1,500 m) in 7 minutes; 10,000 ft (3,000 m) in 15 minutes
- Wing loading: 7.5 lb/sq ft (37 kg/m^{2})
- Power/mass: 13.25 lb/hp (8.06 kg/kW)

Armament

- Guns:
- 2x fixed synchronised forward-mounted 0.303 in (7.7 mm) Vickers machine gun.
- 1x 0.303 in (7.7 mm) Lewis gun on a swivelling mounting in the rear cockpit.

== Bibliography ==
- Owers, Colin (2023). Beardmore Aircraft of WWI: A Centennial Perspective on Great War Airplanes. Great War Aviation Centennial Series. Vol. 69. n.p.: Aeronaut Books. ISBN 978-1-953201-69-0.
