= Berliner-Joyce =

Defunct American aircraft manufacturer

Berliner-Joyce Aircraft
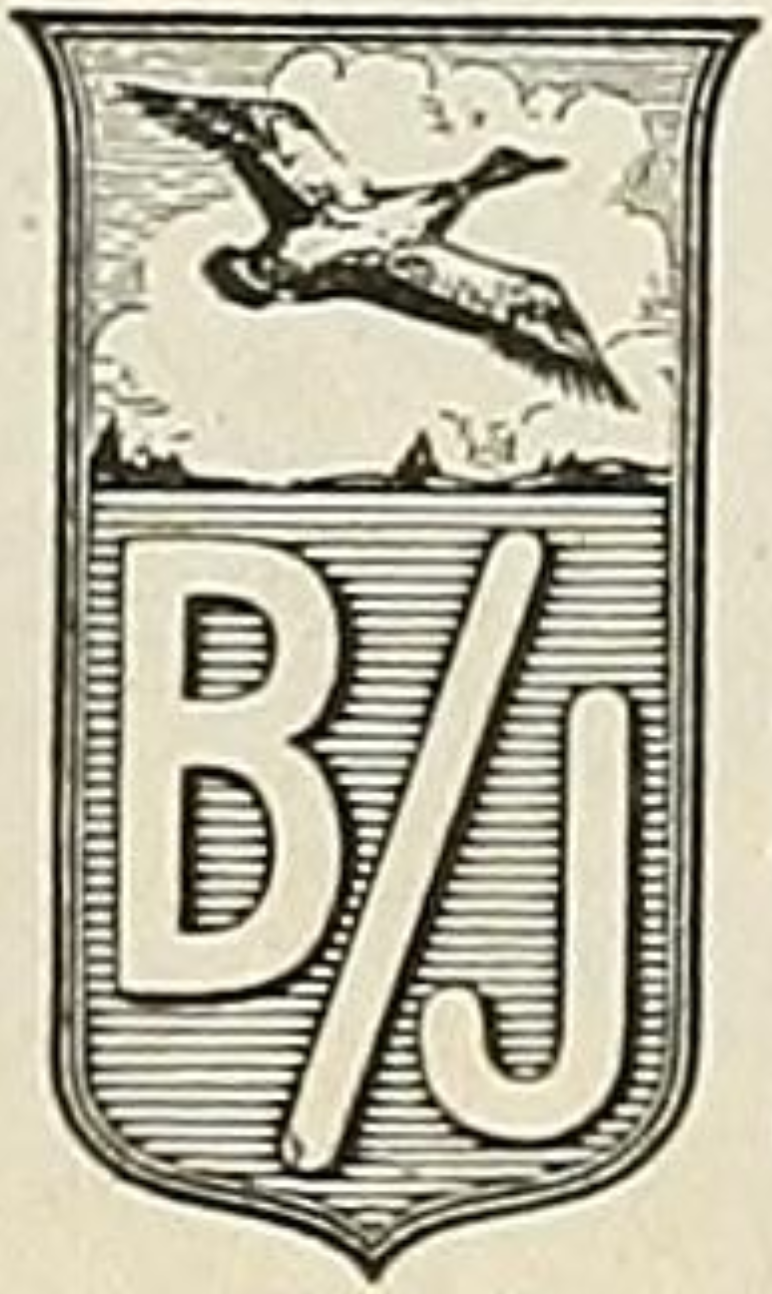
- Industry: Aerospace
- Predecessor: Berliner Aircraft Company
- Founded: February 4, 1929
- Defunct: 1933
- Fate: Acquired
- Successor: North American Aviation
- Headquarters: Alexandria, Virginia, United States
- Key people: Henry Berliner; Temple Nach Joyce

Berliner-Joyce Aircraft was an American aircraft manufacturer.

== History ==
The company was founded on the February 4, 1929, when Henry Berliner and his 1922 company, Berliner Aircraft Company of Alexandria, Virginia, joined with Maryland Aviation Commission leader Captain Temple Nach Joyce.

Berliner-Joyce hired William H. Miller as chief designer, and opened a 58,000 square foot factory in Dundalk, Maryland, near Logan Field. The facility operated one of the largest private Wind tunnel operations of the time. The Great Depression ended the civil aircraft production market, so Berliner-Joyce concentrated on designing aircraft for the USAAC and US Navy.

In May 1929 the company received its first order, for the Berliner-Joyce XFJ. Other projects, the P-16 and OJ-2, also received orders. A merger between the Douglas Aircraft Company and Berliner Joyce was proposed in early 1930, but fell through. Later that same year, North American Aviation bought the company. Later, in 1933, the since renamed B-J Corporation became a subsidiary of a subsidiary when North American Aviation was purchased by General Motors Corporation. In January 1934 Joyce left the company to join Bellanca Aircraft, and soon after Berliner left for Engineering and Research Corporation. The company was then moved from Maryland to Inglewood, California.

== Aircraft ==
Model name	First flight	Number built	Type
Berliner-Joyce CM-4	1928	6	three-seat open-cockpit parasol monoplane
Berliner-Joyce 29-1 Commercial	1929	1	high-wing utility cabin monoplane
Berliner-Joyce XFJ	1930	1	Prototype single-engine biplane fighter
Berliner-Joyce P-16	1929	26	Single engine biplane fighter
Berliner-Joyce OJ	1931	39	Single-engine biplane observation floatplane
Berliner-Joyce F2J	1933	1	Prototype single-engine biplane fighter
Berliner-Joyce XF3J	1934	1	Prototype single-engine biplane fighter
