= Beardmore W.B.1 =

W.B.1

General information
- Type: Bomber
- National origin: British
- Manufacturer: Beardmore
- Designer: G. Tilghman Richards
- Status: Prototype
- Number built: 1

History
- First flight: 1917

The Beardmore W.B.1 was a British single-engine bomber biplane of World War I developed by Beardmore.

== Development and design ==
In 1916, G. Tilghman Richards, the newly appointed chief designer of the aviation department of the Scottish shipbuilder William Beardmore, designed his first aircraft for Beardmore, the W.B.1. This was to be a single engined bomber for the Royal Naval Air Service (RNAS), which was intended to carry out long gliding attacks to achieve surprise. It was a three-bay biplane with long span high aspect ratio wings, which were highly staggered. It was initially powered by a 230 hp (172 kW) Galloway Adriatic engine and first flew in early 1917. The aircraft was also tested with the V8 Sunbeam Crusader.

The W.B.1 was delivered to the RNAS at Cranwell for evaluation on 8 June 1917. By this time however, the larger and more capable Handley Page O/100 was in production and the W.B.1 was rejected by the RNAS.

Some design work was undertaken on a larger and more powerful version of the aircraft, designated the Beardmore W.B.1a, which was to be powered by the 500 hp (370 kW) Galloway Atlantic engine.

== Specifications ==
Data from Mason, The British Bomber since 1912

General characteristics

- Crew: 1
- Length: 32 ft 10 in (10.01 m)
- Wingspan: 61 ft 6 in (18.75 m)
- Height: 14 ft 9 in (4.50 m)
- Wing area: 796 sq ft (74.0 m^{2})
- Empty weight: 3,410 lb (1,550 kg)
- Gross weight: 5,600 lb (2,545 kg)
- Powerplant: 1 × Sunbeam or Galloway Adriatic , 230 hp (172 kW)

Performance

- Maximum speed: 91 mph (147 km/h, 79 kn)
- Endurance: 7.3 hours

Armament

- One .303 in Lewis gun on rear cockpit
- 660 lb (300 kg) bombs

== Sources ==
- Lewis, Peter (1980). The British Bomber since 1912 (Third ed.). London: Putnam. ISBN 0-370-30265-6.
- Mason, Francis K. (1994). The British Bomber since 1912. London: Putnam. ISBN 0-85177-861-5.
- Owers, Colin (2023). Beardmore Aircraft of WWI: A Centennial Perspective on Great War Airplanes. Great War Aviation Centennial Series. Vol. 69. n.p.: Aeronaut Books. ISBN 978-1-953201-69-0.
- Taylor, Michael J. H. (1990). Jane's Fighting Aircraft of World War I. London: Studio Editions.
