= Berliner-Joyce XF2J =

XF2J-1

General information
- Type: Two-seat carrier-based fighter
- National origin: United States
- Manufacturer: Berliner-Joyce
- Primary user: United States Navy
- Number built: 1

History
- First flight: 1933
- Developed from: Berliner-Joyce XFJ

The Berliner-Joyce XF2J was the company's second biplane fighter for the United States Navy. The XF2J was ordered on 30 June 1931 and although designated as a two-seat fighter, it was used as an observation aircraft.

== Design and development ==
The XF2J's construction was all-metal with a fabric covered rudder. The upper wing was "gulled", with a short, sharply upward-angled section, with the remainder of the wing with a slight dihedral. The lower wing span was shorter than the upper wing, and was braced with "N" struts and wires. A .30 calibre machine gun was located in each of the gulled sections of the upper wing and were synchronized to fire through the propeller arc.

The tightly-cowled 9-cylinder Pratt & Whitney R-1690C Hornet was the engine originally specified, but was changed to the 625 hp (466 kW) 14-cylinder Wright SR-1510-92 Whirlwind before the aircraft flew. The propeller was a metal constant speed two-blade design.

The original open cockpits were modified to sliding canopies shortly after delivery to the navy.

== Operational history ==
The XF2J-1 suffered from the same faults as the P-16, resulting in an unfavourable service trial of the one prototype, which had appeared two years late due to a protracted development phase, exacerbated by financial difficulties that eventually led to the demise of the company The poor visibility over the nose and the landing characteristics doomed the XF2J-1, especially in light of the availability of the superior Grumman FF-1.

== Specifications (XF2J-1) ==
Data from Forgotten Fighters/1

General characteristics

- Crew: 2
- Length: 28 ft 10 in (8.79 m)
- Upper wingspan: 36 ft 0 in (10.97 m)
- Wing area: 303.5 sq ft (28.20 m^{2})
- Empty weight: 3,210 lb (1,456 kg)
- Gross weight: 4,539 lb (2,059 kg)
- Max takeoff weight: 4,539 lb (2,059 kg)
- Powerplant: 1 × Wright SR-1510-92 Whirlwind 14-cylinder air-cooled supercharged two-row radial piston engine, 600 hp (450 kW)

Performance

- Maximum speed: 170 kn (196 mph, 315 km/h)

Armament

- Guns: two .30 caliber machine guns mounted in the upper wing root area

== See also ==
Related development

- Berliner-Joyce P-16
- Berliner-Joyce XFJ
