= Kawanishi K-11 =

Japanese carrier-borne fighter prototype

K-11

General information
- Type: Single-seat carrier fighter
- National origin: Japan
- Manufacturer: Kawanishi Aircraft Company
- Number built: 2

History
- First flight: 1927

The Kawanishi K-11 was a 1920s Japanese single-seat carrier fighter designed and built by the Kawanishi Aircraft Company to meet an Imperial Japanese Navy requirement. The type did not enter service, and only two prototypes were built.

== Development and design ==
The K-11 was a private venture programme designed to meet a 1926 Imperial Japanese Navy requirement for a single-seat carrier fighter to replace the Mitsubishi 1MF, competing against officially sponsored designs from Aichi (the Aichi Type H), Mitsubishi (the 1MF9), and Nakajima. The K-11 Experimental Carrier Fighter was an equal-span biplane with a conventional landing gear and powered by 500 hp (373 kW) BMW inline engine. It had a metal fuselage with fabric covering and wooden wings.

The first prototype made its maiden flight in July 1927, with a second prototype, with a modified fuselage and tail, being built in 1928. The type was not accepted by the Navy, however, with the Nakajima design being selected, entering production as the A1N. The two K-11s were used by Kawanishi as communications and liaison aircraft.

== Specifications ==
Data from Japanese Aircraft 1910–1941

General characteristics

- Crew: 1
- Length: 7.88 m (25 ft 10 in)
- Wingspan: 10.80 m (35 ft 5 in)
- Height: 3.28 m (10 ft 9 in)
- Wing area: 33.8 m^{2} (364 sq ft)
- Empty weight: 1,170 kg (2,579 lb)
- Gross weight: 1,750 kg (3,858 lb)
- Powerplant: 1 × BMW VI water-cooled V12 engine, 370 kW (500 hp)

Performance

- Maximum speed: 260 km/h (160 mph, 140 kn)
- Endurance: 3.5 hours
- Service ceiling: 9,000 m (30,000 ft)
- Time to altitude: 3,000 m (9,800 ft) in 5 min 30 s

Armament

- Guns: 2× 7.7mm machine guns

== See also ==
Aircraft of comparable role, configuration, and era

- Aichi Type H
- Mitsubishi 1MF9
- Nakajima A1N
