= Mitsubishi 1MF9 =

Japanese carrier-based fighter prototype

1MF9
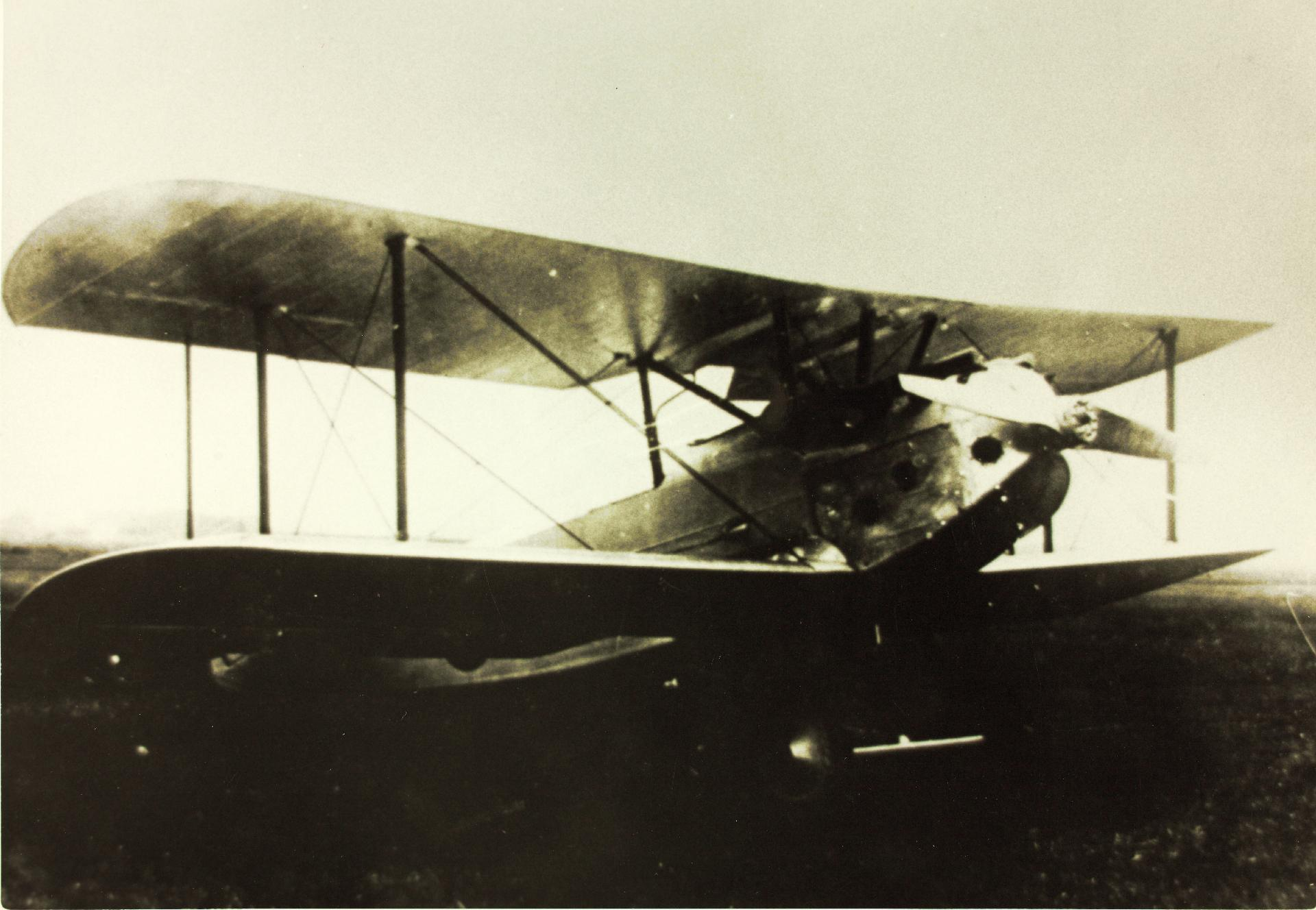

General information
- Type: Carrier-based fighter aircraft
- National origin: Japan
- Manufacturer: Mitsubishi Group
- Number built: 2

History
- First flight: July 1927

The Mitsubishi 1MF9 or Mitsubishi Experimental Taka-type Carrier Fighter was a prototype Japanese fighter aircraft of the 1920s. It was a single-engined, single-seat biplane intended to operate from the Imperial Japanese Navy's aircraft carriers, but only two were built, with the type being rejected by the Navy.

== Design and development ==
The standard carrier-based fighter of the Imperial Japanese Navy in 1926 was the Mitsubishi 1MF or Navy Type 10 Carrier Type Fighter, designed in 1921 by the ex-Sopwith British designer Herbert Smith. In April that year, a specification was issued to Mitsubishi, Aichi and Nakajima for a replacement for the Type 10, requiring the aircraft to stay afloat in the event of ditching in the sea. Mitsubishi gave the task of designing the new fighter to Joji Hattori, who had worked with Smith on the design of the Type 10. The resultant aircraft, the Experimental Taka-type (Falcon) fighter or 1MF9, was a single-bay biplane of wooden construction with fabric covering. It had a watertight fuselage and jettisonable fixed conventional landing gear to meet the Navy's ditching requirements (jettisonable because aircraft with fixed landing gear are very dangerous to land on water, since the drag from the water can easily flip the aircraft over when the wheels touch the surface), and was powered by a Mitsubishi Hi V-12 (licence-built Hispano-Suiza Lb). The pilot sat in an open cockpit, armed with two synchronised machine guns.

== Operational history ==
The first of two prototypes flew in July 1927, being the first Japanese designed carrier-based fighter to fly, with the second following in September. It was not successful, with the design proposed by Nakajima, a modified version of the British Gloster Gamecock fighter being chosen for production as the Nakajima A1N, despite the fact that Nakajima and Gloster had chosen to ignore the requirement for easy ditching, allowing a lighter and more manoeuvrable aircraft.

== Specifications ==
Data from Japanese Aircraft 1910–1941

General characteristics

- Crew: 1
- Length: 8.443 m (27 ft 8 in)
- Wingspan: 10.80 m (35 ft 5 in)
- Height: 3.403 m (11 ft 2 in)
- Wing area: 41.50 m^{2} (446.7 sq ft)
- Empty weight: 1,200 kg (2,646 lb)
- Gross weight: 1,855 kg (4,090 lb)
- Powerplant: 1 × Mitsubishi Hi V-12 water-cooled V12 engine, 450 kW (600 hp)

Performance

- Maximum speed: 244 km/h (152 mph, 132 kn)
- Service ceiling: 7,000 m (23,000 ft)
- Time to altitude: 3,000 m (9,800 ft) in 6 min 10 s

Armament

- Guns: 2× 7.7 mm machine guns

== See also ==
Aircraft of comparable role, configuration, and era

- Aichi Type H
- Kawanishi K-11
- Nakajima A1N
