= Beardmore W.B.V =

British aircraft

W.B.V
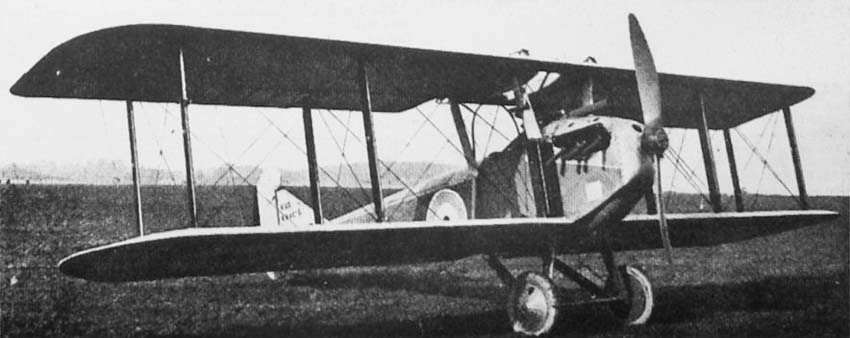

General information
- Type: Fighter
- National origin: United Kingdom
- Manufacturer: Beardmore
- Designer: G. Tilghman Richards
- Status: Prototype
- Number built: 2

History
- First flight: 3 December 1917
- Developed from: Beardmore W.B.IV

The Beardmore W.B.V was a prototype British single-engine shipborne biplane fighter of World War I developed by Beardmore. It was not successful, only two being completed.

== Development and design ==
At the same time as developing the Beardmore W.B.IV, G. Tilghman Richards, the chief designer of Beardmore, designed a second aircraft to meet an Admiralty requirement for a ship-borne fighter aircraft to be armed with a 37 mm Le-Puteaux quick firing gun in order to destroy airships. The resulting aircraft, the W.B.V, was a single seater two-bay tractor biplane powered by a 200 hp (149 kW) Hispano-Suiza engine. The wings folded for storage on board ship. The manually loaded Le-Puteaux gun was mounted between the cylinder banks of the V-8 engine, firing through a hollow propeller shaft. Unlike the W.B.V, the W.B.IV was not fitted with a buoyancy chamber, being instead fitted with inflatable flotation bags.

The first prototype flew on 3 December 1917. During testing, the Le Puteaux gun was considered dangerous by RNAS pilots, and the aircraft was re-armed with a more conventional synchronised Vickers machine gun together with a Lewis gun mounted on a tripod mounting. Development was abandoned shortly after the completion of a second prototype.

== Specifications ==
Data from Jane's Fighting Aircraft of World War I.

General characteristics

- Crew: 1
- Length: 26 ft 7 in (8.10 m)
- Wingspan: 35 ft 10 in (10.92 m)
- Height: 11 ft 10 in (3.61 m)
- Wing area: 394 sq ft (36.6 m^{2})
- Empty weight: 1,860 lb (845 kg)
- Gross weight: 2,500 lb (1,136 kg)
- Powerplant: 1 × Hispano-Suiza 8 , 200 hp (149 kW)

Performance

- Maximum speed: 112 mph (180 km/h, 97 kn)
- Stall speed: 45 mph (72 km/h, 39 kn)
- Endurance: 2 hours 30 minutes
- Service ceiling: 14,000 ft (4,270 m)

Armament

- One 37 mm Le Puteaux quick firing gun firing through the propeller shaft or One .303 in Vickers machine gun and one Lewis gun

== See also ==
Related development

- Beardmore W.B.IV

Aircraft of comparable role, configuration, and era

- SPAD S.XII

== Bibliography ==
- Bruce, J.M. (1965). War Planes of the First World War: Volume 1 Fighters. London: Macdonald.
- Green, William & Swanborough, Gordon (2001) [1994]. The Complete Book of Fighters: An Illustrated Encyclopedia of Every Fighter Built and Flown (Revised and Updated ed.). London: Salamander Books. ISBN 1-84065-269-1.
- Mason, Francis K (1992). The British Fighter since 1912. Annapolis, Maryland: Naval Institute Press. ISBN 1-55750-082-7.
- Owers, Colin (2023). Beardmore Aircraft of WWI: A Centennial Perspective on Great War Airplanes. Great War Aviation Centennial Series. Vol. 69. n.p.: Aeronaut Books. ISBN 978-1-953201-69-0.
- Taylor, Michael J. H., ed. (1990). Jane's Fighting Aircraft of World War I. London: Studio Editions. p. 57.
