= Blackburn Blackburd =

Type of aircraft

Blackburd
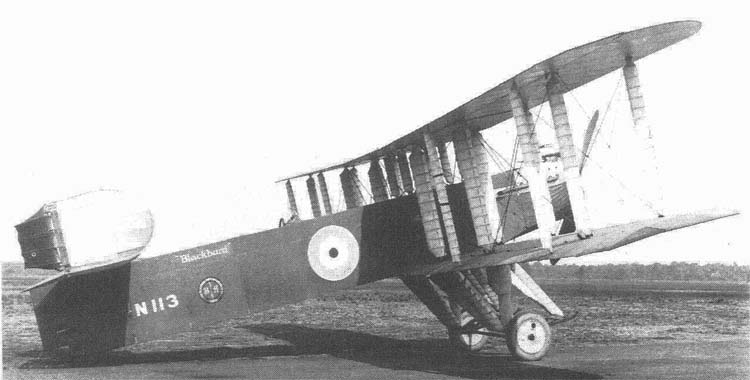

General information
- Type: Torpedo bomber
- Manufacturer: Blackburn Aircraft
- Designer: Harris Booth
- Status: Prototype
- Number built: Three

History
- First flight: 1918

The Blackburn Blackburd was a British prototype single-engine torpedo bomber developed by Blackburn Aircraft in 1918 as a replacement for the Sopwith Cuckoo. It was unsuccessful, only three being built.

== Design and development ==
In January 1918, the Admiralty issued specification N.1B, seeking an aircraft to replace the Sopwith Cuckoo torpedo bomber. While the Cuckoo was successful, it could only carry a 1,000 lb (450 kg) Mark IX torpedo, which was not believed to be powerful enough to sink large armoured warships. The specification therefore required an aircraft capable of carrying a 1,436 lb (651 kg) Mark VII torpedo, which had a much larger warhead.

In response, Harris Booth designed the Blackburd, a large, three-bay biplane with unswept, unstaggered wings and a slab-sided fuselage. The Blackburd's simple lines were designed to facilitate rapid production and the wings were able to fold backwards to allow storage in a ship's hangar. Unusually, the pilot's cockpit was situated towards the rear of the aircraft, with 17 ft (5.2 m) of fuselage ahead of the windscreen. The Blackburd's undercarriage had to be jettisoned before the torpedo could be dropped, requiring the aircraft to land on steel skids.

The first Blackburd flew in May 1918, and was delivered to Martlesham Heath for evaluation against the Short Shirl. The Blackburd was found to be unstable, with the first prototype crashing before trials were complete. The second and third aircraft were fitted with an enlarged rudder. The Blackburd was considered to be inferior to the Shirl and was not ordered. Although orders were placed for production of the Shirl, they were almost immediately cancelled in favour of orders for more Sopwith Cuckoos.

== Specifications ==
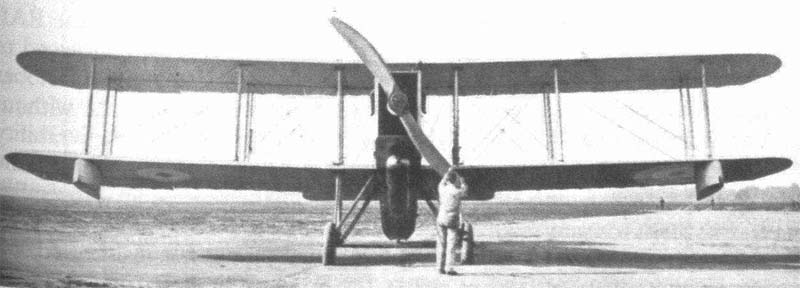
Front view of the Blackburd.

Data from The British Bomber Since 1914

General characteristics

- Crew: 1
- Length: 34 ft 10 in (10.62 m)
- Wingspan: 52 ft 5 in (15.98 m)
- Height: 12 ft 4.5 in (3.772 m)
- Wing area: 684 sq ft (63.5 m^{2})
- Empty weight: 3,228 lb (1,464 kg)
- Gross weight: 5,700 lb (2,585 kg)
- Powerplant: 1 × Rolls-Royce Eagle VIII V-12 water-cooled piston engine, 350 hp (260 kW)
- Propellers: 2-bladed fixed-pitch propeller

Performance

- Maximum speed: 91 mph (146 km/h, 79 kn) with torpedo
- Endurance: 3 hours
- Service ceiling: 11,000 ft (3,400 m)
- Time to altitude: 6,500 ft (1,981 m) in 16 minutes 15 seconds
- Wing loading: 8.33 lb/sq ft (40.7 kg/m^{2})
- Power/mass: 0.061 hp/lb (0.100 kW/kg)

Armament

- One 1,423 lb (645 kg) Admiralty Mark VIII torpedo

== See also ==
Aircraft of comparable role, configuration, and era

- Short Shirl
