= G. Tilghman Richards =

George Tilghman Richards
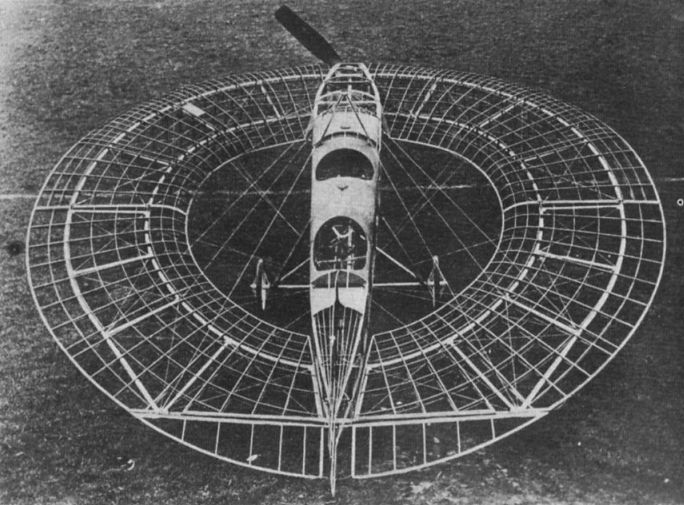
- The first annular monoplane
- Born: 18 August 1883; Altrincham, Cheshire
- Died: 22 June 1960 (aged 76); Hove, Sussex
- Occupations: Aeronautical engineer Museum curator
- Parent(s): George Richards, Amy Florence Richards

George Tilghman Richards (1883–1960), usually known as G. Tilghman Richards, was a British aeronautical engineer, mechanical engineer, and Science Museum, London curator, best known for his work on the Lee-Richards annular aeroplanes.

Richards was a Fellow of the Royal Aeronautical Society (FRAeS), Member of the Institute of Aeronautical Engineers (MIAeE), Member of the Institution of Mechanical Engineers (M.I. Mech.E.), and a chartered mechanical engineer.

== Early life ==
George Tilghman Richards was born in Altrincham, Cheshire on 18 August 1883, the only son of George Richards, originally from Philadelphia, USA, and Amy Florence Richards (nee Ford-Smith).

Richards received his engineering training at his father's firms, George Richards and Company, and Tilghmans Patent Sand Blast Company (the two companies merged in 1896 but retained separate premises), and Smith and Coventry Ltd. All three companies manufactured machine tools and industrial machinery.

Between 1904 and 1908, Richards gained further professional engineering experience, first as a leading draughtsman and automotive engineer working for Rolls-Royce from 1904 to 1906 and from 1906 to 1908 as a designer at Belsize. By 1908, Richards had gained sufficient experience to set up as an independent consultant in Manchester, a position he held until 1911.

== Lee-Richards annular aeroplanes ==
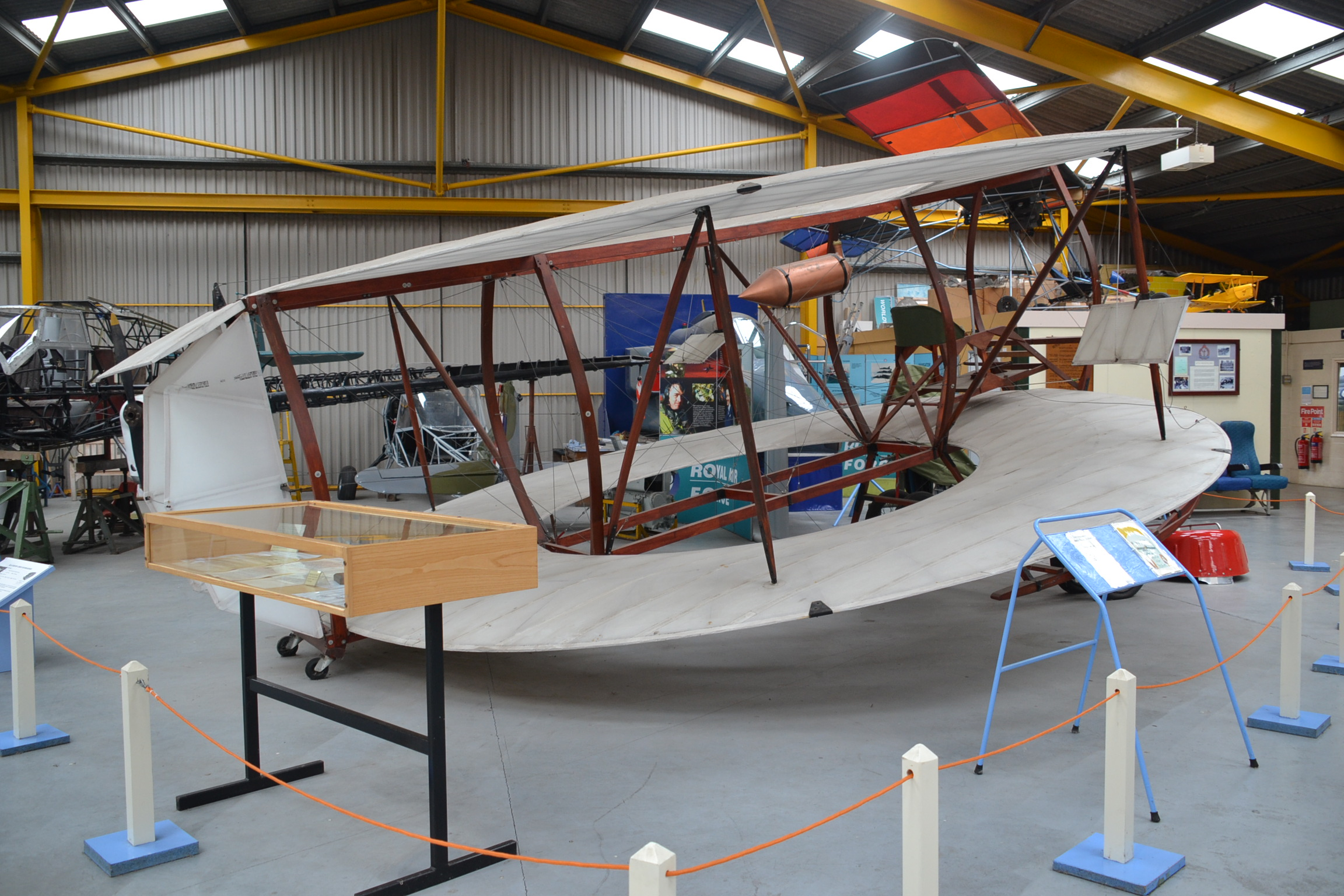
Non-flying replica of the biplane

In 1911, Cedric Lee approached Richards to work on an annular biplane which he had acquired half-finished from British inventor J.G.A. Kitchen (1869-1940). Together, Lee and Richards finished the aeroplane, fitting a 50 hp (37 kW) Gnome Omega engine in the front.

Between 1911 and the outbreak of war in August 1914, Richards was engaged in original research and experimental aviation, almost entirely relating to this machine and other variations, known variously as the Kitchen annular biplane and the Lee-Richards annular biplane and referred to as the flying doughnut due to its unusual circular wing shape. Flight tests in 1911 were disappointing and that Autumn the biplane was destroyed on the ground by high winds, when its hangar collapsed. A non-flying replica later appeared in the 1965 film Those magnificent men in their flying machines and is now on display at the Newark Air Museum.

Lee and Richards continued experimenting with models and Richards especially further developed the aerodynamic theory of the annular wing. They developed a form having a circular lower wing with an auxiliary plane above the front half of the main wing. A full-size manned glider proved successful. Model tests of a new design at the National Physics Laboratory gave promising results, confirming that an annular monoplane would be aerodynamically stable and have benign stalling characteristics. In 1912, the two continued to work on and test the aircraft at Shoreham Aerodrome (now Brighton City Airport).

From 1913 to 1914, three monoplanes were built and flown. All were stable in flight and successively showed improved handling. Richards continuef to promote the benefits of the annular wing throughout his life, but without success. While working for Beardmore in 1916 he patented an improved method of construction.

== First World War and aftermath ==
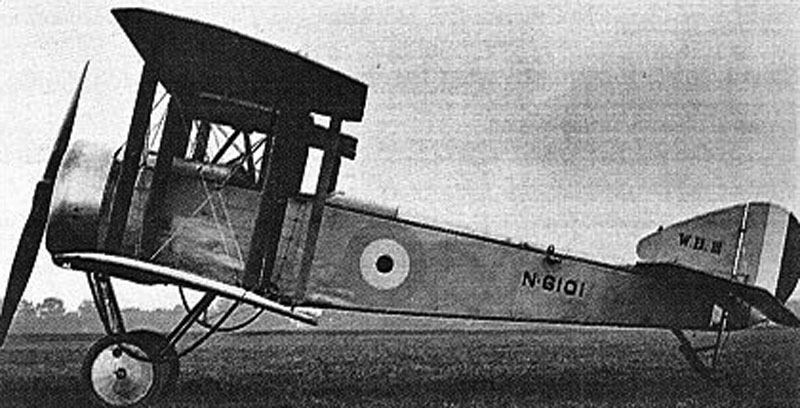
The Beardmore W.B.III

When war broke out, Richards was commissioned into the Royal Naval Air Service (RNAS) as an inspector of Naval aircraft. He was sent to Beardmore, who were manufacturing other companies' designs under licence. In January 1916, when Beardmore’s design office was created, Richards was allowed to resign his commission to become assistant manager and designer. From 1916 to 1917 he produced their first in-house aircraft designs, achieving his greatest success with the W.B.III, a navalised version of the Sopwith Pup which Beardmore were manufacturing under license. Other Beardmore types which he designed included the W.B.1, W.B.2, W.B.IV, W.B.V and W.B.VI but these only got as far as the prototype stage and it was only the W.B.III which made it into production.

After the war there was little demand for aircraft but Richards continued to work in the field of aviation until 1924, first at Beardmore and then from 1921 at Martinsyde, Woking, where he was employed as general manager as they were changing over from aircraft manufacture to motor cycles.

== Science Museum ==
In 1924, Richards began working for the Science Museum, London as a curator and lecturer, specialising in aeronautics and later typewriters. By 1939, Richards was senior lecturer in Engineering and Industry at the museum and he remained there until his retirement in 1954.

In 1937, a 1:10 scale model of a Lee-Richards annular-type monoplane was commissioned by the Science Museum workshop and put on display. In 1938, Richards wrote a Science Museum handbook Handbook of the collection illustrating typewriters, later reissued as The History and Development of Typewriters. In 1954, he retired from the Science Museum.

== Society Membership ==
Richards was a member of the British Gliding Association and the Newcomen Society and was a founding member of the Manchester Aero Club, established in 1908.

Richards was also a chartered member of a number of professional engineering organisations. He was a Fellow of the Royal Aeronautical Society (FRAeS), Member of the Institute of Aeronautical Engineers (MIAeE), Member of the Institution of Mechanical Engineers (M.I. Mech.E.), and a chartered mechanical engineer.

== Death and legacy ==
Richards died on 22 June 1960 at Hove, Sussex at the age of 76. Papers by Cedric Lee and Richards relating to their work on the Lee-Richards Annular Monoplane between 1911 and 1914 are held by the National Aerospace Library at the Royal Aeronautical Society.
