= Beardmore W.B.VI =

W.B.VI

General information
- Type: Torpedo bomber
- National origin: British
- Manufacturer: Beardmore
- Designer: G. Tilghman Richards
- Status: Unbuilt design

The Beardmore W.B.VI was a British single-engined folding wing torpedo bomber biplane of World War I proposed by Beardmore.

== Specifications (proposal) ==
Data from

General characteristics

- Crew: 1
- Length: 34 ft 0 in (10.36 m)
- Wingspan: 53 ft 6.5 in (17.21 m)
- Height: 12 ft 6 in (3.81 m)
- Wing area: 795 sq ft (73.85 m^{2})
- Empty weight: 3,027 lb (1,373 kg)
- Gross weight: 5,637 lb (2,557 kg)
- Powerplant: 1 × Rolls-Royce Eagle , 350 hp (261 kW)

Performance

- Cruise speed: 102 mph (193 km/h, 89 kn)
- Endurance: 3 hours

Armament

- 1x torpedo
