= Berliner-Joyce XFJ =

XFJ
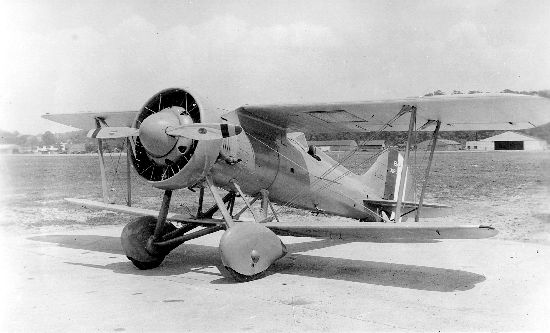
- The XFJ-2

General information
- Type: carrier based fighter
- National origin: United States
- Manufacturer: Berliner-Joyce Aircraft

History
- First flight: 22 May 1931

The Berliner-Joyce XFJ was a United States prototype biplane fighter aircraft that first flew in May 1930. Designed by Berliner-Joyce Aircraft for the United States Navy, its lower wing, placed below the fuselage and just two feet above the ground, apparently gave it a tendency to ground loop when landing, and it was never ordered for production.

== Development and design ==
Berliner-Joyce had been formed in 1929, and had won a contract with the United States Army for the Berliner-Joyce P-16 aircraft. At the same time, they submitted a similar design to the Navy, modified to meet the differing requirements, which included a metal-skinned semi-monocoque fuselage, shoulder-mounted upper wings and a lower wing underslung on cabane-type struts.

The prototype, XFJ-1, was sent to Anacostia for testing after its initial flights, where the ground-looping habit was noted, and eventually resulted in a landing accident, necessitating return and repair. The company took the opportunity to add a Townend ring engine cowling, and upgraded the engine from a 450-hp Pratt & Whitney R-1340C to a 500-hp R-1340-92 Wasp. This and other improvements boosted speed from 177 to 193 mph (285 to 311 km/h), and the Navy gave the reconstructed aircraft the designation XFJ-2. However, improved performance came at the expense of stability, and the ground loop problem persisted, and there was no interest in continuing with this design. Nevertheless, the prototype continued to be used for other tests for several years.

== Specifications (XFJ-1) ==
Data from The American Fighter from 1917 to the present

General characteristics

- Crew: 2
- Length: 20 ft 7 in (6.27 m)
- Wingspan: 28 ft 0 in (8.53 m)
- Height: 9 ft 10 in (3.00 m)
- Wing area: 179 sq ft (16.6 m^{2})
- Empty weight: 2,046 lb (928 kg)
- Gross weight: 2,797 lb (1,269 kg)
- Powerplant: 1 × Pratt & Whitney R-1340-C 9-cylinder air-cooled radial piston engine, 450 hp (340 kW)
- Propellers: 2-bladed propeller

Performance

- Maximum speed: 172 mph (277 km/h, 149 kn)
- Range: 404 mi (650 km, 351 nmi)
- Service ceiling: 23,800 ft (7,300 m)
- Rate of climb: 1,282 ft/min (6.51 m/s)

Armament

- Guns: 2x 0.300 in (7.6 mm) machine-guns
