= Vought XF8U-3 Crusader III =

Fighter aircraft in the US Navy

XF8U-3 Crusader III
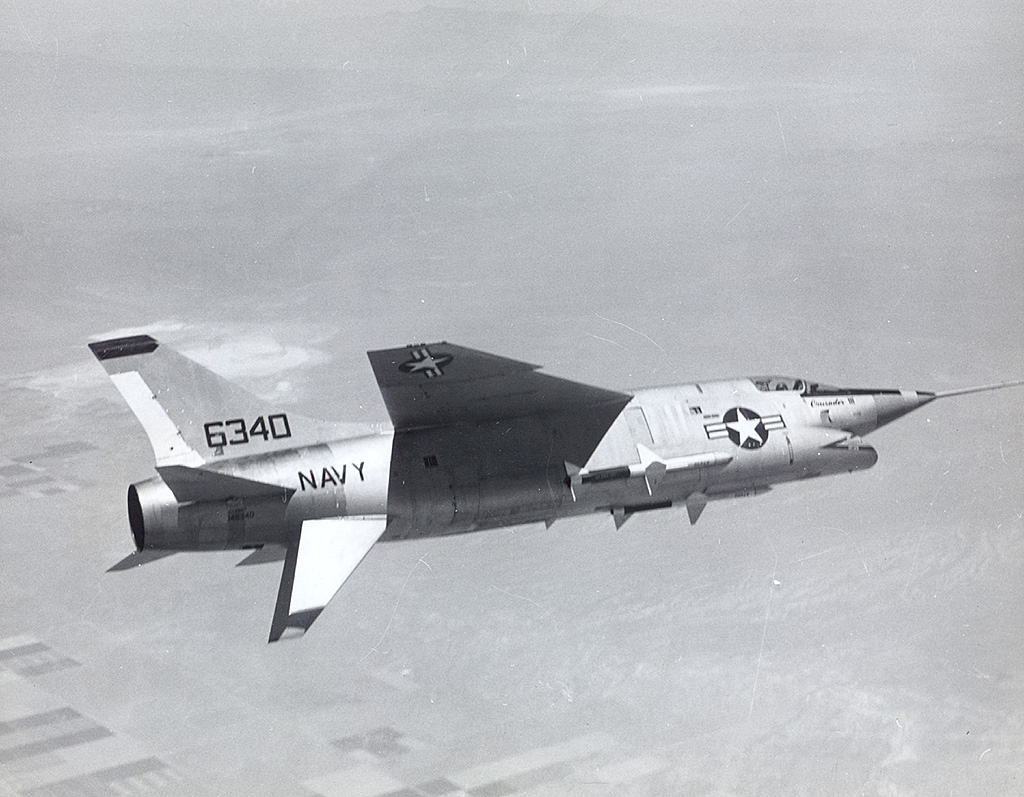
- Unlike the F-8 Crusader, the F8U-3 featured ventral fins, shown here deployed.

General information
- Type: Fighter aircraft
- Manufacturer: Chance Vought
- Status: Canceled
- Primary users: United States Navy NASA
- Number built: 5

History
- First flight: 2 June 1958
- Developed from: Vought F-8 Crusader

The Vought XF8U-3 Crusader III was an aircraft developed by Chance Vought as a successor to the successful Vought F-8 Crusader program and as a competitor to the McDonnell Douglas F-4 Phantom II. Though based in spirit on the F8U-1 and F8U-2, and sharing the older aircraft's designation in the old Navy system, the two aircraft shared few parts.

== Design and development ==
In parallel with the F8U-1s and -2s, the Crusader design team was also working on a larger aircraft with better performance, designated within Vought as the V-401. Although externally similar to the Crusader and sharing with it the variable incidence wing, the Crusader III was larger and was powered by the Pratt & Whitney J75-P-5A engine generating 29,500 lbf (131 kN) of afterburning thrust.

The Crusader III was designed for brief excursions to Mach 2.7 and two visible features showed it had a speed capability beyond that of the earlier Crusaders, namely a swept-forward "Ferri scoop" air inlet for the engine and two large ventral fins. Another Vought aircraft, the Mach 2 cruise missile SSM-N-9 Regulus II would also use a Ferri scoop inlet and ventral fin.

The inlet used three shock waves with external and internal supersonic compression as the air slowed before entering the engine. The final shock has to move inside the inlet, known as starting, and when the aircraft reaches the relevant speed the swept-back sides were necessary to allow the air to spill from the downstream side of the shock as it moved inside.

The directional stability of an aircraft is provided by its vertical fin. This stability progressively decreases beyond Mach 1 due to a decrease in fin lift-curve slope. More vertical surface area has to be added, often with ventral fins, to maintain adequate stability. When the Crusader II was introduced, with a higher thrust engine, it also had its fin area supplemented with two ventral fins which gave it a speed limit of Mach 1.7 beyond which stability was no longer acceptable. The size of the two fins needed on the Crusader III, with a speed reaching Mach 2.7, required them to be turned horizontally when taking off and landing.

To ensure sufficient performance, Vought made provisions for a Rocketdyne XLF-40 liquid-fueled rocket motor with 8,000 lbf (35.6 kN) of thrust in addition to the turbojet. Avionics included the AN/AWG-7 fire control computer, AN/APQ-74 radar, and AN/ASQ-19 datalink. The system was expected to simultaneously track six and engage two targets.

Due to extensive changes as compared to the F8U-1, the F8U-2 was labeled by some as the "Crusader II", and as a result, the XF8U-3 was officially labeled "Crusader III."

== Operational history ==
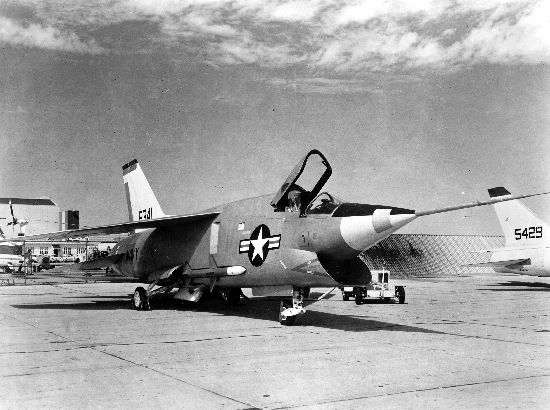
A view of the XF8U-3's chin inlet shows it to be drastically different from its predecessor, the Vought F-8 Crusader

The XF8U-3 first flew on 2 June 1958. Despite claims by many books and articles that the aircraft reached Mach 2.6 at 35,000 ft (10,670 m) during testing, the maximum speed achieved was Mach 2.39, and normal operating speed was no more than Mach 2.32. The first time that the aircraft exceeded Mach 2.0 in level flight was on August 14, during its 38th test flight, well before the rival F4H-1 did so. Some sources state that Vought projected a top speed of Mach 2.9 with the tail rocket installed, though the windscreen and most aluminum airframes were not designed to withstand the effects of kinetic heating at speeds of more than Mach 2.35. Demonstrated zoom ceiling was over 76,000 ft (23,170 m). In December 1955, the US Navy declared a competition for a Mach 2+ fleet defense interceptor. Fly-offs against the Crusader III's main competitor, the future McDonnell Douglas F-4 Phantom II, demonstrated that the Vought design had a definite advantage in maneuverability. John Konrad, Vought's chief test pilot, later stated that the Crusader III could fly circles around the Phantom II. Combat thrust-to-weight ratio (T/W ratio) was almost unity (0.97), while early F4H was only at 0.87. However, the pilot in the XF8U-3 was easily overwhelmed with the workload required to fly the intercept phase and fire Sparrow missiles which required constant radar illumination from the firing aircraft, while the Phantom II had a radar intercept officer to share the workload.

In addition, with the perception that the 'age of the gun' was over, the Phantom's considerably larger payload and the ability to perform air-to-ground as well as air-to-air missions, won over Vought's fast but single-purposed fighter. For similar reasons, the Phantom would replace the Navy's F-8 Crusader as the primary daylight air superiority fighter in the Vietnam War, although it was originally introduced as a missile-armed interceptor to complement day fighters like the Crusader.

The F8U-3 program was cancelled with five aircraft built. Three aircraft flew during the test program, and, along with two other airframes, were transferred to NASA for atmospheric testing, as the Crusader III was capable of flying above 95% of the Earth's atmosphere. NASA pilots flying at NAS Patuxent River routinely intercepted and defeated U.S. Navy Phantom IIs in mock dogfights, until complaints from the Navy put an end to the harassment.

All of the Crusader IIIs were later scrapped.

== Operators ==
United States

- United States Navy
- NASA

== Specifications ==
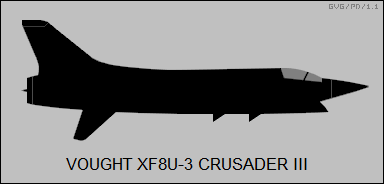
Orthographically projected diagram of the XF8U-3 Crusader III.

Data from The Great Book of Fighters,American Fighter Aircraft, and MiG Master

General characteristics

- Crew: 1 pilot
- Length: 58 ft 8 in (17.88 m)
- Wingspan: 39 ft 11 in (12.16 m)
- Height: 16 ft 4 in (4.98 m)
- Wing area: 450 sq ft (41.8 m^{2})
- Empty weight: 21,860 lb (9,915 kg)
- Gross weight: 32,320 lb (14,660 kg)
- Max takeoff weight: 38,770 lb (17,590 kg)
- Fuel capacity: 2,036 US gal (7,707 L) or 13,234 lb (6,003 kg)
- Powerplant: 1 × Pratt & Whitney J75-P-5A afterburning turbojet, 16,500 lbf (73 kN) thrust dry, 29,500 lbf (131 kN) with afterburner

Performance

- Maximum speed: 1,370 kn (1,577 mph, 2,538 km/h)
- Maximum speed: Mach 2.39 demonstrated at 50,000 ft (15,000 m)
- Cruise speed: 500 kn (575 mph, 925 km/h)
- Combat range: 560 nmi (645 mi, 1,040 km)
- Ferry range: 1,777 nmi (2,045 mi, 3,290 km) with external fuel
- Service ceiling: 65,000 ft (19,800 m)
- Rate of climb: 32,500 ft/min (165 m/s)
- Wing loading: 72 lb/sq ft (350 kg/m^{2})
- Thrust/weight: 0.74 at take-off, 0.97 at combat weight

Armament

- Guns: 4 × 20 mm (0.79 in) Colt Mk 12 cannon (planned; never installed)
- Missiles:
  - 3 × AIM-7 Sparrow radar-guided missiles
  - 4 × AIM-9 Sidewinder missiles

Avionics

- Raytheon Aero 1B weapons control system, including:
  - Autotechnics AN/AWG-7 missile control system
  - AN/APQ-50 radar

== See also ==
Related development

- Vought F-8 Crusader
- LTV A-7 Corsair II

Aircraft of comparable role, configuration, and era

- Grumman XF12F
- McDonnell Douglas F-4 Phantom II

Related lists

- List of fighter aircraft
- List of military aircraft of the United States
