= Berliner-Joyce OJ =

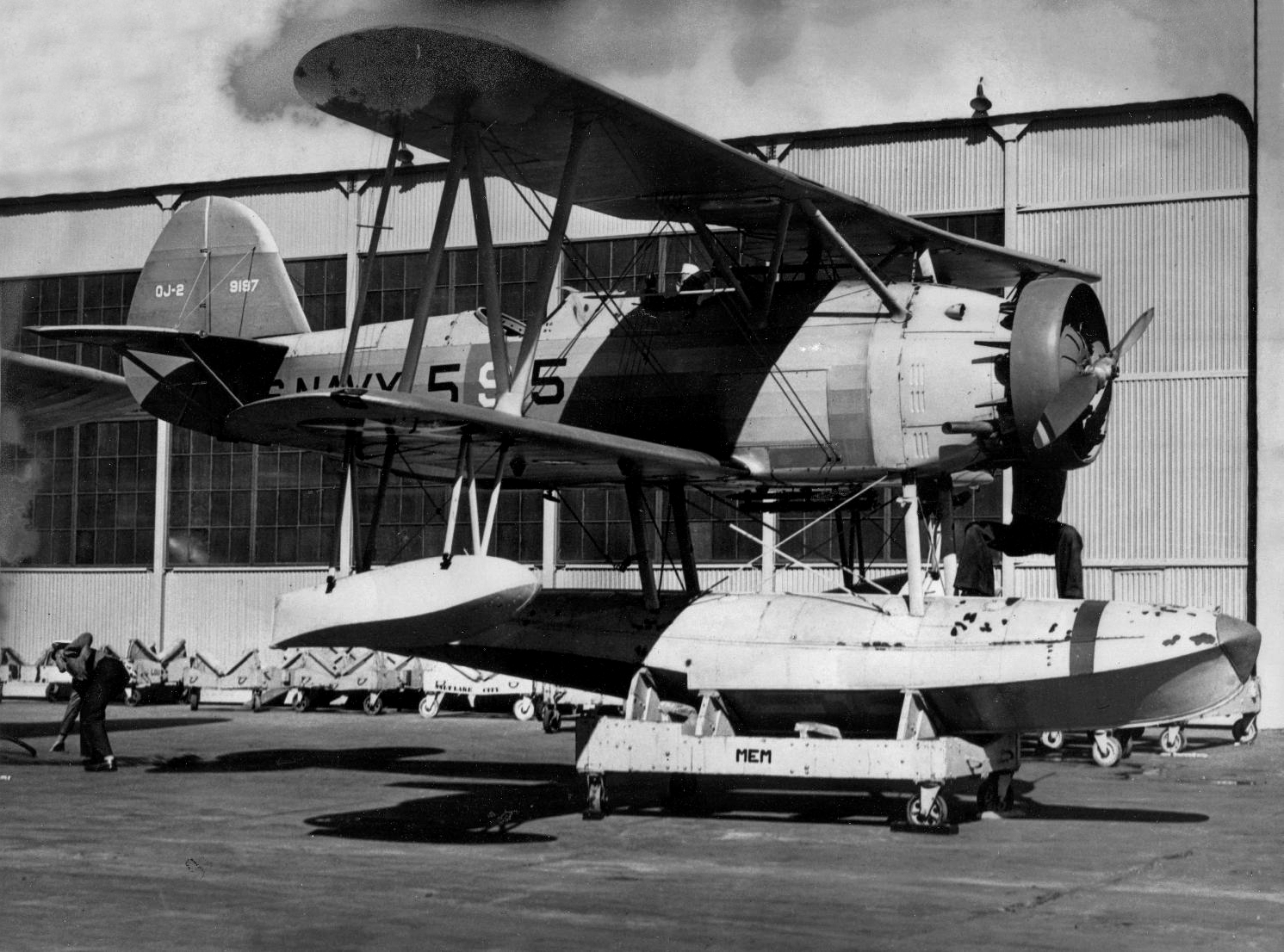
- OJ-2 at NAS San Diego

General information
- Type: Observation
- National origin: United States
- Manufacturer: Berliner-Joyce Aircraft
- Primary user: United States Navy
- Number built: 39

History
- Introduction date: 1933
- First flight: 1931
- Retired: 1941

The Berliner-Joyce OJ was an American biplane observation floatplane developed by the Berliner-Joyce Aircraft for the United States Navy during the early 1930s.

== Design and development ==
The origins of the OJ stemmed from a 1929 Bureau of Aeronautics (BuAer) requirement calling for an observation seaplane intended for service aboard Omaha class light cruisers, readily convertible to wheels or floats and light enough to operate from the cruiser-type catapult. Prototypes were ordered from Keystone-Loening (then a subsidiary of Curtiss-Wright), Berliner-Joyce and Vought, and designated as the XOK-1, XOJ-1 and XO4U-1 respectively.

The Berliner Joyce design, a conventional biplane of mixed metal and fabric construction with staggered wings and the pilot and observer seated in tandem in open cockpits, first flew in May 1931. By that time the rival XOK-1 was already destroyed in a crash. Following trials that lasted into 1932, BuAer awarded Berliner-Joyce a contract.

An order for 18 production aircraft designated OJ-2 was placed in March 1932, and two more orders followed, one in May 1933 for nine aircraft and a further 12 aircraft in December 1933 for use by reserve units.

One OJ-2 modified in early 1934 with an NACA-type cowling and enclosed cockpits was delivered for trials as the XOJ-3, but after a crash it was rebuilt and returned to service as an OJ-2.

== Operational history ==
The OJ entered service with VS-5B and VS-6B in 1933 mainly for use on Omaha class light cruisers. Some OJs were used by reserve units with the first being VN-6R which were based near Washington to train reserve pilots and to enable staff officers to maintain their flying categories. By 1936 all the remaining aircraft were operated by reserve units and at the outbreak of the Second World War 29 aircraft were still in service. The Navy stopped the overhaul program for the aircraft and by the middle of 1941 all of them had been struck off charge.

Unusually for its generation, only four aircraft were lost in accidents without any loss of life.

== Variants ==
XOJ-1
Prototype powered by a 400hp R-985-1 Wasp Junior radial engine, one built.
OJ-2
Production variant which had interchangeable floats or wheeled landing gear, 39 built.
XOJ-3
One production OJ-2 modified with NACA cowling and enclosed cockpit; later reverted to the standard OJ-2 configuration and returned to service.

== Operators ==
United States

- United States Navy
  - VS-5B
  - VS-6B

== Specifications (OJ-2) ==
Data from

General characteristics

- Crew: 2 (pilot and observer)
- Length: 25 ft 8 in (7.82 m)
- Wingspan: 33 ft 8 in (10.26 m)
- Height: 10 ft 10 in (3.30 m)
- Wing area: 284.2 sq ft (26.40 m^{2})
- Empty weight: 2,323 lb (1,054 kg)
- Gross weight: 3,629 lb (1,646 kg)
- Powerplant: 1 × Wright R-975-88 Wasp Junior radial engine, 400 hp (300 kW)

Performance

- Maximum speed: 151 mph (243 km/h, 131 kn)
- Stall speed: 57 mph (92 km/h, 50 kn)
- Range: 530 mi (850 km, 460 nmi)
- Service ceiling: 15,300 ft (4,700 m)
- Rate of climb: 826 ft/min (4.20 m/s) , climb to 10,000 ft in 12.1 min

Armament

- Guns: 1× fixed, forward firing .30 in machine gun, 1× flexibly mounted .30 in machine gun in the rear cockpit
- Bombs: 250 lb (110 kg) bombs under wing

== See also ==
Aircraft of comparable role, configuration, and era

- Curtiss SOC Seagull
- Keystone XOK
- Vought O4U Corsair

Related lists

- List of United States Navy aircraft designations (pre-1962)
- List of flying boats and floatplanes
