= Berliner-Joyce XF3J =

XF3J
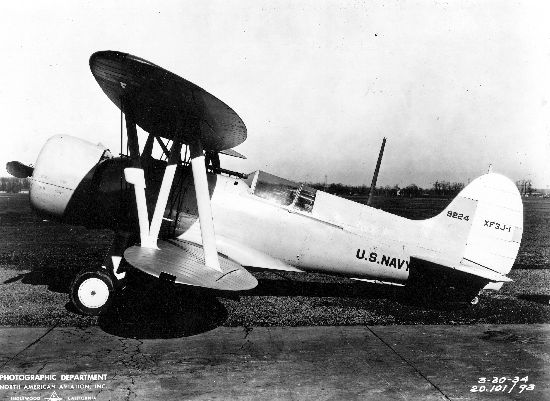

General information
- Type: Fighter
- National origin: United States
- Manufacturer: Berliner-Joyce Aircraft
- Primary user: United States Navy
- Number built: 1

History
- First flight: 23 January 1934

The Berliner-Joyce XF3J was an American biplane fighter, built by Berliner-Joyce Aircraft. It was submitted to the United States Navy for their request for a single-seat carrier-based fighter powered by a 625 hp (466 kW) Wright R-1510-26 engine.

== Development and design ==
The XF3J had elliptical fabric covered wings which gave it the appearance of a butterfly. The fuselage was semimonocoque metallic with an aluminum skin. The undercarriage was fixed, and would be the last biplane fighter without a retractable gear that the U.S. Navy would test. The aircraft performed satisfactorily in testing, but more promising aircraft had been developed and, in September 1935, the program was terminated.

== Specifications (XF3J) ==
Data from

General characteristics

- Crew: 1
- Length: 22 ft 11 in (6.99 m)
- Wingspan: 29 ft 0 in (8.84 m)
- Height: 10 ft 9 in (3.28 m)
- Wing area: 240 sq ft (22.3 m^{2})
- Empty weight: 2,717 lb (1,232 kg)
- Gross weight: 4,016 lb (1,822 kg)
- Powerplant: 1 × Wright XR-1510-26 , 625 hp (466 kW)

Performance

- Maximum speed: 209 mph (336 km/h, 182 kn)
- Range: 1,400 mi (2,253 km, 1,200 nmi)
- Service ceiling: 24,500 ft (7,468 m)

Armament

- 2 × .30 in (7.62 mm) machine guns
- 232 lb (105 kg) bombs
