= Short Shirl =

Shirl
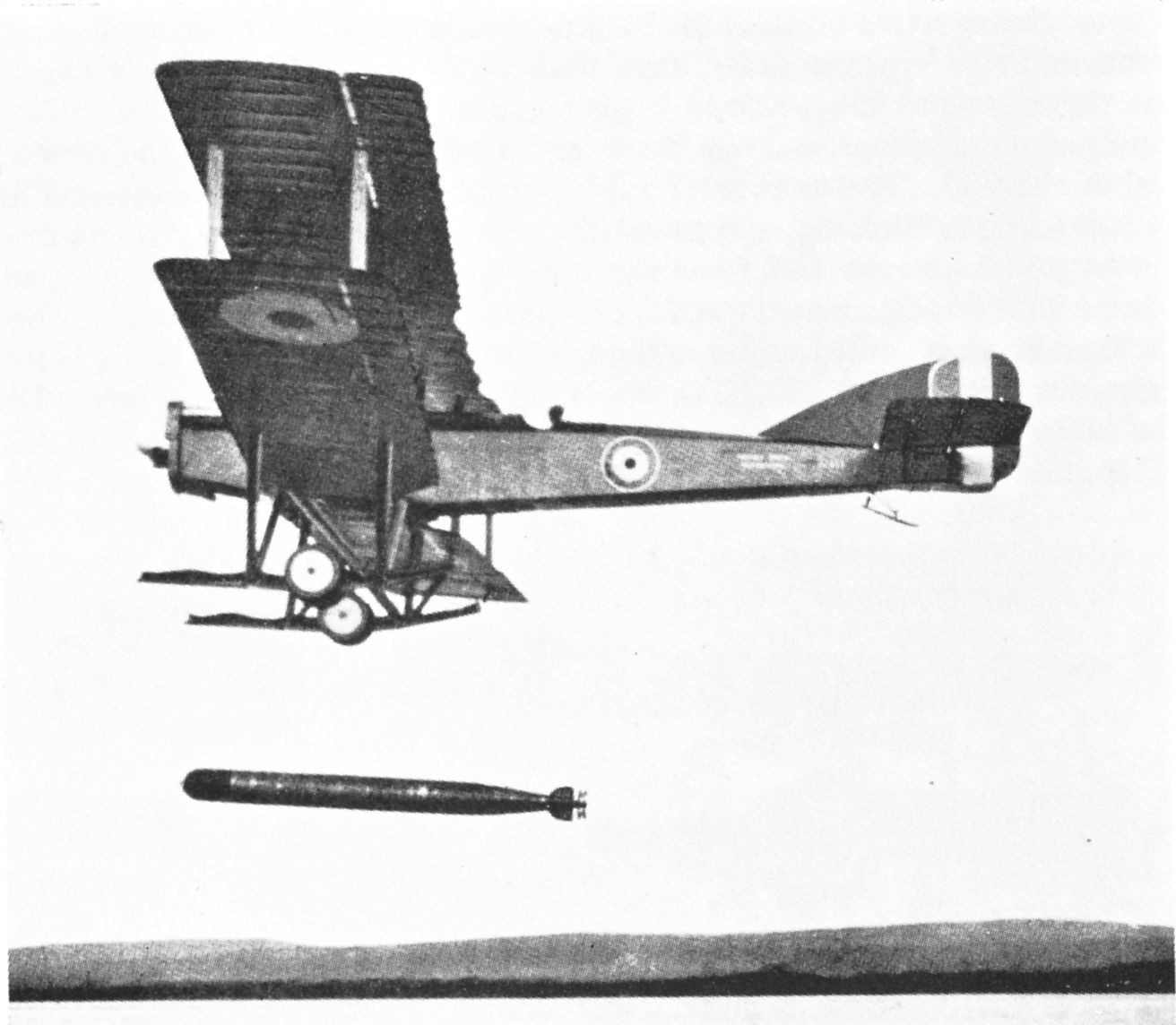
- N111, the second Shirl, drops a torpedo at Dunbar, UK in July 1918

General information
- Type: Shipborne torpedo-bomber
- National origin: United Kingdom
- Manufacturer: Short Brothers
- Number built: 4

History
- First flight: 27 May 1918

The Short N.1B Shirl was a British single-seat biplane, intended to carry heavy torpedoes from early aircraft carriers late in the First World War. It met its specifications but planned production was ended with the Armistice of 1918. The design was developed further for an attempt to cross the Atlantic nonstop for the first time, but this was not successful.

== Development ==
The first shipborne torpedo bomber, the Sopwith Cuckoo had been well received, but was unable to carry the Royal Navy's 1,423 lb (645 kg) Mark VIII torpedo that was required to destroy the largest warships. The Admiralty issued Specification N.1B in late 1917, for an aircraft that could carry this torpedo. Short Brothers and Blackburn submitted proposals, Short's with the Shirl and Blackburn with the Blackburd. Both manufacturers were asked to provide three prototypes, using the 385 hp (287 kW) Rolls-Royce Eagle VIII water-cooled engine.

The Shirl was a two-bay biplane with foldable fabric-covered wings, without stagger and of equal span, carrying two pairs of ailerons. The fuselage was rectangular in cross-section and plywood-covered, in anticipation of ditching at the end of the mission, since deck landing was not yet practicable. The split-axle undercarriage could be jettisoned for the same situation. The engine was cooled with a honeycomb radiator immediately behind a two-blade propeller.

== Operational history ==
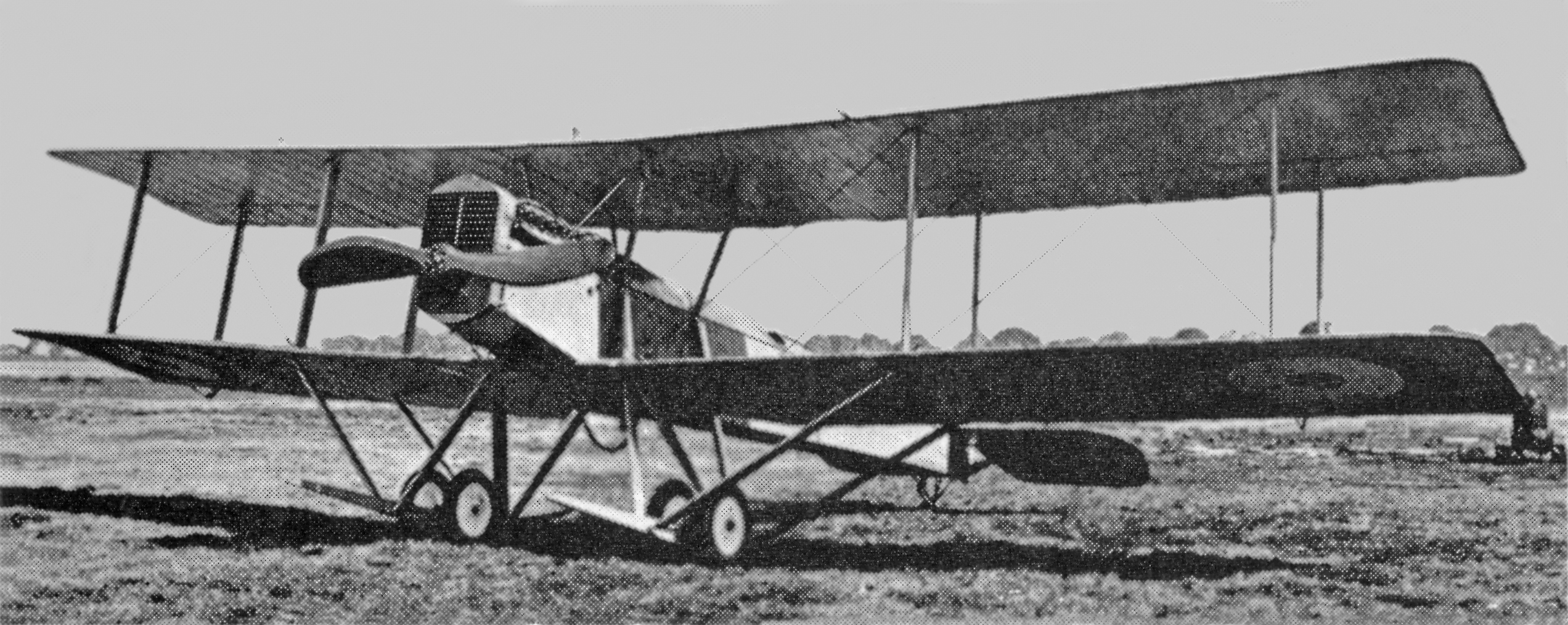
The Short Shirl N111 at the Isle of Grain in July 1918

After initial tests, the first Shirl was given slight sweepback to allow for a shift in the centre of gravity caused by the addition of flotation bags. The undercarriage was also modified: the early single-axle version was jettisoned after takeoff, to allow for torpedo release and ditching, but now, with a split-axle, the torpedo or the undercarriage could be released separately or not at all. The new undercarriage had a pair of skids, each with a pair of wheels. With this arrangement the first aircraft satisfactorily underwent ditching trials in July 1918. This aircraft briefly used a four-bladed propeller, but soon reverted to the original two-bladed airscrew.

The second Shirl had larger ailerons and no tailplane incidence adjustment, which made it hard to trim for flight, with and without the torpedo. The third and final aircraft, delivered in December 1918, regained tailplane adjustment and had a further revised undercarriage. Trials showed that the aircraft could deliver the torpedo, though it lacked the Cuckoo's evasive agility, after the burden of the torpedo was relieved. An order for 100 was placed, and quotations for more invited; but in early 1919 the Navy decided not to go ahead, ordering more Cuckoos instead. The Shirl was regarded as a stable (in civilian life a virtue) aircraft with good fuel economy and weightlifting abilities. Mail-carrying was seen as a possible way of exploiting these characteristics and the third Shirl was fitted with a large plywood container in the torpedo bay. Trial flights were made but no commercial service followed.

== Variants ==
Because of its weightlifting ability and fuel economy, the Shirl was considered the basis for a long-range aircraft to vie for the Daily Mail £10,000 prize for the first heavier-than-air transatlantic flight. For this attempt Short Brothers built a considerably revised Shirl, nicknamed the Shamrock. It had its span increased by 10 ft 2 in (3.10 m) to 62 ft 2 in (18.95 m)with a three-bay wing, giving a wing area of 1,015 sq ft (94.3 m^{2}). Empty weight increased by 662 lb (300 kg) to 3,962 lb (1,797 kg). A second seat, placed staggered side by side for the navigator was provided. A very large tubular fuel tank attached to the torpedo rack increased the total fuel load to 435 imp gal (1,980 L; 522 US gal) which would have given a 3,200 mi (5,100 km) still-air range (or 40 hours at 80 mph (130 km/h). Very surprisingly, an east–west flight was chosen, very much against the prevailing winds and something not achieved until the flight of the Junkers W.33 Bremen in April 1928. The Curragh plain in Ireland was chosen as the departure point, but the Shamrock never reached that far, ditching in the Irish Sea due to engine failure, on the way to Ireland on 18 April 1919. The aircraft was recovered and might have made another attempt, but in July 1919 Alcock and Brown won the prize in the Vickers Vimy, flying west to east.

== Specifications (standard Shirl) ==
Data from Barnes 1989, p. 150

General characteristics

- Crew: one
- Length: 35 ft 0 in (10.66 m)
- Wingspan: 52 ft 0 in (15.85 m)
- Height: 13 ft 3 in (4.04 m) 4.04
- Wing area: 791 sq ft (73.5 m^{2})
- Empty weight: 3,300 lb (1,497 kg)
- Gross weight: 5,950 lb (2,700 kg)
- Powerplant: 1 × Rolls-Royce Eagle VIII V-12 cylinder water-cooled engine, 385 hp (288 kW)

Performance

- Maximum speed: 92 mph (148 km/h, 80 kn)
- Endurance: 6.5 hours
- Service ceiling: 10,010 ft (3,050 m)

Armament

- 1 × 1,423 lb (645 kg) 18 inch Mark VIII torpedo

== The name ==
Shirl is not a common English word and the Oxford English Dictionary gives four meanings. Two meanings, "shrill" and "rough", regarding hair are very old and seem to have fallen out of use in Elizabethan times. Two usages remained extant at the beginning of the 20th century: "a trimming" (of hair, wool etc.) and a "slide on ice". Both are given as dialect, though the first was not always so. The second is a northern usage. Either might perhaps describe a torpedo attack; the Short family was from the north of England.

== See also ==
Aircraft of comparable role, configuration, and era

- Blackburn Blackburd
