= Grumman G-118 =

Proposed American interceptor

G-118

General information
- Type: Fighter aircraft
- Manufacturer: Grumman
- Status: Not built
- Primary user: United States Navy (intended)

The Grumman G-118 (sometimes called the XF12F, though this was never official) was a design for an all-weather missile-armed interceptor aircraft for use on US Navy aircraft carriers. Originally conceived as an uprated F11F Tiger, it soon evolved into a larger and more powerful project. Although two prototypes were ordered in 1955, development was cancelled the same year in favor of the F4H Phantom II before any examples were built. Grumman's next (and last) carrier fighter would be the F-14 Tomcat, ordered in 1968.

== Design ==
The Grumman Design 118 was a two-seat, twin-engined, rocket augmented, carrier-based all-weather supersonic fighter aircraft. It had a 45° swept wing, a "T-tail" empennage, two small folding ventral fins, and a landing gear of tricycle configuration. For ejection, the tandem crew were encapsulated and ejected downwards. It also featured a boundary layer control system to improve low speed handling.

The G-118 was to be powered by two J79-GE-3 engines, with accommodations for the more powerful J79-GE-207 engines each producing 18,000 lbf of afterburning thrust. Similar to the contemporary Vought XF8U-3 Crusader III, it was designed with an additional throttleable liquid-fueled rocket engine using a mixture of JP-4 fuel and hydrogen peroxide oxidizer which produced 5,000 lbf of thrust.

Armament stores would have been under the fuselage in two semi-recessed hardpoints for the AIM-7 Sparrow air-to-air missile and an internal weapons bay for an additional AIM-7 or three AIM-9 Sidewinder missiles.

== Specifications (G-118, as designed) ==
Data from and Standard Aircraft Characteristics

General characteristics

- Crew: 2
- Length: 57 ft 7 in (17.55 m)
- Wingspan: 43 ft 11.69 in (13.4033 m)
- Height: 14 ft 10 in (4.52 m)
- Wing area: 595 sq ft (55.3 m^{2})
- Empty weight: 26,355 lb (11,954 kg)
- Gross weight: 37,366 lb (16,949 kg)
- Max takeoff weight: 51,216 lb (23,231 kg)
- Powerplant: 2 × J79-GE-3 after-burning turbojet engines, 10,000 lbf (44 kN) thrust each dry, 15,600 lbf (69 kN) with afterburner
- Powerplant: 1 × throttleable rocket engine, 5,000 lbf (22 kN) thrust

Performance

- Maximum speed: Mach 2
- Range: 1,352 nmi (1,556 mi, 2,504 km)
- Service ceiling: 60,000 ft (18,288 m)
- Wing loading: 62.8 lb/sq ft (307 kg/m^{2})

Armament

- Rockets: 2 x AIR-2 Genie unguided nuclear rockets or
- Missiles:
  - 3 × AIM-7 Sparrow III missiles
    or
  - 2 × AIM-7 Sparrow and
  - 3 × AIM-9 Sidewinder

== See also ==
Related development

- Grumman F-11 Tiger

Aircraft of comparable role, configuration, and era

- McDonnell Douglas F-4 Phantom II
- Vought XF8U-3 Crusader III

Related lists

- List of fighter aircraft
- List of military aircraft of the United States
