= Vought O4U Corsair =

O4U Corsair
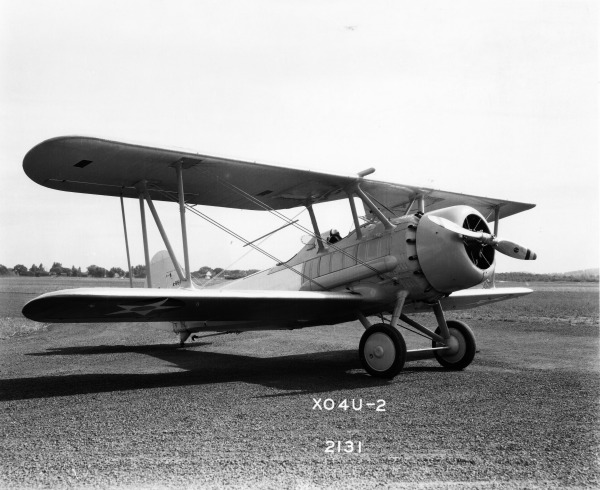

General information
- Type: Observation
- National origin: United States
- Manufacturer: Vought Corporation
- Number built: 1 each

History
- First flight: XO4U-1:February 1931, XO4U-2:1932

The Vought O4U Corsair was the designation applied to two different experimental biplane scout-observation aircraft. Neither reached production or entered regular service.

== Design and development ==
Ordered by the United States Navy in 1930 as the third type of "lightweight" observation aircraft designs, along with the Keystone XOK-1 and the Berliner-Joyce XOJ-1, both of which were built to BuAer Design No. 86, the XO4U-1 was completed to a somewhat different specification.

The Vought XO4U-1, BuNo A-8641, was built in 1931, and was Vought's first airplane with a deep monocoque two-place fuselage, and had a metal and fabric-covered metal wing structure. Both sets of wings joined the fuselage ahead of the pair of cockpits with the pilot seated in a cut out on the trailing edge of the shoulder-mounted slightly-swept upper wing. Photos show the airframe in the factory, fitted with teardrop-shaped wheel pants, but exterior pictures taken during its brief existence do not show these installed. Powered by a 500 hp (370 kW) Pratt & Whitney R-1340D Wasp 9-cylinder air-cooled radial engine driving a two-bladed fixed-pitch propeller. Although designed to serve either as a landplane or on floats, floats had not been fitted before the prototype was destroyed.

After the crash of the XO4U-1, Vought produced a new airframe which was designated the XO4U-2, and assigned the same serial carried by the XO4U-1, A-8641, although several lists of U.S. Navy aircraft serials make no mention of the second design, or the reuse of the Bureau of Aeronautics number. (The same practice was applied to the three Grumman XF3F-1 prototypes, two of which crashed, with all three carrying the same serial number.) This was actually an O3U-3 Corsair featuring that model's rounded fin and rudder, an all-metal wing structure, and was fitted with a cowled Pratt & Whitney R-1535 Twin Wasp Junior, and first flew in June 1932. Aviation historian William T. Larkins observes that under the designation system the XO4U-2 should have been a minor modification of the XO4U-1.

== Operational history ==
The sole XO4U-1 first flew in February 1931, but crashed on 28 February 1931, when test pilot Carl Harper was unable to recover from a spin. Initially trapped in the cockpit by the inertia of the spin, he escaped to parachute safely as the airframe came down. The airframe was never delivered to the Navy.

The XO4U-2 was sent to the National Advisory Committee for Aeronautics for testing in the 30' X 60' Full Scale Tunnel at Langley Memorial Aeronautical Laboratory at Langley Field, Virginia, in April and May 1933, where it was "flown" under controlled conditions. Part of these tests were to evaluate the cooling of the Pratt & Whitney Twin Wasp radial engine, while others dealt with the relation of the slipstream to stability and control.

The XO4U-2 was still listed in Status of Naval Aircraft as on strength at the Naval Aircraft Factory, Philadelphia, Pennsylvania, as of June 1937.

== Variants ==
XO4U-1
Prototype light observation scout
XO4U-2
A second prototype of different design but carrying the same serial number as the XO4U-1.

== Specifications (XO4U-1) ==
Data from Eckland, K.O. (25 April 2009). "Aerofiles Vought (Chance Vought), Lewis & Vought, Vought-Sikorsky". Aerofiles.com. USA.

General characteristics

- Crew: 2
- Length: 27 ft 9 in (8.46 m)
- Wingspan: 37 ft 0 in (11.28 m)
- Powerplant: 1 × Pratt & Whitney R-1340D Wasp 9-cylinder air-cooled radial engine, 500 hp (370 kW)

Performance

- Maximum speed: 143 mph (230 km/h, 124 kn)
- Service ceiling: 21,200 ft (6,500 m)
