= Beardmore W.B.IV =

W.B.IV

General information
- Type: Fighter
- National origin: United Kingdom
- Manufacturer: Beardmore
- Designer: G. Tilghman Richards
- Status: Prototype
- Number built: 1

History
- First flight: 1917

The Beardmore W.B.IV was a British single-engine biplane ship-based fighter of World War I developed by Beardmore. Only one was built.

== Development and design ==
The W.B.IV was designed to meet Admiralty Specification N.1A for a naval land- or ship-based fighter aircraft. The design was dominated by the demands for the aircraft to be able to be safely ditching and remain afloat. A large permanent flotation chamber was built into the fuselage under the nose and the pilot was in a watertight cockpit. The propeller shaft ran underneath the cockpit from the Hispano-Suiza V-8 engine which was over the centre of gravity of the aircraft. The entire undercarriage could be released from the plane for water landings. The wing tips were fitted with additional floats, while the aircraft's two-bay wings could fold for storage on board ship.

The single prototype first flew at Beardmore's Dalmuir factory on 12 December 1917, being delivered for evaluation at Martlesham Heath in July 1918. The W.B.IV had poorer performance than the much simpler and smaller shipborne version of the Sopwith Camel and was not developed further. The sole prototype was lost when it sank during ditching.

== Specifications ==
Data from Jane's Fighting Aircraft of World War I

General characteristics

- Crew: 1
- Length: 26 ft 6 in (8.08 m)
- Wingspan: 35 ft 10 in (10.92 m)
- Height: 9 ft 10.5 in (3.010 m)
- Wing area: 350 sq ft (33 m^{2})
- Empty weight: 1,960 lb (889 kg)
- Gross weight: 2,600 lb (1,179 kg)
- Powerplant: 1 × Hispano-Suiza 8B V-8 water-cooled piston engine, 200 hp (150 kW)
- Propellers: 2-bladed fixed-pitch propeller

Performance

- Maximum speed: 110 mph (180 km/h, 96 kn)
- Endurance: 2 hours 30 minutes
- Service ceiling: 14,000 ft (4,300 m)

Armament

- Guns: 1x synchronized .303 in Vickers machine gun and one Lewis gun on tripod mounting

== Bibliography ==
- Bruce, J.M. (1965). War Planes of the First World War: Volume 1 Fighters. London: Macdonald.
- Mason, Francis K (1992). The British Fighter since 1912. Annapolis, Maryland US: Naval Institute Press. ISBN 1-55750-082-7.
- Owers, Colin (2023). Beardmore Aircraft of WWI: A Centennial Perspective on Great War Airplanes. Great War Aviation Centennial Series. Vol. 69. n.p.: Aeronaut Books. ISBN 978-1-953201-69-0.
- Taylor, Michael J. H. (1990). Jane's Fighting Aircraft of World War I. London: Studio Editions. p. 57.
