= Berliner-Joyce P-16 =

1932 fighter aircraft family by Berliner-Joyce

P-16
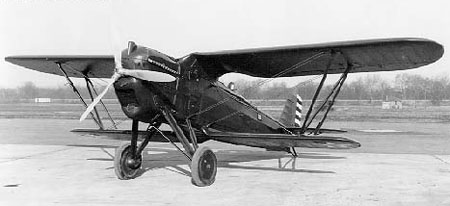

General information
- Type: Two-seat fighter
- Manufacturer: Berliner-Joyce Aircraft Corporation
- Primary user: United States Army Air Corps
- Number built: 26

History
- Introduction date: 1932
- First flight: 1 September 1930
- Retired: 1940

The Berliner-Joyce P-16 was a 1930s United States two-seat fighter aircraft produced by Berliner-Joyce Aircraft Corporation.

== Design and development ==
The Berliner-Joyce Aircraft Corporation was established in February 1929 when it acquired the assets of the Berliner Aircraft Company. The new company had intended to develop the Berliner Monoplane but became involved in designing a two-seat fighter for the United States Army Air Corps. The prototype, designated the Berliner-Joyce XP-16 first flew in October 1929 (at this time in the United States, fighter aircraft were known as "pursuit planes" and were designated with a "P"; the "X" stands for "experimental"). It had a metal structure with a fabric covering. It was a single-bay biplane of unequal span ("sesquiplane"), with the wings forward-staggered. The lower wing was smaller than the upper, was mounted at the base of the fuselage, and unusually, was of reverse-gullwing type, while the upper wing was of gull wing configuration. An observer/gunner was located behind the pilot. The aircraft was powered by a 600 hp (447 kW) Curtiss V-1570 Conqueror supercharged V-12 inline engine. After evaluation by the USAAC, two contracts were awarded for a total of 25 aircraft as YP-16s (the first 15 were considered preproduction, which were given a "Y" designation). The main difference with the production aircraft was the use of an unsupercharged version of the Conqueror engine and a three-bladed propeller.

== Operational history ==
During 1931, the USAAC ordered the Berliner-Joyce YP-16, which had the distinction of being the last biplane fighter to enter service with the USAAC. In addition, the P-16 remained the only two-seat biplane fighter to be produced for the army after 1918.

Delivered in 1932 as the Y1P-16 primarily equipping the 94th Pursuit Squadron, the production aircraft were later re-designated PB-1 (pursuit-biplace, an awkward designation for a class of aircraft and only applied to one other type, the Consolidated P-30, later re-designated PB-2 and PB-2A. Without the prototype's supercharger, performance at altitude was appreciably reduced, although the aircraft had a greater endurance than contemporary single-seat pursuits. Despite the gull-wing, pilots had poor visibility over the nose, which contributed to service pilots having a propensity to nose-over on landing.

All Berliner-Joyce PB-1s were withdrawn from active service in 1934, although a small number of aircraft continued in second-line duties until 1940.

== Variants ==
XP-16
Prototype with 600 hp Curtiss V-1570-25 engine, one built.
Y1P-16
Production version, became P-16 after evaluation, 25 built.
P-16
In-service designation of the 25 production aircraft, re-designated PB-1 in 1935.
PB-1
Production aircraft re-designated from P-16 in 1935.

== Operators ==
United States

- United States Army Air Corps

== Specifications (P-16) ==
General characteristics

- Crew: 2
- Length: 28 ft 2 in (8.59 m)
- Wingspan: 34 ft 0 in (10.36 m)
- Height: 10 ft 2 in (3.10 m)
- Wing area: 290.64 sq ft (27 m^{2})
- Empty weight: 2,734 lb (1,240 kg)
- Max takeoff weight: 3,968 lb (1,800 kg)
- Powerplant: 1 × Curtiss V-1570-25 Conqueror inline piston, 600 hp (447 kW)

Performance

- Maximum speed: 172 mph (282 km/h, 149 kn)
- Range: 650 mi (1,046 km, 560 nmi)

Armament
two fixed forward-firing and one flexible-mounted 0.3 in (7.62 mm) machine guns, maximum bombload of 224 lb (102 kg)
