= Heinkel HD 23 =

HD 23, Type H
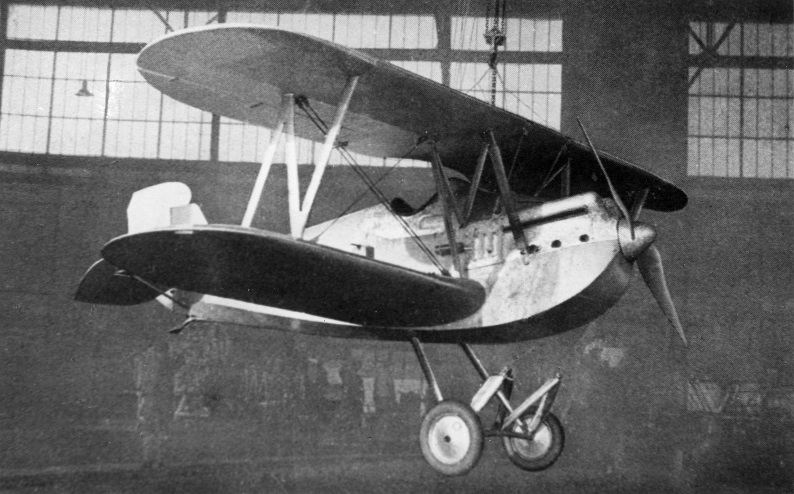

General information
- Type: Carrier-based fighter
- National origin: Germany
- Manufacturer: Heinkel, Aichi
- Number built: 4

History
- First flight: 1926

The Heinkel HD 23 was a carrier-borne fighter biplane designed in Germany at Heinkel Flugzeugwerke in the 1920s for export to Japan. Two examples were delivered to Aichi as pattern aircraft in 1927. Aichi added rudimentary flotation capability and built two further examples as the Type H Carrier Fighter, but full-scale production was not started.

== Specifications (HD 23a) ==
General characteristics

- Crew: One pilot
- Length: 7.55 m (24 ft 9 in)
- Wingspan: 10.80 m (35 ft 5 in)
- Height: 3.79 m (12 ft 5 in)
- Wing area: 36.0 m^{2} (388 sq ft)
- Empty weight: 1,470 kg (3,240 lb)
- Gross weight: 2,070 kg (4,560 lb)
- Powerplant: 1 × BMW VI , 447 kW (600 hp)

Performance

- Maximum speed: 250 km/h (160 mph, 140 kn)
- Service ceiling: 7,900 m (25,900 ft)
