= Grumman Duck =

Grumman Duck may refer to:

- Grumman JF Duck, a single-engine amphibious biplane
- Grumman J2F Duck, an improved version of the earlier JF Duck
