= Charles Lane Poor =

American astronomer

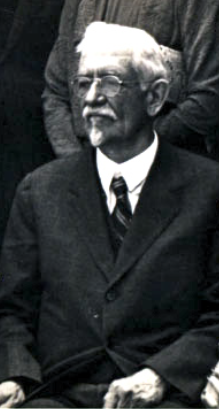
- Born: January 18, 1866; Hackensack, New Jersey
- Died: September 27, 1951 (aged 85)
- Citizenship: American
- Education: City College of New York; Johns Hopkins University
- Scientific career
- Fields: Astronomy
- Workplaces: Columbia University
- Doctoral advisor: Simon Newcomb

Charles Lane Poor (January 18, 1866 – September 27, 1951) was an American astronomy professor, noted for his opposition to Einstein's theory of relativity.

== Biography ==
He was born on January 18, 1866, in Hackensack, New Jersey, to Edward Erie Poor.

He graduated from the City College of New York and received a PhD in 1892 from Johns Hopkins University. Poor became an astronomer and professor of celestial mechanics at Columbia University from 1903 to 1944, when he was named Professor Emeritus. He published several works disputing the evidence for Einstein's theory of relativity during the 1920s, and reflecting objections to the theory.

For 25 years, Poor was chairman of the admissions committee of the New York Yacht Club. In addition, he was a fellow of the Royal Astronomical Society and an associate fellow of the American Academy of Arts and Sciences. He served several terms as mayor of Dering Harbor on Long Island, New York. Poor also invented a circular slide rule used with a sextant for yachting navigation. At Columbia University, Poor was a teacher of the astronomer Samuel A. Mitchell, who went on to become director of the Leander McCormick Observatory at the University of Virginia.

He died on September 27, 1951.

== Legacy ==
One of Poor's sons, Edmund Ward Poor, was one of ten co-founders of Grumman Aircraft on Long Island. Another son was Alfred Easton Poor, an architect.

== Selected publications ==
- The Solar System: A Study of Recent Observations (1908)
- Nautical Science (1910)
- Gravitation versus Relativity (with a preliminary essay by Thomas Chrowder Chamberlin, 1922)
- Is Einstein Wrong? A Debate (Jun. 1924)
- Rebuttal to Prof. Henderson's Article (Aug. 1924)
- The Relativity Deflection of Light (Jul. 1927)
- Relativity and the Law of Gravitation (Jan. 1930)
- The Deflection of Light as Observed at Total Solar Eclipses (Apr. 1930)
- What Einstein Really Did (Nov. 1930)

== See also ==
- Criticism of relativity theory
