= G63 =

G63 may refer to:

- Bena language, a Bantu language of Tanzania
- Grumman G-63 Kitten I, an American experimental aircraft
- HMCS Haida (G63), a Royal Canadian Navy Tribal-class destroyer
- HMS Gurkha (G63), a Royal Navy L-class destroyer
- Mercedes-Benz G63 AMG 6x6, a limited production AMG version of G-Class with six wheels
