= Columbia Field =

Former airport near Valley Stream, New York, U.S.

Columbia Field Curtiss Field
- IATA: none; ICAO: none

Summary
- Serves: Valley Stream, New York
- Built: 1929
- In use: Rogers Field 1928-1929, Curtiss Field (public) 1929-1933, Columbia Field (private) 1933-1947.
- Occupants: Advance Aircraft Corporation, Curtiss-Wright, Grumman, Columbia Aircraft Corporation, Commonwealth Aircraft
- Coordinates: 40°40′00″N 73°43′00″W

Map
- Columbia Field, New York Columbia Field (Long Island)

Columbia Field, originally Curtiss Field, is a former airfield near Valley Stream within the Town of Hempstead on Long Island, New York. Between 1929 and 1933 it was a public airfield named Curtiss Field after the Curtiss-Wright aircraft corporation that owned it. The public airfield closed after 1933, but aircraft continued to be manufactured there primarily by Columbia Aircraft Corporation, which gave the private airfield its name.

During its five years of operation, Curtiss Field was one of the busiest airports on Long Island. The airfield was popular with many of the famous pilots of the early days of aviation including Charles Lindbergh, Amelia Earhart, and Frank Hawks. Several important long-distance aviation records or events were marked at the airfield. In 1929 the women's aviation group the Ninety Nines was founded at the airfield, and large airshows were often held there.

After 1933 the airfield was the site of aviation manufacturing by Columbia Aircraft and Grumman. During World War II Columbia manufactured the Grumman-designed J2F-6 Duck, a single-engine amphibious biplane, under contract. The airfield was finally abandoned in 1947. The Town of Hempstead gave formal recognition to the historical importance of Curtiss Field in 2009.

== History ==
In 1928 Rogers Airport, or Advance Sunrise Airport, opened on the future site of Columbia Field on land leased from the Reisert Farm near Valley Stream on Long Island, New York. Francis Rogers was the president of Advance Aircraft Corporation. The airport was only a year old when the Curtiss-Wright Corporation purchased the airport and the land and invested a few million dollars to develop the airfield. Opened in April 1929 and renamed Curtiss Field, the public airfield consisted of 2 asphalt runways of 2850' length in a triangular layout. Charles Lindbergh contributed to its design. Curtiss-Wright moved their commercial airport and school for pilots and mechanics from nearby Mineola to the new facilities at Curtiss Field, including six hangars and a flight school.

The new airfield quickly became busy, used by many of the famous aviators of the era, including Jimmy Doolittle, Amelia Earhart, Lindbergh, Elinor Smith, Frank Hawks and Wiley Post. Several aviation records were set at the airfield. Curtiss Field was the largest commercial airport on Long Island for 3 years starting in 1930. From 1930 the Naval Reserve Aviation Base Valley Stream was located at Curtiss Field.

Air shows were frequent events at the airfield, featuring stunt flying, parachute jumpers, wing walking and aerial tricks. Large crowds of 1,000 to 10,000 people attended; income from such shows gave important financial support to the often-poor pilots.

With the onset of the economic downturn of the Great Depression, the airfield closed in 1933 after only five years of operation. Columbia Aircraft Corporation continued the airfield privately from 1933 to 1946, renaming the airfield Columbia Field.

During World War II, the Grumman Aircraft Company contracted Columbia Aircraft to build the J2F Duck floatplane. Columbia built the planes at Columbia Field from early 1942 until the end of the war. In 1946, Commonwealth Aircraft bought out Columbia Aircraft, but then went bankrupt the following year. Columbia Field was then abandoned.

A decade after closing, Green Acres Mall, one of the first malls on Long Island, was built on the north side of the former airport property. Several of the former hangars were spared and remain standing.

Other nearby airports on Long Island were also known as "Curtiss" Airport in the late 1920s and 1930s, including Glenn H. Curtiss Airport, which is now New York City's La Guardia Airport, and Curtiss Field at Mineola, which was part of Roosevelt Field.

== Events ==
In September 1929 Jimmy Doolittle demonstrated "blind flying", or using only aircraft instrumentation to fly and land an airplane. Before this demonstration flight at nearby Mitchel Field, he practiced the technique at Curtiss Field.

On November 1, 1929, about 10,000 people welcomed “The Land of the Soviets,” a twin-engine Tupolev monoplane, arriving from Moscow. The plane had left Moscow on August 23, flying eastward across Siberia, the Pacific Ocean, and North America to Curtiss Field, a distance of 13,000 miles (21,000 km) in 141 hours of flying time over 2 1/2 months.

The next day, 26 licensed female pilots, led by Amelia Earhart, met at Curtiss Field to found the Ninety-Nines, an organization for the mutual support and advancement of women pilots. At the suggestion of Earhart, the new organization's name was taken from the number of charter members, eventually settling on Ninety-Nines. The organization still actively supports women pilots.

On August 13, 1930, Frank Hawks set a new transcontinental speed record, flying from Los Angeles, California to Curtiss Field in 12 hours, 25 minutes, 3 seconds. The flight broke the record by Charles Lindbergh by more than 2 hours.

Also in 1930, French fliers Dieudonné Costes and Maurice Bellonte made the most difficult non-stop trans-Atlantic flight, from east to west, Paris to Curtiss Field. Some 25,000 people watched their red Breguet Br.19 TF Super Bidon biplane land at Curtis Field on September 2 after flying 3,674 miles (5,913 km) in 37 hours and 18 minutes.

In 1931 Grumman, then a new aircraft manufacturer, developed their XFF-1 prototype fighter aircraft at Curtiss Field. Needing more space to construct the aircraft, Grumman rented a vacant Naval Reserve hangar at Curtiss Field, moving in on November 4, 1931. The biplane made its first test flight on December 29, 1931. The airplane, Grumman's first aircraft project, was the US Navy's first aircraft with an air-cooled radial engine, enclosed cockpits, and fully retractable landing gear.

On October 9, 1932, pilot James H. Banning and mechanic Thomas C. Allen touched down at Curtiss Field, becoming the first black pilots to make a transcontinental flight. Departing Los Angeles on September 18, 1932, at the height of the Great Depression, the flight took a total of 41 hours and 27 minutes over a span of 21 days. The two airmen, who called themselves "The Flying Hoboes", left Los Angeles with a total of $25 in a rickety airplane of surplus parts and a sputtering 14-year old Curtiss engine.

== Historical Landmark status ==
In 2009, the 80th anniversary of the founding of the airfield, the historical importance of the site was recognized by the Town of Hempstead’s Landmarks Preservation Committee. Valley Stream is a village within the Town of Hempstead, which covers almost a third of Nassau County. A historical marker honoring the aviation history made in Valley Stream was installed on the site of the airport's hangars, now occupied by the Green Acres Mall. Historical research supporting the recognition demonstrated the importance of the Airfield not only to Valley Stream, but also to the history of aviation and the legends of aviation who flew there.

A similar marker noting the founding of the Ninety-Nines was placed at the same location on November 2, 1979, the 50th anniversary of the event. The marker is now at the Cradle of Aviation Museum in Garden City, Long Island.

== See also ==
- Mitchel Air Force Base
- Roosevelt Field (airport)
- Curtis Field An airfield in Texas
