= Nikitin NV-4 =

General information
- Type: Amphibious aircraft
- National origin: USSR
- Designer: Vasilii Vasilyevich Nikitin
- Number built: 1

History
- First flight: 1936

The Nikitin NV-4 was a two-seat amphibious aircraft produced in the USSR in 1936.

== Development ==
The tandem seat NV-4 with, enclosed cockpit, was a biplane with a central float integrated with the fuselage, in similar fashion to the Grumman J2F Duck. Constructed mainly of wood the wings were conventional in construction, with ribs built up over spars covered with plywood and fabric. The fuselage and integral tail unit were constructed from shpon (layers of birch ply glued over moulds and templates). A manually retractable undercarriage was housed either side of the central float, with the fixed steerable tailwheel doubling as a water-rudder. Flight testing began, piloted by Nikitin, but pressure of other work caused abandonment.

== Specifications (NV-4) ==
Data from Gunston, Bill. "Encyclopedia of Russian Aircraft 1875-1995". London:Osprey. 1995. ISBN 1-85532-405-9

General characteristics

- Crew: 2
- Length: 8.7 m (28 ft 6.5 in)
- Wingspan: 10.5 m (34 ft 5.33 in)
- Wing area: 28.5 m^{2} (307 sq ft)
- Empty weight: 825 kg (1,819 lb)
- Gross weight: 1,090 kg (2,403 lb)
- Powerplant: 1 × M-11 , 74.57 kW (100 hp)

Performance

- Maximum speed: 160 km/h (99.5 mph, 86.5 kn)
- Endurance: 4 hours
- Service ceiling: 3,500 m (11,500 ft)

== See also ==
Aircraft of comparable role, configuration, and era

- Grumman J2F Duck

Related lists

- List of aircraft
