= Columbia Aircraft Corporation =

American aircraft manufacturer

- Industry: Aerospace
- Founded: 1927
- Founders: Giuseppe Mario Bellanca; Charles A. Levine
- Defunct: 1946
- Fate: Acquired by Commonwealth Aircraft
- Headquarters: Hempstead, New York, United States

The Columbia Aircraft Corporation was an American aircraft manufacturer, which was active between 1927 and 1947.

== History ==
Columbia Aircraft was founded in December 1927 by Charles A. Levine as chairman and the aircraft designer Giuseppe Mario Bellanca as president. The initial name used was Columbia Air Liners, Inc. The aircraft factory was established at Hempstead, New York. Levine hired pilots Bert Acosta, Eroll Boyd, John Wycliff Isemann, Burr Leyson, and Roger Q. Williams at $200 a week to perform a series of publicity record attempts for the company.

The most ambitious project for the company was the "Uncle Sam". Main participant were John Carisi as motor expert, Edmond Chagniard, French designer and airplane constructor, and Alexander Kartveli as technical engineer from Georgia. The $250,000 prototype was brought to market at the height of the depression. It was sold at auction for $3,000 to pay back hangar rent. The "Uncle Sam" and two other Triads were destroyed shortly afterward in a Roosevelt Field hangar fire where 20 other aircraft were spared.

By 1941, the firm's title was Columbia Aircraft Corporation and the factory was located at Columbia Field near Valley Stream, Long Island.

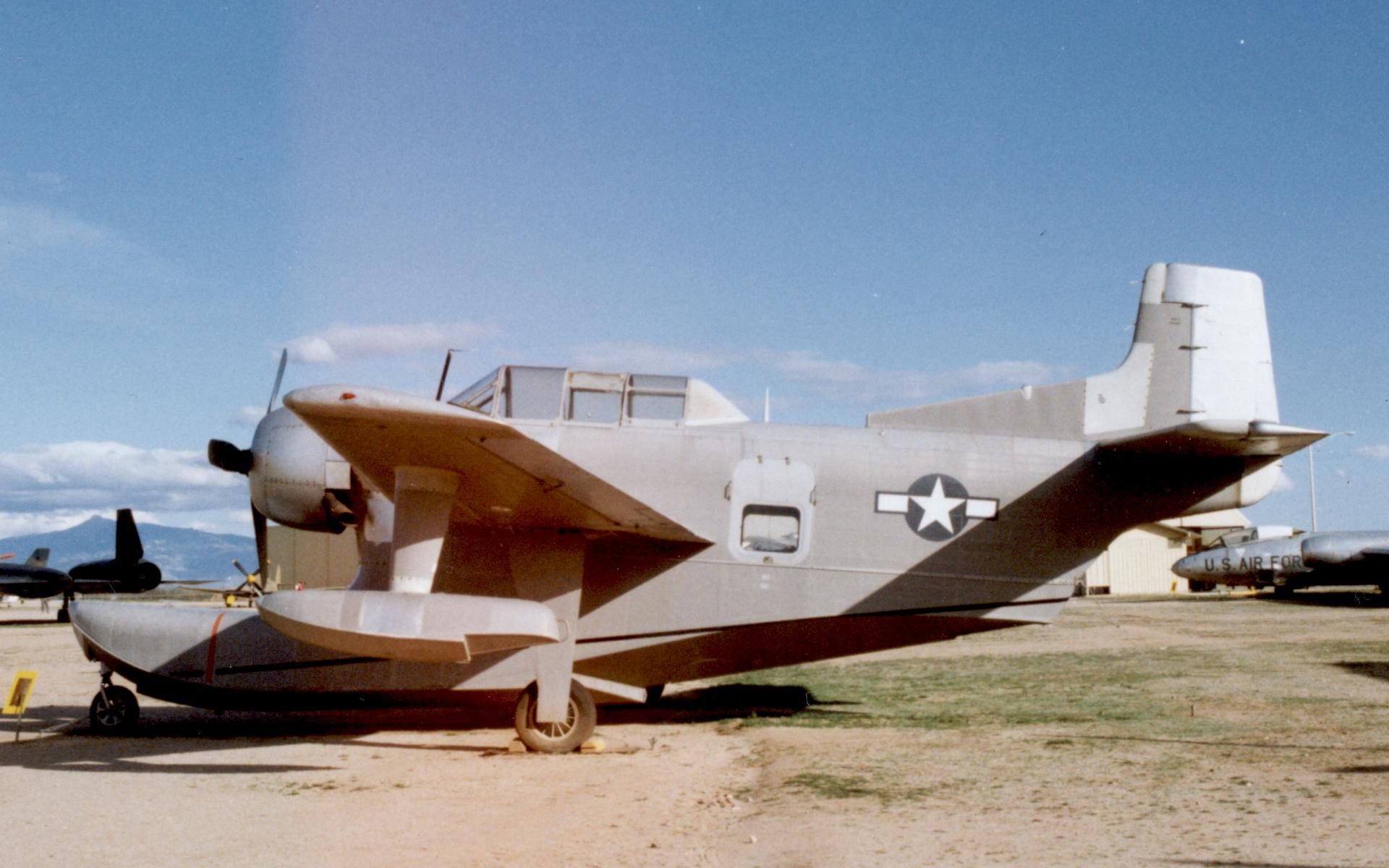
The third Columbia XJL-1 on display at the Pima Air Museum near Tucson, Arizona, in February 1993

From 1941, Columbia worked closely with Grumman Aircraft, undertaking the development and production of that company's military amphibian aircraft designs including the J2F Duck and the Columbia JL. The chief test pilot for the amphibians was noted aviator Lieutenant Johnny Miller.

After the completion of wartime contracts for the United States Navy, the firm's operations reduced in scale and Columbia was acquired by Commonwealth Aircraft in 1946. In 1956, the Green Acres Mall was built at the location of Columbia Field.

== Aircraft ==
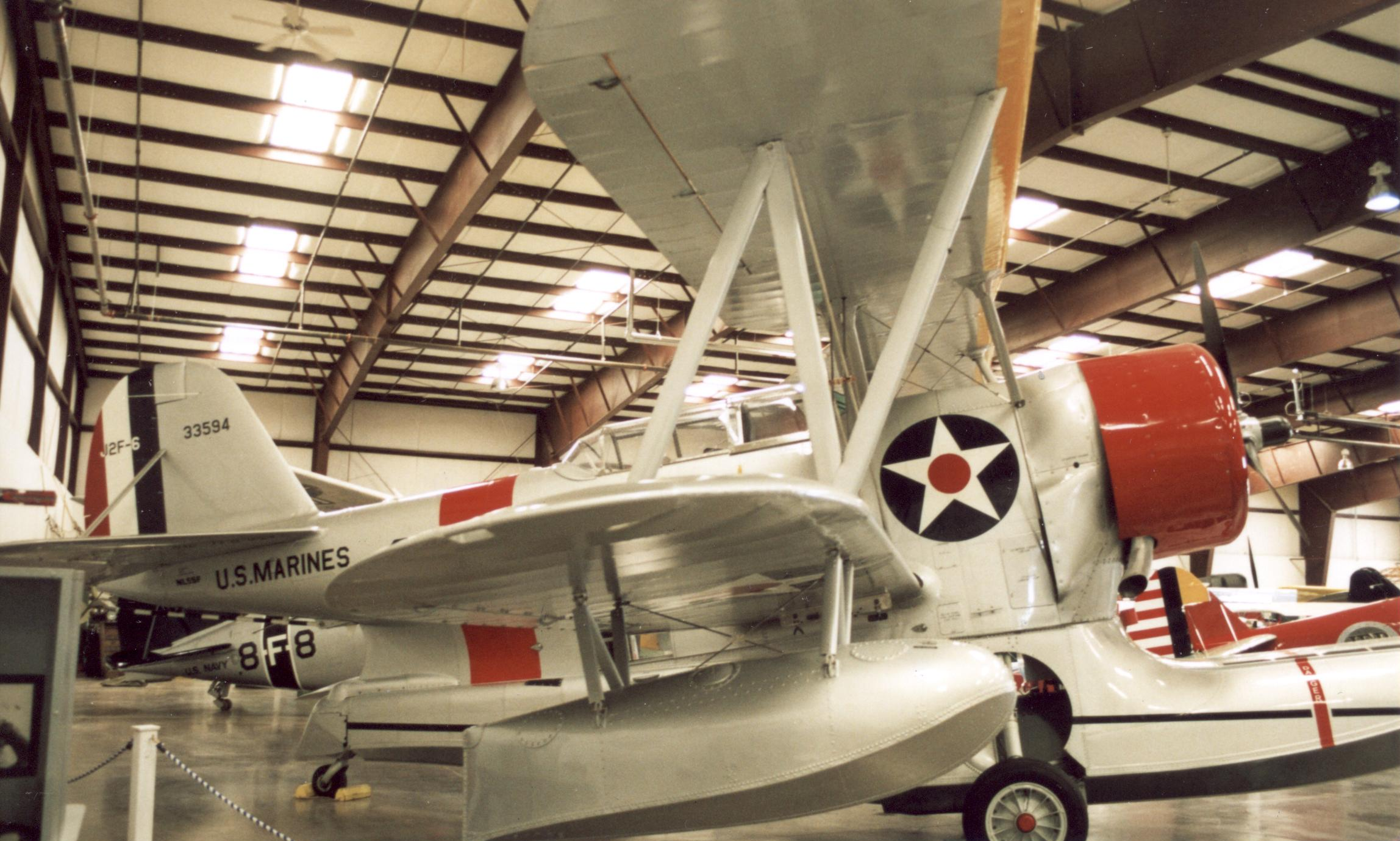
A Columbia-built Grumman J2F Duck displayed at Valle, Arizona, in October 2005

| Model name | First flight | Number built | Type |
|---|---|---|---|
| Columbia CAL-1 Triad | | 2 | Single engine monoplane seaplane |
| Columbia Uncle Sam | 1929 | 1 | Single engine monoplane transport |
| Columbia J2F-6 Duck | 1943 | 330 | Single engine monoplane floatplane scout plane |
| Columbia JL | | 3 | Single engine monoplane floatplane scout plane |
