= Aeronca 12 Chum =

American light aircraft

12AC Chum

General information
- Type: Two-seat touring aircraft and trainer
- National origin: United States
- Manufacturer: Aeronca
- Number built: 2

The Aeronca 12AC Chum was a 2-seat cabin monoplane designed and produced by Aeronca in the United States in 1946. The design was a licence-built version of the ERCO Ercoupe.

Aeronca built two examples, the first with the standard twin tail and a second with a single tail, modified landing gear and all-metal wings.

== Development ==
Aeronca obtained a licence to build the ERCO Ercoupe in 1946 and built two prototypes as the 12AC Chum. The first, registered NX39637, retained the Ercoupe's twin tail; the second, NX83772, had a larger single tail, knee-action main landing gear and all-metal wings. Aerofiles lists the 12AC as powered by a 75 or 85 hp Continental engine, and as approved on the Ercoupe's approved type certificate (ATC 787).

== Specifications (Chum) ==
Data from Jane's all the World's Aircraft 1947

General characteristics

- Crew: 2
- Length: 20 ft (6.1 m)
- Wingspan: 28 ft (8.5 m)
- Height: 8 ft (2.4 m)
- Wing area: 140 sq ft (13 m^{2})
- Empty weight: 860 lb (390 kg)
- Gross weight: 1,400 lb (635 kg)
- Fuel capacity: 22 US gal (18 imp gal; 83 L)
- Powerplant: 1 × Continental C85J 4-cyl. horizontally-opposed air-cooled piston engine, 85 hp (63 kW)
- Propellers: 2-bladed Sensenich fixed pitch wooden propeller

Performance

- Maximum speed: 118 mph (190 km/h, 103 kn)
- Cruise speed: 108 mph (174 km/h, 94 kn) * Landing speed: 49 mph (43 kn; 79 km/h)
- Range: 250 mi (400 km, 220 nmi)
- Service ceiling: 11,000 ft (3,400 m)
- Rate of climb: 610 ft/min (3.1 m/s)
- Wing loading: 10 lb/sq ft (49 kg/m^{2})
- Fuel consumption: 0.469 lb/mi (0.1322 kg/km)
- Power/mass: 16.47 lb/hp (10.04 kg/kW)

== See also ==
Related development

- ERCO Ercoupe

Aircraft of comparable role, configuration, and era

- Grumman Kitten
