= Edmund Ward Poor =

American businessman (1904–1966)

- Born: 1904; New York City, U.S.
- Died: 1966 (aged 61–62); Bay Shore, Long Island, U.S.
- Education: Williams College, Columbia University
- Occupations: Accountant, businessman, co-founder of Grumman Aircraft Engineering Corporation
- Organization: Grumman Aircraft Engineering Corporation
- Known for: Co-founding Grumman Aircraft Engineering Corporation
- Spouse(s): Catharine B. Wynkoop (divorced), Fannie B. Moore
- Children: 2

Edmund Ward Poor (1904–1966) was a co-founder of the Grumman Aircraft Engineering Corporation, serving as its treasurer and director. He was a wealthy accountant working as treasurer for the aviation pioneers Grover and Albert Loening who had agreed to invest in the company and invested $100,000 of his own money when the company was created.

The New York City native was the son of astronomer Charles Lane Poor and Anna Louise Easton and studied at both Williams College and Columbia University, obtaining his B.A. in 1927.

He was the treasurer of the village of Dering Harbor on Shelter Island. He and wife Catharine B. Wynkoop of Bath, New York, were the parents of Edmund W. Poor Jr. of the Boston Computer Society and Professor Henry W. Poor of the University of Miami in Florida. He subsequently married Fannie B. Moore in West Islip in December 1950.

Poor was an accomplished sailor, active in one design and offshore classes throughout his life. In 1961 he purchased a Block Island 40 yawl, which he named Starward. The name was created by combining his then wife Fannie's middle name, Starbird, with his own middle name. He campaigned Starward actively, with a crew of friends and family, including his sons Edmund and Henry, and his stepson and stepdaughter, John and Sally, and Sally's husband, Dr. Pier Mancusi-Ungaro. Poor fulfilled a lifelong dream when he skippered Starward in the 1962 Bermuda Race.

He drowned on the night of January 16, 1966 in the canal behind his home at 28 Garner Lane in Bay Shore on Long Island.
