= Columbia XJL =

Amphibious monoplane prototype

XJL-1
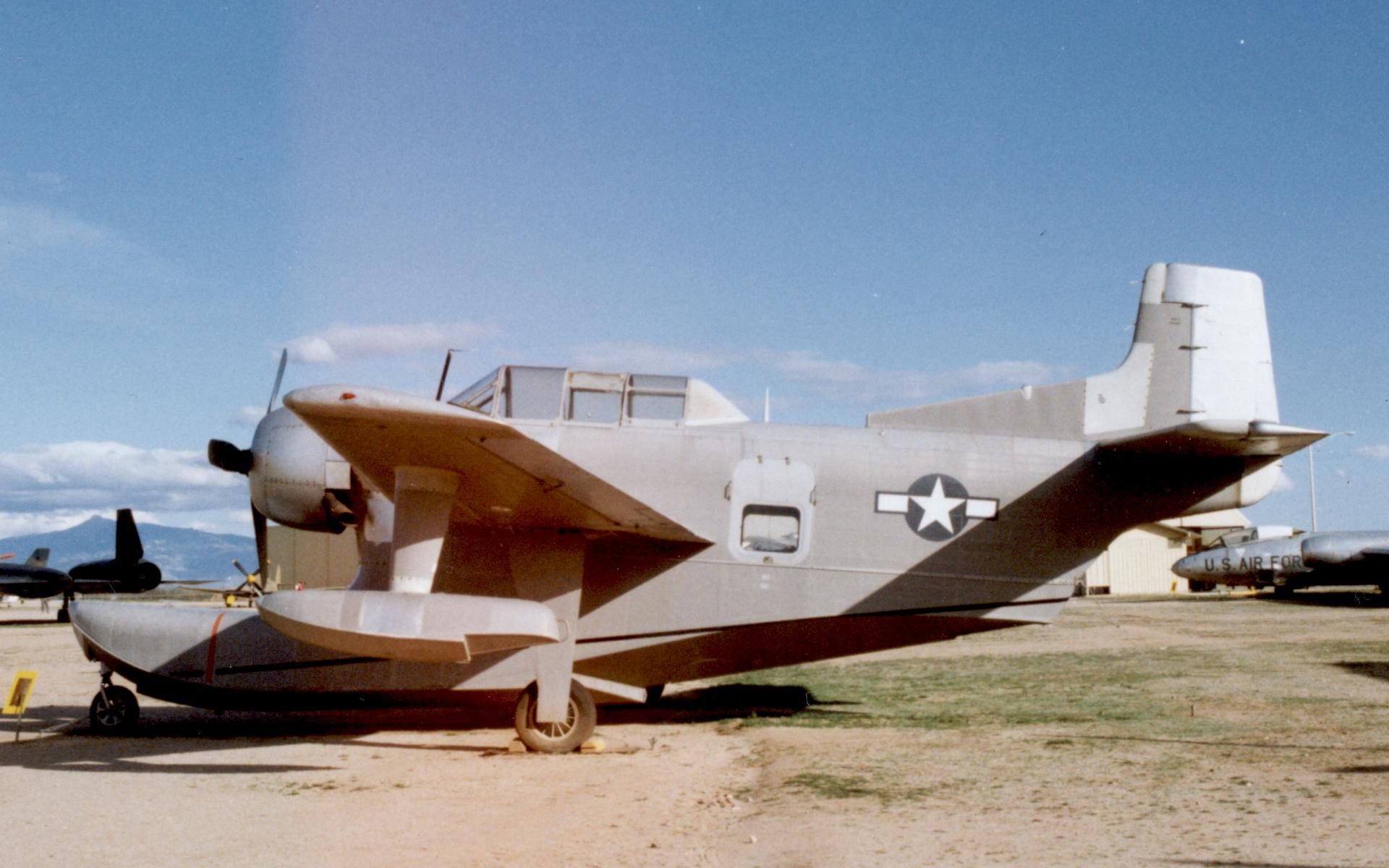
- The third Columbia XJL-1 preserved at the Pima Air Museum near Tucson, Arizona, in February 1993

General information
- Type: Single-engine amphibian
- National origin: United States
- Manufacturer: Columbia Aircraft Corporation
- Designer: Grumman Aircraft
- Status: 1 flying in civil use; 1 preserved
- Primary user: United States Navy
- Number built: 3

History
- Introduction date: 1946

The Columbia XJL is a large single-engined amphibious aircraft designed by Grumman Aircraft but built by the Columbia Aircraft Corp. It was intended to replace the Grumman J2F Duck but the type did not reach production status.

== Design and development ==
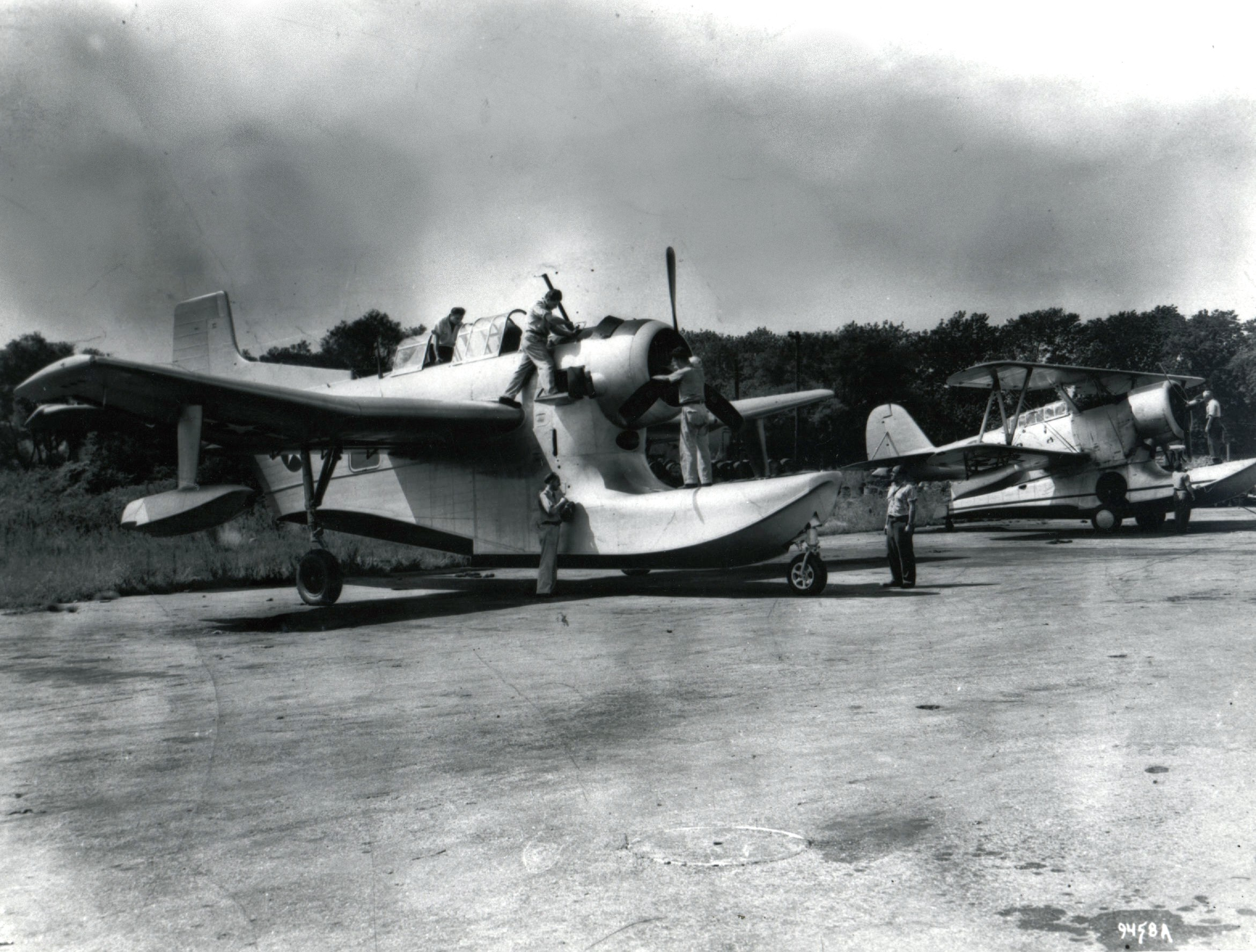
An XJL-1 and an example of the type it was intended to replace, the Grumman J2F Duck

The Grumman J2F Duck biplane amphibian had successfully served the United States Navy (USN) in quantity from late 1934 onwards. The final 330 examples were built in 1941/42 under sub-contract by the Columbia Aircraft Corp, retaining the J2F-6 designation.

At the end of World War II, Grumman completed a major re-design of the aircraft for the USN as a Wright R-1820-56 powered monoplane amphibian. The new design was turned over to the Columbia Aircraft Corporation for development and construction so that Grumman could focus on the production of fighter aircraft for the USN.

The aircraft strongly resembles the J2F Duck, except for its monoplane layout, and has been referred to as a "single-winged Duck". It is, however, a completely new design.

The USN ordered three XJL-1 experimental aircraft from Columbia, with the first being used for destructive strength testing on the ground. The remaining two airframes, assigned USN BuAer Nos 31399 and 31400, were delivered to the USNs test establishment at Patuxent River Naval Air Station Maryland for evaluation in 1946.

== Operational history ==
The two aircraft tested at Patuxent River were found to have repeated structural failures of various components. Testing was abandoned on 21 September 1948. The aircraft were deleted from the USN inventory in February 1949. No further orders were placed for production of the JL design. The aircraft were sold as surplus in 1959. 31399 was registered N54207 and is undergoing restoration at Yanks Air Museum, Chino, California. 31400 was registered N54205, and, restored, is now on display at the Pima Air & Space Museum in Tucson, Arizona.

== Specifications ==
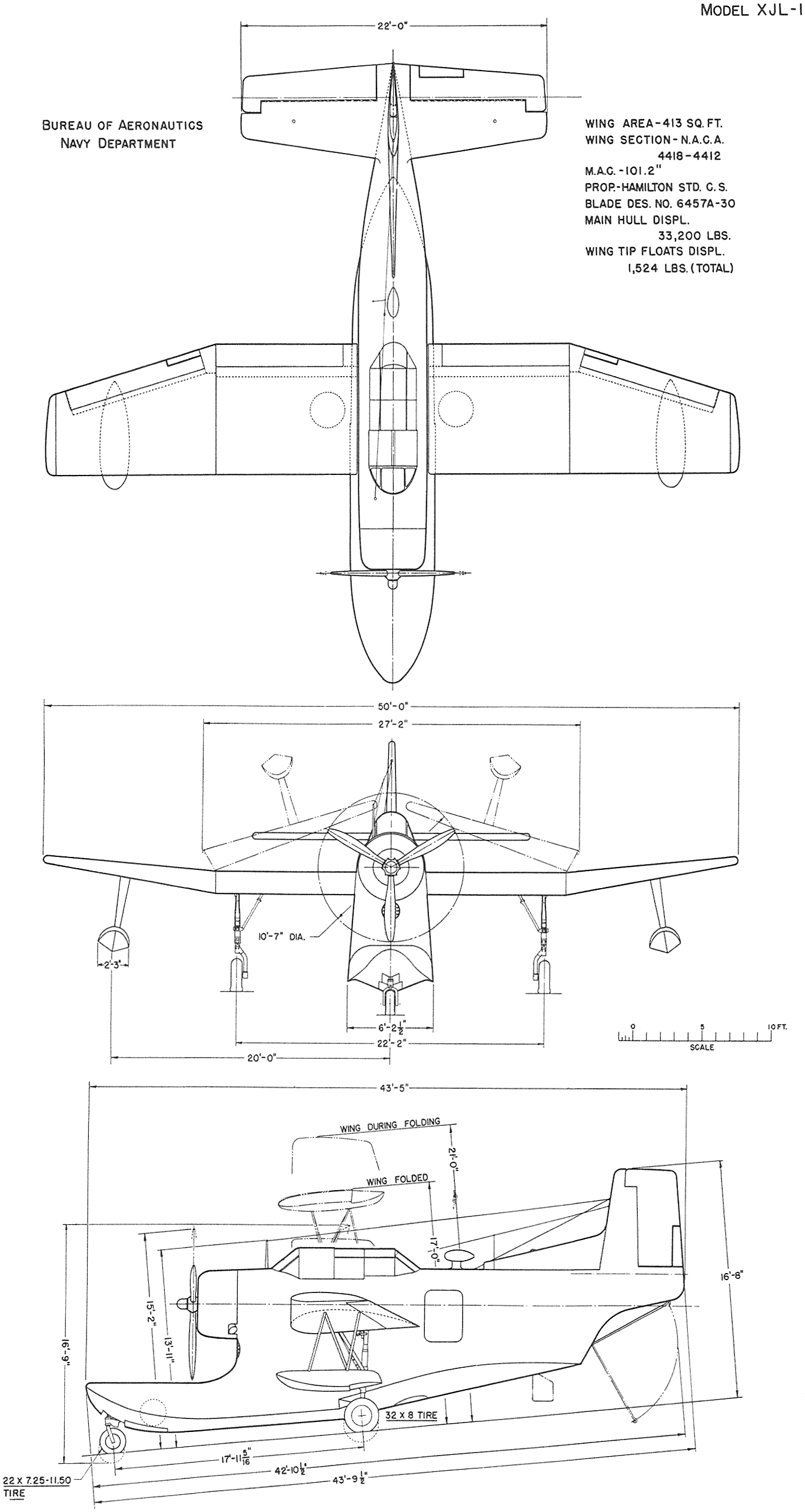
3-view line drawing of the Columbia XJL-1

Data from Plane Facts: Monoplane "Duck"

General characteristics

- Crew: 2
- Capacity: 6 passengers
- Length: 45 ft 11 in (14.00 m)
- Wingspan: 50 ft 0 in (15.24 m)
- Height: 16 ft 0 in (4.88 m)
- Wing area: 413 sq ft (38.4 m^{2})
- Empty weight: 7,250 lb (3,289 kg)
- Gross weight: 13,000 lb (5,897 kg)
- Powerplant: 1 × Wright R-1820-56 , 1,350 hp (1,010 kW)

Performance

- Maximum speed: 200 mph (320 km/h, 170 kn) at 119 mph (103 kn; 192 km/h)
- Range: 2,070 mi (3,330 km, 1,800 nmi)
- Rate of climb: 1,110 ft/min (5.6 m/s)

== See also ==
Aircraft of comparable role, configuration, and era

- Grumman J2F Duck

Related lists

- List of United States Navy aircraft designations (pre-1962)
