= John Bierwirth =

American lawyer and businessman

John Cocks (Jack) Bierwirth (21 January 1924 in Lawrence, Nassau County, New York – 26 May 2013 in Freeport, New York) was an American lawyer and businessman. Bierwirth was an attorney by education, and a banking and financial expert by trade. He was best known as the CEO of Grumman during the 1970s and 1980s, a period of considerable reduction and downsizing in defense- and space-related industries.

== Biography ==
Bierwirth began his advanced schooling at Yale University, but it was interrupted by World War II. He joined the Navy, ending his service with the rank of Lt (j.g.). He completed his undergraduate schooling at Yale, receiving a degree in 1947 (Class of 45W), then enrolled at Columbia Law School, where he received a JD in 1950.

He began his business career with White & Case, a New York City law firm. He then moved to the New York Trust Company (later merged into Chemical bank), where he became expert in banking-related legal matters.

Bierwirth later joined National Distillers & Chemical Corporation, where he was responsible for creating petrochemical operations in Japan, Taiwan, Belgium, Brazil, Finland and Yugoslavia, and in increasing petrochemical operations in Northern Ireland, Italy, Switzerland, Argentina and Bolivia.

In 1972 Bierwirth left ND&CC to become Treasurer of the Grumman Corporation and, four months later, President. He was named chairman and CEO three years later. He was reportedly brought on board to assist the beleaguered company in staving off almost-certain bankruptcy. His first assignment was to renegotiate contracts which the company held with the Navy for production of the F-14 "Tomcat" fighter jet. By 1973 he was successful, although the revised contract sparked congressional criticism. He sold Gulfstream, a highly profitable business-jet unit in 1978, justifying the action by stating that Grumman "desperately needed" the cash infusion. In 1981 he fended off a takeover attempt by LTV, which was lauded by the company's workforce but initially criticized by some of the company's stockholders. In fact, LTV, a high-flying conglomerate had a largely underfunded pension plan. Grumman's was overfunded. LTV sought to solve its pension problem and planned to skim off the excess.

He attempted to diversify the company's area of business, building trucks for the US Postal Service, canoes for the recreational market, and city buses for Flxible.

Bierwirth retired from Grumman in 1988, after rising from Treasurer to president, then to Chief Executive, and finally chairman of the company. He lived in Lawrence, where he was born, for the remainder of his life. He died in a Freeport hospice of congestive heart failure.

== Personal ==
Bierwirth married Marion Bierwirth in 1947. She survived him, as also did their four children, John, Warren, Marion and Susan.

He enjoyed sports, participating on college baseball and squash racket teams. In later life he enjoyed tennis and fly fishing.

He participated in public service projects as well. He was on the delegation which eventually persuaded the Russians to leave Afghanistan. He, Cyrus Vance and Brent Scowcroft formed a committee to work with the People's Republic of China to further the peace process in East Asia. As Vance and Scowcroft took other assignments, Jack became chairman of the US side, which continued for several years. He served on the boards of many environmental organizations, the Yale–China Association and Adelphi University.
