= Grumman JF Duck =

American single-engine amphibious biplane

JF Duck
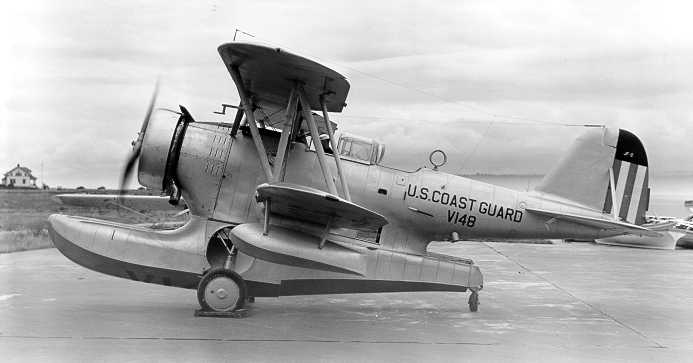
- Grumman JF-2 Duck in United States Coast Guard service

General information
- Type: Utility amphibian
- National origin: United States
- Manufacturer: Grumman
- Primary users: United States Navy United States Marine Corps; Argentine Navy; United States Coast Guard
- Number built: 48

History
- Introduction date: 1935
- First flight: 24 April 1933
- Variant: Grumman J2F Duck

The Grumman JF "Duck" was an American single-engine amphibious biplane built by Grumman for the United States Navy during the 1930s. The J2F Duck was an improved version of the JF, with its main difference being a longer float.

== Design and development ==
The Grumman JF Duck was manufactured from 1934 until 1936, when production switched to the J2F Duck and later variants. The more obvious external appearance clue to distinguish a JF from an early J2F is the deletion of the inter-aileron strut between the wings on the J2F; less noticeable perhaps is the J2F's slightly longer rear fuselage/float joining fillet beneath the tail.

The Duck's main pontoon was part of the fuselage, almost making it a flying boat, although it appears more like a standard aircraft with an added float. The XJF-1 prototype first flew on 24 April 1933 piloted by Grumman test pilot Paul Hovgard.

== Operational history ==
The JF-1 that was first ordered had the same Pratt & Whitney R-1830-62 engine as the XJF-1 prototype. The US Navy ordered 27 JF-1s with the first Ducks delivered beginning in May 1934 to Norfolk NAS. These early production series had provisions for mounting a machine gun at the rear seat facing aft, as well as a single bomb rack mounted under each wing, capable of carrying a 100 lb (45.4 kg) bomb or depth charge on each. The main float was also a Grumman design (Grumman Model "A") and like the prototype, it included retractable main landing gear, making the Duck a true amphibian. Ducks served as general/utility amphibians for photographic, target-towing, scouting, and rescue work.

== Variants ==
XJF-1
Prototype with 700 hp Pratt & Whitney R-1535-62 engine, one built (BuNo 9218).

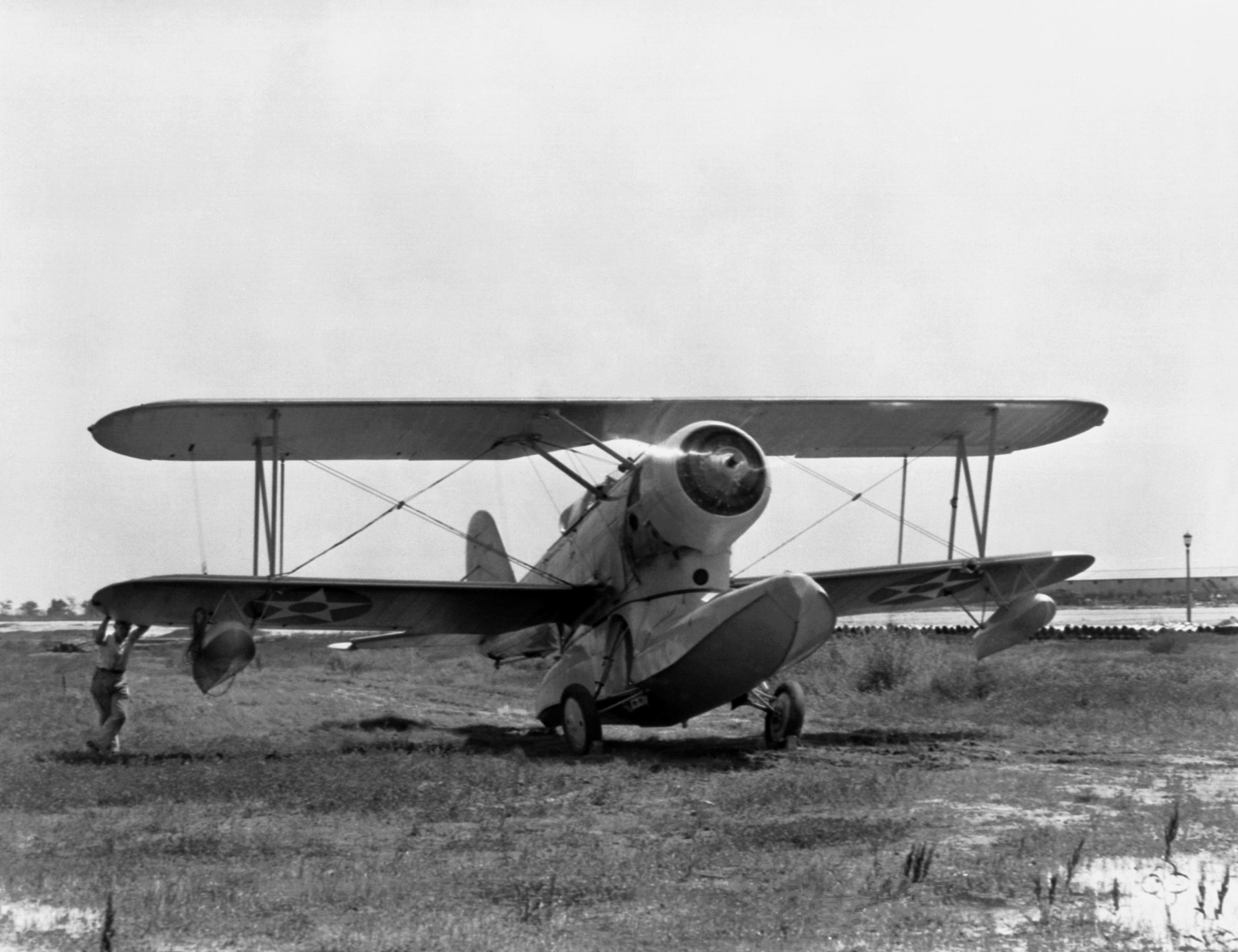
Grumman JF-1 Duck at Langley

JF-1
Production variant with 700 hp Pratt & Whitney R-1830-62 Twin Wasp engine, 27 built (BuNos 9434-9455, 9523-9527).
JF-2
Variant for the United States Coast Guard powered by a 750 hp Wright R-1820-102 Cyclone engine, 14 built with the first entering service in October 1934 (BuNo 0266, 00371-00372, 01647, USCG V141-V155).
JF-3
JF-2 for the U.S. Navy, five built (BuNos 9835-9839).
Grumman G-20
Armed version of the Grumman JF-2 for export to Argentina. Eight built.

== Operators ==
Argentina

- Argentine Navy – Operated eight G-20s.

United States

- United States Navy
- United States Coast Guard
- United States Marine Corps – Operated one JF-2

== Specifications (JF-2) ==
Data from

General characteristics

- Crew: 2–4
- Length: 33 ft 0 in (10.06 m)
- Wingspan: 39 ft 0 in (11.89 m)
- Height: 12 ft 8 in (3.86 m)
- Wing area: 409.0 sq ft (38.00 m^{2})
- Empty weight: 4,100 lb (1,860 kg)
- Gross weight: 5,760 lb (2,613 kg)
- Fuel capacity: 150 US gal (120 imp gal; 570 L)
- Powerplant: 1 × Pratt & Whitney R-1830 Twin Wasp 14-cyl two row air-cooled radial piston engine, 775 hp (578 kW)

Performance

- Maximum speed: 185 mph (298 km/h, 161 kn) at 7,000 ft (2,100 m)
- Cruise speed: 155 mph (249 km/h, 135 kn)
- Stall speed: 63 mph (101 km/h, 55 kn)
- Range: 620 mi (1,000 km, 540 nmi)
- Service ceiling: 22,000 ft (6,700 m)
- Rate of climb: 1,600 ft/min (8.1 m/s)

== See also ==
Related development

- Grumman J2F Duck

Aircraft of comparable role, configuration, and era

- Loening OL
- Loening C-2
- Bellanca XSOE
