= Grumman Kitten =

Type of aircraft

Kitten
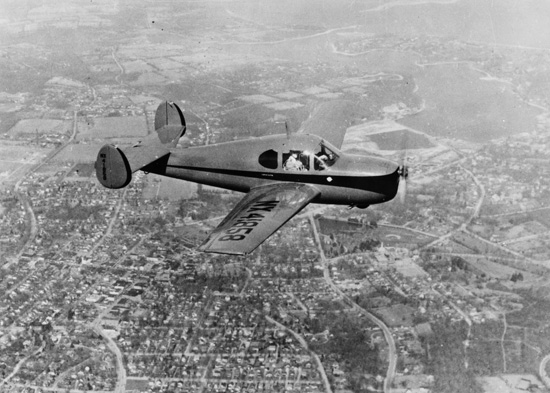
- G-72 Kitten

General information
- Type: Cabin monoplane
- National origin: United States
- Manufacturer: Grumman
- Designer: Dayton T. Brown
- Number built: 2

History
- First flight: 18 March 1944

The Grumman Kitten was a 1940s American cabin monoplane designed and built by Grumman. Two versions were built; the G-63 Kitten I with a retractable tailwheel landing gear, and G-72 Kitten II with a retractable nosewheel landing gear.

== Development ==
In 1943, as part of the postwar plan for the company, Grumman started looking at entering the light aircraft market. The first design was the G-63 Kitten I which was an all-metal two/three-seat cabin monoplane with a retractable tailwheel landing gear and powered by a Lycoming O-290 piston engine. The aircraft first flew on 18 March 1944. Although testing continued, the aircraft did not enter production due to the continuing war effort. The original wing was replaced by a ducted mainplane to improve the lift/drag ratio.

On 4 February 1946, a version with a retractable nosewheel landing gear and dual controls, the G-72 Kitten II was flown. The Kitten II also has improvements to the wing and the original single vertical tail was changed to twin fins before the first flight, but reverted to the single fin after the first 28 hours of flight testing.

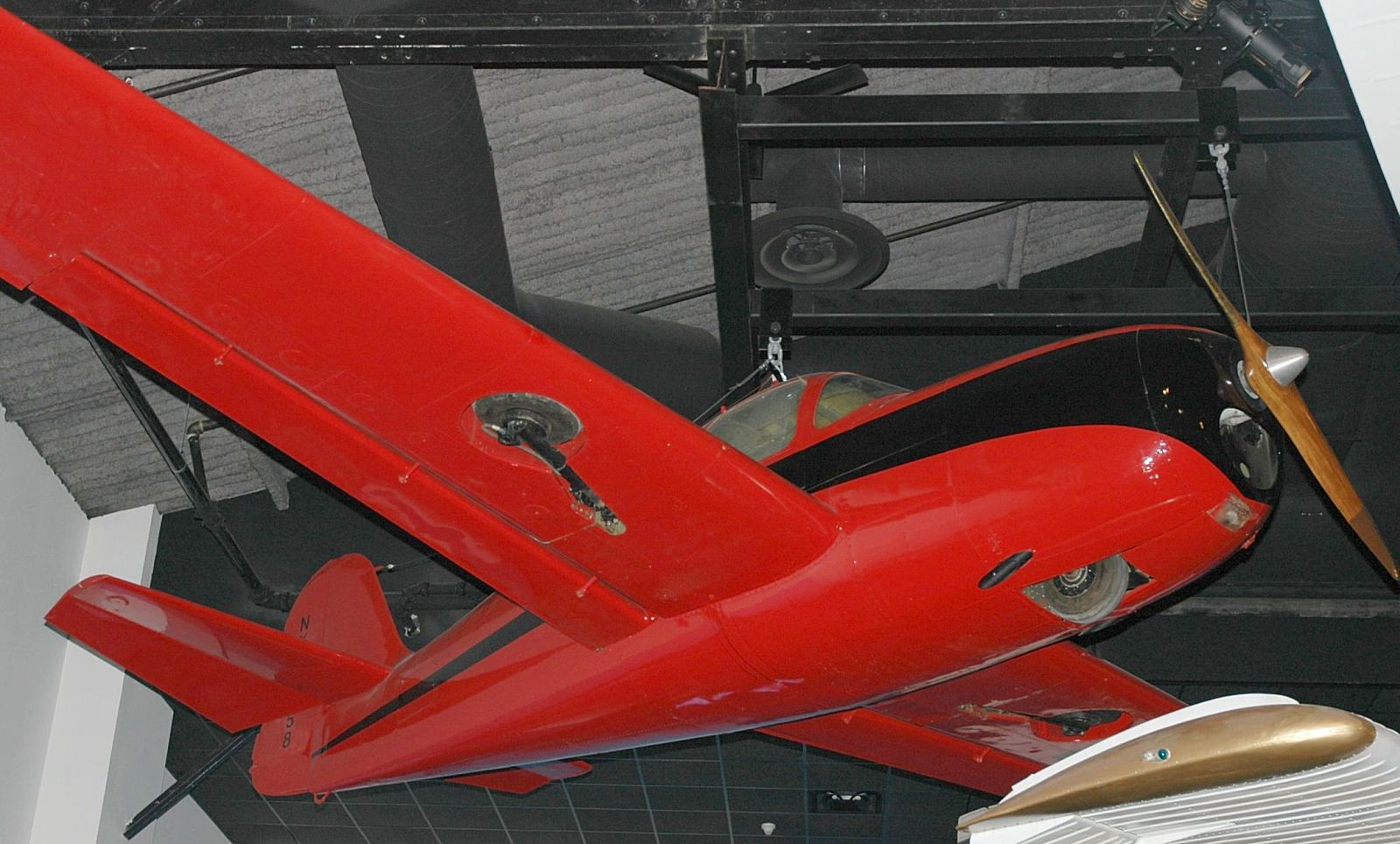
Kitten II on display with single fin and rudder.

The development project was terminated in 1946, and the Kitten II was used as a company transport until it was retired in the mid-1960s. The sole surviving Kitten, it was restored and is now on display at the Cradle of Aviation Museum, Garden City, Long Island, New York.

== Variants ==
G-63 Kitten I
Prototype with retractable tailwheel landing gear, one built.
G-72 Kitten II
Prototype with retractable nosewheel landing gear and dual controls, one built.
G-81
G-63 modified for ducted-wing tests.

== Specifications (G-63 Kitten I) ==
Data from

General characteristics

- Crew: one
- Capacity: two or three passengers
- Length: 19 ft 10.75 in (6.06 m)
- Wingspan: 32 ft 0 in (9.75 m)
- Height: 5 ft 9.25 in (1.76 m)
- Wing area: 130 sq ft (12.08 m^{2})
- Empty weight: 1,145 lb (519 kg)
- Gross weight: 1,900 lb (862 kg)
- Powerplant: 1 × Lycoming O-290-A flat-four piston engine , 125 hp (93 kW)

Performance

- Maximum speed: 149 mph (238 km/h, 129 kn)

== See also ==
Aircraft of comparable role, configuration, and era

- Aeronca 12 Chum
