= Grumman J2F Duck =

American single-engine amphibious biplane

J2F Duck
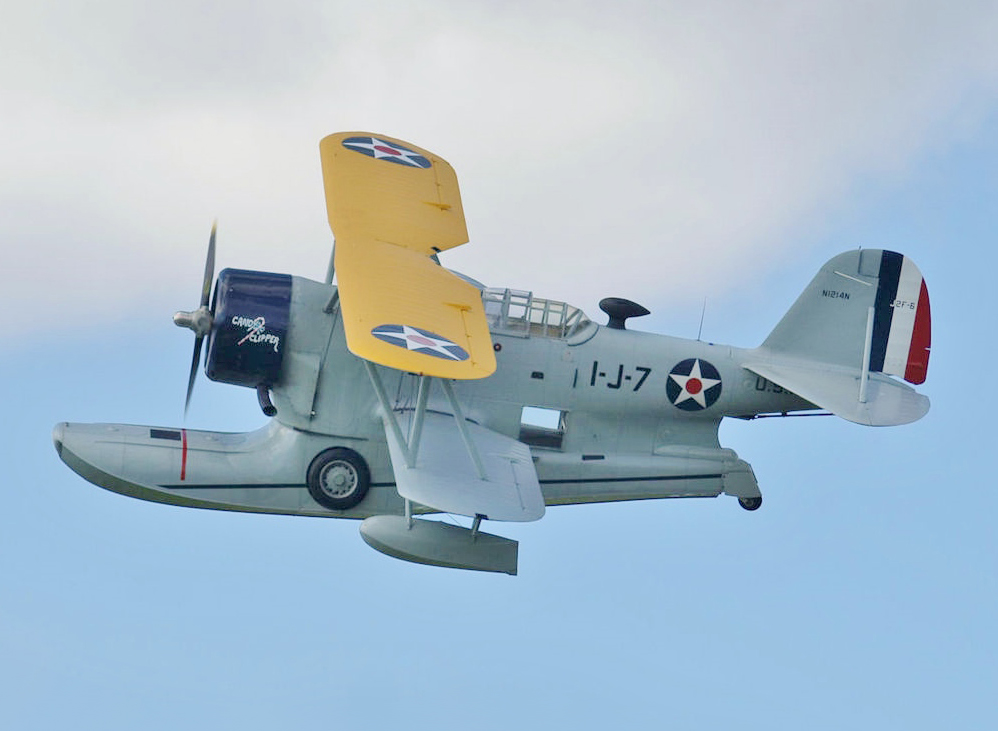
- Grumman J2F-6 Duck "Candy Clipper" BuNo 33549 / civil reg N1214N

General information
- Type: Utility amphibian
- National origin: United States
- Manufacturer: Grumman; Columbia Aircraft Corp
- Primary users: United States Navy United States Army Air Forces; United States Coast Guard; United States Marine Corps
- Number built: 584

History
- Introduction date: 1936
- First flight: 2 April 1936
- Developed from: Grumman JF Duck

The Grumman J2F Duck (company designation G-15) is an American, single-engined, amphibious biplane. It was used by each major branch of the U.S. Armed Forces from the mid-1930s until just after World War II, primarily for utility and air-sea rescue duties. It was also used by the Argentine Navy, which took delivery of their first example in 1937. After the war, J2F Ducks served independent civilian operators, as well as the armed forces of Colombia and Mexico.

The J2F was an improved version of the earlier JF Duck, the main differences being a longer float and a more-powerful engine (900 horsepower versus 775).

== Development ==
The J2F-1 Duck first flew on 2 April 1936, powered by a 750 hp (559 kW) Wright R-1820 Cyclone, and was delivered to the U.S. Navy on the same day. The J2F-2 had an uprated Wright Cyclone engine of 790 hp (589 kW). Twenty J2F-3 variants were built in 1939 for use by the Navy as executive transports with plush interiors. Due to pressure of work following the United States' entry into the war in 1941, production of the J2F Duck was transferred to the Columbia Aircraft Corp of New York. They produced 330 aircraft for the Navy and U.S. Coast Guard. If standard Navy nomenclature practice had been followed, these would have been designated JL-1s, but it was not, and all Columbia-produced airframes were delivered as J2F-6s.

Several surplus Navy Ducks were converted for use by the United States Air Force in the air-sea rescue role as the OA-12 in 1948.

== Design ==
The J2F was an equal-span, single-bay biplane with a large-monocoque central float, which also housed the retractable main landing gear, a similar design to the Leroy Grumman-designed landing gear first used for Grover Loening's early amphibious biplane designs, and later adopted for the Grumman FF fighter biplane. The aircraft had strut-mounted stabilizer floats beneath each lower wing. A crew of two or three was carried in tandem cockpits, forward for the pilot and rear for an observer with room for a radio operator if required. It had a cabin in the fuselage for two passengers or a stretcher.

The Duck's main pontoon was blended into the fuselage, making it almost a flying boat, despite its similarity to a conventional landplane that has been float-equipped. This configuration was shared with the earlier Loening OL, Grumman having acquired the rights to Loening's hull, float, and undercarriage designs. Like the F4F Wildcat, its narrow-tracked landing gear was hand-cranked.

== Operational history ==
The J2F was used by the U.S. Navy, Marines, Army Air Forces, and Coast Guard. Apart from general utility and light transport duties, its missions included mapping, scouting/observation, antisubmarine patrol, air-sea rescue work, photographic surveys, reconnaissance, and target tug.

J2Fs of the utility squadron of US Patrol Wing 10 were destroyed at Mariveles Naval Section Base, the Philippines, by a Japanese air raid on 5 January 1942. The only Duck to survive the attack had a dead engine, but had been concealed at Cabcaben airfield during the Battle of Bataan, to be repaired afterwards with a cylinder removed from a destroyed J2F-4 submerged in Manila Bay. Following repairs, the J2F-4 departed after midnight on 9 April 1942, overloaded with five passengers and the pilot, Roland J. Barnick, becoming the last aircraft to depart Bataan before its surrender to the Japanese only hours later. Among its passengers was Carlos P. Romulo (diplomat, politician, soldier, journalist, and author), who recounted the flight in his 1942 best-selling book I Saw the Fall of the Philippines (Doubleday, Doran & Company, Inc., Garden City, New York 1943, pp. 288–303), for which he received the Pulitzer Prize for Correspondence. J2F airplanes were later deployed to Guadalcanal for search & rescue of downed airmen.

== Variants ==
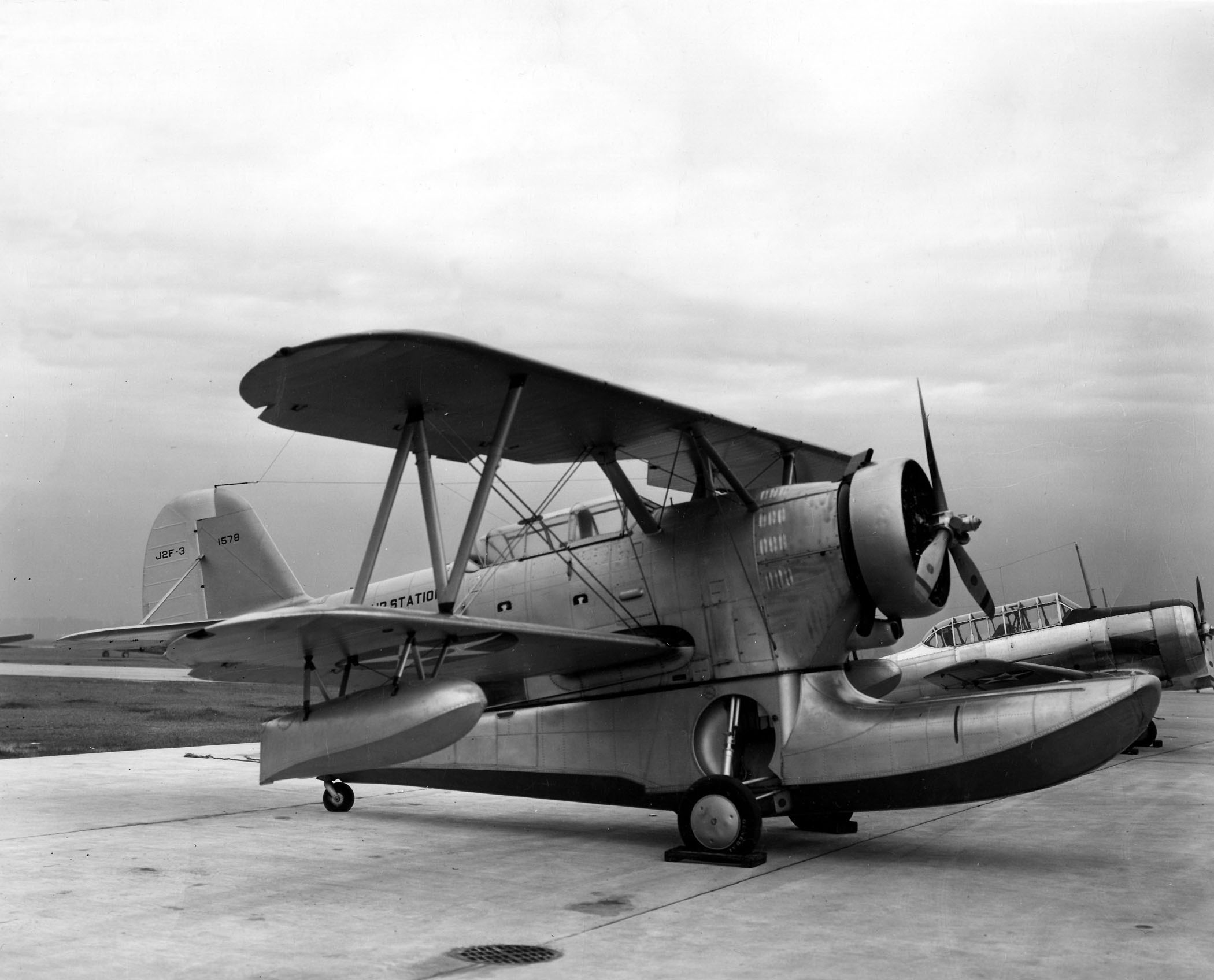
J2F-3 at NAS Jacksonville in 1940

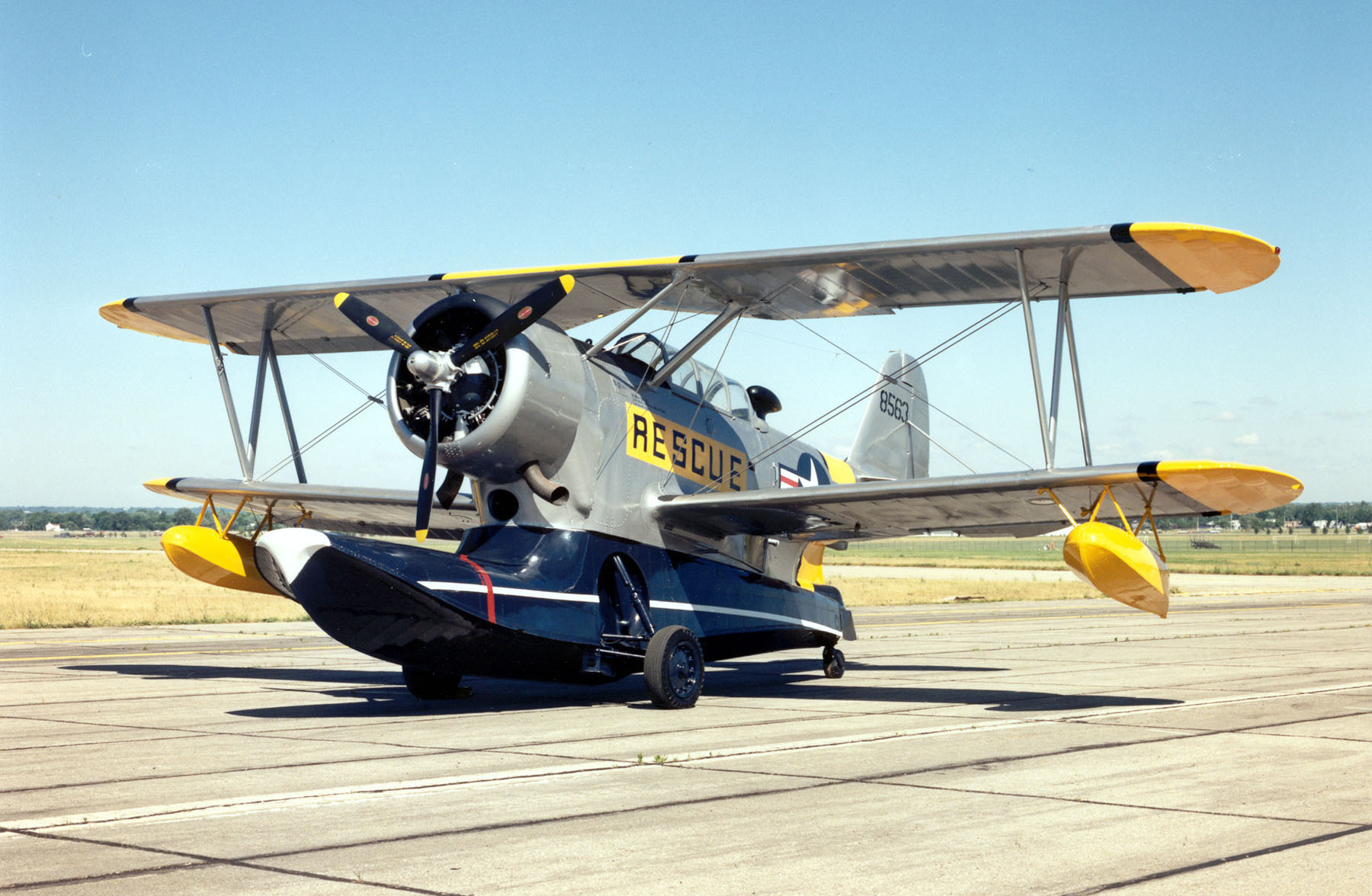
J2F-6 painted as an OA-12 at the National Museum of the United States Air Force

J2F-1
Initial production version with 750 hp R-1820-20 engines, 29 built.
J2F-2
United States Marine Corps version with nose and dorsal guns and underwing bomb racks, 21 built.
J2F-2A
As J2F-2 with minor changes for use in the United States Virgin Islands, nine built.
J2F-3
J2F-2 but powered by an 850 hp R-1820-26 engine, 20 built.
J2F-4
J2F-2 but powered by an 850 hp R-1820-30 engine and fitted with target towing equipment, 32 built.
J2F-5
J2F-2 but powered by a 1,050 hp R-1820-54 engine, 144 built.
J2F-6
Columbia Aircraft built version of the J2F-5 with a 1,050 hp R-1820-64 engine in a long-chord cowling, fitted with underwing bomb racks and provision for target towing gear; 330 built.
OA-12
Air-sea rescue conversion for the United States Army Air Forces (and later United States Air Force, OA-12A).

== Operators ==
Argentina

- Argentine Naval Aviation received four new-build Grumman G-15s (equivalent to J2F-4s) in 1939, to supplement the eight Grumman G-20s (export version of the Grumman JF-2) received in 1937. In 1946–1947, 32 ex-US Navy Ducks (consisting of one J2F-4, 24 J2F-5s, and 7 J2F-6s) were acquired, with the last examples remaining in use until 1958.

Colombia

- Colombian Navy (operated three examples from 1948).

Mexico

- Mexican Navy (operated three ex-U.S. Navy J2F-6s from 1950 to 1951).

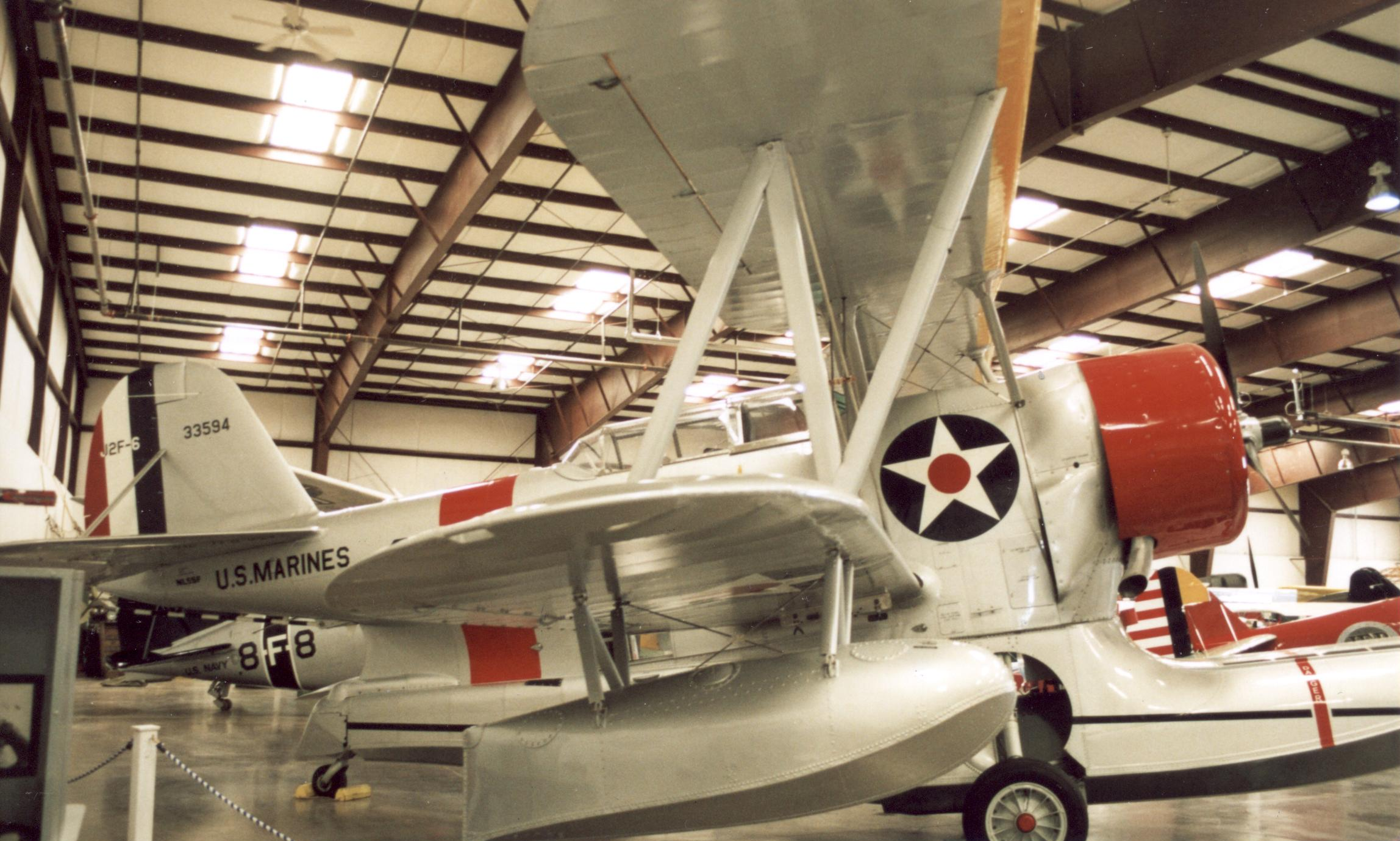
Columbia J2F-6 Duck in U.S. Marine Corps markings at the Planes of Fame Museum

Peru

- Peruvian Navy (operated one ex-USN example from 1961 to 1964).

United States

- United States Army Air Forces
- United States Coast Guard
- United States Marine Corps
- United States Navy

== Surviving aircraft ==
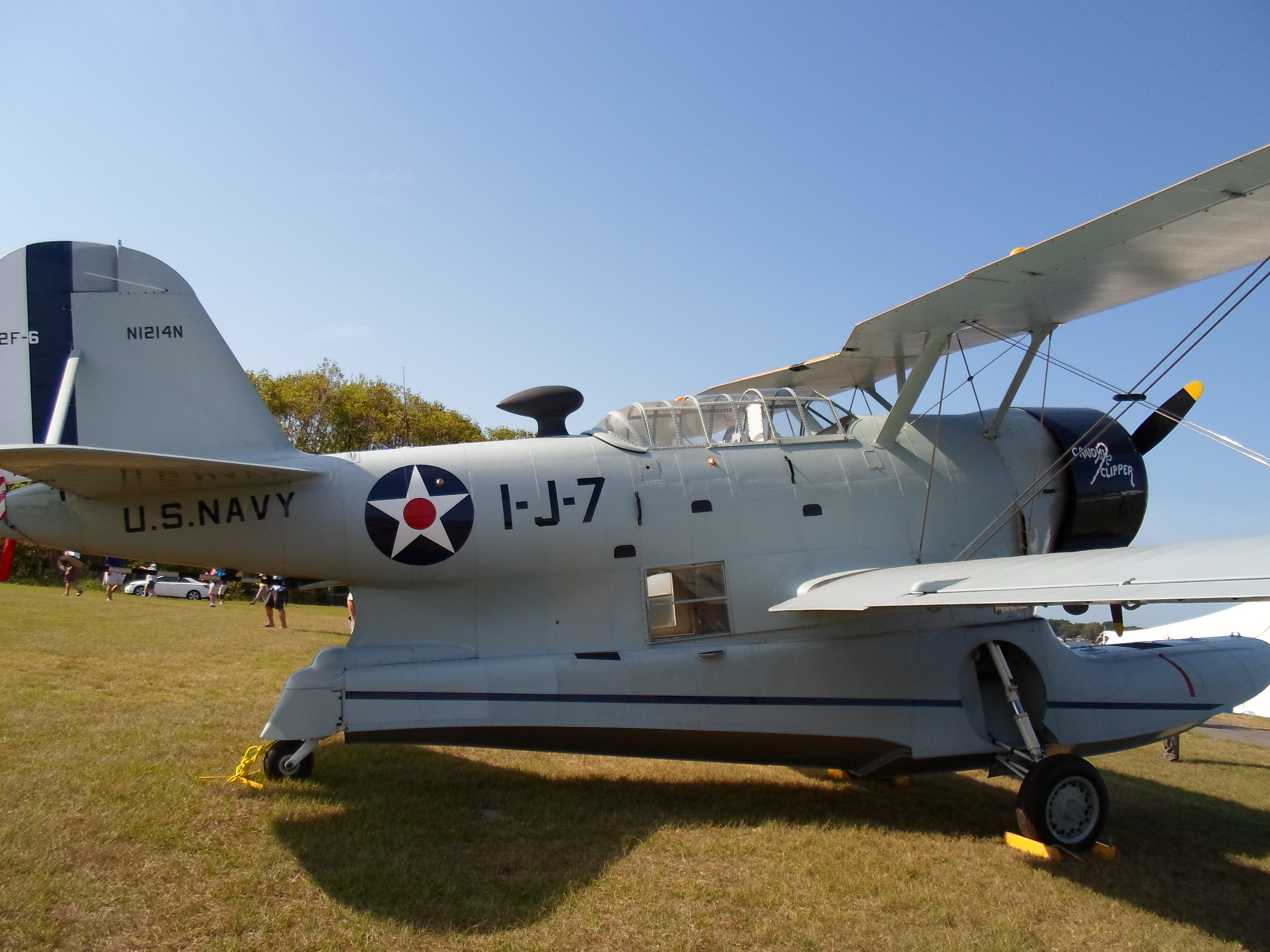
Grumman J2F-6 Duck owned by Fantasy of Flight

- 1649 – J2F-4 airworthy with the Mid America Flight Museum in Mount Pleasant, Texas.
- 33549 – J2F-6 airworthy at Fantasy of Flight in Polk City, Florida.
- 33559 – J2F-6 airworthy at the Erickson Aircraft Collection in Madras, Oregon.
- 33581 – J2F-6 on static display at the National Naval Aviation Museum in Pensacola, Florida.
- 33587 – J2F-6 on static display at the National Museum of the United States Air Force in Dayton, Ohio.
- 33594 – J2F-6 airworthy with Comanche Warbirds Inc. in Houston, Texas.
- 33614 – J2F-6 under restoration to airworthy for Fantasy of Flight in Polk City, Florida.
- 36976 – J2F-6 on static display at the EAA Aviation Museum in Oshkosh, Wisconsin.
- 48-0563 – OA-12 in storage with the Skyfire Corporation in Wilmington, Delaware.

== Specifications (J2F-6) ==
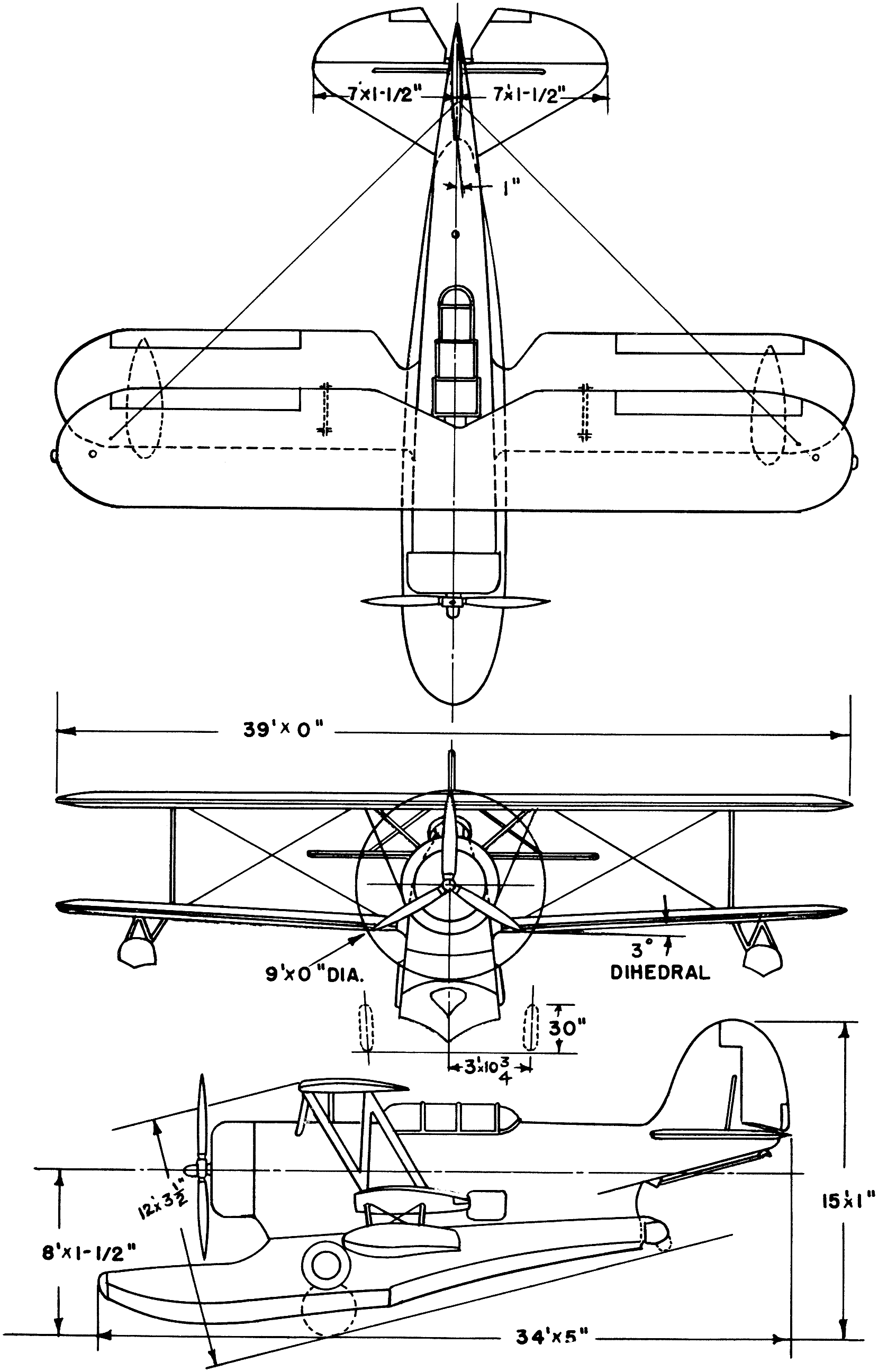
3-view line drawing of the Grumman J2F Duck

Data from Jane’s Fighting Aircraft of World War II

General characteristics

- Crew: 2
- Capacity: 2 survivors / passengers
- Length: 34 ft 0 in (10.36 m)
- Wingspan: 39 ft 0 in (11.89 m)
- Height: 13 ft 11 in (4.24 m)
- Wing area: 409 sq ft (38.0 m^{2})
- Airfoil: Clark CHY
- Empty weight: 5,480 lb (2,486 kg)
- Gross weight: 7,700 lb (3,493 kg)
- Powerplant: 1 × Wright R-1820-54 Cyclone 9-cylinder air-cooled radial piston engine, 900 hp (670 kW)
- Propellers: 3-bladed constant-speed propeller

Performance

- Maximum speed: 190 mph (310 km/h, 170 kn)
- Cruise speed: 155 mph (249 km/h, 135 kn)
- Stall speed: 70 mph (110 km/h, 61 kn)
- Range: 780 mi (1,260 km, 680 nmi)
- Service ceiling: 20,000 ft (6,100 m)

Armament

- Guns: 1 × Browning .30 cal machine gun (7.62 mm) on flexible mount in rear cockpit
- Bombs: 2× 100 lb (45 kg) bombs or 325 lb (147 kg) depth charges underwing

== Cultural impact ==
A J2F Duck was used in the 1971 film Murphy's War, which includes a spectacular three-minute rough-water takeoff scene along with numerous flying and aerobatic sequences. The actual airplane used in this film is on display at the National Museum of the United States Air Force near Dayton, Ohio, although it has been restored and painted to represent a rescue OA-12.

== See also ==
Related development

- Grumman JF Duck
- Columbia XJL

Aircraft of comparable role, configuration, and era

- Loening OL
- Bellanca XSOE
- Nikitin NV-4

Related lists

- List of aircraft of World War II
