= Edward Erie Poor =

American banker

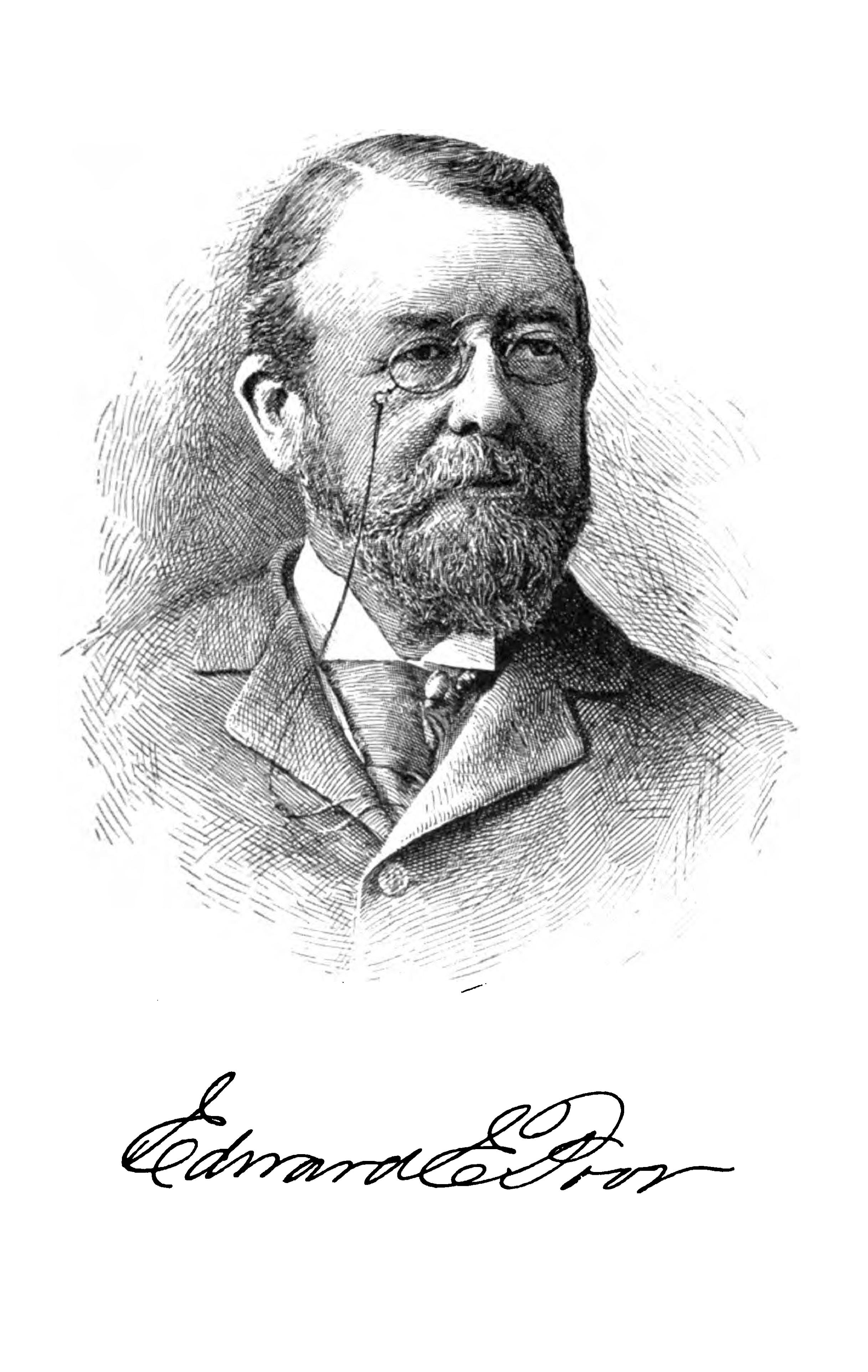
Edward Erie Poor

Edward Erie Poor, Sr. (February 5, 1837 – July 29, 1900) was an American banker. He served as Vice-President and then President of the National Park Bank from 1895-1900, succeeding Ebenezer K. Wright and followed by Richard Delafield. Born in Boston, Poor was an advocate of the gold standard during the free silver debate of the late 1890s.
