= Bellanca XSOE =

XSOE
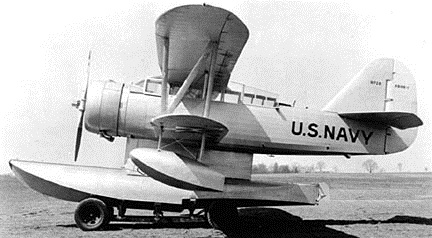

General information
- Type: Scout
- National origin: United States
- Manufacturer: Bellanca Aircraft Company
- Number built: 1

History
- First flight: 1936

The Bellanca XSOE was a prototype American scout observation floatplane built for the United States Navy by the Bellanca Aircraft Company. It was never accepted by the Navy and only the prototype was built.

The prototype was designated XSOE-1 by the United States Navy and it first flew in 1936. The XSOE-1 was a single-float biplane with one additional float under each low wing. Powered by a 725 hp (541 kW) Wright R-1820 radial engine, it had an enclosed cabin for a crew of two.

== Specifications (XSOE-1) ==
Data from

General characteristics

- Crew: two
- Length: 34 ft 11 in (10.64 m)
- Wingspan: 41 ft 0 in (12.50 m)
- Powerplant: 1 × Wright R-1820 , 725 hp (541 kW)

== See also ==
Related lists

- List of United States Navy aircraft designations (pre-1962)
