= Grumman =

American aerospace company (1929–1994)

Grumman Corporation
- Industry: Aircraft; aircraft parts and equipment; data processing and preparation; search and navigation equipment; truck and bus bodies; electrical equipment and supplies
- Founded: December 6, 1929; 96 years ago
- Founders: Leroy Grumman; Edmund Ward Poor; William T. Schwendler; Jake Swirbul
- Defunct: April 4, 1994; 32 years ago
- Fate: Merged with Northrop
- Successors: Northrop Grumman; Gulfstream Aerospace
- Headquarters: Bethpage, New York, U.S.
- Key people: Thomas J. Kelly; Corwin H. Meyer; David Thurston; George F. Titterton
- Products: Grumman F4F Wildcat; Grumman F6F Hellcat; Grumman TBF Avenger; Grumman A-6 Intruder; Grumman F-14 Tomcat; Apollo Lunar Module; Grumman LLV
- Number of employees: 23,000 (1986)
- Subsidiaries: Grumman Aerospace Corp.; Grumman Allied Industries, Inc.; Grumman Data Systems Corp.

The Grumman Aircraft Engineering Corporation, later Grumman Aerospace Corporation, was a 20th century American producer of military and civilian aircraft. Founded on December 6, 1929, by Leroy Grumman and his business partners, it merged in 1994 with Northrop Corporation to form Northrop Grumman.

== History ==
Grumman historical marker

Leroy Grumman worked for the Loening Aircraft Engineering Corporation beginning in 1920. In 1929, Keystone Aircraft Corporation bought Loening Aircraft and moved its operations from New York City to Bristol, Pennsylvania. Grumman and three other ex-Loening Aircraft employees, (Edmund Ward Poor, William Schwendler, and Jake Swirbul) started their own company in an old Cox-Klemin Aircraft Co. factory in Baldwin on Long Island, New York.

The company registered as a business on December 6, 1929, and officially opened on January 2, 1930. While maintaining the business by welding aluminum tubing for truck frames, the company eagerly pursued contracts with the US Navy. Grumman designed the first practical floats with a retractable landing gear for the Navy, and this launched Grumman into the aviation market. The first Grumman aircraft was also for the Navy, the Grumman FF-1, a biplane with retractable landing gear developed at Curtiss Field in 1931. This was followed by a number of other successful designs.

Grumman Corporation logo, ca. 1976

During World War II, Grumman became known for its "Cats" (Navy fighter aircraft): the F4F Wildcat and F6F Hellcat, the Grumman F7F Tigercat and Grumman F8F Bearcat, and also for its torpedo bomber, the Grumman TBF Avenger. Grumman ranked 22nd among United States corporations in the value of wartime production contracts. Production of the majority of the Wildcats and Avenger was subcontracted to a purposely established division of General Motors : the Eastern Aircraft Division. Grumman's first jet aircraft was the F9F Panther; it was followed by the upgraded F9F/F-9 Cougar, and the F-11 Tiger in the 1950s. The company's big postwar successes came in the 1960s with the A-6 Intruder and E-2 Hawkeye and in the 1970s with the Grumman EA-6B Prowler and F-14 Tomcat. Grumman products were prominent in several feature movies including The Final Countdown in 1980, Top Gun in 1986, and Flight of the Intruder in 1990. The U.S. Navy still employs the Hawkeye as part of Carrier Air Wings on board aircraft carriers, while the U.S. Marine Corps, the last branch of service to fly the Prowler, retired it on March 8, 2019.

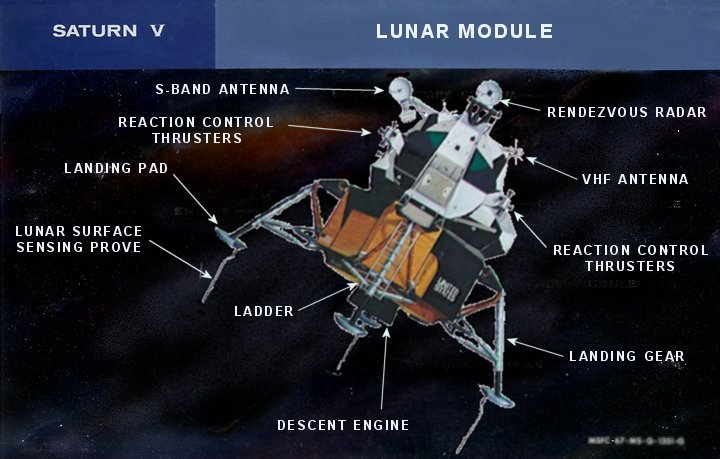
Apollo Spacecraft: Apollo Lunar Module Diagram

Grumman was the chief contractor on the Apollo Lunar Module, the first spacecraft to land humans on the Moon. The firm received the contract on November 7, 1962, and built 13 lunar modules. Six of them successfully landed on the Moon, with one serving as a lifeboat on Apollo 13, after an explosion crippled the main Apollo spacecraft. LM-2, a test article which never flew in space, is displayed permanently in the Smithsonian Institution. As the Apollo program neared its end, Grumman was one of the main competitors for the contract to design and build the Space Shuttle, but lost to Rockwell International.

In 1969, the company changed its name to Grumman Aerospace Corporation, and in 1978 it sold the Grumman-American Division to Gulfstream Aerospace. That same year, it acquired the bus manufacturer Flxible. The company built the Grumman Long Life Vehicle (LLV), a light transport mail truck designed for and used by the United States Postal Service. The LLV was produced between 1986 until 1994, intended for a service life of 24 years, later being extended to 30 years. A large portion of LLVs are still in operation with the United States Postal Service.

In 1983, Grumman sold Flxible for $40 million to General Automotive Corporation of Ann Arbor.

In the 1950s, Grumman began production of Gulfstream business aircraft, starting with the Gulfstream I turboprop (Grumman model G-159) and the Gulfstream II jet (Grumman model G-1159). Gulfstream aircraft were operated by many companies, private individuals, and government agencies including various military entities and NASA. In addition, the Gulfstream I was operated by several regional airlines in scheduled passenger services. The Gulfstream I-C (Grumman model G-159C) version was "stretched" to carry 37 passengers.

In the early 1970s, Grumman acquired majority interest in the American Aviation line of very light aircraft -- relabeling its planes as "Grumman-American" or "Grumman American" -- eventually joining it with their Gulfstream division before selling off that combined enterprise in 1978.

In 1978, Grumman sold Gulfstream to American Jet Industries, which adopted the Gulfstream name. Since 1999, Gulfstream has been a wholly owned subsidiary of General Dynamics.

== Long Island locations ==
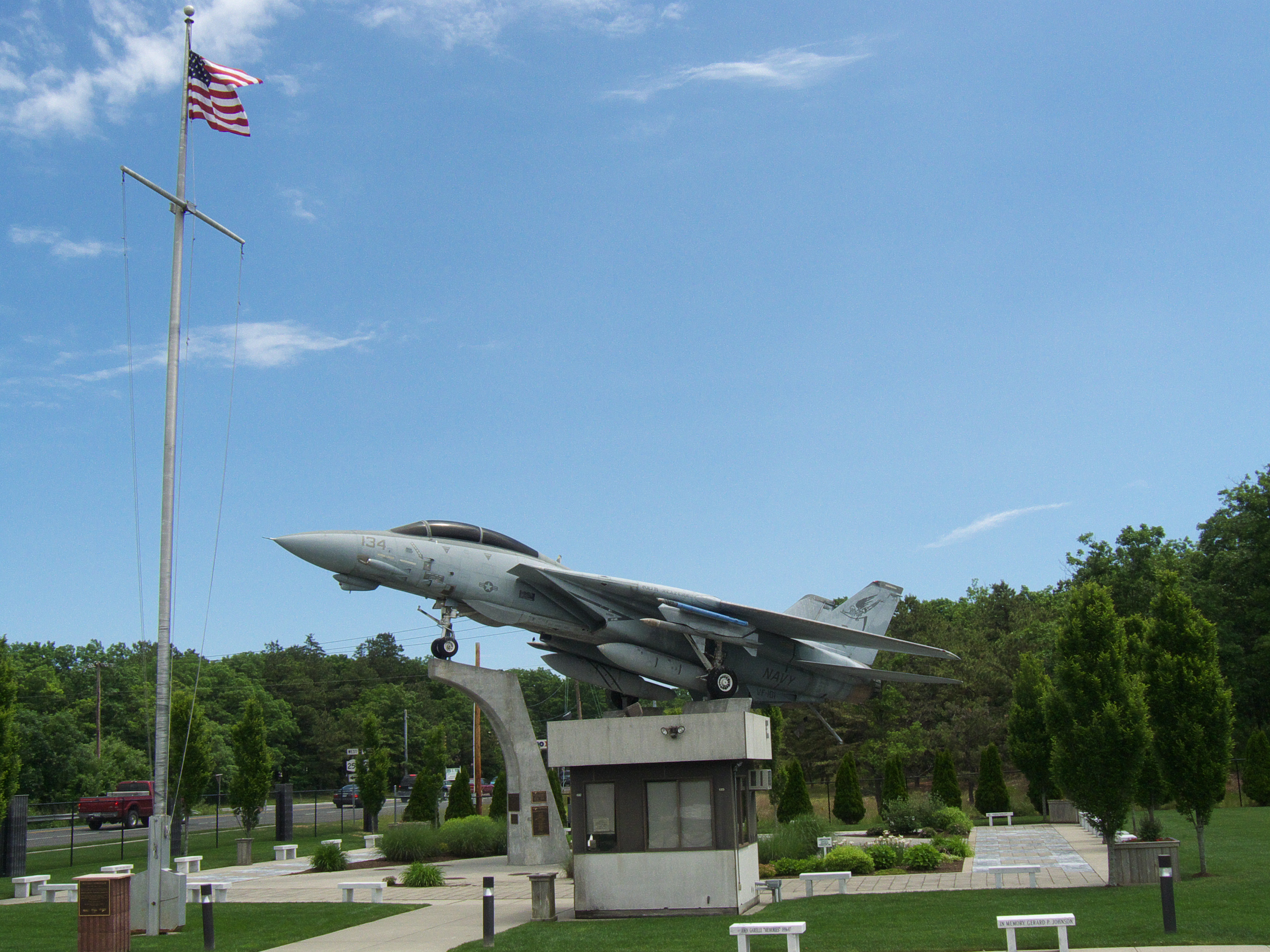
F-14 Tomcat at Grumman Memorial Park, Calverton, New York

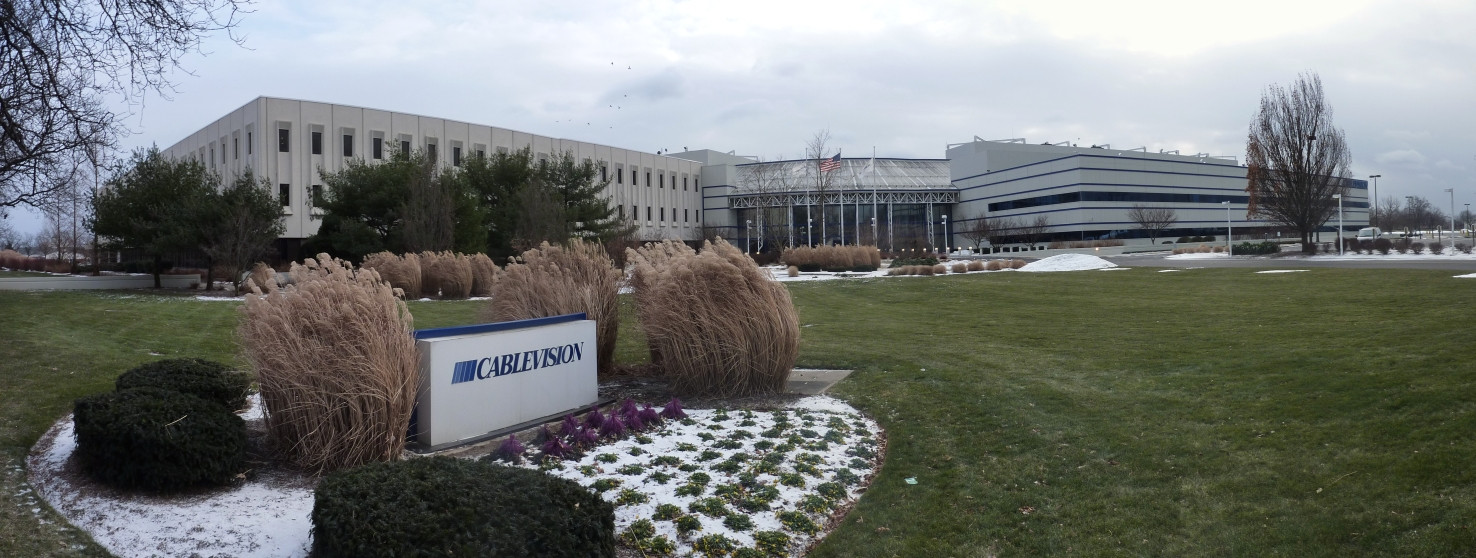
Grumman's former headquarters in Bethpage, now Optimum Communications (formerly Cablevision) headquarters

For much of the Cold War period, Grumman was the largest corporate employer on Long Island. Grumman's products were considered so reliable and ruggedly built that the company was often referred to as the "Grumman Iron Works".

As the company grew, it moved to Valley Stream, New York, then Farmingdale, New York, finally to its facility in Bethpage, New York, with the testing and final assembly at the 6,000-acre (24 km^{2}) Naval Weapons Station in Calverton, New York, all located on Long Island. At its peak in 1986 it employed 23,000 people on Long Island and occupied 6,000,000 square feet (560,000 m^{2}) in structures on 105 acres (0.42 km^{2}) it leased from the U.S. Navy in Bethpage.

The end of the Cold War at the beginning of the 1990s reduced defense spending and led to a wave of mergers as aerospace companies shrank in number; in 1994 Northrop bought Grumman for $2.1 billion to form Northrop Grumman, after Northrop topped a $1.9 billion offer from Martin Marietta.

The new company closed almost all of its facilities on Long Island and converted the Bethpage plant to a residential and office complex, with its headquarters becoming the corporate headquarters for Cablevision and the Calverton plant being turned into a business/industrial complex. Former aircraft hangars have become Grumman Studios, a film and television production center. A portion of the airport property has been used for the Grumman Memorial Park.

== Products ==
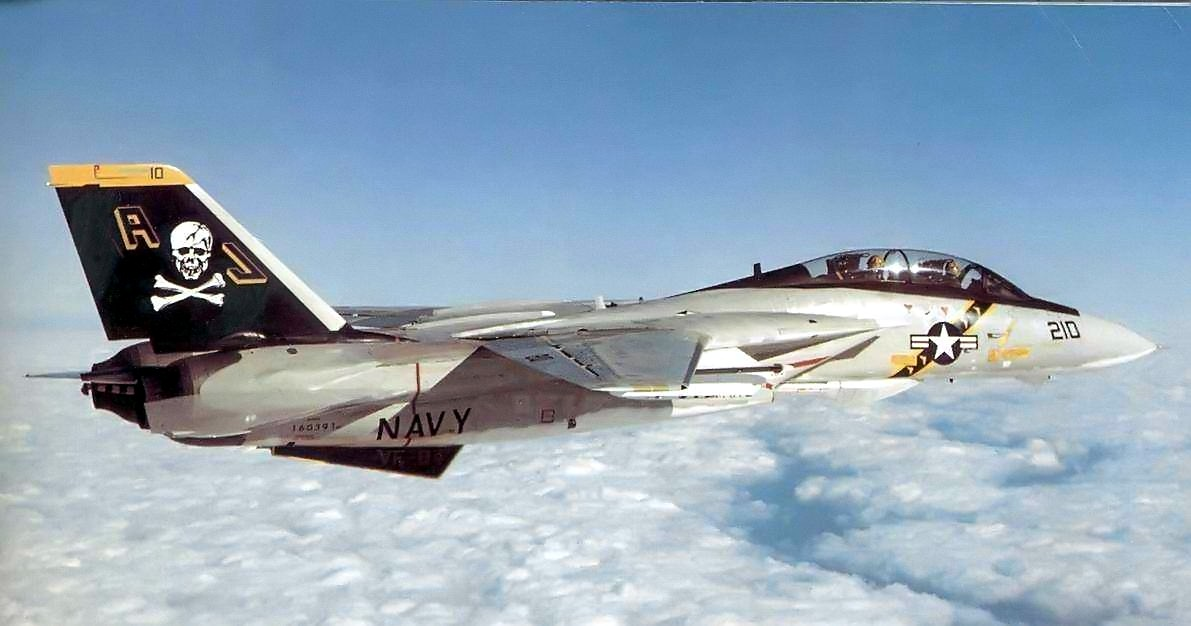
An F-14A Tomcat of VF-84 Jolly Rogers, in the old color scheme from the beginning of its service

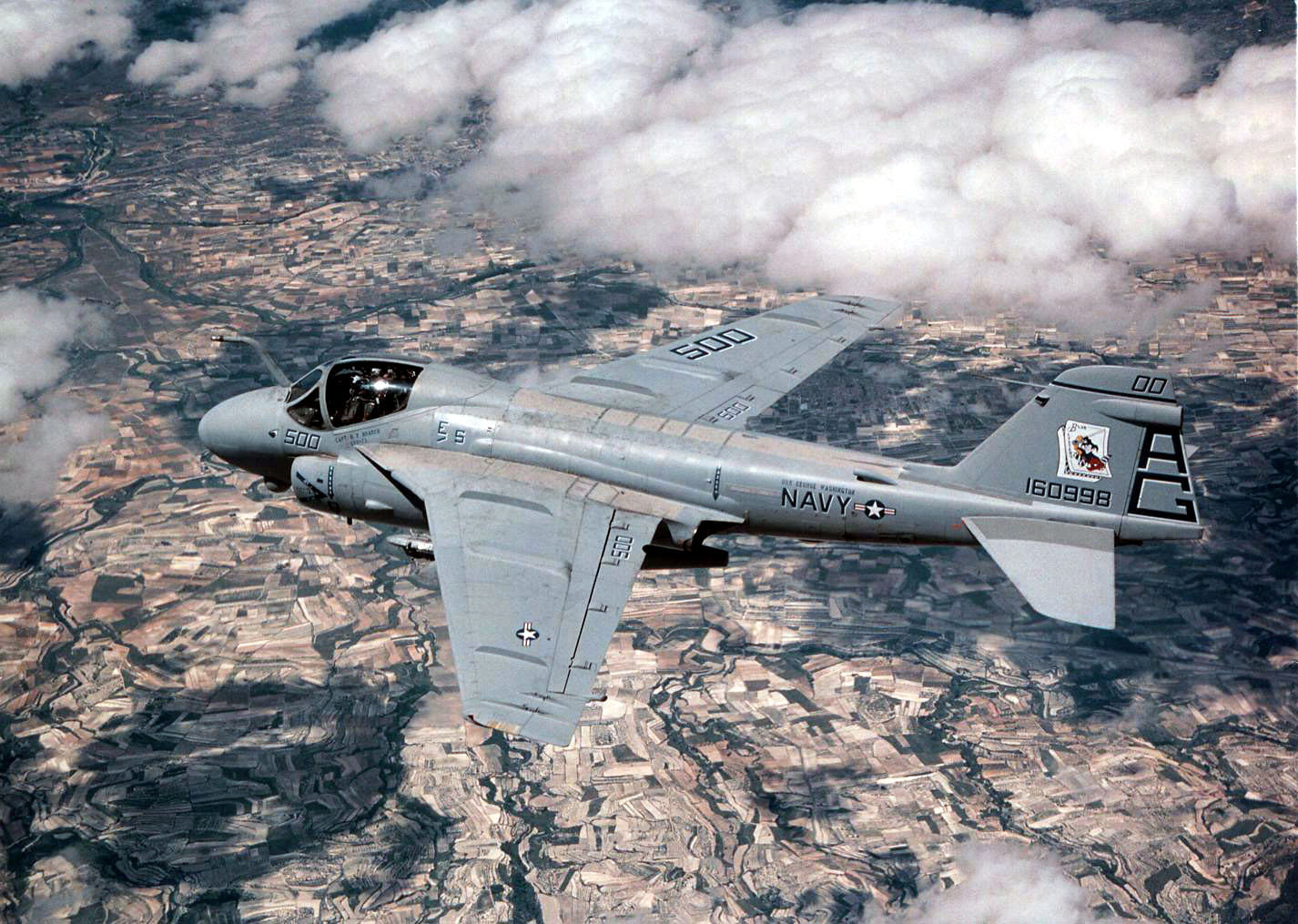
An A-6E Intruder flying over Spain during Exercise Matador

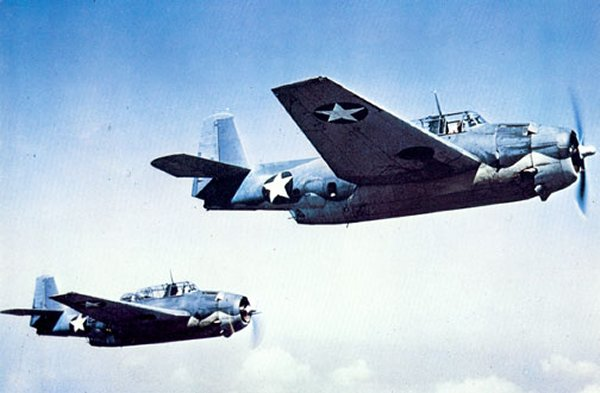
TBF Avenger

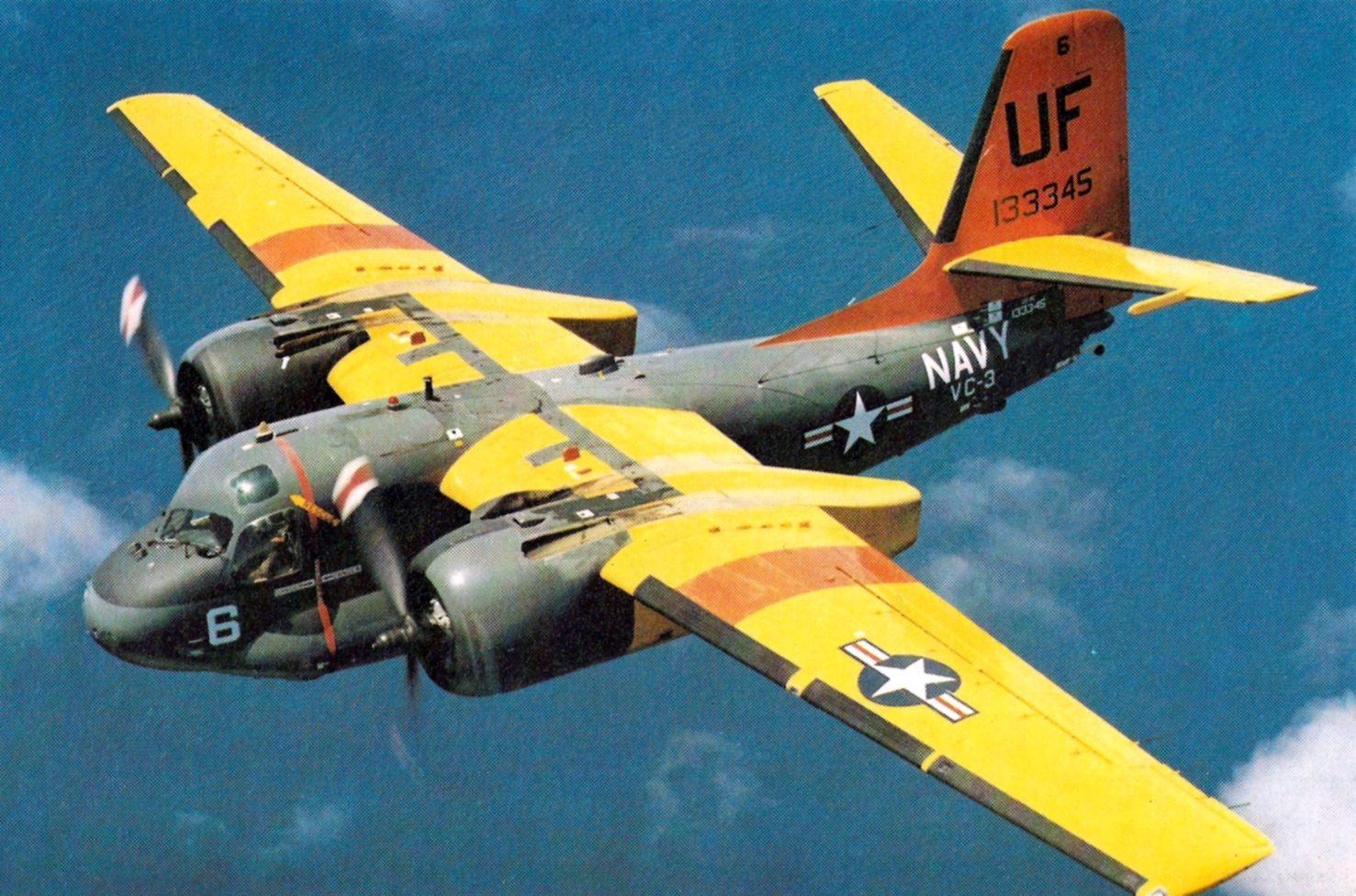
Navy Grumman US-2C Tracker

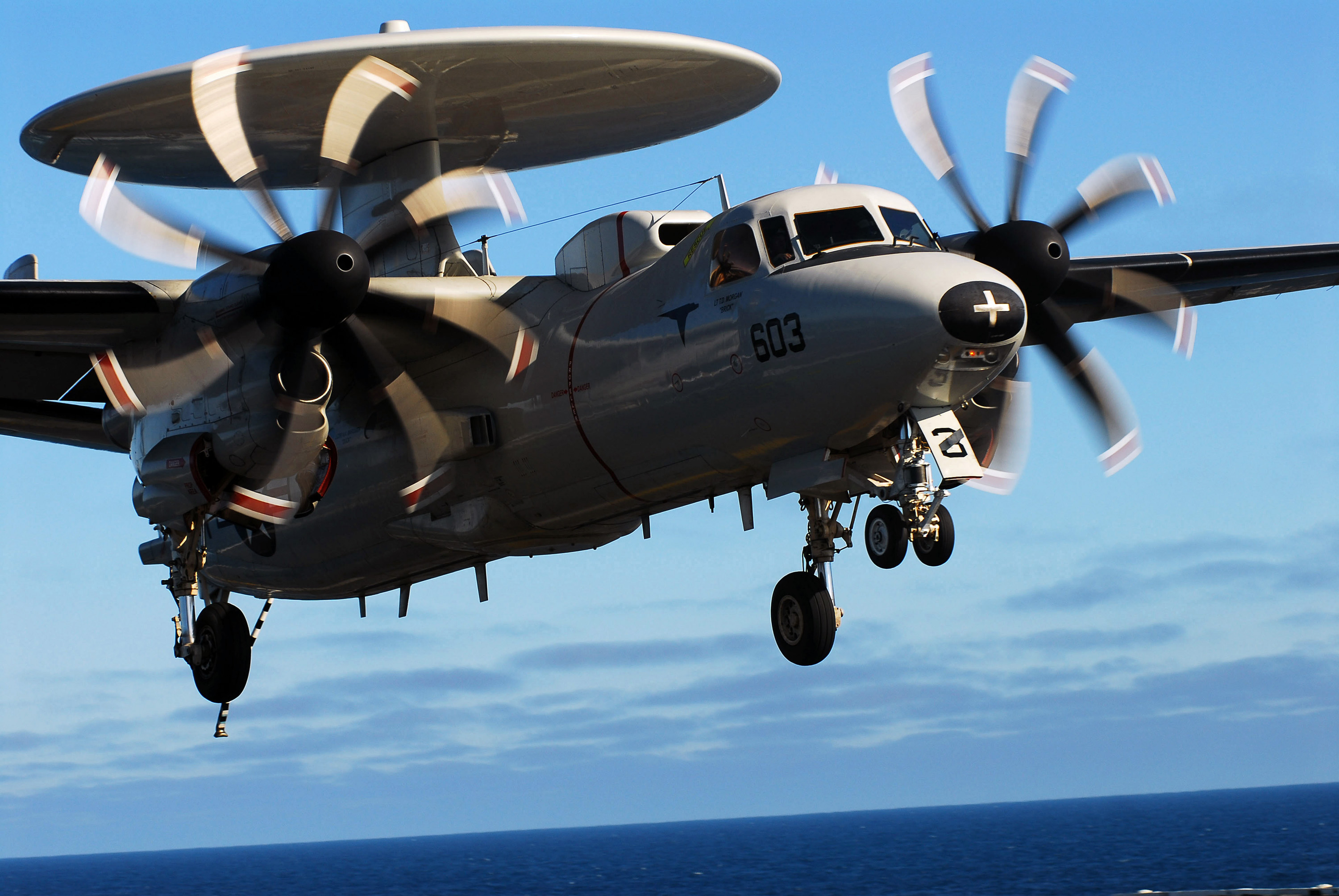
E-2C Hawkeye

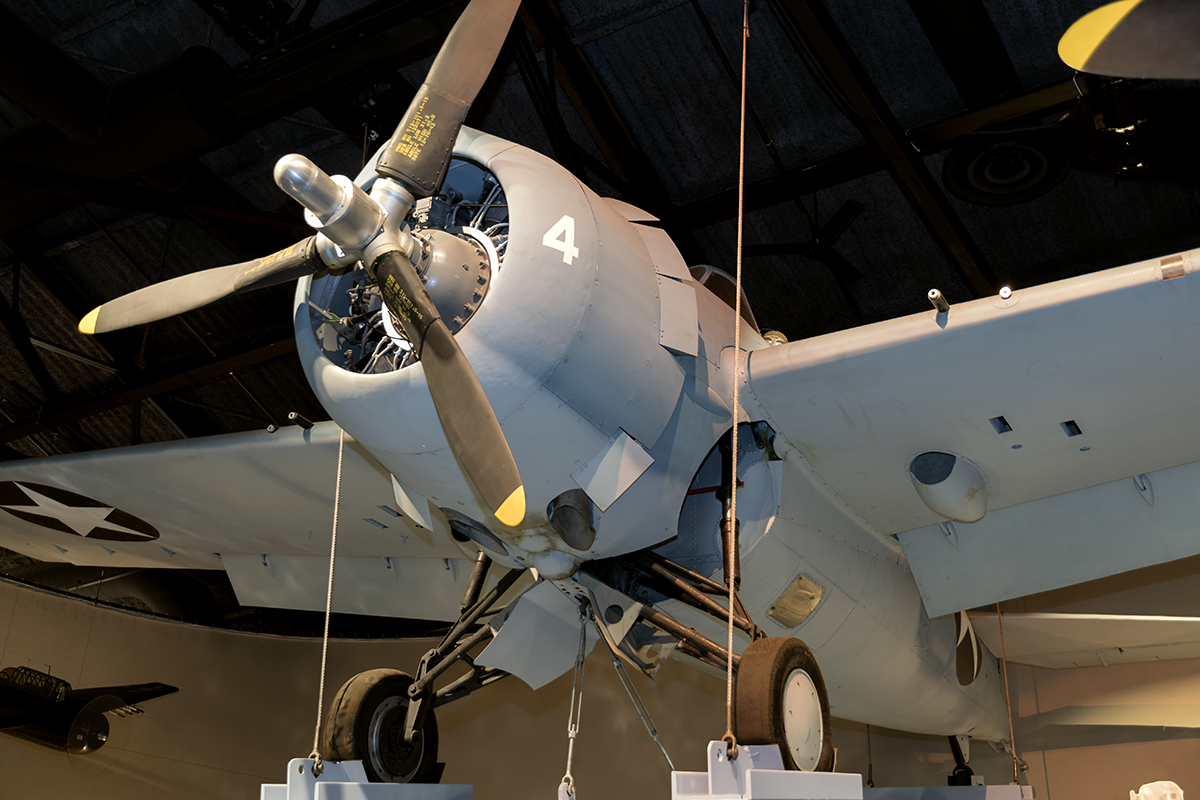
F4F-3 Wildcat Bu12297

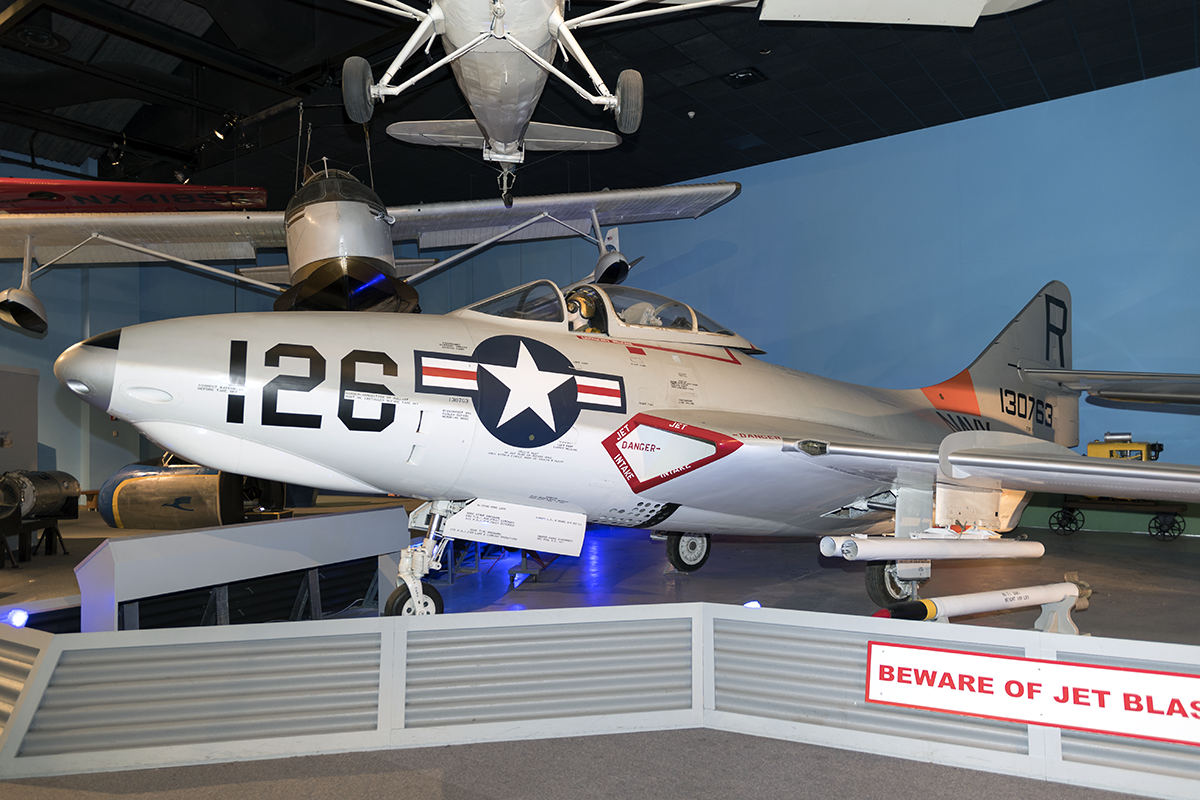
F9F-7 Cougar Bu130763

=== Aircraft ===
Model name	First flight	Number built	Type
Grumman FF	1931	116	Single piston engine naval fighter
Grumman JF Duck	1933	48	Single piston engine floatplane observation airplane
Grumman F2F	1933	55	Single piston engine naval fighter
Grumman F3F	1935	147	Single piston engine naval fighter
Grumman XSBF	1936	1	Prototype single piston engine dive bomber
Grumman J2F Duck	1936	254	Single piston engine floatplane observation airplane
Grumman G-21 Goose	1937	345	Twin piston engine flying boat
Grumman F4F Wildcat	1937	2,605	Single piston engine naval fighter
Grumman G-44 Widgeon	1940	276	Twin piston engine flying boat
Grumman XF5F Skyrocket	1940	1	Prototype twin piston engine naval fighter
Grumman XP-50	1941	1	Prototype twin piston engine fighter
Grumman TBF Avenger	1941	2,290	Single piston engine torpedo bomber
Grumman F6F Hellcat	1942	12,275	Single piston engine naval fighter
Grumman F7F Tigercat	1943	364	Twin piston engine naval fighter
Grumman G-63 Kitten I	1944	1	Prototype single piston engine airplane
Grumman G-72 Kitten II	1944	1	Prototype single piston engine airplane
Grumman F8F Bearcat	1944	1,265	Single piston engine naval fighter
Grumman G-65 Tadpole	1944	1	Prototype single piston engine flying boat
Grumman AF Guardian	1945	389	Single piston engine anti-submarine warfare airplane
Grumman G-73 Mallard	1946	59	Twin piston engine flying boat
Grumman HU-16 Albatross	1947	466	Twin piston engine flying boat
Grumman F9F Panther	1947	1,382	Single jet engine naval fighter
Grumman F9F-6 Cougar	1951	1,988	Single jet engine naval fighter
Grumman XF10F Jaguar	1952	1	Prototype single jet engine naval fighter
Grumman S-2 Tracker	1952	1,184 or 1,185	Twin piston engine anti-submarine warfare airplane
Grumman F11F Tiger	1954	200	Single jet engine naval fighter
Grumman C-1 Trader	1955	87	Twin piston engine cargo airplane
Grumman F11F-1F Super Tiger	1956	1	Prototype single jet engine naval fighter
Grumman E-1 Tracer	1956	88	Twin piston engine airborne early warning airplane
Grumman G-164 Ag Cat	1957	402	Single piston engine agricultural airplane
Grumman G-159 Gulfstream I	1958	200	Twin turboprop engine business airplane
Grumman OV-1 Mohawk	1959	380	Twin turboprop engine observation airplane
Grumman A-6 Intruder	1960	693	Twin jet engine attack airplane
Grumman E-2 Hawkeye	1960	122	Twin turboprop engine airborne early warning airplane
Grumman American AA-1	1963	680+ (Note: Additional aircraft were built before and after Grumman ownership.)	Single piston engine civil airplane
Grumman C-2 Greyhound	1964	56	Twin turboprop engine cargo airplane
General Dynamics–Grumman F-111B	1965	7	Prototype twin jet engine naval fighter
Grumman G-1159 Gulfstream II	1966	256	Twin jet engine business airplane
Grumman EA-6B Prowler	1968	170	Twin jet engine electronic warfare airplane
Grumman American AA-5	1970	>3,057 (Note: Additional aircraft were built after Grumman ownership.)	Single piston engine civil airplane
Grumman F-14 Tomcat	1970	712	Twin jet engine naval fighter
Grumman American GA-7 Cougar	1974	~1 (Note: Although a Grumman American design, most aircraft were built by Gulfstream American.)	Twin piston engine civil airplane
General Dynamics–Grumman EF-111A Raven	1977	42	Twin jet engine electronic warfare airplane
Grumman X-29	1984	2	Experimental single jet engine airplane
Grumman XJL	N/A	0 (Note: Although a Grumman design, all three aircraft were built by Columbia.)	Single piston engine floatplane observation airplane

=== Projects ===
- Grumman 674 Nutcracker tilting fuselage VTOL
- Grumman 698 VTOL
- Grumman G-3 project only
- Grumman G-4 project only
- Grumman G-17 project only
- Grumman G-25 project only
- Grumman G-27 project only
- Grumman G-29 project only
- Grumman G-30 project only
- Grumman G-35 project only
- Grumman G-48 project only
- Grumman G-49 project only
- Grumman G-57 project only
- Grumman G-62 project only
- Grumman G-68 project only
- Grumman G-71 project only
- Grumman G-76 project only
- Grumman G-77 swept-back wing research aircraft project
- Grumman G-78 towed target glider project
- Grumman G-84 project only
- Grumman G-85 project only
- Grumman G-86 project only
- Grumman G-91 project only
- Grumman G-92 project only
- Grumman G-97 project only
- Grumman G-107 project only
- Grumman G-108 project only
- Grumman G-110 project only
- Grumman G-113 project only
- Grumman G-114
- Grumman G-115
- Grumman G-116 project only
- Grumman G-118 project only
- Grumman G-119 project only
- Grumman G-122 project only
- Grumman G-124 jet trainer design
- Grumman G-127
- Grumman G-132
- Grumman XTB2F
- Grumman XTSF

=== Spacecraft ===
- Space
  - Apollo Lunar Module
  - Grumman 619 Space Shuttle

=== Other products ===
- Grumman manufactured fire engines under the name Firecat (not to be confused with the firefighting variant of the Grumman S-2 Tracker, which is sold under the same name) and aerial tower trucks under the Aerialcat name. The company entered the fire apparatus business in 1976 with its purchase of Howe Fire Apparatus.
- Grumman canoes were developed in 1944 as World War II was winding down. Company executive William Hoffman used the company's aircraft aluminum to replace the traditional wood design. The canoes had a reputation for being sturdier, lighter and stronger than their wood counterparts and had a considerable market share. Grumman moved its boat making division to Marathon, New York in 1952.

Outboard Marine Corp. bought the division in 1990 and produced the last Grumman-brand canoe in 1996. Shortly thereafter former Grumman executives formed the Marathon Boat Group to produce the canoes. In 2000 the Group worked out an agreement with Northrop Grumman to sell the canoes using Grumman name and logo.

- Grumman sport boat
- Grumman-Flxible 870 transit buses (1978–1982)
- Ben Franklin (PX-15), a science submarine
- Grumman LLV postal vehicle widely used by the United States Postal Service and Canada Post
- In honor of Grumman's aviation and aerospace inventions, a Grumman Memorial Park was established in Calverton, New York.

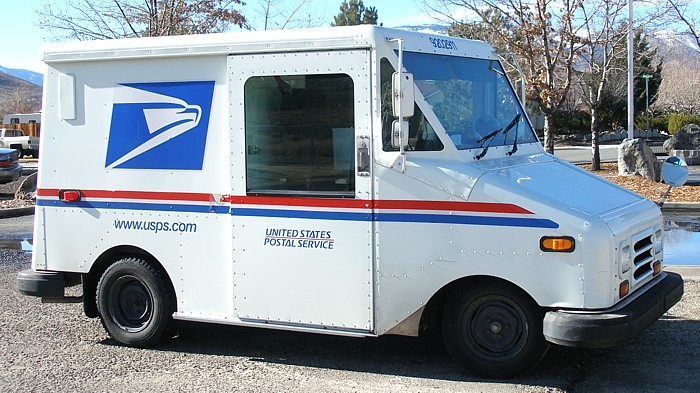
United States Postal Service Grumman LLV

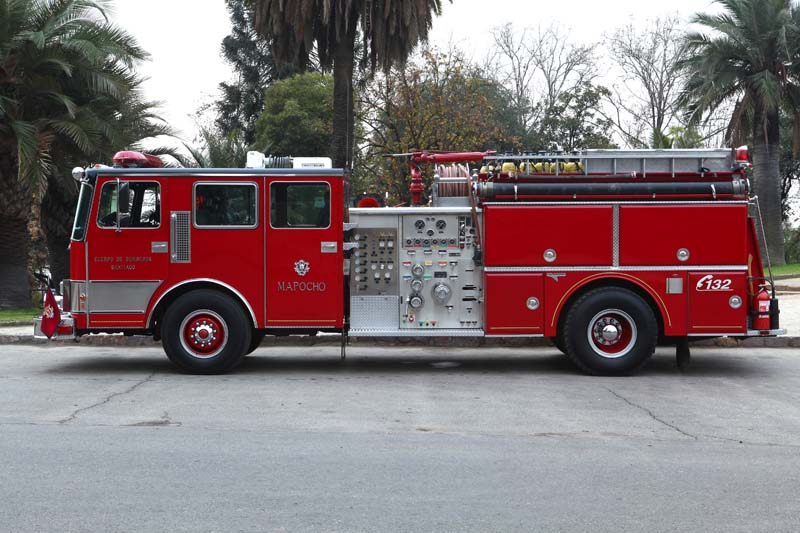
1988 Grumman Firecat, Santiago de Chile FD, 2004

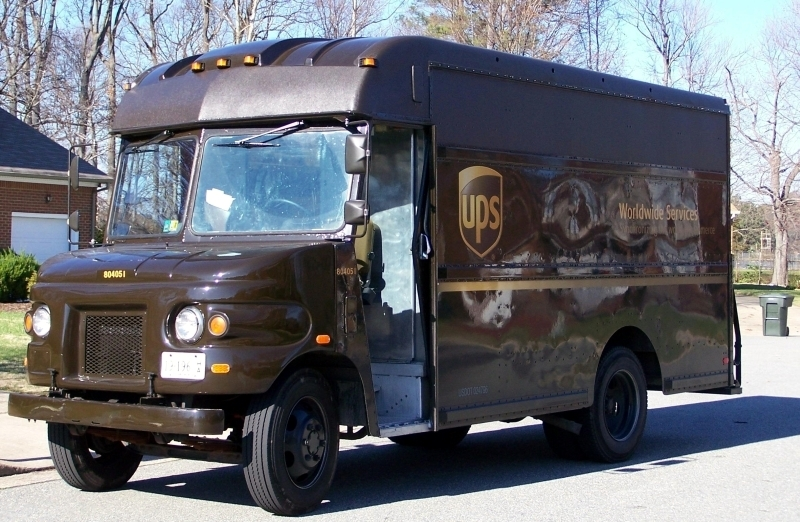
Grumman Olson UPS truck

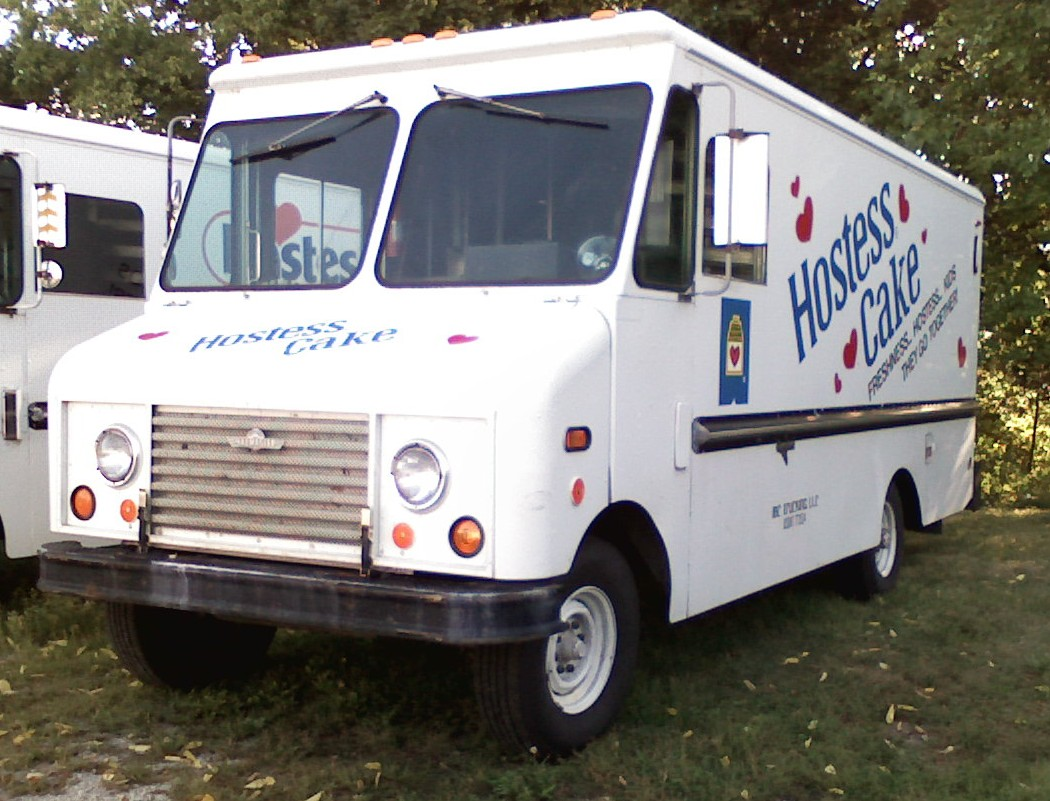
Grumman Kurbmaster Hostess Delivery truck

== Leadership ==
=== President ===
- Leroy Randle Grumman, 1939–1947
- Leon Albert Swirbul, 1947–1960
- Edwin Clinton Towl, 1960–1967
- Llewellyn J. Evans, 1967–1973
- John Cocks Bierwirth, 1973–1976
- Joseph G. Gavin Jr., 1976–1985
- George M. Skurla, 1985–1986
- John O'Brien, 1986–1990

=== Chairman of the Board ===
- Leroy Randle Grumman, 1947–1966
- Edwin Clinton Towl, 1966–1976
- John Cocks Bierwirth, 1976–1988
