= Keystone-Loening Air Yacht =

1920s American amphibious utility aircraft

C-4C, K-85 Air Yacht
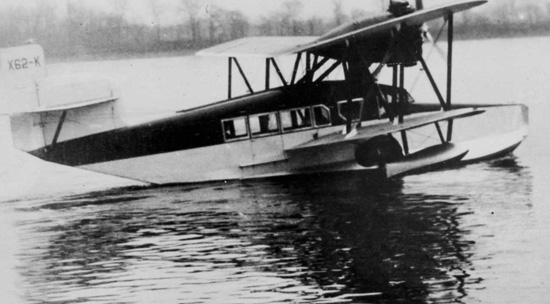

General information
- Type: Utility amphibian
- National origin: United States
- Manufacturer: Loening, Keystone-Loening
- Designer: Grover Loening
- Number built: 4

History
- First flight: 1928

The Loening C-4C, later the Keystone-Loening K-85 Air Yacht following the merger of the Loening and Keystone companies, was an amphibious utility biplane built in the United States in the late 1920s. It was developed by Grover Loening from the C-1 that he had created together with Leroy Grumman, incorporating a new fuselage design. This departed from the characteristic Loening design feature of having a slender, "shoehorn" float projecting from the underside of the fuselage with an engine mounted tractor-fashion above it. Instead, the C-4C had a conventional flying-boat hull, with an enclosed cabin for passengers. The engine was mounted in a separate nacelle on the leading edge of the upper wing.

Two C-4Cs were built in 1928, shortly before the corporate merger. In 1931, Keystone-Loening built two examples of a revised version, but no further production ensued.

Thompson Aeronautical Corporation (TAC), a U.S.-based air carrier, was operating scheduled passenger service between Detroit and Cleveland in 1930 with Keystone–Loening Air Yacht aircraft with six round trip flights a day between the two cities.

== Specifications (K-85 Air Yacht) ==
Data from U.S. Civil Aircraft Vol. 4

General characteristics

- Crew: One pilot
- Capacity: 7 passengers
- Length: 37 ft 2 in (11.33 m)
- Wingspan: 46 ft 8 in (14.22 m)
- Height: 15 ft 9 in (4.80 m) (wheels down)
- Wing area: 517 sq ft (48.0 m^{2})
- Airfoil: Loening 10-1
- Empty weight: 4,209 lb (1,909 kg)
- Gross weight: 6,300 lb (2,858 kg)
- Fuel capacity: 140 US gal (120 imp gal; 530 L)
- Powerplant: 1 × Wright R-1750 Cyclone 9 , 525 hp (391 kW)

Performance

- Maximum speed: 138 mph (222 km/h, 120 kn)
- Cruise speed: 107 mph (172 km/h, 93 kn)
- Range: 500 mi (800 km, 430 nmi)
- Service ceiling: 13,800 ft (4,200 m)
- Rate of climb: 800 ft/min (4.1 m/s)
