= Grumman FF =

US Navy biplane

FF / SF "Fifi"
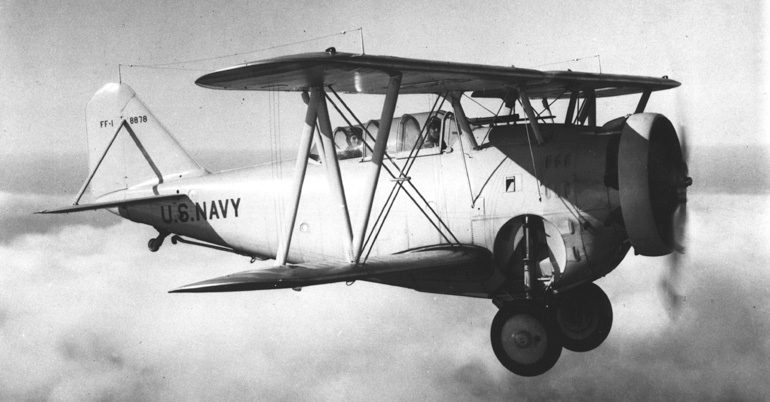

General information
- Type: Naval fighter
- Manufacturer: Grumman
- Designer: Leroy Grumman
- Primary users: United States Navy Spanish Republican Air Force; Royal Canadian Air Force
- Number built: 116

History
- Manufactured: 1932–1934
- Introduction date: June 1933
- First flight: 29 December 1931
- Retired: 1940
- Developed into: Grumman XSBF

The Grumman FF "Fifi" (company designation G-5) is an American biplane fighter aircraft operated by the United States Navy during the 1930s. It was the first carrier aircraft with retractable landing gear. It was produced under license in Canada and known as the Goblin in Canadian service and Delfín (English: "Dolphin") in Spanish service.

== Design and development ==
The FF-1 was Grumman’s first complete aircraft design for the US Navy. The Navy had asked Grumman if their retractable landing gear made for the O2U-1 Scout planes could be retrofitted to the Navy's Boeing F4B-1 fighters; instead Grumman proposed a new fighter design. The prototype XFF-1 (serial number A8878) was built at Curtiss Field (later named Columbia Field), New York to a contract placed on 22 April 1931, first flying on 29 December of that year. The airplane was of two-seat design, with an enclosed cockpit, fuselage of all-metal construction, and wings covered largely with fabric. The XFF-1 was powered initially by a 616 hp (459 kW) Wright R-1820-E Cyclone radial engine, it achieved 195 mph (314 km/h) during service trials. Later the original engine was exchanged for a 750 hp (560 kW) Wright R-1820-F Cyclone and the XFF-1 reached a top speed of 201 mph (323 km/h), faster than any US Navy fighter in service at the time.

A production order was placed for 27 two-seat FF-1 (G-5) on 19 December 1932. Meanwhile, Grumman had completed a second prototype (serial number A8940) to a two-seat scout configuration as the XSF-1 (G-6). Subsequently, 33 production SF-1s were ordered based on the two-seat configuration. They differed from the FF-1 principally in having revised internal equipment and in being powered by R-1820-84 Cyclones instead of the R-1820-78 model installed in the fighter version. One XSF-2 was also completed, this having a Pratt & Whitney R-1535-72 two-row engine in place of the Cyclone.

The distinctive retractable main landing gear design for the FF-1 had originated with Grover Loening's employment of Grumman's future founder, Leroy Grumman, who had hired both Grumman and Jake Swirbul to work in his own aircraft firm in 1928 – after the Loening Aeronautical Engineering Company folded in the 1932–33 timeframe, Loening in turn contributed to the Grumman firm's later successes, with the Grumman-designed, manual crank-operated retractable main gear design used for a number of Loening's military aircraft designs being used on the FF-1, and later Grumman F2F and F3F follow-on biplane fighter designs; culminating in the Grumman F4F Wildcat also using it, as well as the amphibious single-engined Grumman JF and J2F Duck multi-use biplane military aircraft.

== Operational history ==
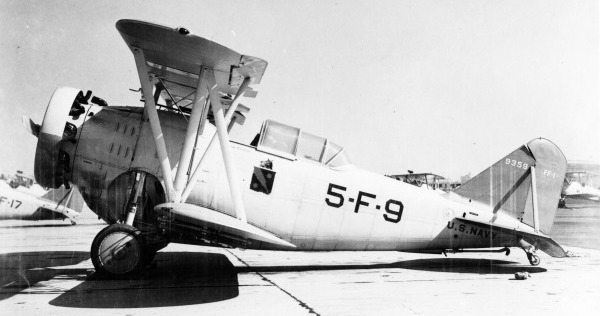
Grumman FF-1 of U.S Navy Squadron VF-5B

FF-1s were delivered to Fighter Squadron VF-5B of the USS Lexington beginning in June 1933. In service the FF-1 became familiarly known as the "Fifi". Delivery of SF-1s started on 30 March 1934, and they also served aboard the Lexington, with Scout Squadron VS-3B.

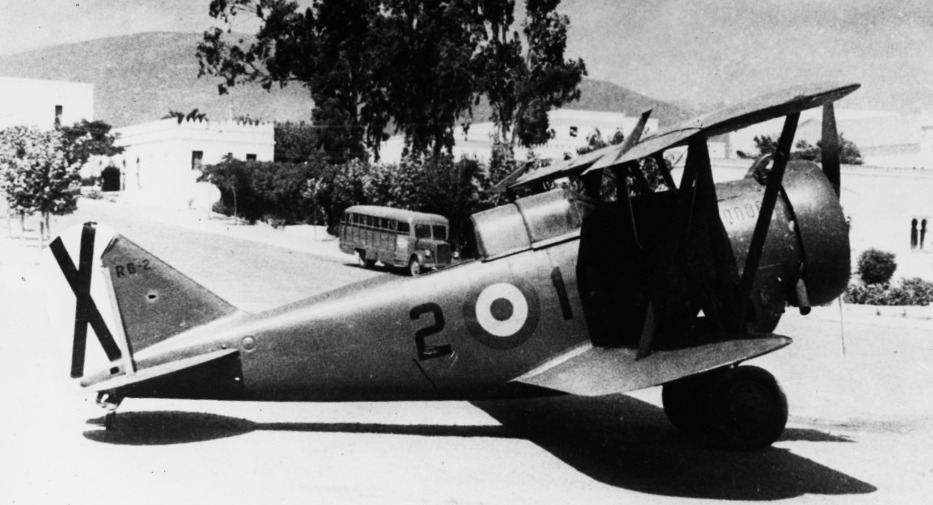
Post-war Spanish GE-23 Delfin "Pedro Rico"

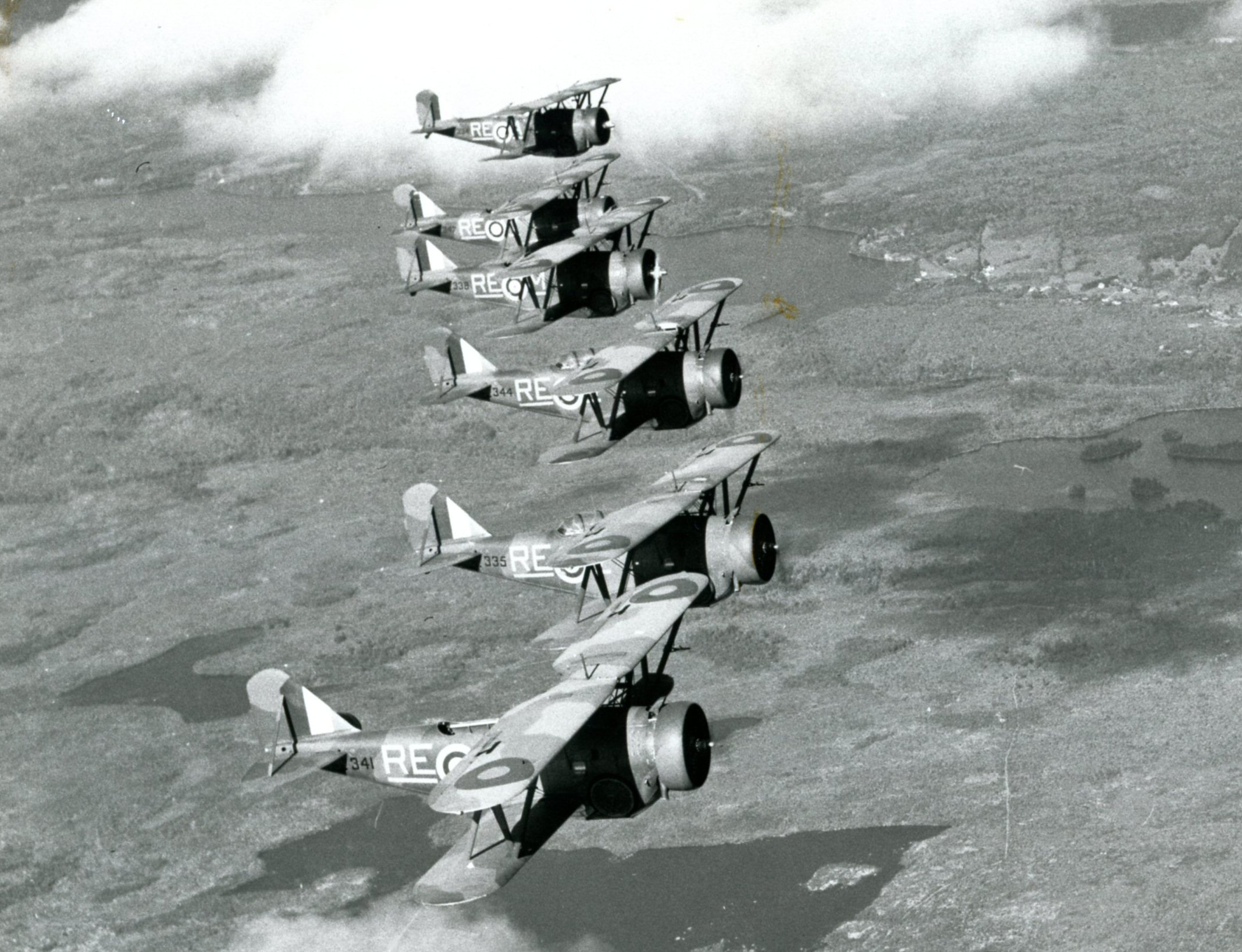
Grumman Goblins of 118 Sqn RCAF near Dartmouth N.S. in 1941

Both the FF-1 and SF-1 were withdrawn from first-line US Navy squadrons in late 1935 and 1936. The 25 remaining FF-1s were sent to the Naval Aircraft Factory in Philadelphia where they were modified and redesignated FF-2s. The FF-2s had their upper cowling guns removed and replaced by a single .30-cal machine gun in the starboard side of the fuselage in the same configuration as the SF-1. They were flown by Naval Reserve Air Bases activities across the United States. SF-1s were also used by the Naval Reserve. The last FF-2 was stricken from the Naval Record in 1942.

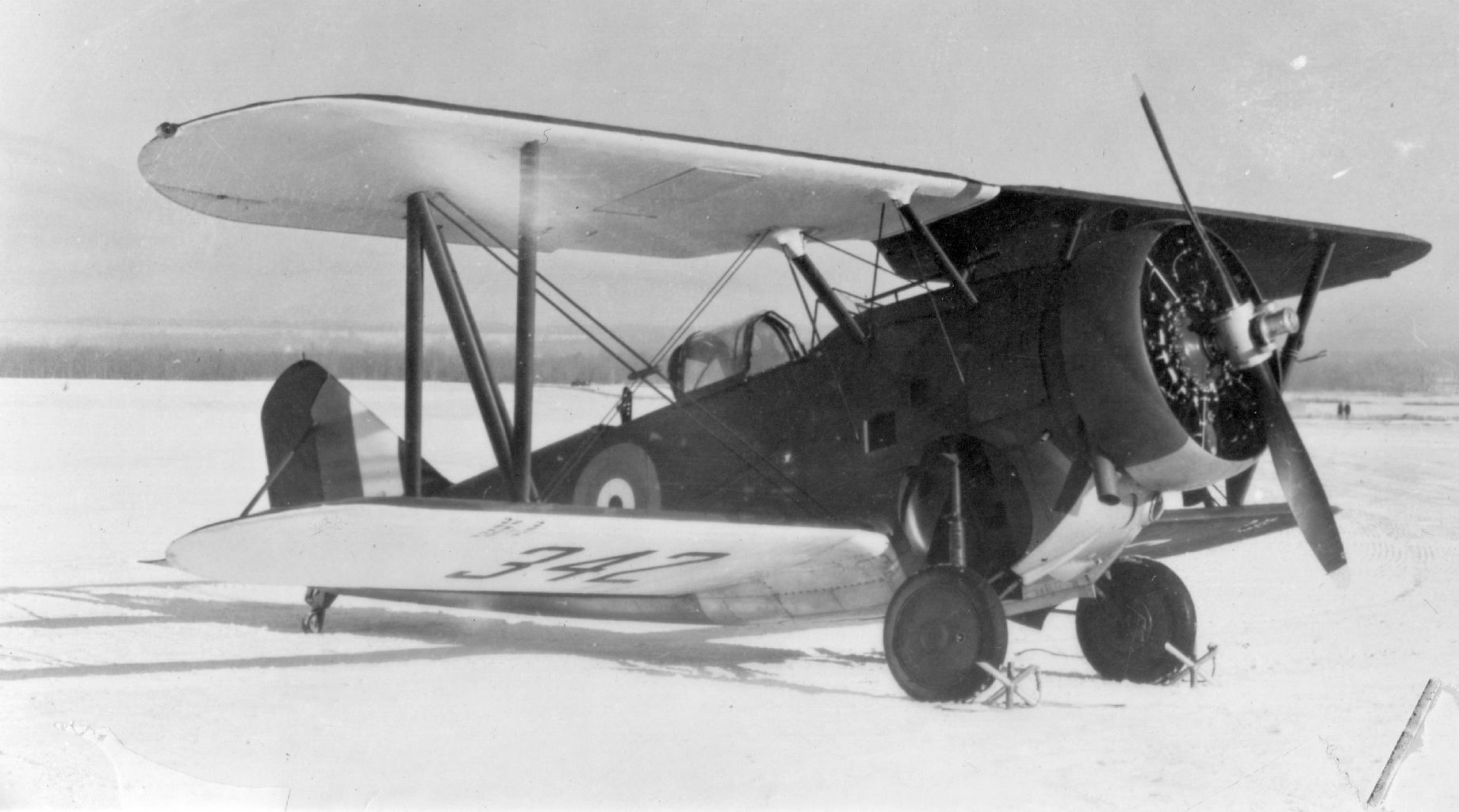
Royal Canadian Air Force Canadian Car and Foundry Goblin I circa 1941

The Canadian Car and Foundry Co acquired a manufacturing license for the G-23, an improved FF-1, of which it completed a total of 52, some of which were assembled from US-built components. Thirty-four were acquired by the Spanish Republican government in 1937 by presenting forged Turkish credentials. This batch was built primarily to bypass the US embargo placed on belligerents during the Spanish Civil War. Referred to as the GE-23 Delfin (en:'Dolphin') by the Spanish Republican Air Force, the aircraft fought in the conflict, but were outclassed by opposing fighters and losses were high. A victory against a Heinkel He 59B was the only recorded "kill" by a Grumman biplane fighter. Eleven survived to serve in the Ejército del Aire Español, nicknamed Pedro Rico for its rotundity.

Although initially rejected as a fighter by the Royal Canadian Air Force as outdated and too slow, with the advent of war, the last 15 of the CC&F production batch were taken on strength as Goblin Is. The aircraft type served with the RCAF from 17 September 1940 until 21 April 1942. "A" Flight of No. 118 RCAF Sqn was equipped with Goblins at Rockcliffe in Ottawa, and subsequently became No. 118 (Fighter) Sqn., later stationed at Dartmouth, Nova Scotia, where the Goblins for a time constituted the sole fighter force on the east coast.

Prior to RCAF use, single examples were delivered to Nicaragua, Japan, and Mexico.

The sole G-23 purchased by the Nicaraguan government saw limited service before being relegated to a scrap yard at Zololtan Air Field in 1942, destined to remain there until 1961 when it was purchased and shipped to the US. In 1966, Grumman restored the aircraft before passing it to the US Navy where it remains as one of the displays at the Naval Aviation Museum at Pensacola, Florida.

The Japanese example was purchased as an example of Grumman's undercarriage. However, by the time it was delivered, better designs were already in use.

The Mexican example was intended to be a pattern aircraft to allow a production line to be set up there, but this never occurred.

== Variants ==
XFF-1 (Grumman Model G-5)
Single prototype, serial number A8878
FF-1
27 built, two-seat U.S. Navy carrier-borne fighter
FF-2
25 of the original FF-1 fighters converted by the Naval Aircraft Factory with dual controls to serve as fighter trainers
XSF-1 (Grumman Model G-6)
One built, second prototype, serial number A8940
SF-1
33 built, two-seat U.S. Navy carrier-borne scout
XSF-2 (Grumman Model G-13)
One aircraft, an SF-1 airframe with the 650 hp (485 kW) Pratt & Whitney R-1535-72 Twin Wasp Junior engine driving a Hamilton Standard propeller.
GG-1
Single company demonstrator built from FF-1 and SF-1 components. Powered by a 450 horsepower (340 kW) Pratt & Whitney R-1340 Wasp. Later modified with a 890 horsepower (660 kW) Wright R-1820-F52, full span split flaps on the lower surface of the top wing and ailerons on the bottom wing and sold American businessman Howard F. Klein as a demonstrator to the Canadian Car & Foundry Company.
Goblin Mk.1
15 G-23s built under license by the Canadian Car & Foundry Company, but not delivered to the Spanish Republicans. Later taken on strength with the RCAF .
AXG1
A single Grumman G-23 supplied to the Imperial Japanese Navy Air Service for evaluation in 1935.
GE.23 Delfin
Designation for the 34 G-23s delivered to the Spanish Republicans in 1938. 34-delivered.

== Operators ==
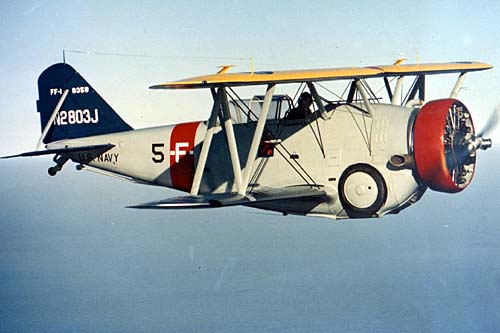
ex-Nicaraguan CC&F Grumman G-23 restored and painted to represent a U.S. Navy FF-1.

Canada
Royal Canadian Air Force

No. 118 (Fighter) Squadron RCAF – 15 aircraft, designated Goblin I
No. 123 (Army-Co-operation) Squadron RCAF – 5 aircraft (transferred from 118 (F) Sqn, designated Goblin I

Japan
Imperial Japanese Navy – one CC&F example designated AXG
Mexico
Mexican Air Force – one intended as pattern for production in Mexico.
Nicaragua
Military Aviation Corps – 1 example, serial GN-3
(Spain) Spanish Republic
Spanish Republican Air Force – 34 aircraft delivered serials AD-001 to AD-034
Ejército del Aire – 11 examples that survived the civil war.
United States
United States Navy

== Specifications (FF-1) ==
Data from The Complete Encyclopedia of World Aircraft and American Combat Planes

General characteristics

- Crew: two (pilot and observer/gunner)
- Length: 24 ft 6 in (7.47 m)
- Wingspan: 34 ft 6 in (10.52 m)
- Height: 11 ft 1 in (3.38 m)
- Wing area: 310 sq ft (28.8 m^{2})
- Empty weight: 3,098 lb (1,405 kg)
- Max takeoff weight: 4,677 lb (2,121 kg)
- Powerplant: 1 × Wright R-1820-78 Cyclone radial engine, 700 hp (520 kW)

Performance

- Maximum speed: 207 mph (333 km/h, 180 kn) at 4,000 ft (1200 m)
- Range: 685 mi (1,100 km, 595 nmi)
- Service ceiling: 22,100 ft (6,735 m)
- Rate of climb: 1,667 ft/min (8.47 m/s)

Armament

- 2× 0.30 in (7.62 mm) M1919 Browning machine guns or 1x 0.30 in and 1x 0.5 in (12.7mm) Browning M2 fixed in fuselage; 1x 0.30 in flex in rear cockpit
- 2× 100 lb (45 kg) M30 or 116 lb (53 kg) Mk4 bombs under wings

== See also ==
Related development

- Grumman F2F
- Grumman XSBF

Related lists

- List of aircraft of Canada's air forces
- List of aircraft of the Spanish Republican Air Force
- List of aircraft of World War II
- List of United States Navy aircraft designations (pre-1962)
