= Loening Air Yacht =

Loening Air Yacht may refer to:

- Loening Model 23 (1921), the original Air Yacht
- Loening C-2 (1928)
- Loening C-4 (1928), later marketed by Keystone-Loening as the K-85

== See also ==
- Loening
