= Loening XS2L =

Amphibious aircraft developed for the United States Navy

XS2L-1
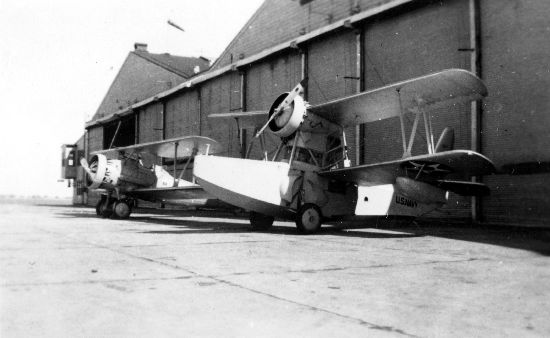
- Loening XS2L-1 in the foreground with Vought SU in the background

General information
- Type: Scout amphibian
- Manufacturer: Keystone-Loening
- Primary user: United States Navy
- Number built: 1
- Serial: A8971

History
- First flight: February 1933

The Loening XS2L was an American biplane scout amphibian developed by Keystone-Loening (then a subsidiary of Curtiss-Wright), for the United States Navy during the early 1930s.

== Design and development ==
In the early 1930s the Navy became interested in exploring amphibious capabilities for its cruiser-based observation and scout floatplanes to remedy the problem of periodically having to rig the wheeled undercarriage and then revert to floats. After some experiments, installing retractable landing gear into the existing types' floats was ruled out due to degradation in performance. A purpose-built amphibian, however, was viewed as a potentially better solution.

Three companies – Great Lakes, Keystone-Loening and Sikorsky - submitted aircraft to meet the Navy's requirements, with their designs designated XSG-1, XS2L-1 and XSS-1 respectively. The Loening's entry was a conventional biplane that featured flying boat hull, retractable main landing gear and a single R-985 Wasp Junior engine in a nacelle on the upper wing. The pilot and observer were seated in an enclosed cockpit that also encompassed some of the interplane struts, resulting in a curiously shaped glazing area.

The XS2L-1 was delivered for official trials in February 1933. Although it showed marginally better performance than its rivals, it still offered no considerable advantages over the existing floatplanes like the Vought O3U-3 and Berliner-Joyce OJ-2, and no production resulted.

== Operators ==
United States

- United States Navy

== Specifications (XS2L-1) ==
Data from

General characteristics

- Crew: 2 (pilot and observer)
- Length: 30 ft 7 in (9.32 m)
- Wingspan: 34 ft 6 in (10.52 m)
- Height: 13 ft (4.0 m)
- Wing area: 355 sq ft (33.0 m^{2})
- Empty weight: 2,833 lb (1,285 kg)
- Gross weight: 4,317 lb (1,958 kg)
- Powerplant: 1 × Pratt & Whitney R-985 radial engine, 400 hp (300 kW)

Performance

- Maximum speed: 130 mph (210 km/h, 110 kn)
- Range: 633 mi (1,019 km, 550 nmi)
- Service ceiling: 12,400 ft (3,800 m)

Armament

- Guns: 1× flexibly mounted .30 in machine gun in the observer's position

== See also ==
Aircraft of comparable role, configuration, and era

- Great Lakes XSG
- Grumman JF Duck
- Sikorsky XSS
- Supermarine Walrus

Related lists

- List of United States Navy aircraft designations (pre-1962)
- List of flying boats and floatplanes
