= Loening PA-1 =

PA-1
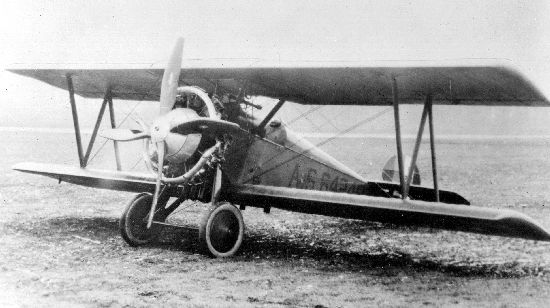

General information
- Type: Fighter
- National origin: United States
- Manufacturer: Loening Aeronautical Engineering
- Designer: Leroy Grumman, Leon Swirbul, William Schwendler
- Number built: 1

History
- First flight: March 1922

The Loening PA-1 (Pursuit-Air cooled) was an American fighter aircraft prototype built by Loening Aeronautical Engineering.

== Development ==
The PA-1 was a single-seat biplane with N-struts powered by a Wright R-1454 radial engine, an all-wood fuselage and wings with fabric coverings. The USAAS ordered two prototypes. The sole prototype first flew in March 1922, was found to have poor performance, so the construction of the second prototype was cancelled.

== Specifications ==
Data from Angelucci, 1987. p. 292.

General characteristics

- Crew: 1
- Length: 19 ft 9 in (6.01 m)
- Wingspan: 28 ft 0 in (8.53 m)
- Height: 8 ft 8 in (2.64 m)
- Wing area: 282 sq ft (26.19 m^{2})
- Empty weight: 1,536 lb (697 kg)
- Gross weight: 2,463 lb (1,117 kg)
- Powerplant: 1 × Wright R-1454 (R-1) , 350 hp (260 kW)

Performance

- Maximum speed: 130 mph (209 km/h, 110 kn)
- Service ceiling: 19,200 ft (5,852 m)
- Rate of climb: 928 ft/min (4.72 m/s)

Armament

- 1 × .50 in (12.7 mm) machine gun
- 300 lb (140 kg) bombs
