= Loening C-1 =

1920s American aircraft

C-1 Air Yacht
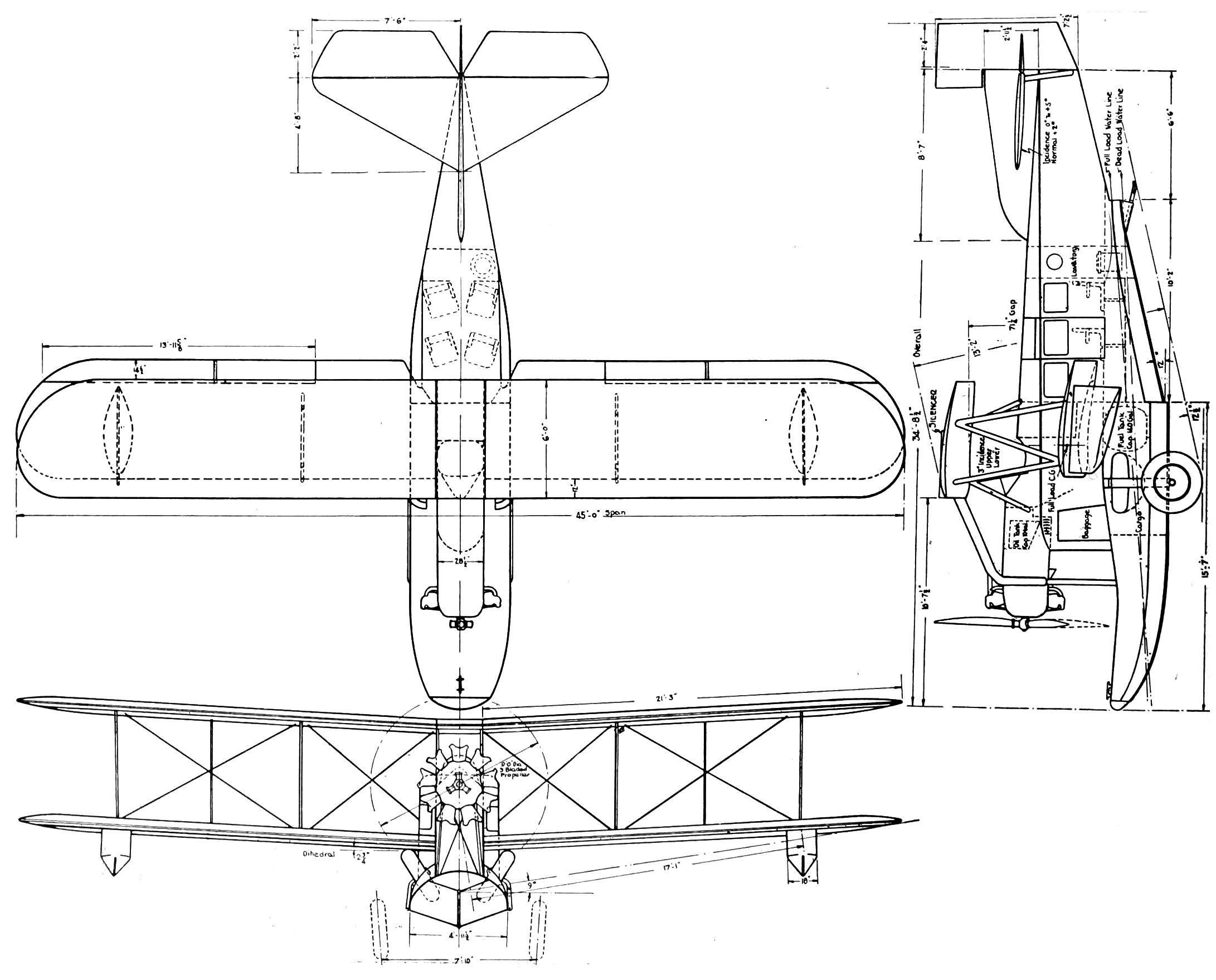
- A Loening C-1W amphibian 3-view

General information
- Type: Amphibious airliner
- National origin: United States
- Manufacturer: Loening
- Number built: 8

History
- First flight: 1928
- Variant: Loening C-2

The Loening C-1 Air Yacht was an amphibious airliner produced in the United States at the end of the 1920s.

== Design ==
The Loening C-1 was based on the OL observation aircraft being developed from the United States Navy (USN). It was a two-bay biplane of unconventional design, with a tall, narrow fuselage that nearly filled the interplane gap. The pilot (and sometimes one passenger) sat in an open cockpit at the top of the fuselage, with the engine mounted in front of them. Underneath the fuselage was a long "shoehorn"-style float, that extended forward underneath the engine and propeller. Four to six passengers could be accommodated in a fully enclosed cabin within the fuselage. The main units of the undercarriage retracted into wells in the sides of the fuselage. Stabilising floats were fitted against the undersides of the lower wing. Eight C-1Ws were built, and the type was further developed into the C-2.

== Specifications (C-1W) ==
Data from

General characteristics

- Crew: 1
- Capacity: 7 pax
- Length: 34 ft 8 in (10.57 m)
- Wingspan: 45 ft 8 in (13.92 m)
- Wing area: 504 sq ft (46.8 m^{2})
- Gross weight: 5,800 lb (2,631 kg)
- Powerplant: 1 × Pratt & Whitney R-1340 Wasp 9-cylinder air-cooled radial piston engine, 410 hp (310 kW)

Performance

- Maximum speed: 120 mph (190 km/h, 100 kn)
- Service ceiling: 14,000 ft (4,300 m)
