= Zvirbulis =

Zvirbulis (masculine), Zvirbule (feminine) is a Latvian surname. Notable people with the surname include:

- Armands Zvirbulis (born 1987), Latvian wrestler
- Armands Zvirbulis (filmmaker) (born 1972), Latvian TV and film director and screenwriter
- Elise Zvirbulis (born 1991), former American triathlete and beach handball player
- Miks Zvirbulis (born 1937), Latvian filmmaker

== See also ==
- Jake Swirbul, cofounder of Grumman Aircraft, was born to the family of Latvian immigrants, Frederiks Zvirbulis and Lena Zvirbule
