= PA1 =

PA1 or PA-1 may refer to:

- Pad Abort Test 1, a 1963 Apollo test flight
- Pad Abort 1 (Orion), a 2010 Orion test flight
- Pennsylvania's 1st congressional district
- Pennsylvania state route 1, a former state highway near Philadelphia
- U.S. Route 1 in Pennsylvania
- Muhammed Akbar Khan, Pakistan Army general
- ALCO PA, train locomotive
- The PA1, a type of rolling stock used on the PATH train in New York and New Jersey
- PA-1 (cell line), a human ovarian cancer cell line
- PA1 key, on the IBM 3270 keyboard
- Loening PA-1, American fighter aircraft prototype
