= Loening OL =

1923 reconnaissance floatplane family

OL
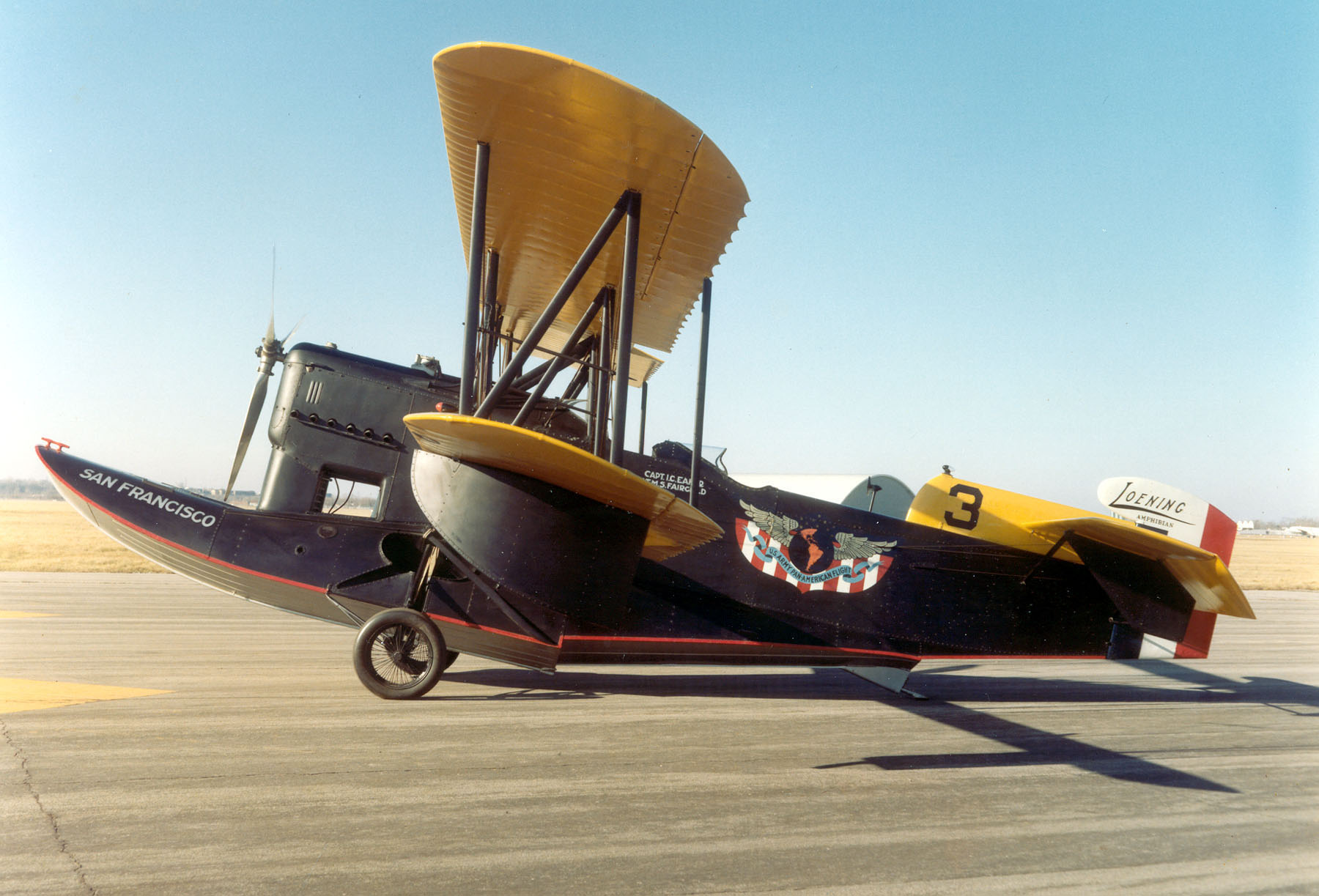
- OA-1A San Francisco (26-431) of the U.S. Army Pan American Flight

General information
- Type: Amphibious observation aircraft
- Manufacturer: Loening
- Designer: Grover Loening
- Primary users: United States Navy United States Army Air Corps
- Number built: 165

History
- First flight: 1923

The Loening OL, also known as the Loening Amphibian, is an American two-seat amphibious biplane designed by Grover Loening and built by Loening for the United States Army Air Corps and the United States Navy.

== Design and development ==
First flown in 1923, the OL was a high-performance amphibian with a large single hull and stabilizing floats fitted underneath each lower wing. The landing gear was retractable by use of a hand crank in the cockpit, and the plane was equipped with a tailskid for operations on land. It had a tandem open cockpit for a crew of two. The aircraft could be flown from either cockpit, with a wheel control in the forward cockpit and a removable stick control in the rear. Navigation and engine instruments were located in the forward cockpit.

The hull was built of Duralumin on a wooden frame, with five watertight compartments connected through a selector switch to a bilge pump in the rear cockpit. Plugs in the bottom of each compartment permitted drainage on the ground. The fuselage was constructed on top of the hull. The aircraft was strength-tested at Columbia University.

The United States Army Air Corps ordered four prototypes as the XCOA-1, powered by a 400-hp Liberty V-1650-1 engine mounted inverted for clearance of the three-bladed variable-pitch steel propeller. The engine came with a fire suppression sprinkler system and was encased in a streamlined cowling to protect it from sea spray. Oil from a tank in the fuselage was cooled by passing through a spiral copper tube exposed to the slipstream on top of the cowling. The fuel tanks were mounted inside the hull, with a 140-gallon (530-liter) gasoline tank under the wings, and a reserve 60-gallon (230-liter) gasoline-benzol tank between the cockpits. Total fuel capacity provided for roughly ten hours of flight.

A number of variants were introduced for both the Army and the Navy. During later production, the company merged with the Keystone Aircraft Corporation.

== Variants ==
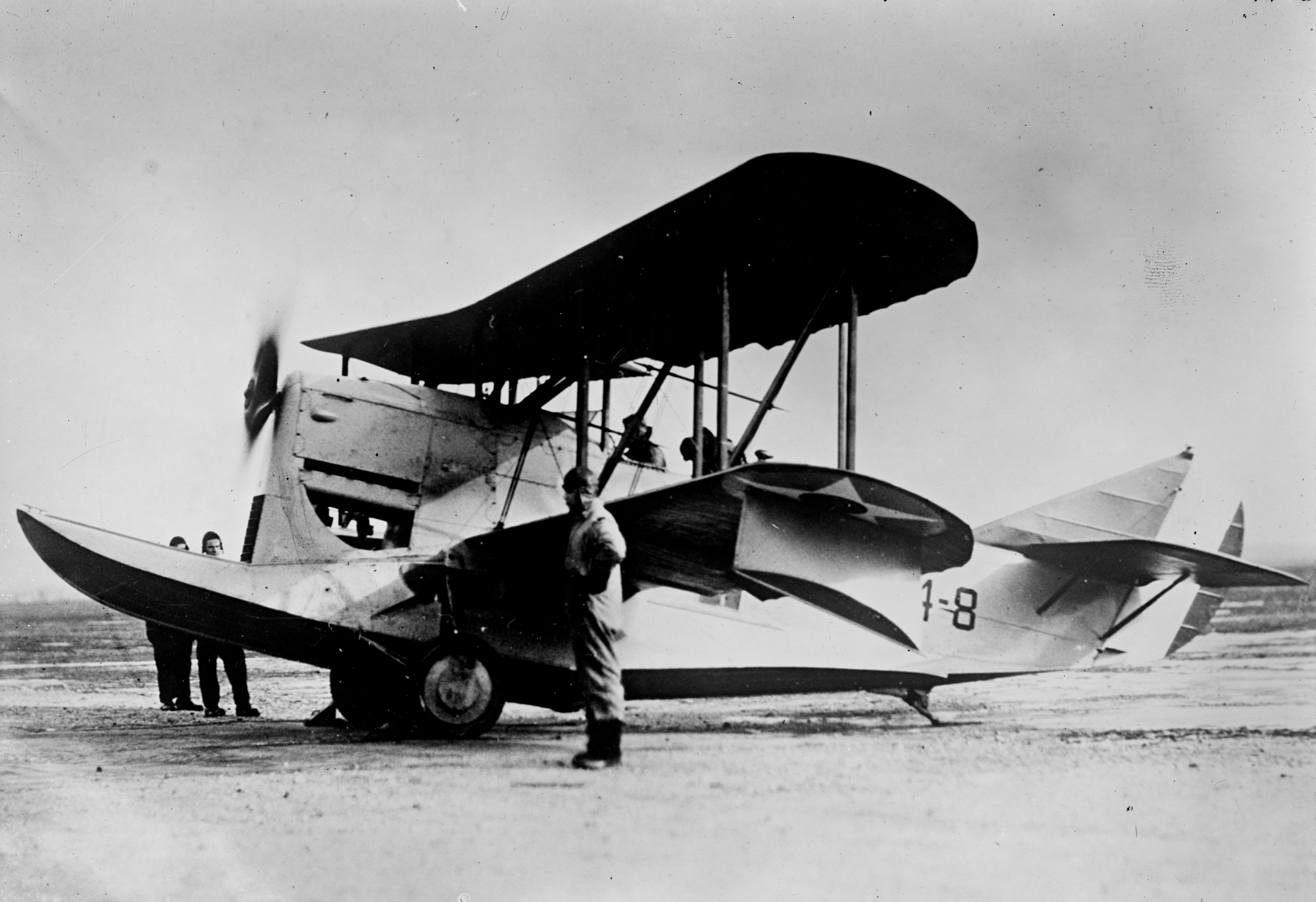
U.S. Navy Loening OL-1A

XCOA-1
Four prototypes powered by 400-hp V-1650-1 engines, three later to COA-1
COA-1
Three prototypes and nine production aircraft for the Army Air Service
OA-1A
Army production aircraft with redesigned vertical tail and powered by a 420-hp, water-cooled Liberty V-12 engine that was mounted inverted, 15 built.
XOA-1A
One prototype with a single retractable mainwheel and skids fitted to wing floats, powered by an inverted V-12 Wright Typhoon, redesignated XO-10 before delivery in 1929
OA-1B
Same as an OA-1A with a water-cooled V-1650-1 engine, nine built
OA-1C
OA-1B with redesigned fin and rudder, ten built
OA-2
OA-1C with 480hp Wright IV-1460-1 engine modified tail surfaces and forward-firing machine gun moved to port upper wing, eight built
XO-10
One XOA-1A redesignated before delivery by the U.S. Army
OL-1
Naval version with third cockpit, two prototypes powered by a 440-hp Packard 1A-1500, with different tails.
OL-2
Naval version similar to the COA-1, five built
OL-3
OL-1 powered by a 475-hp Packard 1A-1500 and other detail changes, four built
OL-4
OL-3 powered by a 400-hp V-1650-2 engine, six built
OL-5
Three of these were built for the U.S. Coast Guard in 1926.
OL-6
OL-3 with a redesigned square vertical tail as OA-1C, 28 built
XOL-7
One OL-6 fitted with experimental thicker wing
XOL-8
One OL-6 re-engined with an air-cooled 450-hp Pratt & Whitney R-1340-2 radial engine
OL-8
As XOL-8 with two cockpits and a 450-hp R-1340-4 engine, 20 built
OL-8A
An OL-8 fitted with arrestor gear, 20 built
OL-9
An OL-9 with equipment changes, 26 built
XO-37
A development of the OA-2 with a 200-hp R-1340-0 engine, project cancelled

== Operators ==
United States

- United States Army Air Corps
- United States Coast Guard
- United States Navy

== Surviving aircraft ==
The Loening OA-1A "San Francisco" is on display at the Steven F. Udvar-Hazy Center of the National Air and Space Museum in Chantilly, Virginia. The San Francisco took part in the 1926-1927 Pan-American Goodwill Flight through Mexico, Central, and South America. It was donated to the Smithsonian Institution in 1927 and restored in 1964-1965. It was previously on loan to the National Museum of the United States Air Force in Dayton, Ohio from 1977 to 2006.

== Specifications (OL-9) ==
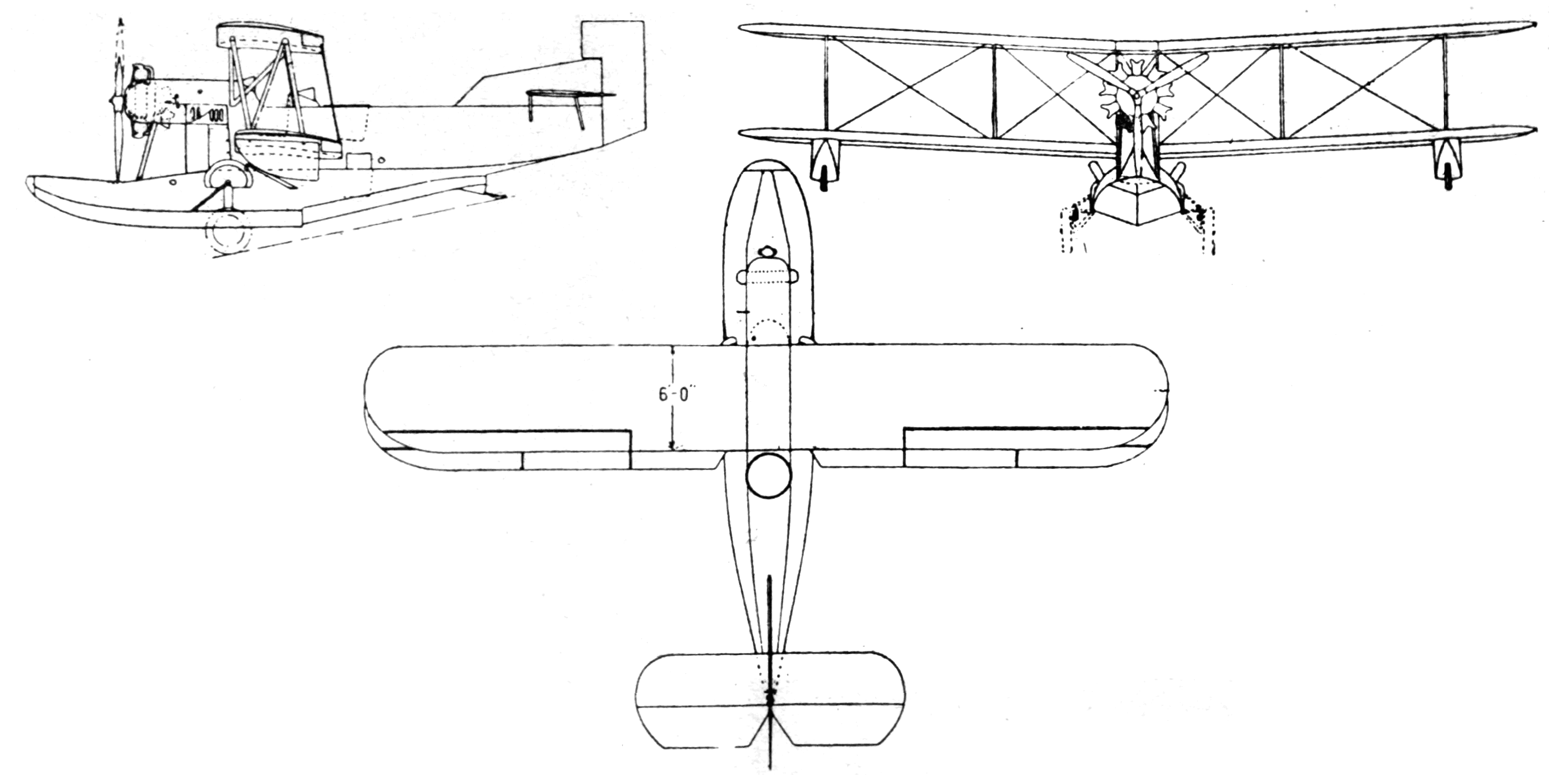
Loening OL-8 3-view drawing from L'Air January 15, 1928

Data from The Illustrated Encyclopedia of Aircraft (Part Work 1982-1985), 1985, Orbis Publishing, Page 2376

General characteristics

- Crew: two
- Length: 34 ft 9 in (10.59 m)
- Wingspan: 45 ft 0 in (13.72 m)
- Height: 12 ft 9 in (3.89 m)
- Wing area: 504 sq ft (46.82 m^{2})
- Empty weight: 3,649 lb (1,655 kg)
- Gross weight: 5,404 lb (2,451 kg)
- Powerplant: 1 × Pratt & Whitney R-1340-4 Wasp air-cooled radial piston engine , 450 hp (336 kW)

Performance

- Maximum speed: 122 mph (196 km/h, 106 kn)
- Range: 625 mi (1,006 km, 543 nmi)
- Service ceiling: 14,300 ft (4,360 m)

== See also ==
Related development

- Loening C-2

Aircraft of comparable role, configuration, and era

- JF Duck
- J2F Duck

Related lists

- List of seaplanes and flying boats
- List of military aircraft of the United States
- List of United States Navy aircraft designations (pre-1962)
