= Loening PW-2 =

PW-2
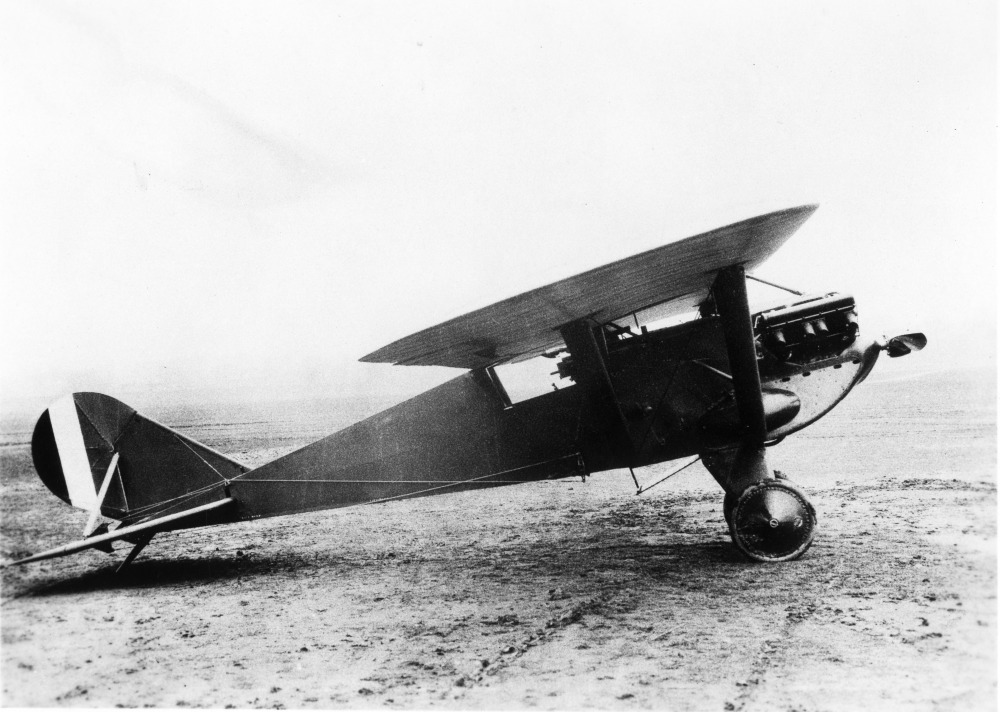
- Third PW-2 prototype after modification with a single vertical tail

General information
- Type: Monoplane fighter
- National origin: United States
- Manufacturer: Loening Aeronautical Engineering
- Designer: Grover Loening
- Primary user: United States Army Air Corps
- Number built: 7

History
- First flight: 1920
- Developed from: Loening M-8

The Loening PW-2 was a 1920s American single-seat monoplane fighter designed by Grover Loening and built by his Loening Aeronautical Engineering Company.

== Development ==
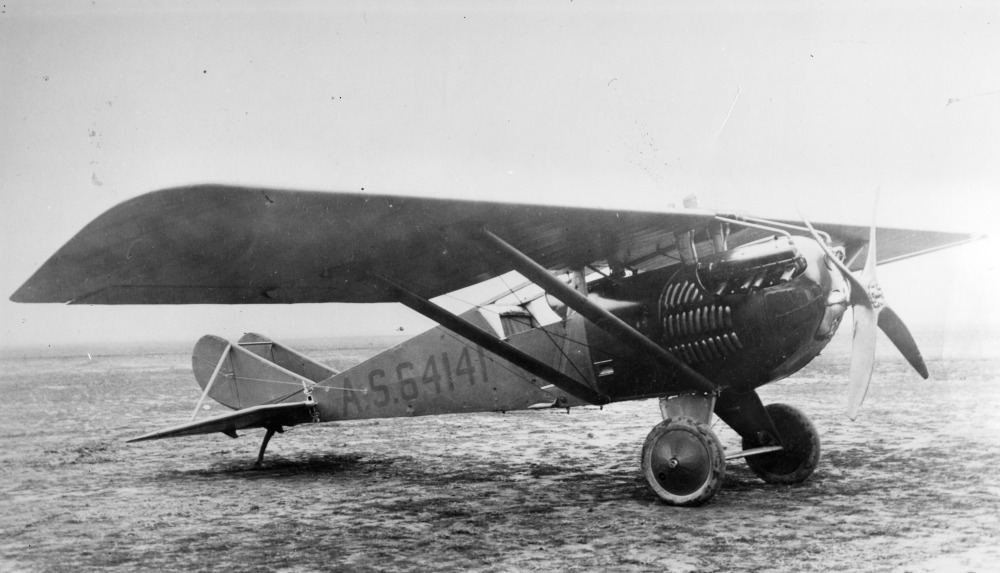
Third PW-2 prototype with its original twin tail

Based on the earlier two-seat braced-wing monoplane fighter, the M-8, the PW-2 was a single-seat variant for the United States Army Air Corps. It had a fixed tailskid landing gear and was powered by a nose-mounted Wright-Hispano H engine with a tractor propeller. The pilot had an open cockpit. The company built three prototypes designated the PW-2 and a production order for 10 aircraft designated the PW-2A followed. The PW-2As were similar to the PW-2 but had a revised tail unit. After four aircraft had been delivered, one aircraft crashed when the wings separated from the aircraft; the contract was canceled. One of the PW-2As was modified with shorter-span wings and a 350 hp (260 kW) Packard 1A-1237 engine as the PW-2B.

== Variants ==
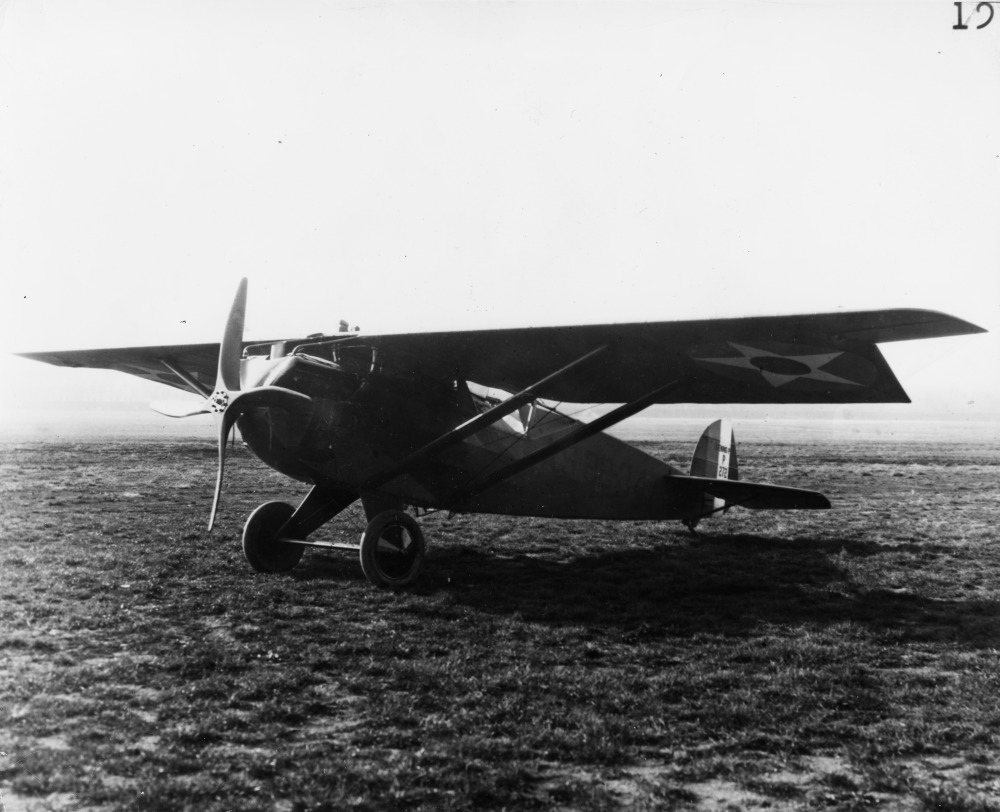
PW-2A

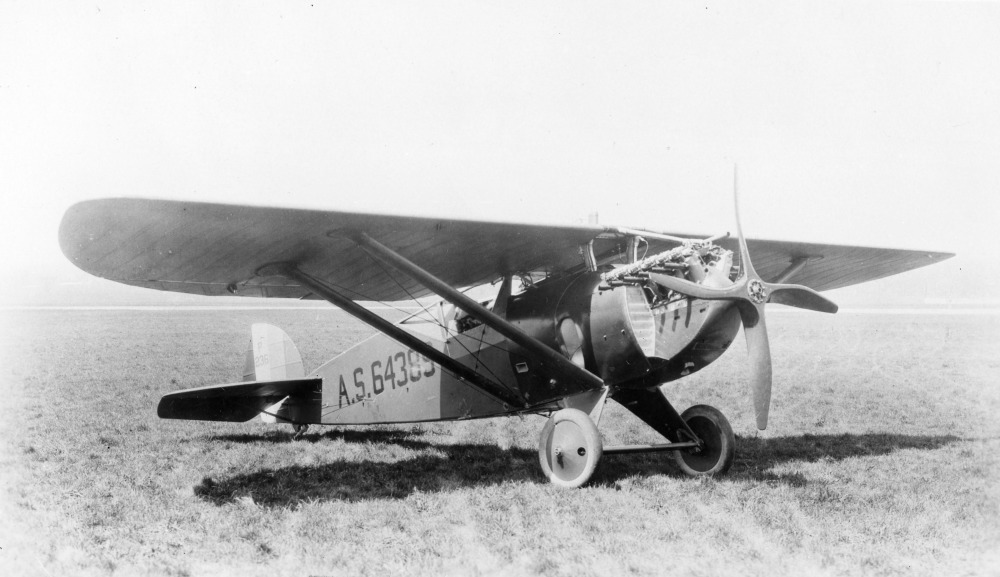
PW-2B

PW-2
Prototype, three built one of which had twin rudders and was not flown and used for static testing.
PW-2A
Production variant with revised tail unit, four built and six cancelled.
PW-2B
PW-2A variant with shorter span wings and a 350hp (261kW) Packard 1A-1237

== Operators ==
United States
United States Army Air Corps

== Specifications (PW-2A) ==
Data from Fighters of the United States Air Force

General characteristics

- Crew: 1
- Length: 26 ft 1 in (7.95 m)
- Wingspan: 39 ft 9 in (12.12 m)
- Wing area: 299 sq ft (27.8 m^{2})
- Gross weight: 2,799 lb (1,270 kg)
- Powerplant: 1 × Wright-Hispano H engine , 320 hp (239 kW)

Performance

- Maximum speed: 136 mph (219 km/h, 118 kn)

Armament

- 2 × .30 in (7.62 mm) Lewis machine guns

== See also ==
Related development

- Loening M-8

Related lists

- List of military aircraft of the United States
