= XSG =

XSG may refer to:

- Great Lakes XSG, an amphibious observation aircraft developed in the United States in the early 1930s
- XSG, the station code for Xiaoshan International Airport station, Zhejiang, China
