= Loening C-5 =

1930s American amphibious aircraft

C-5

General information
- Type: Light amphibian
- National origin: United States
- Manufacturer: Grover Loening Aircraft Company
- Number built: 1

History
- First flight: 1934
- Developed from: Loening XSL

The Loening C-5 was an American amphibious aircraft built by Loening in the 1930s.

== Design ==
The C-5, a small amphibian based on the Loening XSL-2, was larger in size and featured an enclosed a cabin. The engine was cowled to reduce drag. One C-5 was built (civil registration X813W), flying in 1934.

== Specifications ==
Data from

General characteristics

- Crew: 2
- Length: 27 ft 11 in (8.50 m)
- Wingspan: 35 ft 5 in (10.80 m)
- Gross weight: 1,500 lb (680 kg)
- Powerplant: 1 × Menasco B-6 6-cylinder air-cooled inverted in-line piston engine, 160 hp (120 kW)
- Propellers: 2-bladed fixed-pitch pusher propeller

Performance
