= O15 =

O15 may refer to:

- HNLMS O 15, a submarine of the Royal Netherlands Navy
- Keystone O-15, a prototype aircraft built for the United States Army Air Corps
- Oxygen-15, an isotope of oxygen
- Turlock Municipal Airport, in Merced County, California, United States
- USS O-15 (SS-76), a submarine of the United States Navy
