= Loening XFL =

Proposed US Navy fighter aircraft

XFL

General information
- Type: Fighter
- National origin: United States
- Manufacturer: Loening Aeronautical Engineering
- Status: Never built

History
- First flight: Never flew

The Loening XFL was a proposed carrier-based fighter aircraft to be built by Loening Aeronautical Engineering for the US Navy. It won a 1933 competition, but Loening was already busy building other aircraft, so the contract was canceled.

== Specifications (as designed) ==
Data from Angelucci, 1987. pp. 292-293.

General characteristics

- Crew: 1
- Length: 20 ft 9 in (6.32 m)
- Wingspan: 28 ft 0 in (8.53 m)
- Empty weight: 4,250 lb (1,928 kg)
- Powerplant: 1 × Wright XR-1510-26 , 625 hp (466 kW)

Performance

- Maximum speed: 200 mph (322 km/h, 170 kn)
