= Loening R-4 =

1920s American aircraft

- Loening R-4 in 1922

General information
- Type: Racing
- National origin: United States
- Manufacturer: Loening
- Primary user: US Army Air Service
- Number built: 2

History
- First flight: 10 January 1922

The Loening R-4 was a racer aircraft built by Loening in the early 1920s.

== Design ==
The R-4 featured a low-wing monoplane layout, and the Packard engine weighed three times the size of the aircraft and took up a quarter length of the R-4, nicknamed the "flying engine". Both R-4 racers (AS68559 and AS68560) were entered in the 1922 Pulitzer Trophy race with poor results, being reported as "almost total flops".

== Operators ==
United States

- United States Army Air Service

== Specifications ==
Data from , Airwar : Loening R-4

General characteristics

- Crew: 1
- Length: 7.16 m (23 ft 6 in)
- Wingspan: 8.20 m (26 ft 11 in)
- Gross weight: 1,383 kg (3,050 lb)
- Powerplant: 1 × Packard 1A-2025 V-12 water-cooled piston engine, 450 kW (600 hp)
- Propellers: 2-bladed fixed pitch propeller

Performance

- Maximum speed: 270 km/h (170 mph, 150 kn)
