= Loening M-8 =

1918 fighter aircraft family by Loening

M-8
- Loening M-8 in 1918

General information
- Type: Monoplane fighter
- Manufacturer: Loening Aeronautical Engineering
- Designer: Grover Loening
- Primary users: United States Navy United States Army Air Corps
- Number built: 55

History
- First flight: 1918
- Variant: Loening PW-2

The Loening M-8 was a 1910s American fighter monoplane designed by Grover Loening and built by his Loening Aeronautical Engineering Company. The order for 5000 for the United States Army Air Corps was canceled when the First World War ended.

== Development ==
The first design by Grover Loening after he had formed his company was a two-seat braced-wing monoplane fighter the M-8. It had a fixed tail-skid landing gear and was powered by a nose-mounted Hispano-Suiza engine with a tractor propeller. The pilot and gunner had tandem open cockpits. The first aircraft was flown in 1918 and after testing, the United States Army Air Corps ordered 5,000 aircraft to be built.

Only two aircraft were delivered to the Army and one to the United States Navy, with the designation M-8-0. At the end of the war the order was canceled. The Navy ordered 46 aircraft in two variants for use as observation aircraft. The Navy also ordered six M-8-S twin-float seaplane versions. A single-seat version was developed for the Army as the Loening PW-2.

== Variants ==
M-8
Production variant for the United States Army Air Corps, two prototypes, 5000 cancelled.
M-8-0
One M-8 for evaluation by the United States Navy (A5631) and ten production aircraft (A5637-A5646).
M-8-1
Second production variant for the United States Navy, 36 built by the Naval Aircraft Factory (A5701-A5710; A5761-A5786).
M-8-1S
Seaplane variant for the United States Navy, six built (A5788-A5793).
LS
(LS - Loening Seaplane) Three seaplane variants ordered to test the Richardson pontoon split central float. One aircraft built, (A5606), and two cancelled.

== Operators ==
United States

- United States Army Air Corps
- United States Navy

== Specifications (M-8-0) ==
Data from United States Navy aircraft since 1911

General characteristics

- Crew: 2
- Length: 24 ft 0 in (7.32 m)
- Wingspan: 32 ft 9 in (9.98 m)
- Height: 6 ft 7 in (2.01 m)
- Wing area: 229 sq ft (21.3 m^{2})
- Empty weight: 1,623 lb (736 kg)
- Gross weight: 2,058 lb (933 kg)
- Powerplant: 1 × Wright-Hisso H-3 V-8 water-cooled piston engine, 300 hp (220 kW)
- Propellers: 2-bladed fixed-pitch wooden propeller

Performance

- Maximum speed: 145 mph (233 km/h, 126 kn)
- Endurance: 5 hours 30 minutes
- Service ceiling: 22,000 ft (6,700 m)
- Time to altitude: 13,900 ft (4,200 m) in 10 minutes

Armament

- 2x 0.3 in (7.62 mm) Lewis machine guns on a Scarff ring in the rear cockpit

== See also ==
Related development

- Loening PW-2

Aircraft of comparable role, configuration, and era

- Junkers CL.I

Related lists

- List of United States Navy aircraft designations (pre-1962)
