= Keystone Patrician =

1920s American prototype airliner

K-78 Patrician
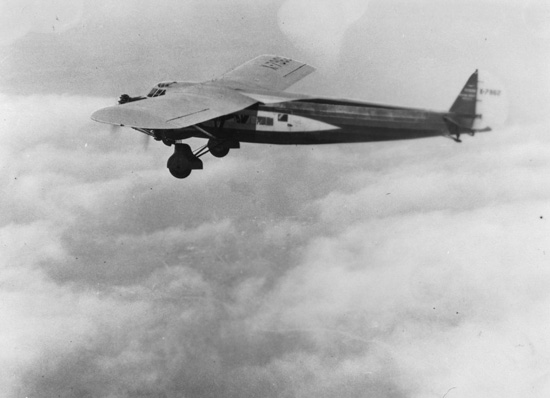
- K-78D Patrician

General information
- Type: Airliner
- National origin: United States
- Manufacturer: Keystone Aircraft
- Number built: 3

History
- First flight: 1929

The Keystone K-78 Patrician was an airliner developed in the United States in the late 1920s, built only in prototype form.

== Design & development ==
The Patrician was a high-wing, strut-braced monoplane following the then-standard trimotor layout, and was intended to be the largest and fastest aircraft of its type. The fuselage was constructed from a chromoly tube framework with aluminum longerons and bulkheads, all skinned in fabric. The inner wings were built from steel-truss spars and metal ribs and fabric-covered, while the outer wings of wooden construction.

The flight test program included a much-publicized return flight across the United States and in another stunt, a successful attempt at a load-carrying record was set by lifting a 4,600 lb (2,090 kg) "payload" of "33 girls, two pilots, and a mechanic" to 10,200 ft (3,110 m) in 25 minutes. Colonial Air Transport then flew the prototype (registered NX7962) on charter operations between New York City and Boston while a definitive version for the airlines was developed under the designation K-78D. This featured 18 seats, a lavatory, and a separate baggage compartment.

The first of these machines (NC98N) was purchased by Wright Aeronautical Corporation for use as an engine testbed, but also as an executive transport. In keeping with this latter role, a deluxe interior was fitted in place of the passenger compartment, which included an office and sleeping berths. The second aircraft (NC10N) was selected for evaluation by Transcontinental Air Transport for use on a cross-United States route. TAT's technical committee, under the leadership of Charles Lindbergh, selected the Patrician over five other aircraft: the Curtiss Condor, Boeing 80A, Ford Trimotor, Fokker F.10, and a Sikorsky biplane. Lindbergh himself flew the Patrician to various stops across the United States to research routes and provide an opportunity for TAT to generate publicity for the planned service. One of these stops turned into a fiasco when the Patrician became bogged in mud while landing at Mills Field, San Francisco, requiring the various dignitaries aboard to be unloaded while the aircraft was dug out.

Certification was obtained on 30 October 1929, but before the initial intended batch of ten Patricians could be produced, the Great Depression made itself felt, and the market disappeared. Keystone reduced the asking price from $90,000 to $65,000, but still found no buyers, and the three prototypes were the only Patricians ever built.

== Operators ==
United States

- Transcontinental Air Transport
- Wright Aeronautical Corporation

== Specifications (K-78D) ==
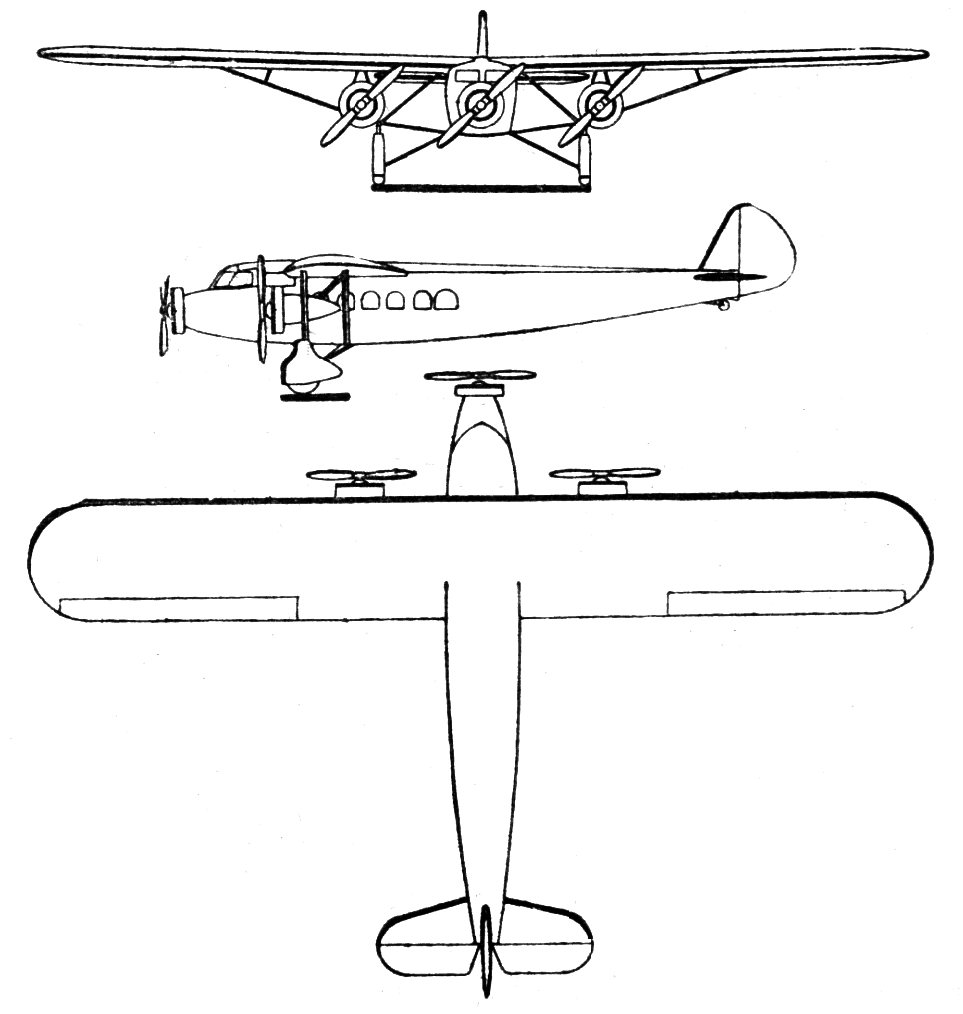
Keystone Patrician 3-view drawing from Les Ailes December 27,1928

General characteristics

- Crew: Three - two pilots and mechanic
- Capacity: 18 passengers plus 600 lb (270 kg) of cargo
- Length: 61 ft 7 in (18.77 m)
- Wingspan: 86 ft 5 in (26.34 m)
- Powerplant: 3 × Wright Cyclone , 525 hp (390 kW) each

Performance

- Maximum speed: 148 mph (236 km/h, 129 kn)
- Range: 550 mi (880 km, 480 nmi)
