= Keystone NK =

1920s American naval training aircraft

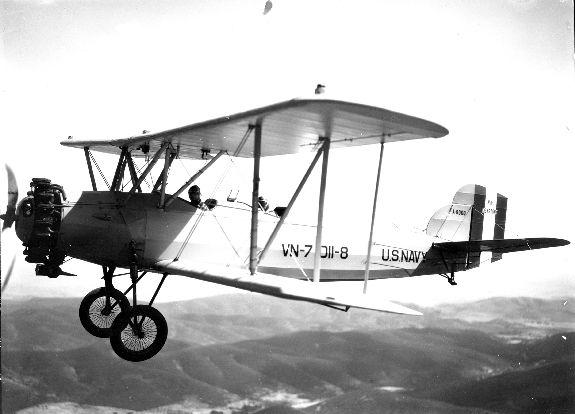

General information
- Type: Biplane trainer
- National origin: United States
- Manufacturer: Keystone Aircraft
- Primary user: United States Navy
- Number built: 20

History
- Introduction date: 1930
- First flight: 1928

The Keystone NK or Keystone Pup was a two-seat biplane trainer built by Keystone Aircraft for the United States Navy.

== Design and development ==
The NK was an open-cockpit two-seat biplane with a convertible wheel or float landing gear. It was powered by a 220 hp (164 kW) Wright R-790 Whirlwind. The company prototype designated the Pup was entered into a United States Navy design competition for a trainer and was awarded a contract for three prototypes designated XNK-1. Following evaluation a production batch of 16 was ordered designated NK-1 which were delivered during 1930.

== Variants ==
Pup
Keystone prototype, one built.
XNK-1
Prototypes for Naval variant of Pup, three built.
NK-1
Production aircraft with minor changes, 16 built.

== Operators ==
United States

- United States Navy

== Specifications (NK-1) ==
General characteristics

- Crew: 2
- Length: 26 ft 6 in (8.08 m)
- Wingspan: 37 ft 0 in (11.28 m)
- Powerplant: 1 × Wright R-790 Whirlwind , 220 hp (164 kW)

Performance

- Maximum speed: 116 mph (186 km/h, 101 kn)
- Range: 375 mi (603 km, 326 nmi)
