= Keystone–Loening Commuter =

1920s American flying boat

K-84 Commuter
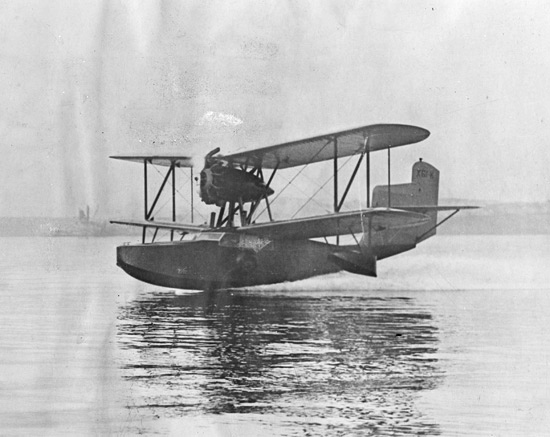

General information
- Type: Flying boat
- National origin: United States
- Manufacturer: Keystone–Loening

History
- First flight: 1929

The Keystone–Loening K-84 Commuter was a single-engine closed-cabin 4-place biplane amphibious flying boat built by Keystone–Loening. It was powered by a 300 hp Wright Whirlwind engine mounted between the wings with the propeller just ahead of the windscreen. It was first produced in 1929.

This airplane was featured as a model/bank by Texaco, #8 in a series "Wings of Texaco", of historic aircraft used by the company.

== Surviving aircraft ==
- 305 "Kruzof" – K-84 on display at the Golden Wings Flying Museum in Minneapolis, Minnesota.
- 313 "The Old Patches" – K-84 on display at the Alaska Aviation Museum, in Anchorage, Alaska.

== Specifications ==
Data from American airplanes: Keystone

General characteristics

- Crew: 1
- Capacity: 3 passengers / 1,223 lb (555 kg)
- Length: 32 ft 5 in (9.88 m)
- Wingspan: 36 ft (11 m) (some sources 40 ft (12 m))
- Powerplant: 1 × Wright J-6-7 7-cyl. air-cooled radial piston engine, 300 hp (220 kW) -330 hp (250 kW)

Performance

- Maximum speed: 115 mph (185 km/h, 100 kn)
- Cruise speed: 90 mph (140 km/h, 78 kn)
- Stall speed: 50 mph (80 km/h, 43 kn)
- Range: 510 mi (810 km, 440 nmi)
- Service ceiling: 12,000 ft (3,700 m)

== Bibliography ==
- Elliot, Bryn (March–April 1997). "Bears in the Air: The US Air Police Perspective". Air Enthusiast. No. 68. pp. 46–51. ISSN 0143-5450.
