= Keystone Aircraft =

American airplane manufacturer

Keystone Aircraft Corporation
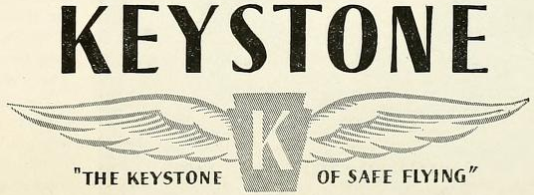

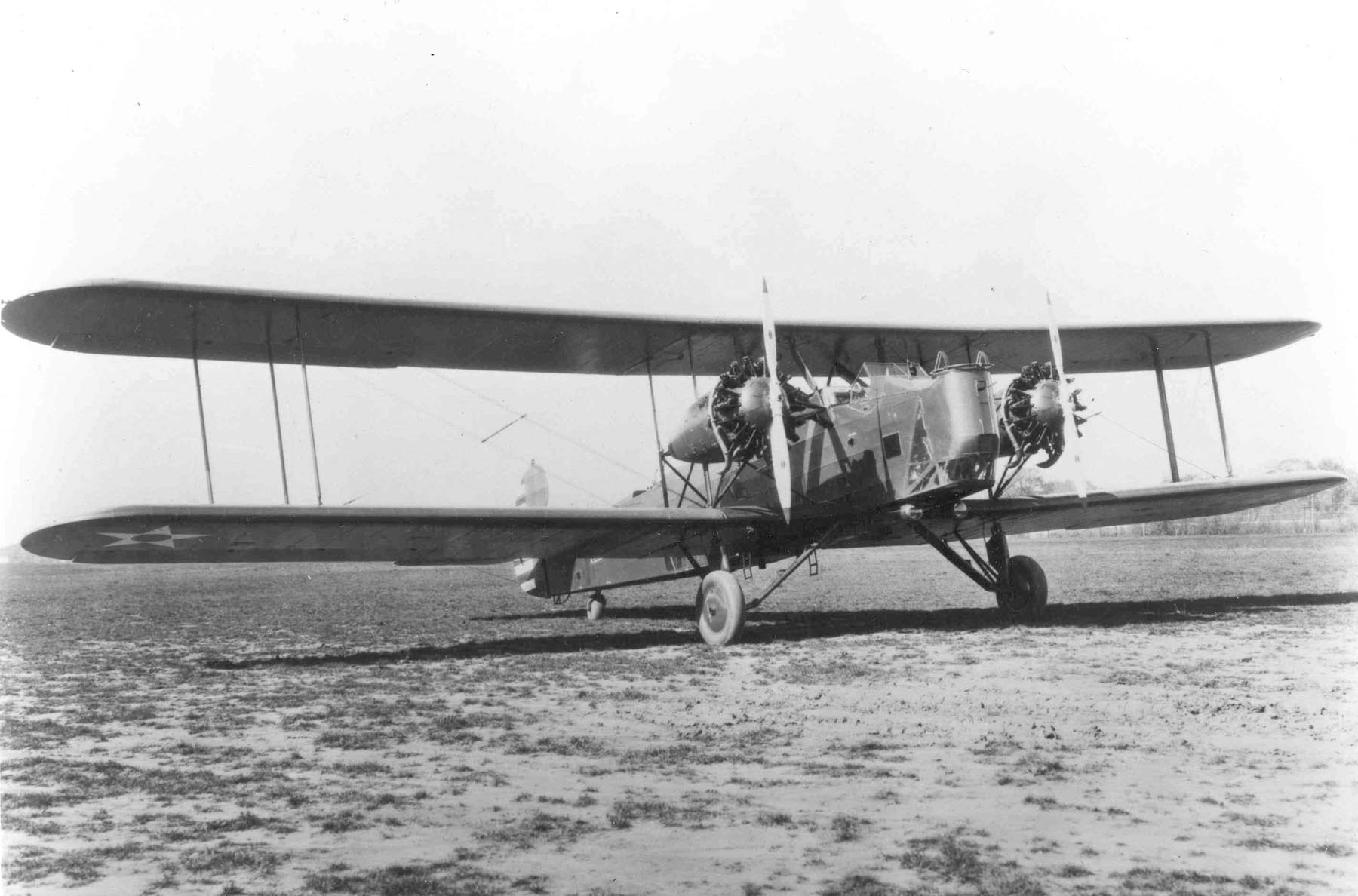
- The first Keystone B-3A bomber built, serial number 30-281
- Industry: Aerospace
- Predecessor: Huff-Daland Aero Corporation
- Defunct: 1929
- Fate: Merged into Curtiss-Wright in 1929
- Successor: Curtiss-Wright
- Headquarters: Bristol, Pennsylvania
- Key people: James McDonnell

Keystone Aircraft Corporation was an early American airplane manufacturer.

== History ==
Headquartered in Bristol, Pennsylvania, the company was formed as "Ogdensburg Aeroway Corp" in 1920 by Thomas Huff and Elliot Daland, but its name was quickly changed to "Huff-Daland Aero Corp", then to "Huff-Daland Aero Company". The company made a name for itself in agricultural aircraft, and then in the United States Army Air Corps' early bomber aircraft. From 1924, James McDonnell was the chief designer.

In 1926, Huff left the company, and it was soon purchased by Hayden, Stone & Co., who increased capital to $1 million (United States) and renamed it Keystone. In 1928, it merged with Loening and was known as Keystone–Loening. In 1929, it was taken over by Curtiss-Wright. Also in 1929, the Keystone–Loening plant on the East River in New York City was closed by Curtiss-Wright and the operation was moved to the Bristol, Pennsylvania Keystone plant. A small band of the top Loening management, design and shop workers (all New Yorkers) did not want to go to Bristol. They instead started their own aircraft company in a small rented shop in Baldwin, NY in Jan. 1930. The principal players were Leroy R. Grumman, Leon "Jake" Swirbul and William Schwendler. Grumman Aircraft went on to stellar heights with some of the best aircraft in US Navy history. Grumman also designed and built the Lunar Excursion Module (LEM) that landed US astronauts on the Moon.

In 1932 the Army Air Corps issued a Circular design proposal for an advanced new heavy bomber which Ford, Martin, Boeing, Fokker, Douglas and Keystone submitted designs. The Keystone entry was for an all metal low winged monoplane bomber with retractable landing gear. The bomber would be powered by two Curtiss V-1570 geared Conqueror engines. With a crew of 5 it was armed with up to 3 x .30 caliber machine guns and could carry 2,000 lbs (907 kg) of bombs on external racks. A mock-up of the aircraft was inspected by the Air Corps in April and was withdrawn by Keystone after it was determined it could not meet the requirements. The contract was ultimately won by Martin for their Model 139, known as the B-10 Bomber. This was to be the last design submitted to the military by Keystone.

Keystone itself became a manufacturing division of Curtiss-Wright and ceased production in 1932. The former Keystone plant was purchased by Fleetwings in 1934.

Lieut. Comdr. Noel Davis and Lieut. Stanton H. Wooster were killed in their Keystone Pathfinder American Legion while conducting a test flight, just days before they were to attempt a trans-Atlantic flight for the Orteig Prize.

== Aircraft ==
Model name	First flight	Number built	Type
Huff-Daland TW-5		26	Single engine biplane trainer
Huff-Daland XB-1	1927	1	Prototype twin engine biplane bomber
Keystone PK		18	License built version of Naval Aircraft Factory PN
Keystone XLB-3		1	Prototype twin engine biplane bomber
Keystone LB-5	1927	36	Twin engine biplane bomber
Keystone LB-6	1927	18	Twin engine biplane bomber
Keystone B-3		36	Twin engine biplane bomber
Keystone B-4		30	Twin engine biplane bomber
Keystone B-5		30	Twin engine biplane bomber
Keystone B-6		44	Twin engine biplane bomber
Keystone K-47 Pathfinder	1927	2	Trimotor biplane airliner
Keystone K-55 Pronto	1927		Single engine biplane mail plane
Keystone–Loening K-85 Air Yacht	1928	4	Single engine biplane flying boat
Keystone NK	1928	20	Single engine biplane trainer
Keystone K-78 Patrician	1929	3	Trimotor monoplane airliner
Keystone–Loening K-84 Commuter	1929		Single engine biplane flying boat
Keystone XO-15	1930	1	Prototype single engine observation biplane
Keystone XOK	1931	1	Single engine biplane floatplane
Keystone Bomber Design (USAAC XB-908)	1932	0	Twin engine monoplane bomber
Keystone–Loening XS2L	1933	1	Single engine biplane flying boat
