= Grover Loening =

American aircraft manufacturer (1888–1976)

Grover Cleveland Loening
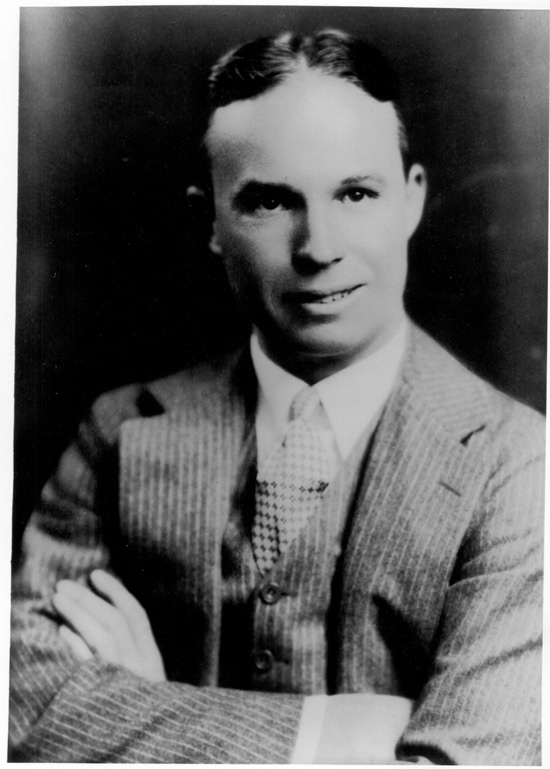
- Born: September 12, 1888; Bremen, German Empire
- Died: February 29, 1976 (aged 87); Coconut Grove, Florida, US
- Education: Columbia University
- Occupations: Aircraft pilot, designer, builder, author and advisor
- Children: 3
- Awards: Wright Brothers Memorial Trophy (1950); Daniel Guggenheim Medal (1960)

Grover Cleveland Loening (September 12, 1888 – February 29, 1976) was an American aircraft manufacturer.

== Biography ==
Loening was born in Bremen, in what was then Imperial Germany, on September 12, 1888, while his American-born father was stationed there as U.S. Consul. He graduated from Columbia University in New York City, where he was awarded the first-ever degree in Aeronautical Engineering.

Following graduation, he joined the Queen Aeroplane Company in New York, managed the Wright Company factory in Dayton, Ohio for Orville Wright in 1913 and 1914, published a book, Military Airplanes, and became Vice President of the Sturtevant Aeroplane Company and Chief engineer for the Army in San Diego. In 1917 he formed the Loening Aeronautical Engineering Corporation; after it merged with Keystone Aircraft in 1928, he formed the Grover Loening Aircraft Company. His work on the Loening Flying Yacht won the 1921 Collier Trophy. His notoriety increasing in 1927, Loening dated Elizabeth Nast, a Vogue model twenty years his junior with an affinity for flying. Loening would test fly his own aircraft. Among his employees were Leroy Grumman, William T. Schwendler, and Jake Swirbul who would go on to form Grumman. The company eventually closed in 1933. During World War II he was chief consultant to the War Production Board, NACA, and Grumman.

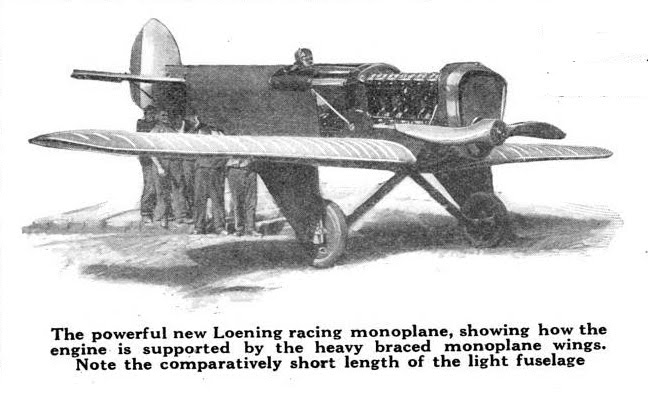
Loening designed monoplane, circa 1923.

When asked how to say his name, he told The Literary Digest: "The correct American pronunciation, used by me and universally in aviation, is one that ignores the e or the umlaut suggestion; viz., the low is pronounced as low to rhyme with doe, and accenting the first syllable—lo'ning." (Charles Earle Funk, What's the Name, Please?, Funk & Wagnalls, 1936.)

In 1965 Loening was inducted into the International Air & Space Hall of Fame for his innovation in seaplane technology and production. He is celebrated along with the other inductees in the Hall of Fame's portrait gallery within the San Diego Air and Space Museum.

In 1969, Loening was inducted into the National Aviation Hall of Fame in Dayton, Ohio.

He is a 1976 recipient of the Langley Gold Medal from the Smithsonian Institution.

He died on February 29, 1976, in Coconut Grove, Florida.

== Bibliography ==
- Loening, Grover. Our Wings Grow Faster: In These Personal Episodes of a Lifetime in Aviation May Be Found an Historical and Pictorial Record Showing How We So Quickly Stepped Into This Air Age - and Through What Kind of Difficulties and Developments We Had to Pass to Get There. Garden City, New York: Doubleday, Doran & Co., 1935.
- Loening, Grover. Takeoff Into Greatness: How American Aviation Grew So Big So Fast. New York: G.P. Putnam's Sons, 1968.
- Loening, Grover. Conquering Wing. Philadelphia: Chilton Book Company, 1970.
- Loening, Grover. Amphibian; The Story of the Loening Biplane. Greenwich, CT: New York Graphic Society, 1973. ISBN 0-8212-0522-6
- Sprekelmeyer, Linda, editor. These We Honor: The International Aerospace Hall of Fame. Donning Co. Publishers, 2006. ISBN 978-1-57864-397-4.
