= Keystone XO-15 =

1930s American prototype observation aircraft

General information
- Type: Observation aircraft
- Manufacturer: Keystone Aircraft Corporation
- Primary user: United States Army Air Corps

History
- Manufactured: 1
- First flight: 1930

The Keystone XO-15 was an American prototype observation aircraft, built by the Keystone Aircraft Corporation for the United States Army Air Corps, First flown in 1930, only a single prototype was built.

== Specifications (XO-15) ==
Data from

General characteristics

- Crew: Two
- Length: 27 ft 1 in (8.26 m)
- Wingspan: 37 ft 3 in (11.35 m)
- Height: 9 ft 9 in (2.97 m)
- Empty weight: 1,776 lb (806 kg)
- Gross weight: 2,518 lb (1,142 kg)
- Powerplant: 1 × Wright R-790 radial piston engine , 236 hp (176 kW)

Performance

- Maximum speed: 119 mph (192 km/h, 103 kn)
- Cruise speed: 95 mph (153 km/h, 83 kn)
- Service ceiling: 18,625 ft (5,677 m)

Armament

- 2 x .30-cal machine guns

== See also ==
Aircraft of comparable role, configuration, and era

- Douglas XO-14

Related lists

- List of military aircraft of the United States
