= Loening XSL =

Amphibious aircraft developed for the United States Navy

XSL
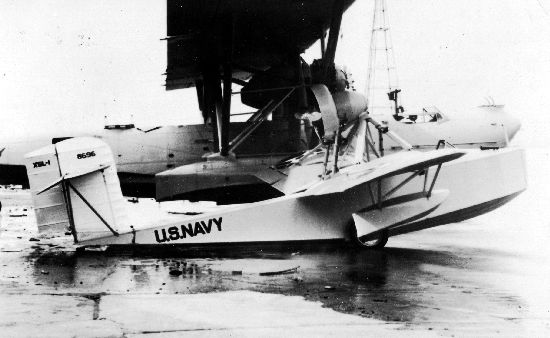
- The XSL-1

General information
- Type: Submarine-borne flying-boat
- National origin: United States
- Manufacturer: Grover Loening Aircraft Company
- Primary user: United States Navy
- Number built: 1

History
- First flight: 1931

The Loening XSL was an American submarine-based reconnaissance flying boat designed and built by Grover Loening Aircraft Company for the United States Navy.

== Design and development ==
First flown in 1931, the Loening XSL was a lightweight flying-boat designed to be folded up and stored in an 8-foot-diameter watertight tube on the deck of a submarine. It was a single-seat, mid-wing monoplane powered by a 110 hp (82 kW) Warner Scarab radial engine mounted above the wing driving a pusher propeller. Originally designated the XSL-1 by the Navy, it was re-designated XSL-2 in 1932 when it was re-engined with a 160 hp (119 kW) Menasco B-6 engine. Only the prototype was built; it was not ordered into production.

== Variants ==
XSL-1
Prototype with a Warner Scarab engine.
XSL-2
Prototype re-engined with a Menasco B-6 engine.

== Specifications (XSL-1) ==
Data from aerofiles.com

General characteristics

- Crew: 1
- Length: 27 ft 2 in (8.28 m)
- Wingspan: 31 ft 0 in (9.45 m)
- Gross weight: 1,500 lb (680 kg)
- Powerplant: 1 × Warner Scarab radial engine , 100 hp (75 kW)

Performance

- Maximum speed: 100 mph (160 km/h, 87 kn)
- Cruise speed: 88 mph (142 km/h, 76 kn)
- Service ceiling: 14,000 ft (4,268 m)

== See also ==
Related lists

- List of flying boats and floatplanes
- List of United States Navy aircraft designations (pre-1962)

== Bibliography ==
- Andrade, John (1979). U.S.Military Aircraft Designations and Serials since 1909. Midland Counties Publications. ISBN 0-904597-22-9.
- Passingham, Malcolm (February 2000). "Les hydravions embarqués sur sous-marins" [Submarine-carried Seaplanes]. Avions: Toute l'aéronautique et son histoire (in French) (83): 7–17. ISSN 1243-8650.
