= Leroy Grumman =

American engineer and industrialist (1895-1982)

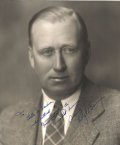
- Roy Grumman in 1942
- Born: Leroy Randle Grumman; 4 January 1895; Huntington, New York, U.S.
- Died: 4 October 1982 (aged 87); Manhasset, New York, U.S.
- Resting place: Locust Valley Cemetery, Locust Valley, New York, U.S.
- Education: Cornell University (BS)
- Occupation: Co-founder of Grumman corporation
- Spouse: Rose Marion Werther (m. 1921)
- Children: Three daughters: Marion Grumman Phillips, Florence Grumman Hold, and Grace Grumman Nelson; One son: David Grumman

Leroy Randle "Roy" Grumman (4 January 1895 – 4 October 1982) was an American aeronautical engineer, test pilot, and industrialist. In 1929, he co-founded Grumman Aircraft Engineering Co., later renamed Grumman Aerospace Corporation, and now part of Northrop Grumman.

== Early life ==
Grumman was born in Huntington, New York. His forebears had Connecticut roots and owned a brewery. When he was a child, his father, George Tyson Grumman, owned and operated a carriage shop, and later worked for the post office. From an early age, "Red Mike" (a nickname he gained because of his red-blond hair) demonstrated an interest in aviation, and in his 20 June 1911 high school salutatory address at Huntington High School, Grumman predicted that "[t]he final perfection of the aeroplane will be one of the greatest triumphs that man has ever gained over nature."

Grumman earned a Bachelor of Science degree in mechanical engineering from Cornell University in 1916. His first job was in the engineering department of the New York Telephone Company. After the United States entered World War I, he enlisted in the U.S. Naval Reserve in June 1917 as a machinist's mate, 2nd class, and was sent to Columbia University for a course on "subchaser" engines.

== Aviation career ==
Although Grumman applied for flight training, he failed a medical evaluation when the examining board incorrectly diagnosed flat feet. A clerical error, however, had him report to a course in aircraft inspection for pilot trainees at Massachusetts Institute of Technology. Without revealing the error in classification, he entered primary flight training at Naval Air Station Miami and successfully completed advanced flight training in Pensacola, Florida, in September 1918. Raymond P. Applegate, his flight instructor, recalled several years later that his young charge "was very, very reticent. Most of the guys, after they [learned to] fly, they became tougher than hell. Grumman didn't." He was commissioned an ensign (as naval aviator No. 1216), eventually becoming a flight instructor, and assigned to a bombing squadron.

After one tour of duty, the U.S. Navy sent him to Massachusetts Institute of Technology to study the brand new discipline of aeronautical engineering. After the completion of the course, Grumman's first posting, along with a promotion to lieutenant, was at the League Island Naval Yard as an acceptance test pilot for Curtiss- and Navy-built flying boats.

In 1919, the U.S. Navy stationed Grumman at Loening Aeronautical Engineering Corporation in New York City as the project engineer to supervise the firm's construction of 52 Loening M-8 monoplane observation/fighter aircraft under contract to the Navy. His duties included test flying as well as serving as the production supervisor. Grover Loening, the company president, was so impressed with his work that he offered Grumman a position. After a reduction in rank to ensign in the peacetime U.S. Navy, Grumman resigned his Naval commission in October 1920, becoming a test pilot flying various types of Loening amphibians while doing some design and development on these aircraft. He quickly moved up in the Loening organization, becoming the factory manager and then general manager with responsibility over aircraft design, a position he held until the company was sold in 1929 on the eve of the Depression to Keystone Aircraft. Keystone closed their Manhattan factory and moved operations to Bristol, Pennsylvania.

== Company founding ==
Unwilling to leave Long Island to continue working for Keystone, Grumman joined fellow Loening employees Jake Swirbul and William Schwendler in resolving that their best option was to quit and form their own company. Grumman mortgaged his house for $16,950 and Swirbul's mother borrowed $6,000 from her employers to help set up Grumman Aeronautical Engineering Co. (Note: Grumman Aeronautical Engineering Company was later known as Grumman Aircraft Engineering Corporation and Grumman Aerospace Corporation. In 1994 Northrop Corporation bought Grumman Aerospace for $2.1 billion to form Northrop Grumman.) The co-founders were soon joined by Ed Poor, Grover Loening's business manager, and E. Clinton Towl, who had recently come from Wall Street. These five men formed the company's inner circle of management for the next 50 years. Loening and his brother, Albert P. Loening, also became investors. The company was named after its largest stockholder and first president.

On 2 January 1930, the company took possession of an abandoned auto showroom garage in Baldwin, New York, that had once been the Cox-Klemin Aircraft Co. factory. Initially, the new company, with only 18 people on salary, had contracts to repair damaged Loening amphibians (surplus parts had been bought from the Loening works) and traded on its expertise in working with aluminum by building aluminum floats and producing aluminum truck bodies. The first project of the new company involved Grumman and Swirbul, as president and vice-president, on hands and knees, sorting out and matching nuts and bolts, prior to assembling Loening floats.

Swirbul and Grumman oversaw the day-to-day operations of the company. While the employees in the plant felt comfortable calling the outgoing Swirbul "Jake", no one ever called Grumman anything but "Mr. Grumman" out of deference to his reserved manner and respect for his skill as an engineer and designer. Dick Hutton, Grumman engineer and later senior vice-president of engineering described him as a "great engineer, respected by many ..." To family and close friends, he was invariably known as "Roy".

Having been told of the U.S. Navy's desire for retractable landing gear, Leroy Grumman was awarded U.S. patent 1,859,624, Retractable Landing Gear for Airplanes in 1932, based on an earlier design that he had developed for the Loening Air Yacht. The innovative, manually operated landing gear which progressed from a heavy and unreliable design to a more sturdy version helped his company win contracts from the U.S. Navy. When the Grumman Company received its first U.S. Navy production contract for a two-seater biplane fighter, the FF-1, it featured Grumman's trademark "splayed out" landing gear. Grumman's ability as an engineer and designer was characterized by a Grumman Company engineer as that of "'a master of the educated hunch' who could foresee technical problems and their solutions." He single-handedly invented the famous "Sto-Wing" wing-panel folding system that revolutionized carrier aircraft storage and handling, pioneered on the F4F-4 Wildcat subtype. He worked out the solution by sticking paper clips into a soap eraser to find the pivot point that made the Sto-Wing possible.

Although Grumman realized the importance of his close relationship with the U.S. Navy, by the mid-1930s, he began to design aircraft for the commercial market with the development of the G-21 "Goose" amphibian and the G-22 "Gulfhawk", civil version of the Grumman F3F carrier-based fighter.

=== Expansion ===
As the company expanded, it moved to bigger quarters – to Valley Stream in 1931, Farmingdale in 1932, and finally Bethpage in 1937. In 1934, a company legend grew up around the number "250" which marked the zenith for expansion in Grumman's mind. He reasoned that if there were more than 250 employees, "it's going to be too big and we're going to lose control of it. That's where we ought to stop." Company accountant Towl was eventually deputized to tell Grumman that the payroll was already at 256.

Although Grumman resisted the "expansionist" efforts that Swirbul advocated, employment grew from 700 in 1939 to 25,500 in 1943, with the company known as the "Grumman Iron Works" (a name derived from their product line's rugged structure and a design philosophy espoused by both Swirbul and Grumman) becoming the primary source for U.S. Navy aircraft.

== Management style ==
Despite his innate shyness, Grumman's management style included a "hands-on" approach where he could talk comfortably with both executives and factory floor workers. His relationship with Swirbul was unusual. They resolved early in their partnership to work out of one office; both men further pledged that any problems or conflicts that arose between them would not fester, and that neither man would leave the office until they came to an understanding.

During an unusually hectic period in the summer of 1944, Grumman sought a release from tension in a unique manner. Seeking out company test pilot Selden "Connie" Converse, he asked for a check out in a "hot ship": the front line F6F Hellcat. After a 10-minute cockpit check, Grumman waved Converse away, started the engine and was soon taxiing down the runway and into the air on a half-hour joy ride. Even though he hadn't flown for years, as he had in the past, when things built up, he would "take his troubles upstairs and leave them there." The factory test pilots observed that Grumman had the flaps down as he taxied back to the flight line, and insisted that he pay the standard $1.00 fine for a flight infraction. Grumman stuffed a five-dollar bill into the party fund container, confiding that it was to make up "for things he'd done in the air that they hadn't seen."

== World War II ==
By 1939, as World War II began, Grumman's struggling company could hardly be considered an industrial giant, with all of its property relying on the services of a single security guard, yet the company was obtaining important civil and military contracts. However, the next year saw dramatic changes in the company's fortunes as the war in Europe prompted France and Britain to order F4F Wildcats, Grumman's first monoplane fighter design, still bearing his original signature design element, the retractable undercarriage that had been created in 1932.

Beginning with the Wildcat and then with the F6F Hellcat fighters, Grumman and Swirbul remained the key figures in the design office. As the war progressed, the pair continued to advance new projects, including the largest single-engine aircraft of World War II, the TBF Avenger torpedo bomber, and F7F Tigercat and F8F Bearcat fighter aircraft.

Near the end of the war, Grumman was given a penicillin injection to combat pneumonia, resulting in a severe reaction that affected his eyesight. Although he was not entirely blind, his vision was greatly affected; Grumman began to "become less visible" in the company.

== Postwar ==
By March 1945, Grumman oversaw a production effort where all types reached a record 664 aircraft manufactured in one month, although Swirbul had "farmed out" production to a vast chain of subsidiary and licensed manufacturing plants. Like its competitors, Grumman Aircraft Engineering Corporation experienced severe postwar downsizing, dropping from 20,500 to 5,400 employees immediately after the cessation of hostilities. It was an extremely hard decision because the company had been careful to cultivate a positive workplace culture; when a canvass was made of employees who wanted to "move on" at war's end, only 126 came forward.

Swirbul realized his wartime expansion would have to be abandoned, and together with Grumman made the momentous call for a complete layoff of all staff. However, Grumman personally retained as many veteran employees as possible, calling back the most proficient and experienced "hands", predominantly those who had 10 years of service. Grumman stepped down from the role of company president in 1946, but continued to play an active role in management.

Building with the core group, Swirbul and Grumman restructured the company, first solidifying its long-term contracts with the U.S. Navy, beginning a continuous line of new combat aircraft. Grumman's first venture into jet aircraft, the F9F Panther, became operational in 1949, although the company's most significant postwar successes came in the 1960s with the A-6 Intruder and in the 1970s with the F-14 Tomcat. Although the relationship that Grumman had established with the U.S. Navy was the hallmark of the company's success, a set of new projects were initiated with the development of an engineering department, set up in much the same way that he had started out, with a small core of eight engineers given the mandate to explore new technology.

With Swirbul's death on 28 June 1960, Grumman lost not only a close friend but his "right hand" during a time when he was faced with critical decisions as to the company's future. He successfully guided the company into finding new markets for new products. In the move to diversification, he again entered the commercial civil aviation market, introducing landmark designs such as the Ag Cat aerial application and crop-dusting biplane and the Gulfstream I, Gulfstream II, Gulfstream III and Gulfstream IV series of executive turboprop and jet transport aircraft. Although his role as chairman became reduced, Grumman's counsel was paramount and when the Gulfstream project was launched, two models of a high-wing and low-wing configuration were set up outside his office. Grumman personally made the decision to go with "the low wing".

While continuing the company tradition of aircraft production for naval aviation, Grumman pushed for a shift in priorities resulting in the Space Steering Group, a space program that culminated in the design and production of the Apollo program's Lunar Excursion Module (LEM) that landed astronauts on the Moon in 1969. During that same year, the company was rebranded as Grumman Aerospace Corporation. Throughout this period, Grumman's eyesight continued to fail, and he "took to wearing dark glasses" which further limited his mobility.

== Later life ==
On 19 May 1966, Grumman retired as chairman of Grumman, but was elected honorary chairman for his lifetime, remaining as a director until 15 June 1972. He continued to visit the company's facilities until his health began to fail in the early 1980s, as diabetes robbed him of the last "vestiges of his eyesight." Grumman and his family retained their 8,299 sq ft, 2.5 acre waterfront estate at 77 Bayview Road in Plandome Manor on Long Island where, after a long illness, he died at the North Shore University Hospital in nearby Manhasset on 4 October 1982, aged 87.

== Honors and tributes ==
A number of honors have been bestowed on Grumman including the Medal for Merit from the U.S. President (1948), an honorary Doctor of Engineering degree by Brooklyn Polytechnic Institute in 1950, the Daniel Guggenheim Medal for aeronautics pioneering, and the NAS Award in Aeronautical Engineering (1968) from the National Academy of Sciences.

In 1972, Grumman was inducted in the National Aviation Hall of Fame, the International Air & Space Hall of Fame in 1973, and the Long Island Technology Hall of Fame in 2002.

The USNS Leroy Grumman (T-AO-195), a United States Navy fleet replenishment oiler, christened by his three daughters, was launched in 1988 and delivered to the U.S. Navy in 1989. In January 2011, a Civil Air Patrol Squadron from Northport, Long Island, New York, was renamed in his honor: the former Suffolk County Cadet Squadron VII now calls itself the Leroy R. Grumman Cadet Squadron.

In 1953, Grumman was elected to the board of trustees of his alma mater, Cornell University, and donated $110,000 for a new squash building which now bears his name, as does an office and lab space on the campus.

We always tried to do a solid job.

— Leroy Grumman, 1982
(from one of his last public appearances)
