= Sikorsky XSS =

XSS
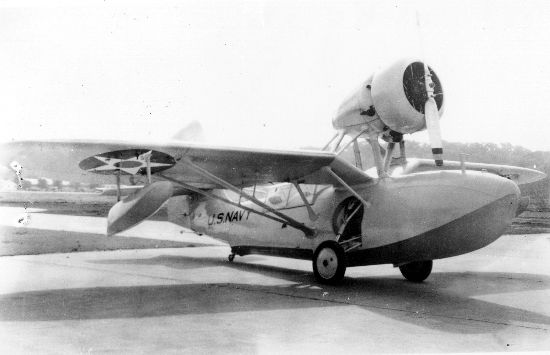
- XSS-2

General information
- Type: Naval scout flying boat
- National origin: United States
- Manufacturer: Sikorsky Aircraft
- Primary user: United States Navy
- Number built: 1

History
- First flight: 1933

The Sikorsky XSS was an American two-seat amphibious flying boat built by Sikorsky Aircraft for evaluation by the United States Navy in 1933, for carrier-borne and/or catapult-launched scouting duties.

== Design and development ==
The XSS-1 was powered by a 550 hp (410 kW) Pratt & Whitney R-1340D Wasp engine in a strut-mounted pod above the center-section of the high-mounted gull-wing, forward of the cockpit which was aft of the wing.

== See also ==
Related lists

- List of flying boats and floatplanes
