= Great Lakes XSG =

XSG
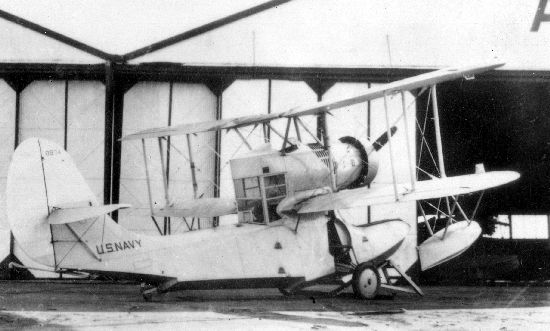

General information
- Type: Reconnaissance amphibian
- Manufacturer: Great Lakes
- Primary user: United States Navy
- Number built: 1

History
- First flight: 1931

The Great Lakes XSG was an amphibious observation aircraft developed in the United States in the early 1930s for a US Navy competition. It was an ungainly and unorthodox biplane design with a single large pontoon mounted below the lower wing. This pontoon extended rearwards and carried the conventional empennage. On top of the lower wing, where the fuselage would normally be located, was a stubby nacelle containing the tractor-mounted engine and the pilot's cockpit. The rear of this nacelle was semi-enclosed with glazing and incorporated a position for a tail gunner. The main units of the wheeled undercarriage retracted into the sides of the central pontoon.

Development quickly ended when trials revealed that the aircraft was incapable of reaching the speeds required by the Navy, and only a single prototype was ever built.

== Specifications ==
General characteristics

- Crew: Two, pilot and gunner
- Length: 32 ft 7 in (9.90 m)
- Wingspan: 35 ft 0 in (10.60 m)
- Height: 13 ft 0 in (3.90 m)
- Gross weight: 3,219 lb (1,912 kg)
- Powerplant: 1 × Pratt & Whitney R-985 , 400 hp (300 kW)

Performance

- Maximum speed: 136 mph (219 km/h, 118 kn)
- Service ceiling: 14,700 ft (4,480 m)

Armament

- 1 × trainable, rearward-firing machine gun in aft cockpit
