= Loening C-2 =

1920s American amphibious airliner

C-2 Air Yacht
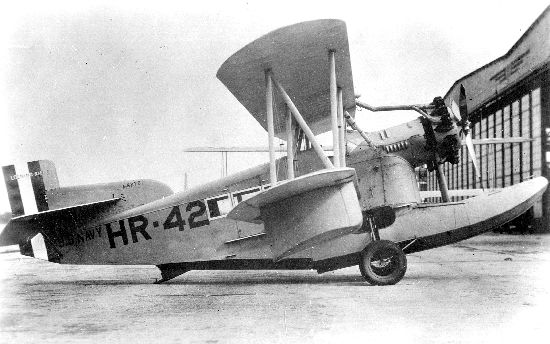
- One of the XHL-1s

General information
- Type: Amphibious airliner
- National origin: United States
- Manufacturer: Loening
- Designer: Grover Loening
- Number built: 36

History
- First flight: 1928

The Loening C-2 Air Yacht was an amphibious airliner produced in the United States at the end of the 1920s, developed from the OL observation aircraft the firm was producing for the US military.

== Design and development ==
The C-2 was a two-bay biplane of unconventional design, with a tall, narrow fuselage that nearly filled the interplane gap. The pilot (and sometimes one passenger) sat in an open cockpit at the top of the fuselage, with the engine mounted in front of them. Underneath the fuselage was a long "shoehorn"-style float, that extended forward underneath the engine and propeller. Four to six passengers could be accommodated in a fully enclosed cabin within the fuselage. The main units of the undercarriage retracted into wells in the sides of the fuselage. Stabilising floats were fitted against the undersides of the lower wing.

The C-2 was produced in two versions, the C-2C with a Wright Cyclone engine and the C-2H with a Pratt & Whitney Hornet. Two examples of this latter version were evaluated by the USMC as air ambulances under the designation XHL-1.

== Operational history ==
One C-2C, modified from an OL, was flown from New York City to Bergen by Thor Solberg in 1935, the first flight from the United States to Norway. Solberg christened the aircraft Leiv Eiriksson and used it to roughly re-trace its namesake's journey across the Atlantic (albeit from West-to-East, and by air) via Greenland, Iceland, and the Faroe Islands. This aircraft is now preserved in the Norsk Teknisk Museum in Oslo.

Two C-2Hs were also used by the firm Air Ferries in the 1930s before the San Francisco–Oakland Bay Bridge was completed to transport passengers between Oakland and San Francisco, cutting a normal forty-minute ferry boat ride to just six minutes.

The first commercial flights in Aruba were made in 1934 using a C-2H which had been purchased from Standard Oil in Venezuela.

== Variants ==
- C-2C - Wright Cyclone-powered version (23 built)
- C-2H - (USN designation XHL) Pratt & Whitney Hornet-powered version (13 built, plus one converted from C-2C.

== Operators ==
=== Civilian operators ===
- Kohler Aviation Corporation
- Air Ferries Ltd

=== Military operators ===
United States

- United States Marine Corps

== Specifications (C-2H) ==
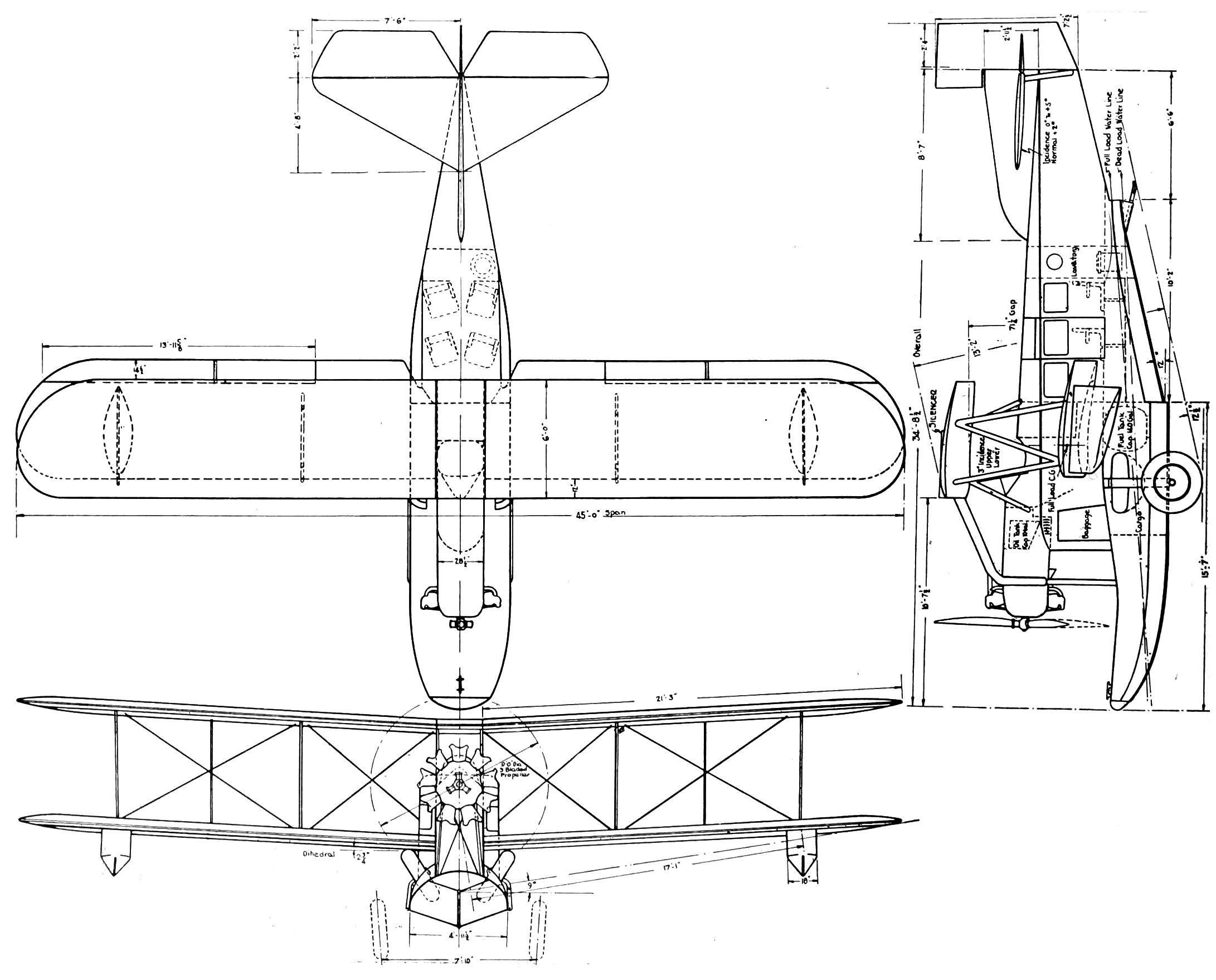
Loening C-1W Amphibian 3-view drawing from Aero Digest April 1928

General characteristics

- Crew: One pilot
- Capacity: 7 passengers
- Length: 34 ft 8 in (10.57 m)
- Wingspan: 45 ft 0 in (13.72 m)
- Wing area: 504 sq ft (46.8 m^{2})
- Gross weight: 5,800 lb (2,640 kg)
- Powerplant: 1 × Pratt & Whitney Hornet , 525 hp (390 kW)

Performance

- Maximum speed: 120 mph (190 km/h, 100 kn)
- Service ceiling: 14,000 ft (4,300 m)
