= Jake Swirbul =

American aviation pioneer (1898–1960)

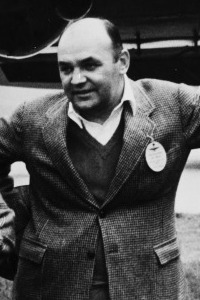
Swirbul in 1940

Leon Albert "Jake" "The Bullfrog" Swirbul (March 18, 1898 – June 28, 1960), was an aviation pioneer and co-founder of Grumman Aircraft Engineering Corporation.

== Biography ==
Swirbul was born in the Yorkville section of Manhattan. His parents Frederiks Zvirbulis and Lena (Dannenberga) Zvirbule were immigrants from Latvia. His family moved to Long Island when he was a child. He grew up in Sag Harbor and graduated from Pierson High School. He attended Cornell University until 1917 when he left school to enlist in the U.S. Marine Corps.

Jake Swirbul and Leroy Grumman met in 1924 at Loening Aeronautical Engineering Co. in New York City, one of the many small aircraft firms that sprang up after World War I. When the firm's Manhattan factory was closed after its sale to Keystone Aircraft in 1929, Swirbul and Grumman decided to form their own company. Grumman mortgaged his house to contribute $16,875, and Swirbul contributed $8,125. Two other Loening employees, William Schwendler and Edmund Ward Poor, contributed a little and former Wall Street banker E. Clinton Towl made up the fifth employee of Grumman Aircraft Engineering Corporation, formed January 2, 1930. Swirbul was the production manager, who understood the dynamics of mass production. He was responsible for the huge output of World War II and was equally adept in ramping down production at the end of the war to ensure the company's survival. Jake found his solutions on a personal, rather than an abstract level. He was always known as a hands on manager who could get the most out of his workers while treating them with friendship and respect. While Roy Grumman was always referred to as "Mr. Grumman", Jake was always Jake and could be seen out on the shop floor conversing with his men, while checking progress. Grumman was the only manufacturer to start the 1950s in the black. Jake Swirbul died of pneumonia while ill with colon cancer on June 28, 1960, shortly after Grumman began work on the Gemini program and one month after the roll-out ceremony for the A-6 Intruder.

The Swirbul Library at Adelphi University is named in his honor.
