= Loening =

Defunct American aircraft manufacturer

Loening Aeronautical Engineering Corporation
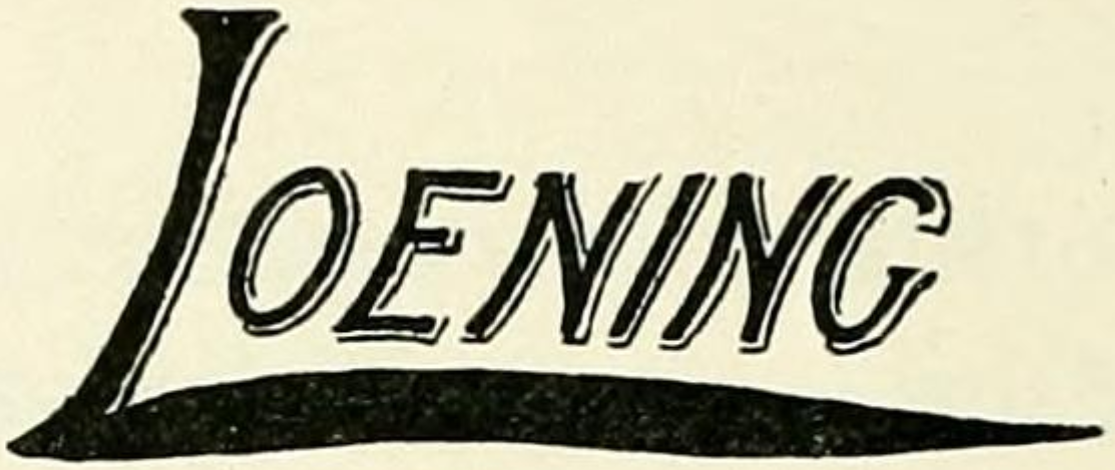

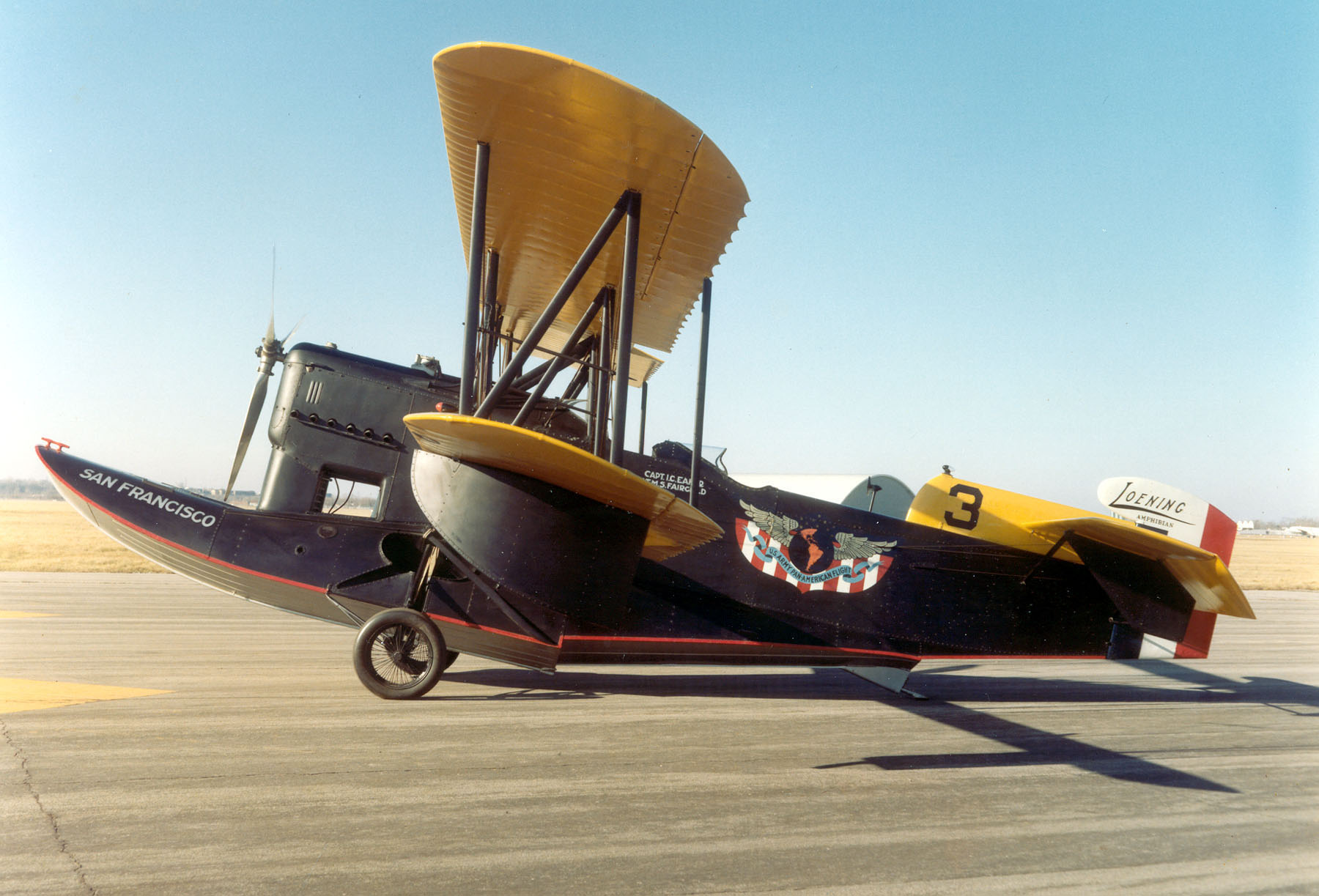
- Loening OA-1A
- Industry: Aerospace
- Founded: 1917
- Founder: Grover Loening
- Defunct: 1928
- Fate: Merged with Keystone Aircraft in 1928
- Successor: Keystone-Loening

The Loening Aeronautical Engineering Corporation was founded in 1917 by Grover Loening and produced early aircraft and amphibious aircraft. After it merged with Keystone Aircraft Corporation in 1928, some of its engineers left to form Grumman and Grover Loening went on to form a new enterprise, Grover Loening Aircraft Company.

== History ==
In 1917, Grover Loening incorporated the Loening Aeronautical Engineering Company in New York City. The company was originally located in Long Island City, Queens. It later moved into a loft on the fifth floor at 351 West 52nd Street in the Hell's Kitchen neighborhood of Manhattan. In 1921, the firm leased a vacant lot at 420-428 East 31st Street in the Kips Bay neighborhood of Manhattan, located on the block between First Avenue and the East River, and built a new factory on the site. The new plant on East 31st Street opened in 1922. The company built a floating ramp for amphibian planes alongside the pier at the end of 31st Street—which it leased from the city—that enabled aircraft to taxi in and out of the water. Before this, aircraft from the factory were brought out to the pier and had to be hoisted into the East River using a crane.

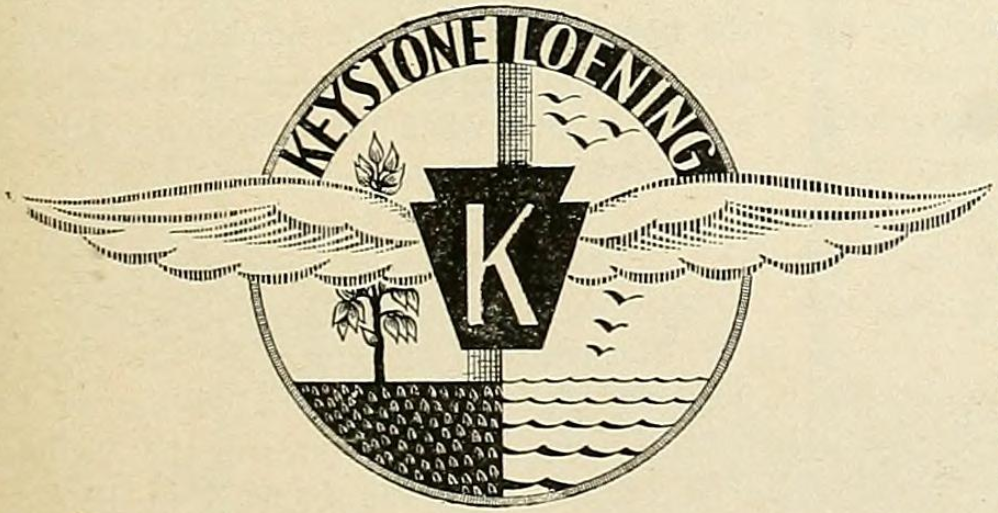
Logo used in 1929 advertisement following the merger

In 1928, Loening merged with Keystone Aircraft Corporation and functioned independently as the Loening Aeronautical Division. The following year, the unit became the Keystone-Loening Division of Curtiss-Wright. With the planned closure of Loening's factory in New York City and a move of its operations to Keystone's plant in Bristol, Pennsylvania, several of Leoning's employees—including Leroy Grumman, Jake Swirbul and William Schwendler—decided to remain in New York and formed their own company on Long Island, the Grumman Aircraft Engineering Corporation. In 1929, Grover Loening went on to establish a new firm on Long Island, the Grover Loening Aircraft Company in Garden City, which operated until 1936.

== Aircraft ==
Model name	First flight	Number built	Type
Loening Monoplane Flying Boat			
Loening M-2 Kitten	1918	3	Convertible amphibian monoplane
Loening M-8	1918	55	Monoplane fighter
Loening PW-2	1920	7	Monoplane fighter
Loening Model 23	1921	16	Monoplane pusher engine flying boat
Loening R-4	1922	2	Monoplane racer
Loening PA-1	1922	1	Biplane fighter
Loening OL	1923	165	Biplane flying boat
Loening C-1	1928	8	Biplane flying boat
Loening C-2	1928	36	Biplane flying boat
Loening XSL	1931	1	Submarine-based monoplane pusher engine flying boat
Loening C-5	1934	1	Development of XSL
Loening XFL	N/A	0	Unbuilt carrier-based fighter

== See also ==
- List of military aircraft of the United States
