= William T. Schwendler =

Chairman of Grumman Corporation (1904-1978)

William T. Schwendler (April 1, 1904 - January 15, 1978 in Farmingdale, New York) was a founder, chief engineer, executive vice-president and Chairman of the Board of the Grumman Corporation. He and other founders of Grumman had worked together at Loening Aeronautical Engineering until leaving to form their new company in a rented garage in December 1929.

The son of a German immigrant father, Schwendler was a 1924 graduate of New York University where he was one of the school's first students of aeronautical engineering. In 1956, Schwendler became a trustee of NYU. He was a member of Phi Kappa Tau fraternity at NYU and is a charter member of the fraternity's Hall of Fame.

He resided until his death on a 6-acre (24,000 m^{2}) estate on Merritts Road in Farmingdale, New York, adjacent to the Bethpage State Park Golf Course.
