= Martin XLB-4 =

1920s proposed American bomber

XLB-4

General information
- Type: Medium bomber
- Manufacturer: Martin
- Status: Paper project only
- Number built: 0

The Martin XLB-4 was a 1920s proposal for a light bomber by the Glenn L. Martin Company.

== Design and development ==
The XLB-4 would have been a biplane bomber of all metal construction, powered by two Pratt & Whitney R-1690 Hornet radial engines. The United States Army Air Corps (USAAC) ordered a single prototype serialled 27-332, but the aircraft was cancelled because the USAAC leadership was indifferent about experimenting with all-metal aircraft.

== Specifications (XLB-4 estimated) ==
General characteristics

- Crew: 5
- Length: 44 ft 8 in (13.61 m)
- Wingspan: 76 ft (23 m)
- Height: 16 ft 7 in (5.06 m)
- Wing area: 1,203.0 sq ft (111.76 m^{2})
- Empty weight: 5,891 lb (2,672 kg)
- Gross weight: 11,982 lb (5,435 kg)
- Powerplant: 2 × Pratt & Whitney R-1690 Hornet 9-cylinder air-cooled radial piston engines, 525 hp (391 kW) each

Performance

- Maximum speed: 69 mph (111 km/h, 60 kn)
- Wing loading: 9.98 lb/sq ft (48.7 kg/m^{2})

== See also ==
Related development

- Huff-Daland XHB-1

Aircraft of comparable role, configuration, and era

- Curtiss B-2 Condor
- Fokker XLB-2
- Huff-Daland XHB-1
- Sikorsky S-37

Related lists

- List of bomber aircraft
- List of military aircraft of the United States
