= Curtiss B-2 Condor =

1929 bomber aircraft family by Curtiss

B-2 Condor
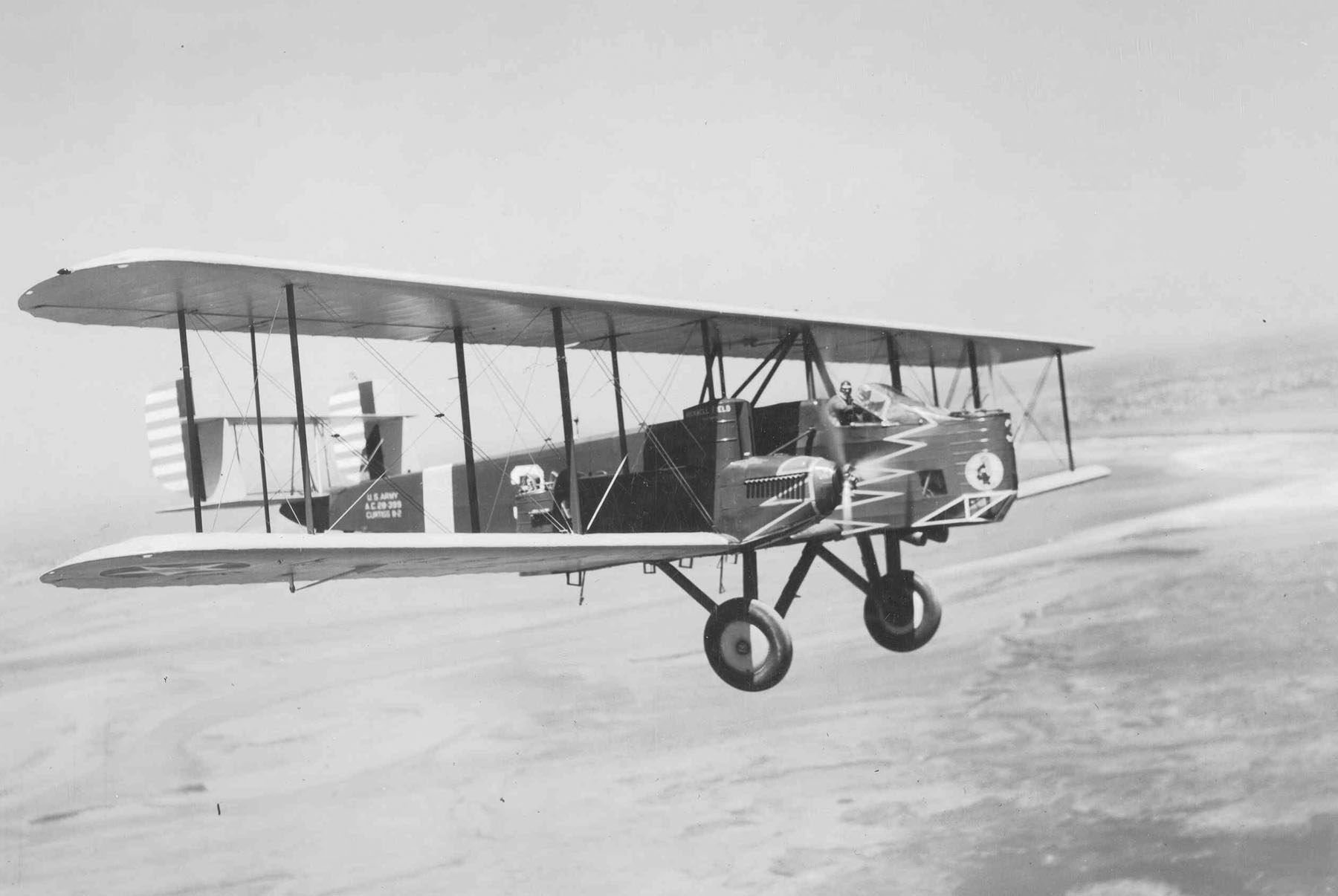

General information
- Type: Heavy bomber
- Manufacturer: Curtiss Aeroplane and Motor Company
- Status: No known survivors
- Primary user: United States Army Air Corps
- Number built: 13

History
- Manufactured: 1929-1930
- Introduction date: 1929
- Retired: 1934
- Developed into: T-32 Condor II

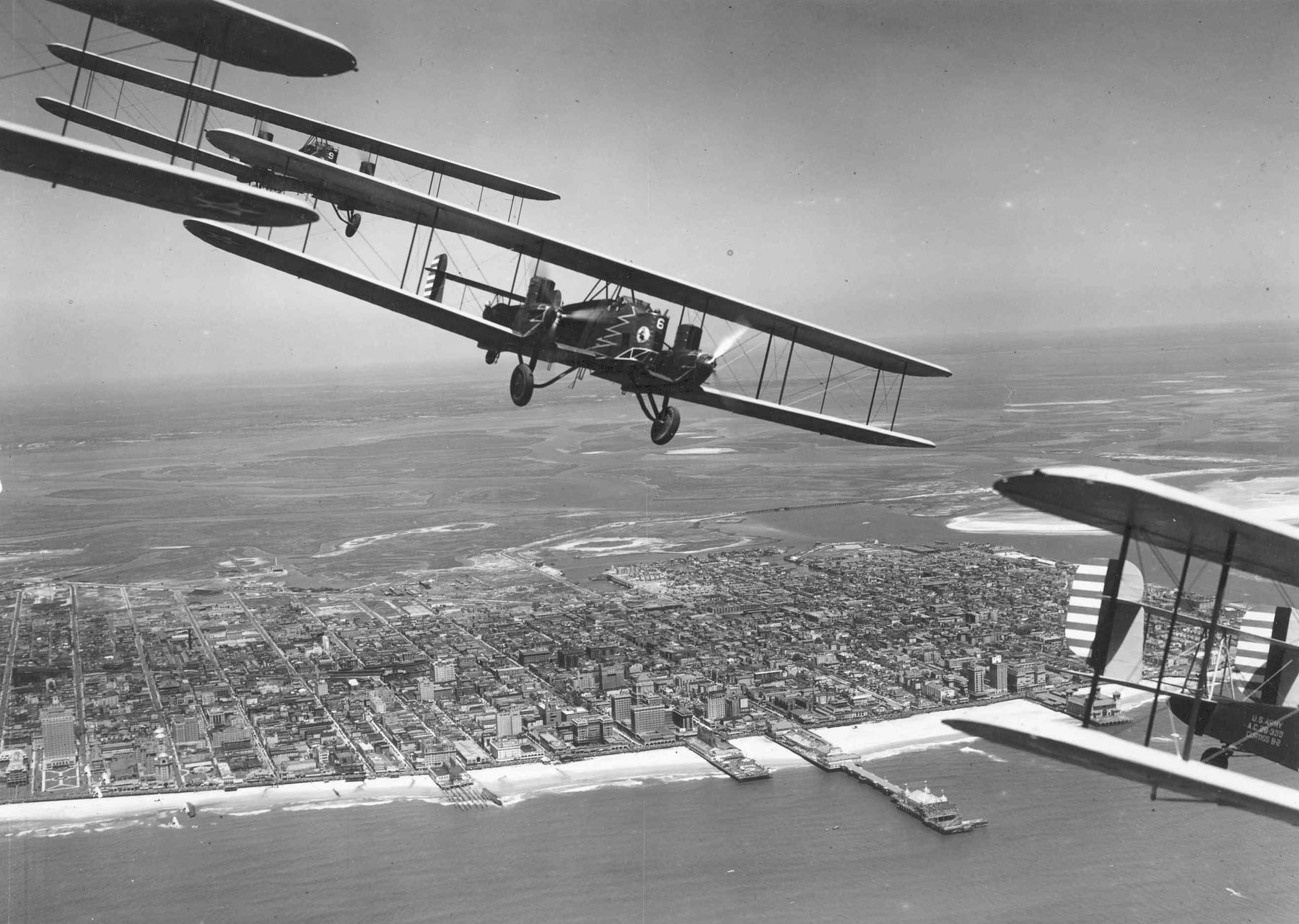
Curtiss B-2 Condor formation flight over Atlantic City, N.J. S/N 28-399 is in the foreground (tail section only). Aircraft were assigned to 11th Bombardment Squadron, 7th Bombardment Group at Rockwell Field, California. This flight of 4 aircraft completed cross-country flight to Atlantic City, NJ

The Curtiss B-2 Condor was a 1920s United States bomber aircraft. It was a descendant of the Martin NBS-1, which was built by the Curtiss Aeroplane and Motor Company for the Glenn L. Martin Company. There were a few differences, such as stronger materials and different engines, but they were relatively minor.

== Development ==
The B-2 was a large fabric-covered biplane aircraft. Its two engines sat in nacelles between the wings, flanking the fuselage. It had a twin set of rudders with twin horizontal stabilizers, a configuration which was becoming obsolete by that time. At the rear of each nacelle was a gunner position. In previous planes, the back-facing gunners had been in the fuselage, but their view there was obstructed. A similar arrangement (using nacelle-mounted gun platforms) was adopted in the competing Keystone XB-1 aircraft.

The XB-2 competed for a United States Army Air Corps production contract with the similar Keystone XB-1, Sikorsky S-37, and Fokker XLB-2. The other three were immediately ruled out, but the Army board appointed to make the contracts was strongly supportive of the smaller Keystone XLB-6, which cost a third as much as the B-2. Furthermore, the B-2 was large for the time and difficult to fit into existing hangars. However, the superior performance of the XB-2 soon wrought a policy change, and in 1928 a production run of 12 was ordered.

One modified B-2, dubbed the B-2A, featured dual controls for both the pilot and the copilot. Previously, the control wheel and the pitch controls could only be handled by one person at a time. This "dual control" setup became standard on all bombers by the 1930s. There was no production line for the B-2A. The B-2 design was also used as a transport.

The B-2 was quickly made obsolete by technological advances of the 1930s, and served only briefly with the Army Air Corps, being removed from service by 1934. Following production of the B-2, Curtiss Aircraft left the bomber business, and concentrated on the Hawk series of pursuit aircraft in the 1930s.

== Variants ==
Model 52
Company designation of the B-2.
XB-2
Prototype.
B-2
Twin-engined heavy bomber biplane. Initial production version; 12 built.
B-2A
Redesignation of one B-2 fitted with dual controls.
Model 53 Condor 18
Civil version of the B-2. Six built.

== Military operators ==
United States

- US Army Air Corps
  - 7th Bombardment Group, Rockwell Field, California
    - 11th Bomb Squadron - operated 1928–1931

== Specifications (B-2) ==
Data from Curtiss aircraft : 1907–1947

General characteristics

- Crew: 5
- Length: 47 ft 4 in (14.43 m)
- Wingspan: 90 ft 0 in (27.43 m)
- Airfoil: root: Curtiss C-72; tip: Curtiss C-72
- Empty weight: 9,300 lb (4,218 kg)
- Gross weight: 16,951 lb (7,689 kg)
- Powerplant: 2 × Curtiss GV-1570-7 Conqueror V-12 water-cooled piston engine, 600 hp (450 kW) each

Performance

- Maximum speed: 132 mph (212 km/h, 115 kn)
- Cruise speed: 105.5 mph (169.8 km/h, 91.7 kn)
- Range: 805 mi (1,296 km, 700 nmi)
- Service ceiling: 17,100 ft (5,200 m)
- Rate of climb: 850 ft/min (4.3 m/s)

Armament

- Guns: 6 × 0.30 in (7.62 mm) Lewis machine-guns
- Bombs: 2,508 lb (1,138 kg) of bombs.

== See also ==
Related development

- Martin NBS-1

Aircraft of comparable role, configuration, and era

- Fokker XLB-2
- Huff-Daland XB-1
- Huff-Daland XHB-1
- Keystone LB-7
- Sikorsky S-37

Related lists

- List of military aircraft of the United States
- List of bomber aircraft

== Bibliography ==
- Bowers, Peter M. Curtiss Aircraft 1907-1947. London: Putnam & Company, 1979. ISBN 0-370-10029-8.
