= Huff-Daland HD.8A Petrel =

1920s American civil transport aircraft

HD.8A Petrel
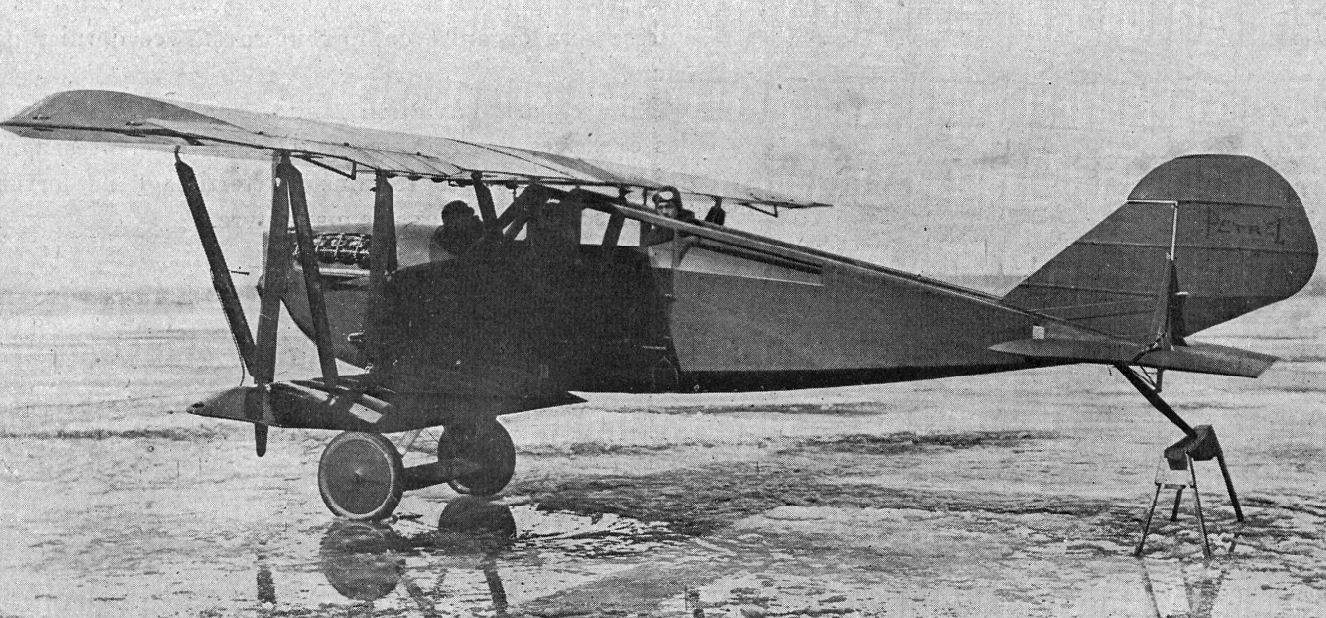
- HD-8A Petrel

General information
- Type: Small civil transport
- National origin: U.S.
- Manufacturer: Huff-Daland
- Number built: about 3

History
- First flight: 1922

The Huff-Daland HD.8A was a small civil transport biplane carrying two passengers built in the U.S. in 1922. The otherwise identical HD-9A offered an alternative engine.

== Design and development ==
The Petrel was a biplane with thick section, fabric covered, rectangular plan wings built around twin ply spars. The lower wing was both shorter and narrower and the upper wing carried overhung ailerons reminiscent of the Fokker D.VII. The struttage was also similar to that of the Fokker, with outward-leaning N-struts outboard and pairs of rearward and outward-leaning short struts from the upper and lower fuselage on each side.

Its water-cooled, upright Curtiss OX-5 V-8 was conventionally mounted in the nose with its radiator ahead of the cylinder block and fuel tanks in the leading edges of the upper wing. The fuselage behind it closely followed that of the earlier HD-4 Bridget, which had been test-flown for a year. It was flat-sided and parallel in plan, with two conventional lower longerons but upper longerons which rose from the extreme rear to join the rear cabane struts on the rear spar. The fuselage sides were fabric-covered only up to horizontal false longerons; the gap between the sloping, true longerons was also fabric-covered. The pilot and two passengers occupied a single, open cockpit in tandem, with the pilot at the back. Access was via rear doors, one on each side. At the rear the fuselage tapered in profile to a horizontal crossmember between the ends of the sloping upper longerons which mounted the elevators and the trailing edge of the tailplane. In plan the horizontal tail was almost trapezoidal. The crossmember also located the rudder post of a generous, rounded balanced rudder mounted on a triangular fin.

The Petrel's landing gear had fixed mainwheels and a tailskid. A pair of wire cross-braced V-struts mounted on the lower longerons were joined transversely by a pair of rods, one attached to the single axle by several shock-absorbing elastic rings.

== Variants ==
Data from L'Aéronautique and Aerofiles. Les Ailes has the HD-8A as Anzani-powered and vice versa.

HD-8A
as described. Probably three built, one with a 180 hp (130 kW) Wright-Hispano E V-12 engine.
HD-9A
unchanged from HD-8A apart from a 100 hp (75 kW), 10 cylinder Anzani 10 radial engine. One built.

== Specifications (HD-8A Petrel) ==
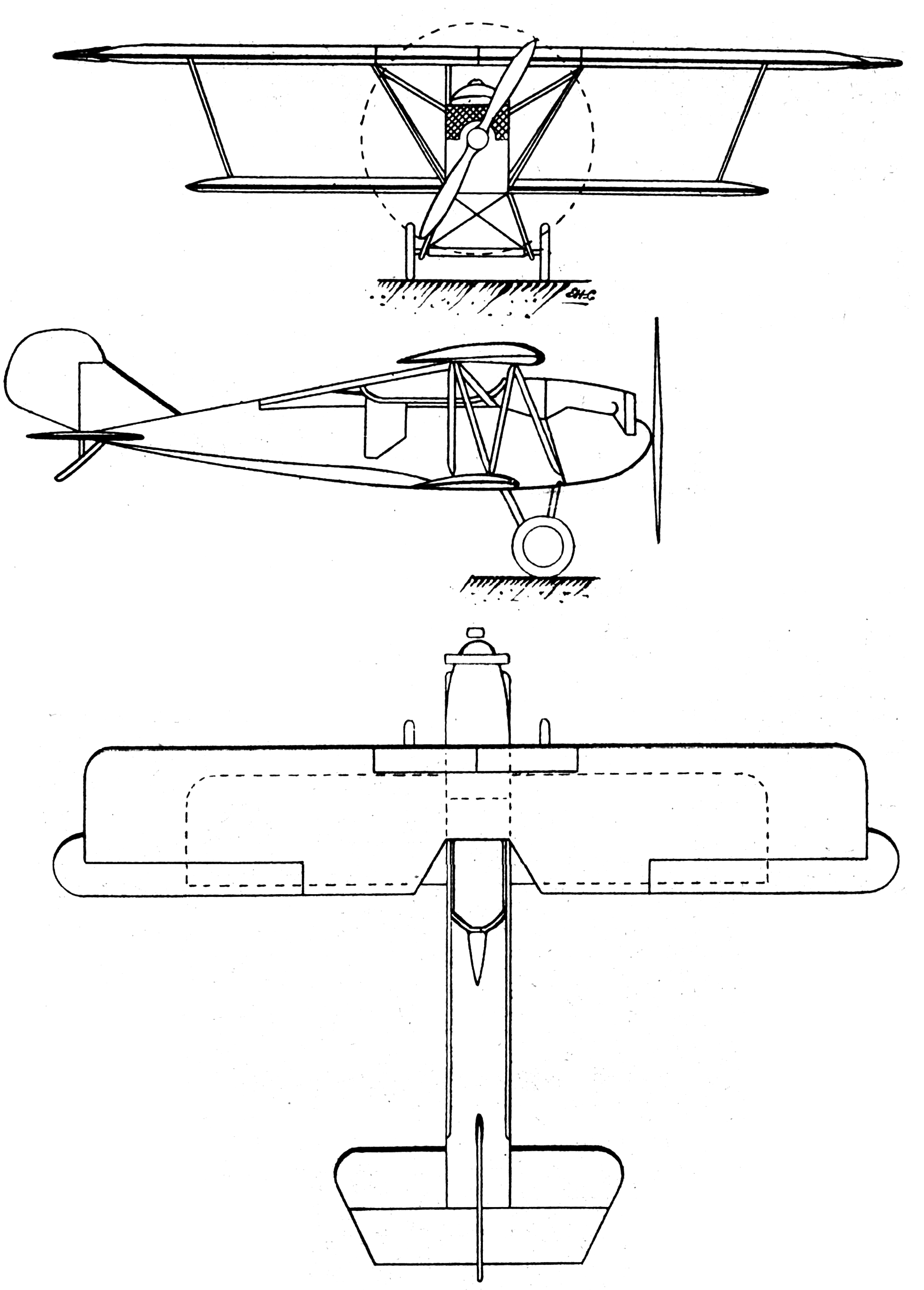

Data from Les Ailes, April 1922 except where noted

General characteristics

- Crew: one
- Capacity: two passengers
- Length: 24 ft 1 in (7.34 m)
- Upper wingspan: 29 ft 0 in (8.84 m) not including the balancing tips of the overhung ailerons.
- Lower wingspan: 21 ft 6 in (6.55 m)
- Height: 9 ft 0 in (2.74 m)
- Wing area: 259.2 sq ft (24.08 m^{2})
- Airfoil: Göttingen 347
- Empty weight: 1,120 lb (508 kg)
- Gross weight: 1,781 lb (808 kg)
- Fuel capacity: 26 US gal (22 imp gal; 98 L)
- Powerplant: 1 × Curtiss OX-5 water-cooled V-8, 90 hp (67 kW)
- Propellers: 2-bladed

Performance

- Maximum speed: 85 mph (136 km/h, 73 kn)
- Landing speed: 31 mph (50 km/h)
- Endurance: 2.5 hr
- Service ceiling: 10,200 ft (3,100 m)
- Rate of climb: 370 ft/min (1.9 m/s)
