= Martin NBS-1 =

American bomber aircraft in service 1920-1929

NBS-1
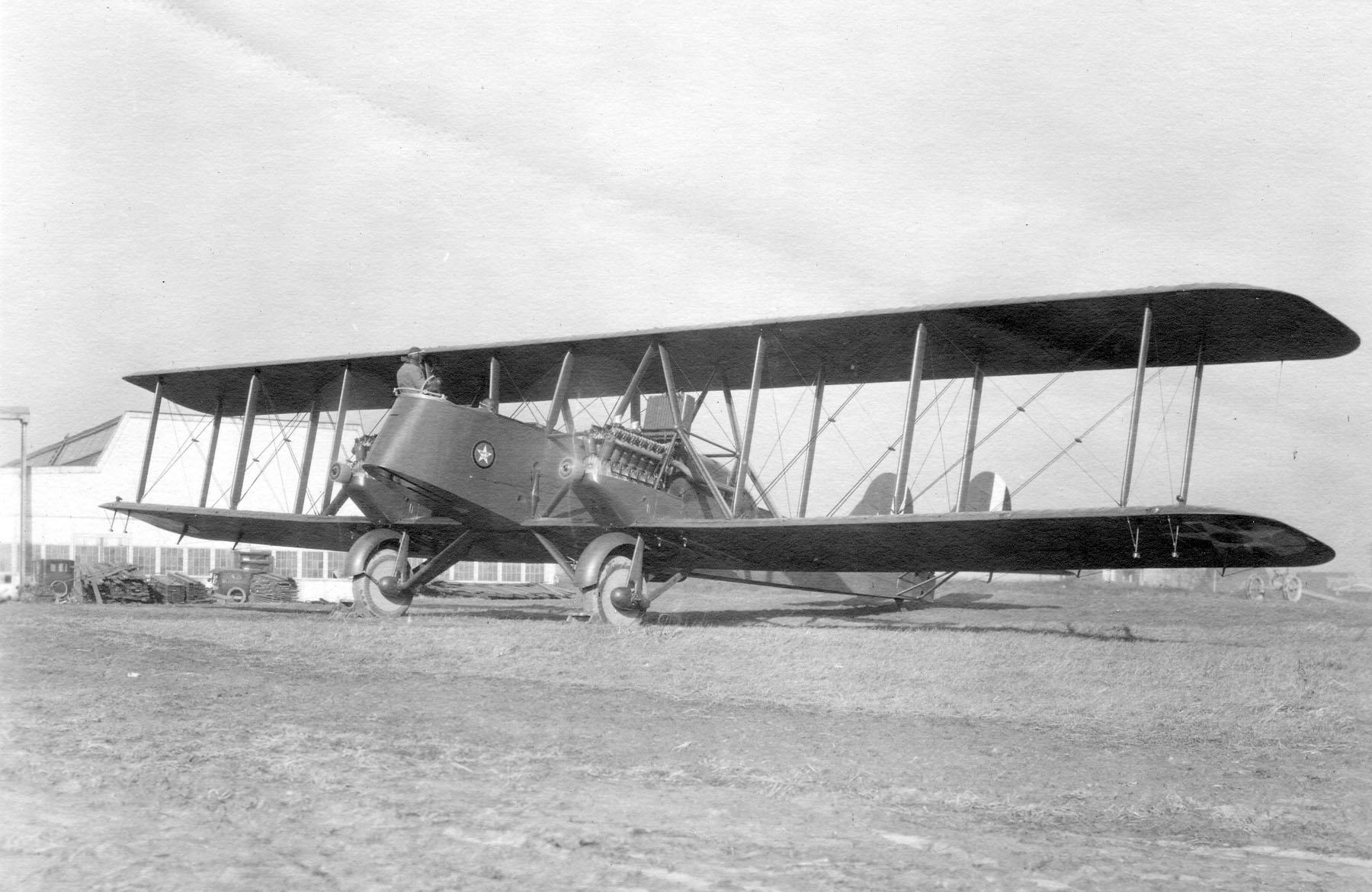

General information
- Type: Short-range night bomber
- Manufacturer: Glenn L. Martin Company
- Status: No known survivors
- Primary user: United States Army Air Service
- Number built: 130

History
- Manufactured: 1920–1922
- Introduction date: 1920
- First flight: 3 September 1920
- Retired: 1929

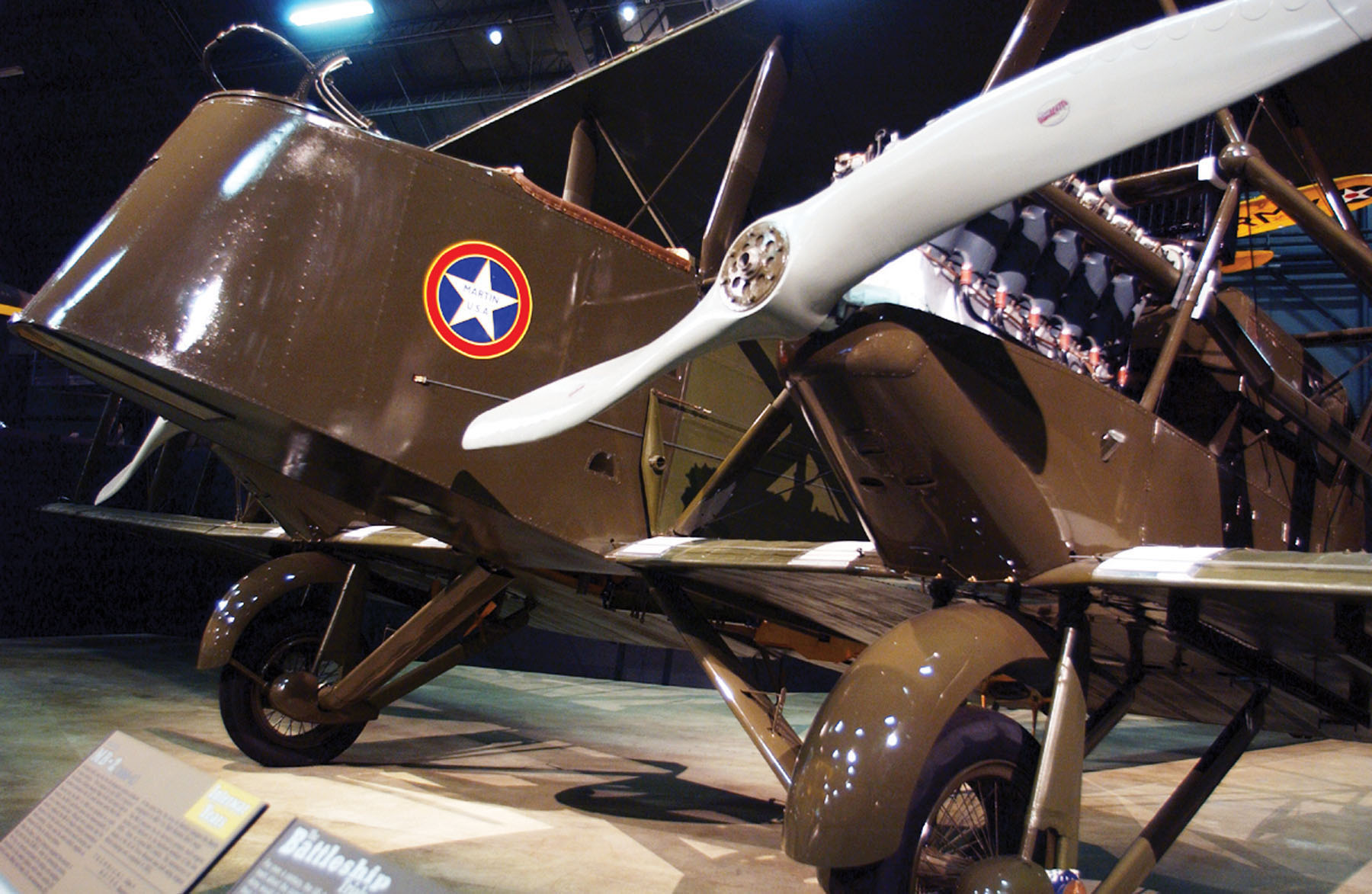
Full-scale reproduction of the Martin MB-2 on display at the National Museum of the United States Air Force

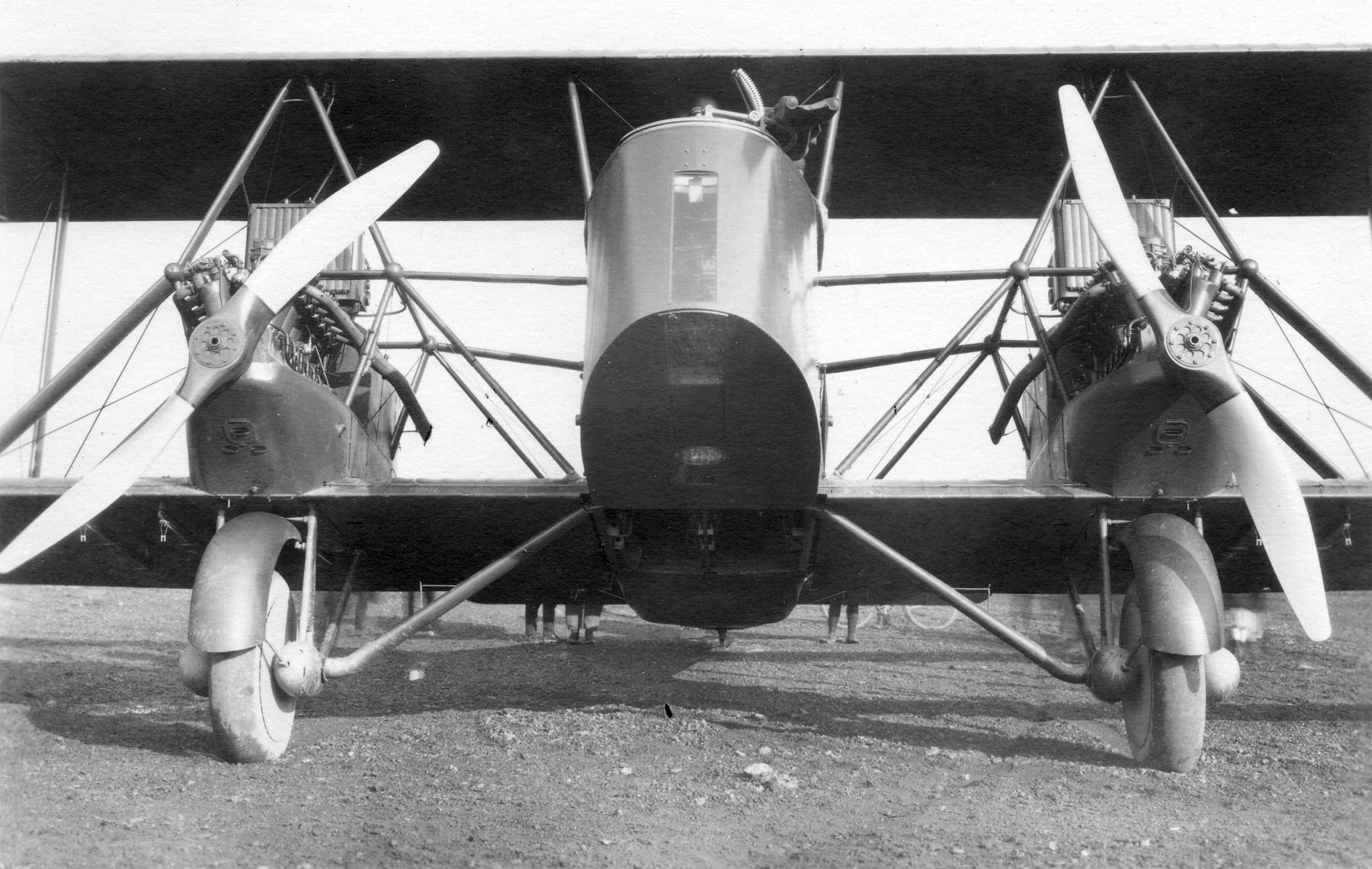

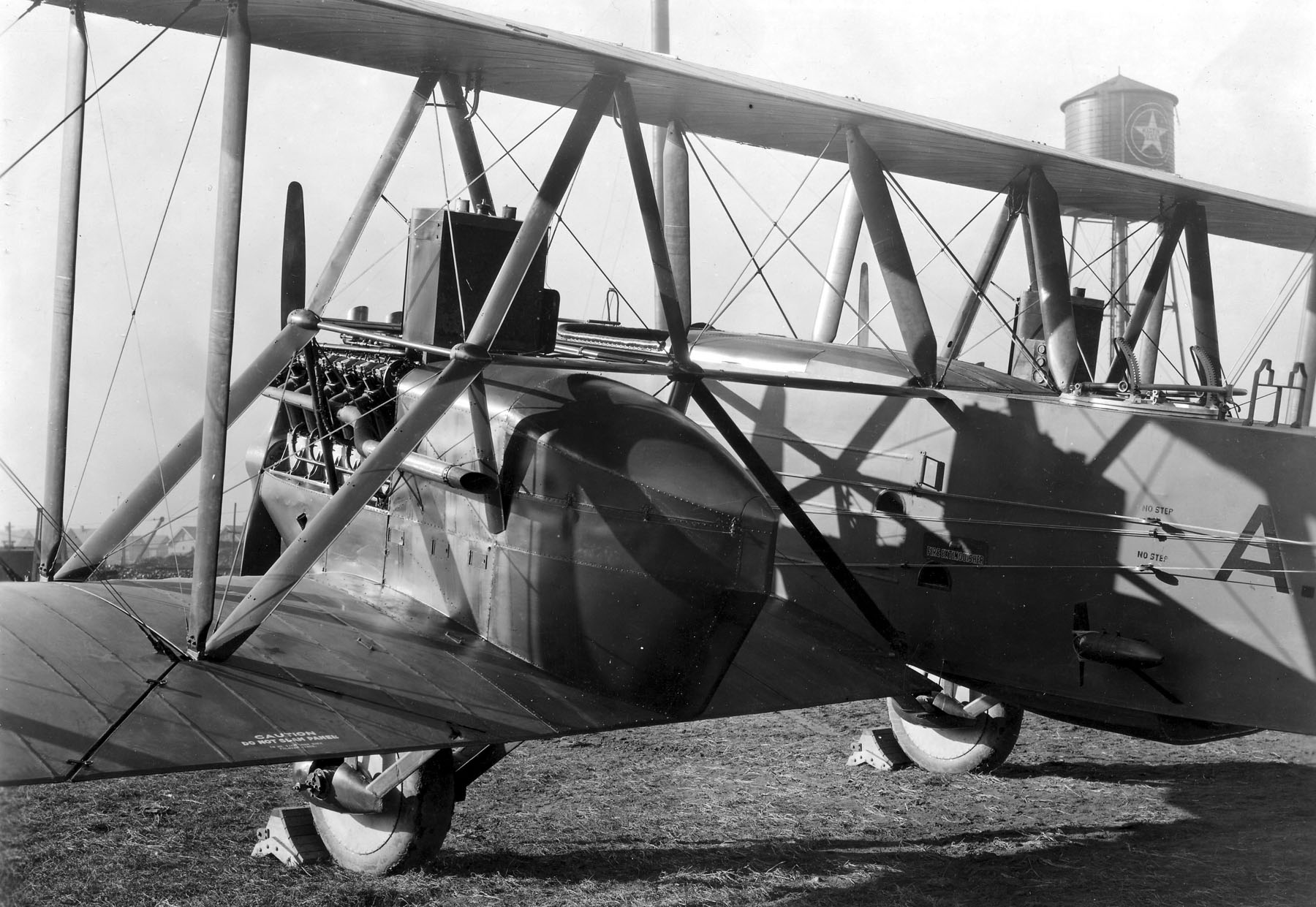

The Martin NBS-1 was a military aircraft of the United States Army Air Service and its successor, the Army Air Corps. An improved version of the Martin MB-1, a scout-bomber built during the final months of World War I, the NBS-1 was ordered under the designation MB-2 and is often referred to as such. The designation NBS-1, standing for "Night Bomber-Short Range", was adopted by the Air Service after the first five of the Martin bombers were delivered.

The NBS-1 became the standard frontline bomber of the Air Service in 1920 and remained so until its replacement in 1928–1929 by the Keystone Aircraft series of bombers. The basic MB-2 design was also the standard against which prospective U.S. Army bombers were judged until the production of the Martin B-10 in 1933.

== Design and development ==
The NBS-1 was a wood-and-fabric biplane without staggered wings, employing twin rudders on a twin vertical tail. Its two Liberty 12-A engines sat in nacelles on the lower wing, flanking the fuselage. Ordered under the company designation MB-2 in June 1920, the NBS-1 was an improved larger version of the Martin MB-1 bomber built by the Glenn L. Martin Company in 1918, also known as the GMB or Glenn Martin Bomber. The first flight of the MB-2 took place 3 September 1920.

In addition to more powerful engines, larger wings and fuselage, and simplified landing gear, the NBS-1 also had a unique folding wing system, hinged outside the engine nacelles to fold backward for storage in small hangars. Unlike the MB-1, whose engines were mounted between the wings in a fashion similar to the German Staaken R.VI Riesenflugzeug, the engines of the NBS-1 were fixed to the lower wing over the landing gear.

The MB-2 was designed as a night bomber and except for a greater load capacity, had reduced performance characteristics compared to its MB-1 predecessor. The first 20 (five MB-2s and 15 NBS-1s) were ordered from the Martin Company, which recommended a further 50 be produced to help its struggling financial condition. However the design was owned by the U.S. Army and subsequent contracts for 110 bombers were awarded by low bid to three other companies: Curtiss Aircraft (50 ordered); L-W-F Engineering Company of College Point, New York (35); and Aeromarine Plane and Motor Company of Keyport, New Jersey (25).

The engines of the last 20 bombers of the Curtiss order came equipped with turbosuperchargers manufactured by General Electric, the first such modification made in production quantity. Although enabling the NBS-1 to reach an altitude of over 25,000 ft (7,650 m), the turbosuperchargers were mechanically unreliable and not used operationally.

The bomber was equipped defensively with five .30 in (7.62 mm) Lewis guns, mounted in pairs in positions in the nose and upper rear fuselage, and singly in a bottom mount, firing behind and beneath the rear fuselage.

The first two Martin MB-2s, Air Service serials 64195 and 64196, were retained at McCook Field in Dayton, Ohio, for research and development flight testing, marked with project numbers 'P162' and 'P227' respectively, as was the second NBS-1, 64201, marked as 'P222'. Four Curtiss NBS-1s were also assigned to McCook.

== Operational history ==
The NBS-1 was the primary bomber used by Brigadier General Billy Mitchell during Project B, the demonstration bombing of naval ships in July 1921. Six NBS-1 bombers, led by Captain Walter Lawson of the 96th Squadron operating out of Langley Field, bombed and sank the captured German battleship SMS Ostfriesland on 21 July 1921, using specially developed 2,000 lb (907 kg) demolition bombs, externally mounted beneath the fuselage. They also sank USS Virginia (BB-13) and USS New Jersey (BB-16) in 1923.

An example of the plane was featured in director William Wellman's 1927 Paramount silent film Wings, disguised as a German Gotha bomber. Footage was shot overhead of the MB-2 as it exited its tent hangar and from the MB-2 during flight. These aerial shots were revolutionary at the time, showing the public a perspective of aerial combat from the pilots' point of view. Wings won the first-ever Academy Award for best picture.

== Operators ==
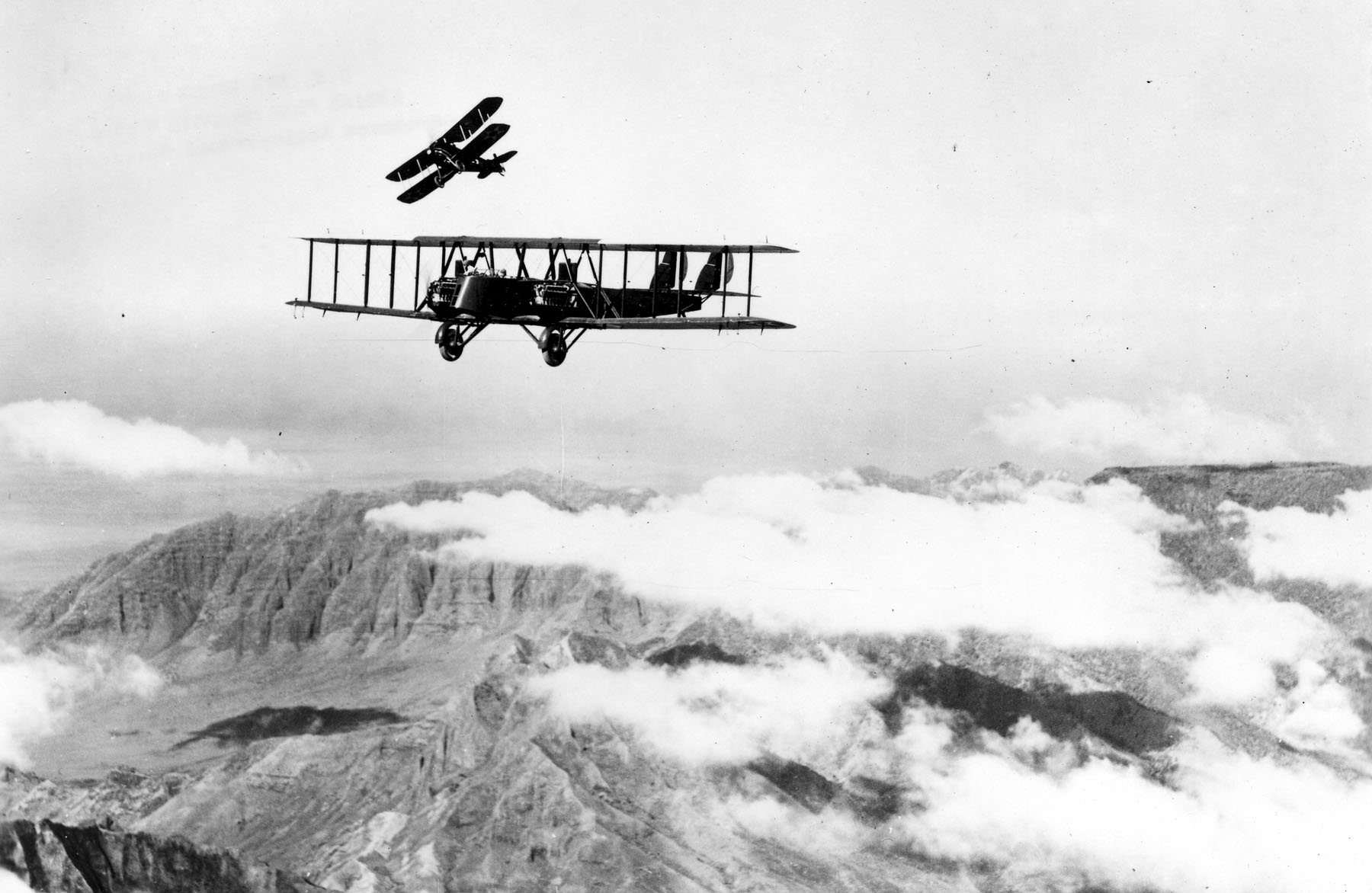
Martin MB-2 in flight with a pursuit aircraft practicing an attack

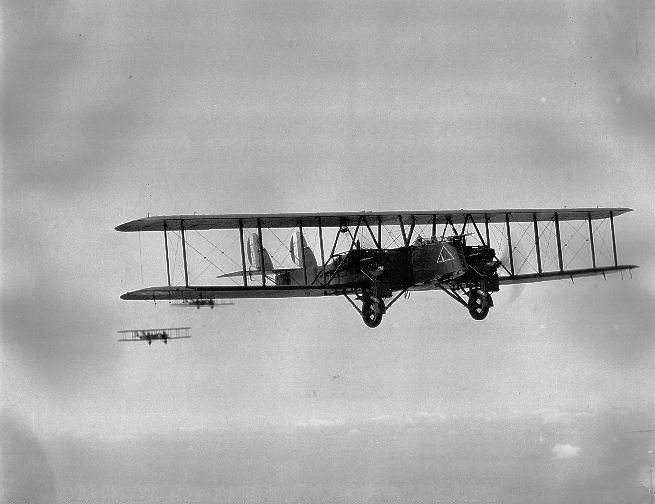
Trio of NBS-1s of 2nd Bomb Group

United States

- United States Army, Air Service and Air Corps
  - 1st Day Bombardment Group, Kelly Field, Texas (2nd Bombardment Group, Langley Field, Virginia)
    - 11th Bomb Squadron – operated MB-2 1920–1927
    - 20th Bomb Squadron – operated NBS-1 1920–1929
    - 49th Bomb Squadron – operated NBS-1 1920–1929
    - 96th Bomb Squadron – operated NBS-1 1920–1928
  - 4th Composite Group, Nichols Field, Luzon, Philippines
    - 28th Bomb Squadron – operated NBS-1 1924–1929
  - 5th Composite Group, Luke Field, Territory of Hawaii
    - 23d Bomb Squadron – operated NBS-1 1922–1929
    - 72d Bomb Squadron – operated NBS-1 1923–1929
  - 6th Composite Group, Albrook Field, Panama Canal Zone
    - 25th Bomb Squadron – operated NBS-1 1922–1929

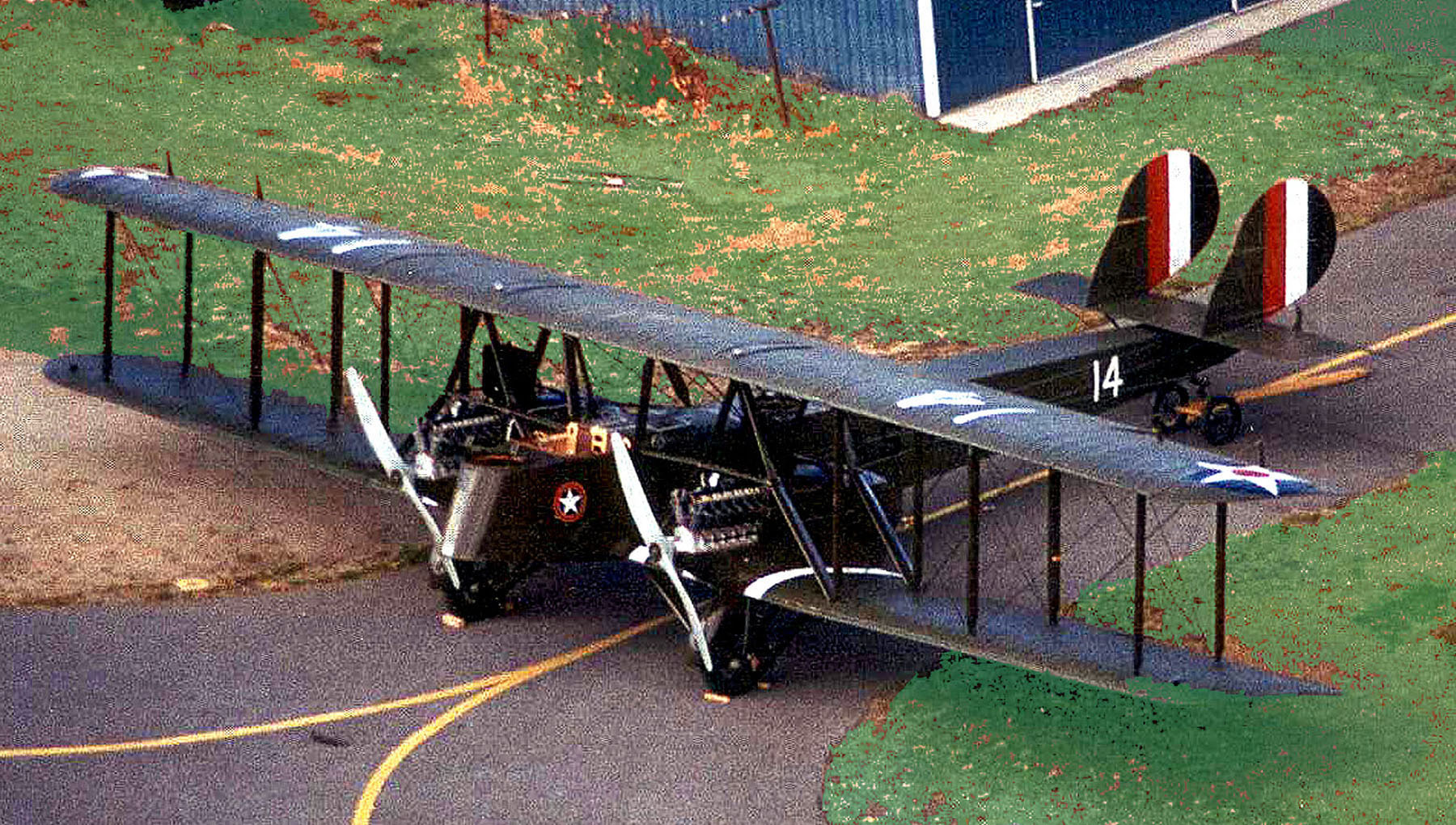
Reproduction of the Martin MB-2

== Surviving aircraft ==
There are no known surviving original Martin NBS-1 bombers, but in 2002 a full-scale reproduction, constructed from original drawings, went on display at the National Museum of the United States Air Force in Dayton, Ohio.

== Specifications (NBS-1) ==
General characteristics

- Crew: four
- Length: 42 ft 8 in (13.0 m)
- Wingspan: 74 ft 2 in (22.7 m)
- Height: 14 ft 8 in (4.8 m)
- Wing area: 1,121 sq ft (104.2 m^{2})
- Empty weight: 7,232 lb (3,280 kg)
- Gross weight: 12,027 lb (5,460 kg)
- Powerplant: 2 × Liberty 12-A liquid-cooled V12 engine, 420 hp (325 kW) each

Performance

- Maximum speed: 99 mph (160 km/h, 85 kn)
- Cruise speed: 92 mph (150 km/h, 80 kn)
- Range: 400 mi (650 km, 345 nmi)
- Service ceiling: 7,700 ft (2,350 m)
- Rate of climb: 391 ft/min (2.0 m/s)

Armament

- Guns: 5 × .30 in (7.62 mm) Lewis machine guns
- Bombs: 1,800 lb (820 kg) internal, or 2,000 lb (907 kg) external

== See also ==
Related development

- Martin MB-1

Aircraft of comparable role, configuration, and era

- Curtiss B-2 Condor
- Huff-Daland XB-1

Related lists

- List of military aircraft of the United States
- List of bomber aircraft
