= AAM-N-4 Oriole =

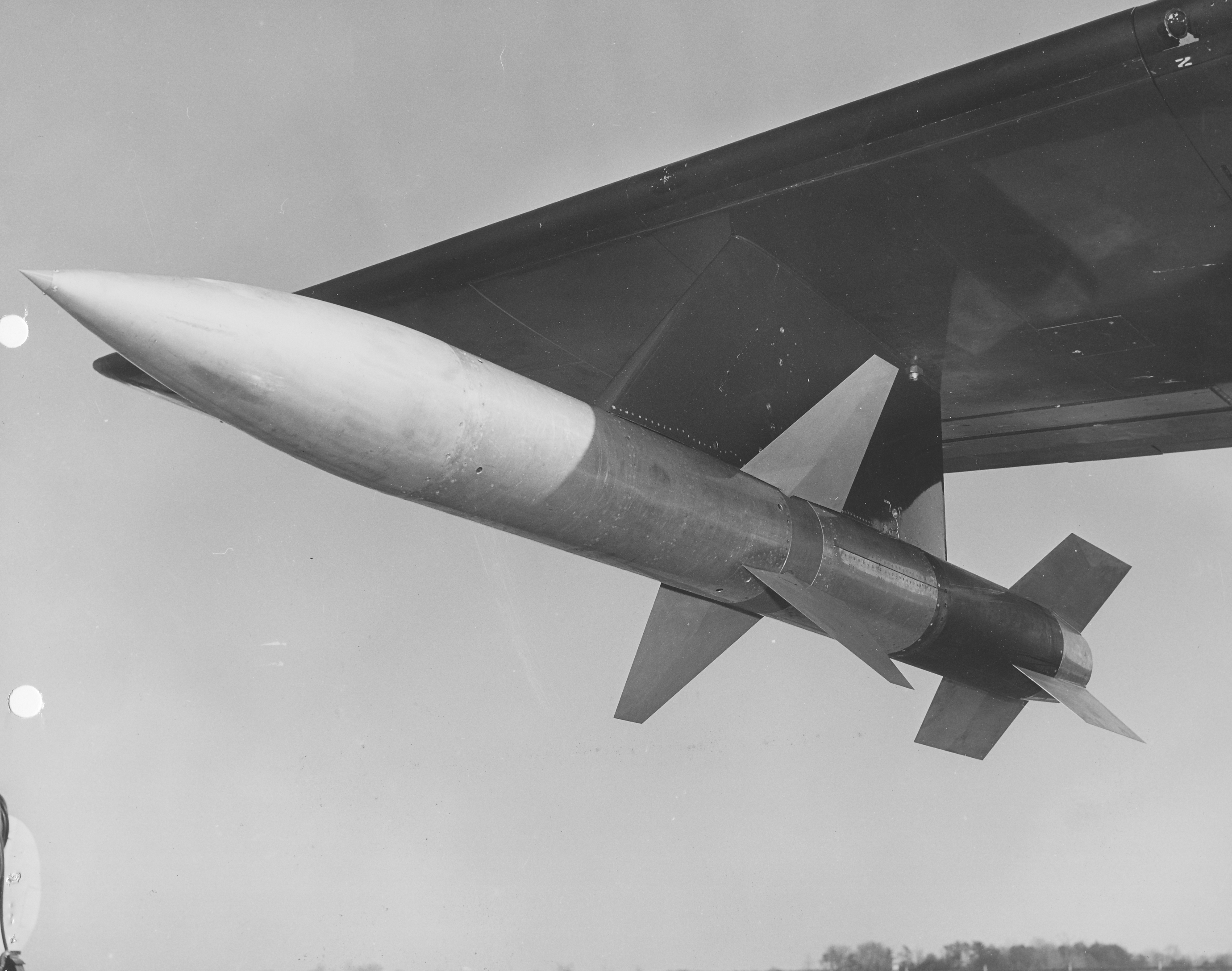
- Type: Air-to-air missile
- Place of origin: United States

Service history
- In service: 1950–1955
- Used by: United States Navy

Production history
- Designed: 1947
- Manufacturer: Martin

Specifications
- Mass: 1,500 pounds (680 kg)
- Length: 11 feet 7 inches (3.53 m)
- Diameter: 11 inches (280 mm)
- Wingspan: 3 ft 2.8 in (0.986 m)
- Warhead: High explosive
- Warhead weight: 25 pounds (11 kg)
- Operational range: 10 miles (16 km)
- Flight altitude: Max at launch, 10 miles (16 km)
- Maximum speed: Mach 2.5
- Guidance system: Active radar homing

The AAM-N-4 Oriole was an early American air-to-air missile, developed by the Glenn L. Martin Company for the United States Navy. Designed for launch from carrier-based aircraft, the missile programme was cancelled before flight testing began, and the missiles produced were utilized as test vehicles.

== Design and development ==
Development of the AAM-N-4 Oriole began in 1947, when a development contract was awarded by the United States Navy's Bureau of Ordnance to the Glenn L. Martin Company to develop a heavy air-to-air missile, utilizing active radar homing for fire and forget operation, for launch from aircraft operating from aircraft carriers. Oriole was intended to utilize a rocket or rocket-ramjet propulsion system; the intended range of the weapon was 20 miles (32 km), however as tested it was limited to a range of approximately 10 miles (16 km). Ready for launch, the missile weighed 1,500 pounds (680 kg), and used cruciform fins at the missile's midbody and at the tail for flight control. Flight speed was originally intended to be above Mach 3.

In 1948, the Oriole contract was redefined to be a guidance development program instead of a project to develop an operational missile; the program to construct test vehicles resumed in 1950 for research and development purposes, the missiles being redesignated RTV-N-16. Flight testing began shortly thereafter at the Naval Air Missile Test Center at Point Mugu, California; testing continued through 1953, with 56 flight tests being conducted throughout the program; as built the missile proved to be capable of Mach 2.5. The Oriole program was terminated at the end of 1953.
