= Collett E. Woolman =

American entrepreneur (1889–1966)

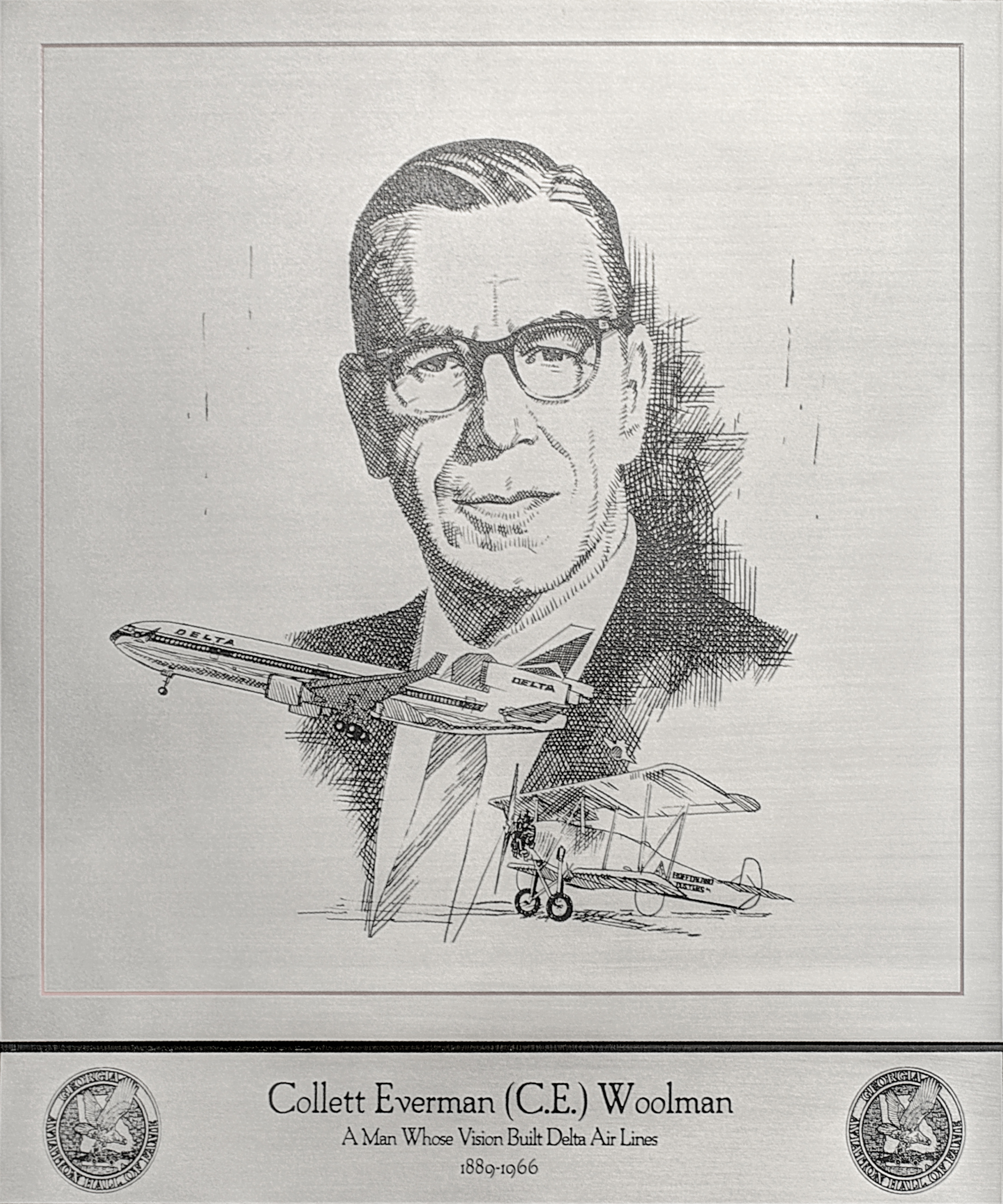
- Honorific plaque at the Georgia Aviation Hall of Fame
- Born: October 8, 1889; Bloomington, Indiana, U.S.
- Died: September 11, 1966 (aged 76); Houston, Texas, U.S.
- Other name: C. E. Woolman
- Education: University of Illinois
- Known for: Founding Delta Air Lines
- Spouse: Helen H. Fairfield
- Children: 2
- Awards: National Aviation Hall of Fame

Collett Everman Woolman (October 8, 1889 – September 11, 1966), commonly known as "C.E.", was an American airline entrepreneur best known as the principal founder and first CEO of Delta Air Lines.

== Biography ==
Woolman was born in Bloomington, Indiana, but grew up in Urbana, Illinois, where he attended high school. Between college semesters in 1909, Woolman attended the world's first aviation meet in Rheims, France, where his passion for aviation began. He graduated from the University of Illinois, where he received a Bachelor of Arts in agriculture. Woolman married Helen H. Fairfield in 1916 with whom he had two daughters. By 1920, they had moved to Monroe in northeastern Louisiana.

=== Early career ===
Shortly after graduating from college, Woolman became an Agricultural Extension Agent at Louisiana State University. At the time, the Southern United States was battling a cotton-destroying pest, the boll weevil. Woolman observed the work of entomologist B.R. Coad, at the United States Department of Agriculture lab in Tallulah, Louisiana. Coad and his team used airplanes and pilots on loan from the Army to develop improved methods of applying calcium arsenate to rid cotton plants of boll weevils. Huff-Daland Aero Corporation, an aircraft manufacturer, took notice of their experiments and decided to form a new subsidiary for crop dusting, founded on March 2, 1925 in Macon, Georgia. In May 1925, Woolman joined the new division, called Huff Daland Dusters, as chief entomologist responsible for selling this experimental service. That summer, the headquarters were moved to Monroe, Louisiana, and their fleet grew to 18 crop dusters, the largest private aircraft fleet at the time.

The need for crop dusting dramatically decreased when the summer growing season ended. To compensate, Woolman expanded dusting operations in early 1927 to Peru where the seasons are reversed from the U.S. While in Peru, Woolman began passenger air service in 1928, utilizing a unique agreement with Peruvian Airways Corporation. Although the arrangement did not last long, Woolman took the experience back to Louisiana.

=== Delta Air Service ===
Back in Monroe, the parent company, now known as Keystone Aircraft Corp. was seeking to sell off its subsidiary. Woolman and banker Travis Oliver led local investors to purchase Huff Daland Dusters assets. The new company was incorporated as Delta Air Service on December 3, 1928, named after the Mississippi Delta region it served. Woolman was vice president and general manager.

Passenger service began on June 17, 1929, from Dallas, Texas, to Jackson, Mississippi, with stops at Shreveport and Monroe, Louisiana. By June 1930, service had expanded east to Atlanta and west to Fort Worth, Texas.

Passenger operations ceased in October 1930 when the airmail contract for the route Delta had pioneered was awarded to another airline, which purchased the assets of Delta Air Service.

=== Delta Air Corporation ===
Local banker Travis Oliver (acting as trustee), Woolman, and other local investors purchased back the crop-dusting assets of Delta Air Service and incorporated as Delta Air Corporation on December 31, 1930. Woolman was a member of the board of directors for Delta Air Service, and again when Delta Air Corporation formed its board in 1930. Delta secured an airmail contract and returned to airline operations in 1934 doing business as Delta Air Lines over Mail Route 24, stretching from Fort Worth, Texas, to Charleston, South Carolina.

=== Delta Air Lines ===
The company name officially changed to Delta Air Lines in 1945. Although Delta kept a crop-dusting division until 1966, by 1938 expanding airmail and passenger service operations began earning more than crop-dusting profits.

Over the next several decades, Woolman led Delta as general manager, becoming president in 1945. He was named Delta's chairman and chief executive officer on November 1, 1965, and remained in those roles until his death. Woolman died on September 11, 1966, in Houston, a month before his 77th birthday.

== Legacy ==
A retired Delta pilot recalled one encounter with Woolman:

One additional gentleman and his wife were traveling in first class ATL-DCA with a stop in CLT while I was a brand new Flight Engineer on a DC-7. After landing in CLT, the agent came and told the Captain that we were oversold and he had to take one passenger off. The gentleman standing in the cockpit talking with us told the agent that he would give up his seat and take the early flight out the next morning to DCA. After leaving the cockpit and going back to tell his wife, he got off and stood by the gate (chain link fence actually). After starting those big old Wright 3350's I leaned forward and looked out of the Captain's window to see Mr. C. E. Woolman, Principal Founder and President of Delta Air Lines, standing there waving goodbye to us.

Following his death, several memorials have been made in his honor. A reconditioned 1925 Huff Daland Duster was presented to the Smithsonian Institution by employees of Delta. Another memorial sits at the entrance to Delta's Technical Operations Center in Atlanta. In 1992, Woolman was inducted into the Georgia Aviation Hall of Fame. In 1994, he was enshrined in the National Aviation Hall of Fame.
