= Martin XNBL-2 =

American bomber proposal

General information
- Type: Biplane night bomber
- National origin: United States
- Manufacturer: Glenn Martin Company
- Primary user: United States Army Air Service
- Number built: 0

The Martin XNBL-2 was a 1920s biplane night light bomber proposal by the Glenn Martin Company for the United States Army Air Service. Two prototypes were ordered in 1922, but cancelled before construction began, due to lack of funding.

== Specifications ==
Data from Wagner, 2004

General characteristics

- Crew: four
- Length: 53 ft (16 m)
- Wingspan: 98 ft 2 in (29.92 m)
- Wing area: 3,000 sq ft (280 m^{2})
- Empty weight: 14,704 lb (6,670 kg)
- Gross weight: 26,190 lb (11,880 kg)
- Powerplant: 2 × Engineering Division W-1 engines, 700 hp (520 kW) each

Performance

- Maximum speed: 95 mph (153 km/h, 83 kn)
- Service ceiling: 9,000 ft (2,700 m)

Armament

- Guns: 5x 0.3 in (7.62 mm) machine-guns
- Bombs: 1,907 lb (865.0 kg)
