= Huff-Daland =

American aircraft manufacturer

Huff-Daland Aero Corporation
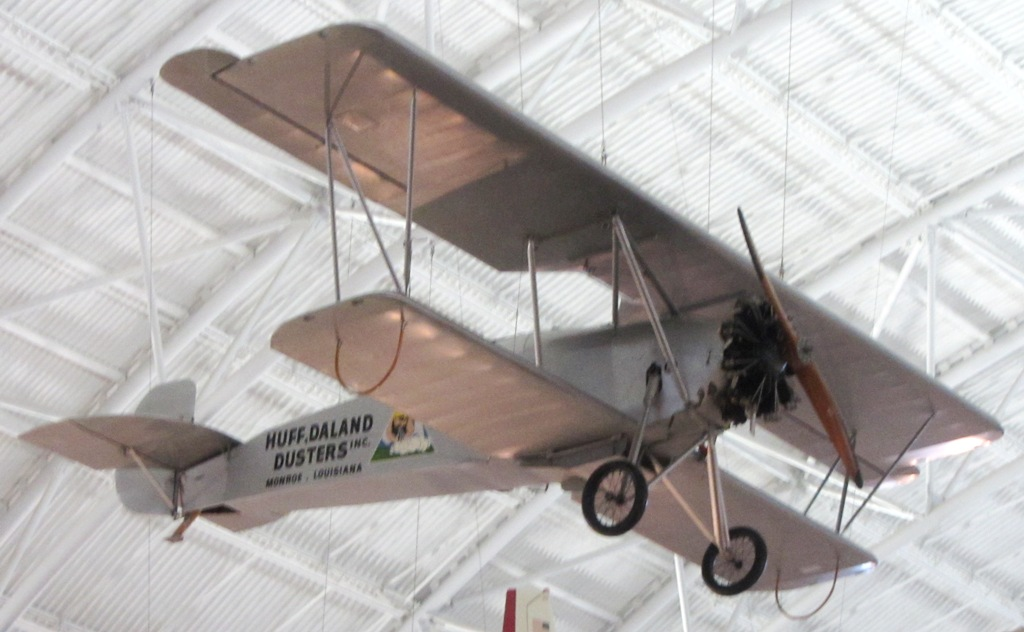
- Predecessor: Ogdensburg Aeroway Corp
- Successor: Keystone Aircraft Corp
- Key people: Thomas Henri Huff; Elliot Daland; George G. Post; Lt. Harold Harris
- Subsidiaries: Huff Daland Dusters, Inc.

Huff-Daland was an American aircraft manufacturer. Formed as Ogdensburg Aeroway Corp in 1920 in Ogdensburg, New York, by Thomas Huff and Elliot Daland, its name was quickly changed to Huff-Daland Aero Corp and then in 1925 it was changed again to Huff-Daland Aero Company with its main headquarters in Bristol, Pennsylvania. Huff-Daland produced a series of biplanes as trainers, observation planes, and light bombers for the U.S. Army and Navy.

From 1923-1924, Huff-Daland developed the first aircraft designed for crop dusting and began selling and promoting the new service through a subsidiary Huff Daland Dusters founded on March 2, 1925. C.E. Woolman, general manager, led a group of local investors to acquire the company's assets; the dusting subsidiary became a founding component of Delta Air Lines.

In 1927, the corporation was taken over by Hayden, Stone & Company, a New York City brokerage firm and in the course of the merger it became the Huff-Daland Division of the Keystone Aircraft Corporation. A single example of the Huff-Daland XB-1 bomber became the Keystone XB-1B, after its original Packard 2A-1500 engines were replaced with Curtiss V-1570-5 "Conqueror" engines. The Improved -B aircraft had better performance than the original, but still did not compare favorably to the other aircraft of the period and never entered production.

Keystone merged with the Loening Company in 1928. By 1931, Keystone had become the Keystone Aircraft Division of the Curtiss-Wright Corporation.

== Aircraft models ==
- Huff-Daland HD-1B
- Huff-Daland HD-4
- Huff-Daland HD-8A
- Huff-Daland HD-9A
- Huff-Daland TA-2 biplane observation/trainer
- Huff-Daland TA-6, TW-5, AT-1, AT-2, HN-1, HN-2, HO-1 biplane observation/trainers (1923–1925)
- Huff-Daland LB-1 light bomber
- Huff-Daland XB-1 Twin-engine experimental military bomber biplane (1927)
- Huff-Daland XHB-1 experimental heavy bomber
- XLB-3 Twin-engine experimental military bomber biplane (1930)
