= Glenn L. Martin Company Plant No. 2 =

- U.S. National Register of Historic Places
- Location within Maryland Location within the United States
- Location: 2800 Eastern Boulevard, Middle River, Maryland
- Coordinates: 39°20′11″N 76°24′59″W
- Built: 1940-1942
- Architect: Albert Kahn
- Architectural style: Art Moderne Industrial style
- NRHP reference No.: 100009218
- Added to NRHP: August 14, 2023

Glenn L. Martin Company Plant No. 2 is a historic airplane factory located at Middle River, Baltimore County, Maryland. The plant was built between 1940 and 1942, and is a large manufacturing complex designed by noted architect Albert Kahn and built by the Glenn L. Martin Company in the Art Moderne Industrial style. The complex includes 10 contributing resources related to its role in World War II as the primary production facility for the Martin B-26 Marauder bomber from late 1941 to 1945.

It was listed on the National Register of Historic Places in 2023.
