= Bomber: A Defense Report on Film =

1941 American government film

- Title frame
- Written by: Carl Sandburg
- Production company: United States Office for Emergency Management Film Unit
- Distributed by: United States Office for Emergency Management
- Release date: October 3, 1941
- Running time: 10 minutes
- Country: United States
- Language: English

Bomber: A Defense Report on Film is a 1941 American short documentary film produced by the United States Office for Emergency Management, and was edited from the 19-minute Building a Bomber: A Defense Report on Film (1941). The film commentary was written by Carl Sandburg.

The main subject of Bomber: A Defense Report on Film was the Martin B-26 Marauder, a twin-engine medium bomber in production from 1941 to 1945. (Note: After entering service with the United States Army Air Corps (USAAC), the B-26 aircraft received the reputation of a "Widowmaker" due to the early models' high accident rate during takeoffs and landings. The USAAC went to great lengths to calm fears about the dangers of flying the B-26.)

== Synopsis ==
Bomber: A Defense Report on Film showed aspects of the assembly of Martin B-26 Marauders at the Glenn L. Martin Company plant in Baltimore, Maryland. The manufacture of the aircraft involves both mechanical assembly as well as work done by hand, such as riveting. The process of building a bomber is seen, from the foundry where molten metals are cooked, to rivets and tools designed specifically for American aircraft production.

The many sub-assemblies that make up the bomber were precisely machined so that the final assembly was eased. After assembly, the B-26s were tested by a small team of two USAAC pilots and a flight engineer, before acceptance by the military. (Note: The first B-26 was accepted by the USAAC on February 6, 1941.)

== Reception ==
Bomber: A Defense Report on Film was typical of the information-based training films of the period produced under the auspices of the Office of War Information. The film was distributed and exhibited by under the auspices of the Motion Picture Committee Cooperating for National Defense; and ends with the "V sign" signifying victory.

Bomber: A Defense Report on Film was nominated for an Academy Award for Best Documentary Short.

The Academy Film Archive preserved Bomber: A Defense Report on Film in 2002.
