= Glenn L. Martin Company =

American aerospace company (1912–1961)

- Industry: Aerospace
- Founded: August 16, 1912; 114 years ago
- Founder: Glenn L. Martin
- Defunct: October 10, 1961; 65 years ago
- Fate: Merged with American-Marietta Corporation to form Martin Marietta
- Successor: Martin Marietta
- Headquarters: Middle River, Maryland, United States
- Products: Aircraft

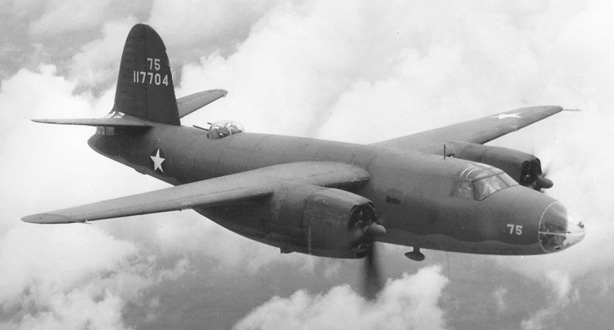
The Martin B-26 Marauder, a bomber produced by Martin during World War II

The Glenn L. Martin Company, also known as the Martin Company from 1917 to 1961, was an American aircraft and aerospace manufacturing company founded by aviation pioneer Glenn L. Martin. The Martin Company produced many important aircraft for the defense of the US and allies, especially during World War II and the Cold War. During the 1950s and 1960s, the Martin Company moved from the aircraft industry into the guided missile, space exploration, and space utilization industries.

In 1961, the Martin Company merged with American-Marietta Corporation, a large industrial conglomerate, forming the Martin Marietta corporation. In turn, Martin Marietta in 1995 merged with aerospace giant Lockheed Corporation to form the Lockheed Martin corporation.

== History ==
=== Origins ===
Glenn L. Martin Company was founded by aviation pioneer Glenn Luther Martin on August 16, 1912. He started the company building military training aircraft in Santa Ana, California, and in September 1916, Martin accepted a merger offer from the Wright Company, creating the Wright-Martin Aircraft Company. This merger did not function well, so Glenn Martin left to form a second Glenn L. Martin Company on September 10, 1917. This new company was headquartered in Cleveland, Ohio.

=== Mexican Revolution ===
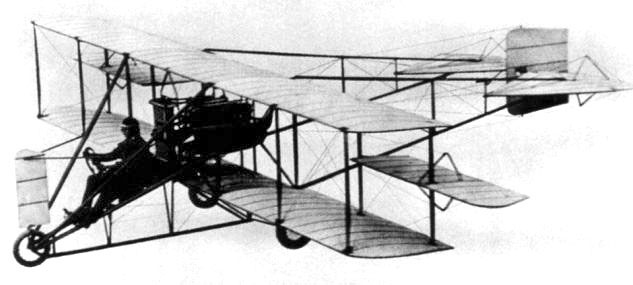
The Sonora, a Martin Pusher single-seater, saw combat in the Mexican Revolution (1913)

In 1913, Mexican insurgents from the northwestern state of Sonora bought a single-seater Martin Pusher biplane in Los Angeles with the intention of attacking federal naval forces that were attacking the port of Guaymas. The aircraft was shipped on May 5, 1913, in five crates to Tucson, Arizona, via Wells Fargo Express, and then moved through the border into Mexico to the town of Naco, Sonora. The aircraft, named Sonora by the insurgents, was reassembled there and fitted with a second seat for a bomber position.

The Sonora, armed with rudimentary 3-inch (76 mm) pipe bombs, carried out some of the earliest aerial attacks against naval vessels.

=== World War I ===
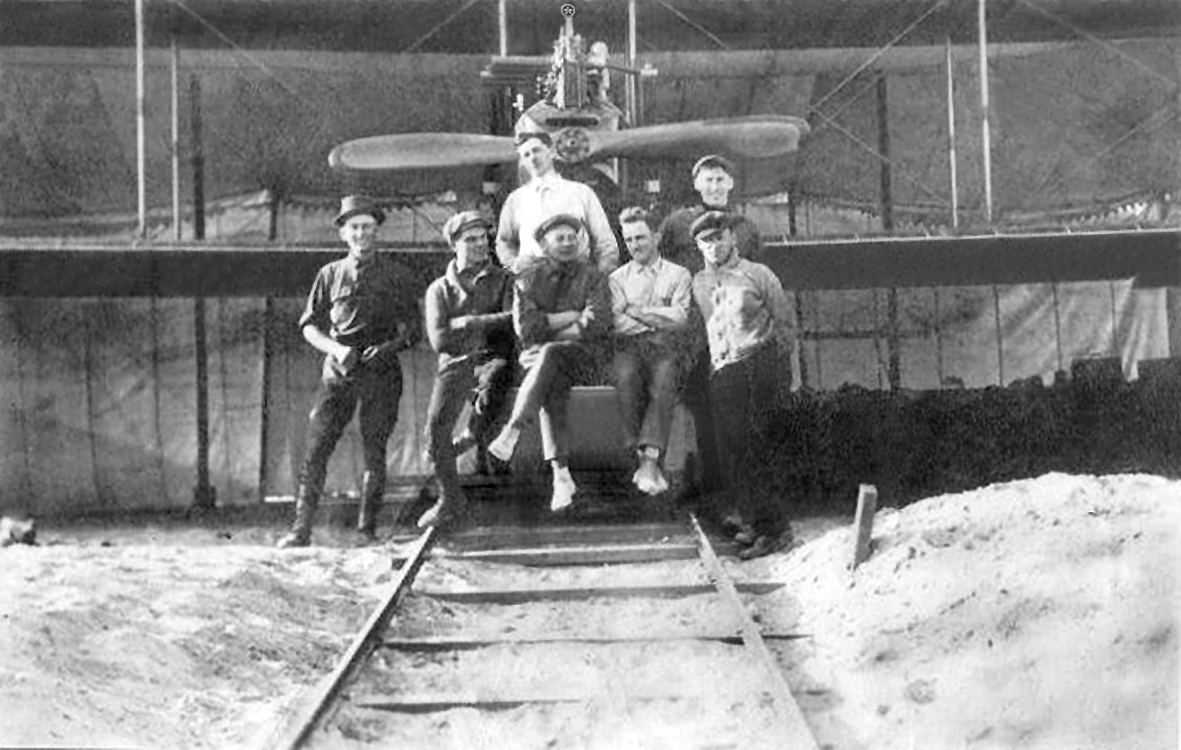
A Glenn Martin TT with Sergeant Broeckhuysen of the Royal Netherlands East Indies Army Air Force seated in the middle with factory mechanics (1917)

For the Netherlands East Indies, several planes were delivered, with the first flight on November 6, 1915. It involved two Type TEs, six Type TTs, and eight Type Rs. Martin's first big success came during World War I with the MB-1 bomber, a large biplane design ordered by the United States Army on January 17, 1918. The MB-1 entered service after the end of hostilities. A follow-up design, the MB-2, proved successful; 20 were ordered by the Army Air Service, the first five of them under the company designation and the last 15 as the NBS-1 (Night Bomber, Short range). Although the War Department ordered 110 more, it retained the ownership rights of the design, and put the order out for bid. The production orders were given to other companies that had bid lower, Curtiss (50), L.W.F. Engineering (35), and Aeromarine (25). The design was the only standard bomber used by the Air Service until 1930, and was used by seven squadrons of the Air Service/Air Corps: Four in Virginia, two in Hawaii, and one in the Philippines.

=== Inter-war years ===
In 1924, the Martin Company underbid Curtiss for the production of a Curtiss-designed scout bomber, the SC-1, and ultimately Martin produced 404 of these. In 1929, Martin sold the Cleveland plant and built a new one in Middle River, Maryland, northeast of Baltimore.

During the 1930s, Martin built flying boats for the U.S. Navy, and the innovative Martin B-10 bomber for the Army. The Martin Company also produced the noted China Clipper flying boats used by Pan American Airways for its transpacific San Francisco to the Philippines route. Glenn Martin's younger cousin Jonathan “Jack” Martin left the company, staying in the Ohio area to form a company that would eventually become the Martin Collier Phillips Corporation.

=== World War II ===
During World War II, a few of Martin's most successful designs were the B-26 Marauder and A-22 Maryland bombers, the PBM Mariner and JRM Mars flying boats, widely used for air-sea rescue, anti-submarine warfare and transport. The 1941 Office for Emergency Management film Bomber was filmed in the Martin facility in Baltimore, and showed aspects of the production of the B-26.

Martin ranked 14th among U.S. corporations in the value of wartime production contracts. The company built 1,585 B-26 Marauders and 531 Boeing B-29 Superfortresses at its new bomber plant in Nebraska, just south of Omaha at Offutt Field. Among the B-29s manufactured there were all the Silverplate aircraft, including Enola Gay and Bockscar, which dropped the two war-ending atomic bombs on Hiroshima and Nagasaki, Japan.

=== Postwar ===
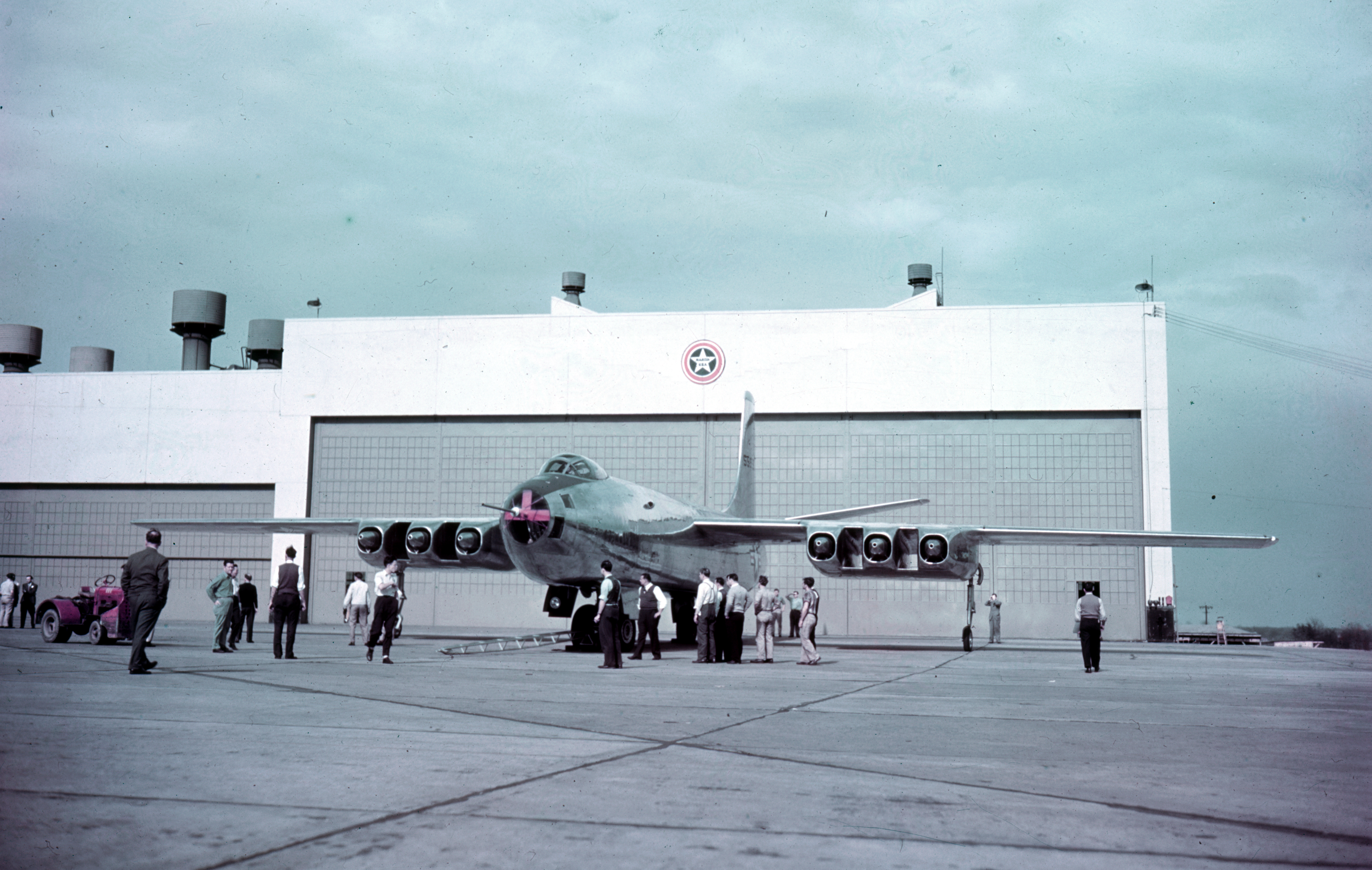
XB-48 bomber prototype, in front of Martin Company hangar, c. 1947

On April 22, 1957, the company name was changed to the Martin Company.

Postwar efforts in aeronautics by the Martin Company included two unsuccessful prototype bombers, the XB-48 and the XB-51, the marginally successful AM Mauler, the successful B-57 Canberra tactical bombers, the P5M Marlin and P6M SeaMaster seaplanes, and the Martin 2-0-2 and Martin 4-0-4 twin-engined passenger airliners.

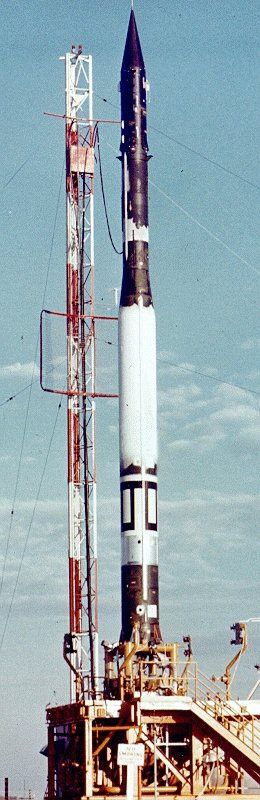
The Vanguard rocket, designed and built by Martin for Project Vanguard, prepares to launch Vanguard 1.

The Martin Company moved into the aerospace manufacturing business. It produced the Vanguard rocket, used by the American space program as one of its first satellite booster rockets as part of Project Vanguard. The Vanguard was the first American space exploration rocket designed from scratch to be an orbital launch vehicle — rather than being a modified ballistic missile (such as the U.S. Army's Juno I). Martin also designed and manufactured the huge and heavily armed Titan I and LGM-25C Titan II intercontinental ballistic missiles (ICBMs). Martin Company of Orlando, Florida, was the prime contractor for the US Army's Pershing missile.

The Martin Company was one of two finalists for the command and service modules of the Apollo Program. The National Aeronautics and Space Administration (NASA) awarded the design and production contracts for these to the North American Aviation Corporation.

The Martin Company went further in the production of larger booster rockets for NASA and the U.S. Air Force with its Titan III series of over 100 rockets produced, including the Titan IIIA, the more-important Titan IIIC, and the Titan IIIE. Besides hundreds of Earth satellites, these rockets were essential for the sending to outer space of the two space probes of the Voyager Project to the outer planets, the two space probes of the Viking Project to Mars, and the two Helios probes into low orbits around the Sun (closer, even, than Mercury).

Finally, the US Air Force required a booster rocket that could launch heavier satellites than either the Titan IIIE or the Space Shuttle. The Martin Company responded with its extremely large Titan IV series of rockets. When the Titan IV came into service, it could carry a heavier payload to orbit than any other rocket in production. Besides its use by the Air Force to launch its sequence of very heavy reconnaissance satellites, one Titan IV, with a powerful Centaur rocket upper stage, was used to launch the heavy Cassini space probe to the planet Saturn in 1997. The Cassini probe orbited Saturn from 2004 to 2017, successfully returning mountains of scientific data.

The halting of production of the Titan IV in 2004 brought to an end production of the last rocket able to carry a heavier payload than the Space Shuttle, which itself ended in 2011.

The Martin Company merged with the American-Marietta Corporation, a chemical-products and construction-materials manufacturer, in 1961, to form the Martin Marietta Corporation. In 1995, Martin Marietta, then the nation's third-largest defense contractor, merged with the Lockheed Corporation, then the nation's second-largest defense contractor, to form the Lockheed Martin Corporation, becoming the largest such company in the world.

The Martin Company employed many of the founders and chief engineers of the American aerospace industry, including:

- Dandridge M. Cole – moved on as aerospace engineer at General Electric
- Donald Douglas – founder of Douglas Aircraft, later as McDonnell Douglas (now part of Boeing)
- Lawrence Dale Bell – founded Bell Aircraft, now Bell Helicopter
- James S. McDonnell – founded McDonnell Aircraft, later as McDonnell Douglas (now part of Boeing)
- J.H. "Dutch" Kindleberger – CEO and chairman of North American Aviation
- Hans Multhopp – concepts used to create NASA's Space Shuttle
- C. A. Van Dusen – Brewster Aeronautical Corporation

Martin also taught William Boeing how to fly and sold him his first airplane.

The Glenn L. Martin Company Plant No. 2 was listed on the National Register of Historic Places in 2023.

== Products ==
=== Aircraft ===
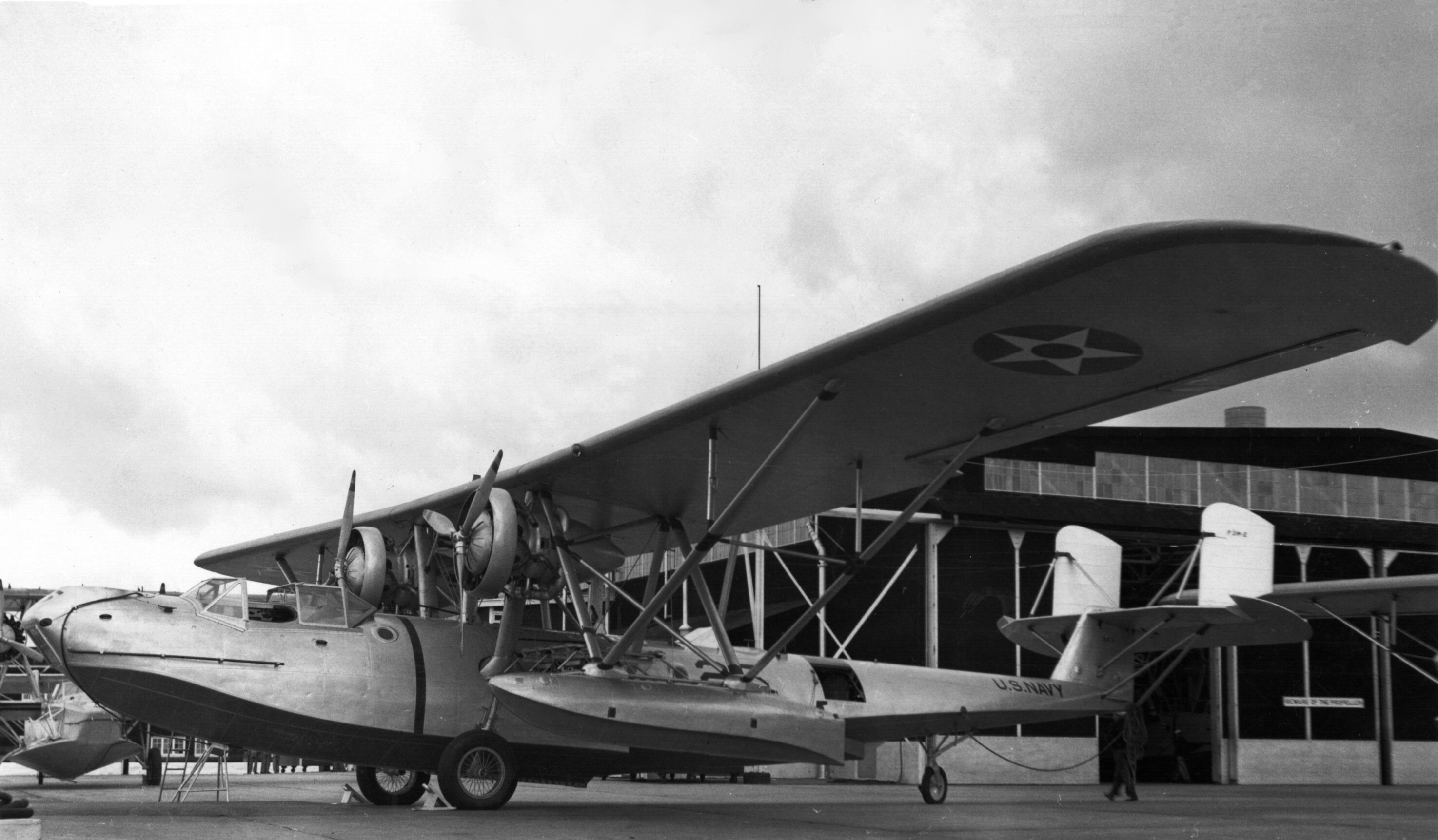
Martin P3M-2

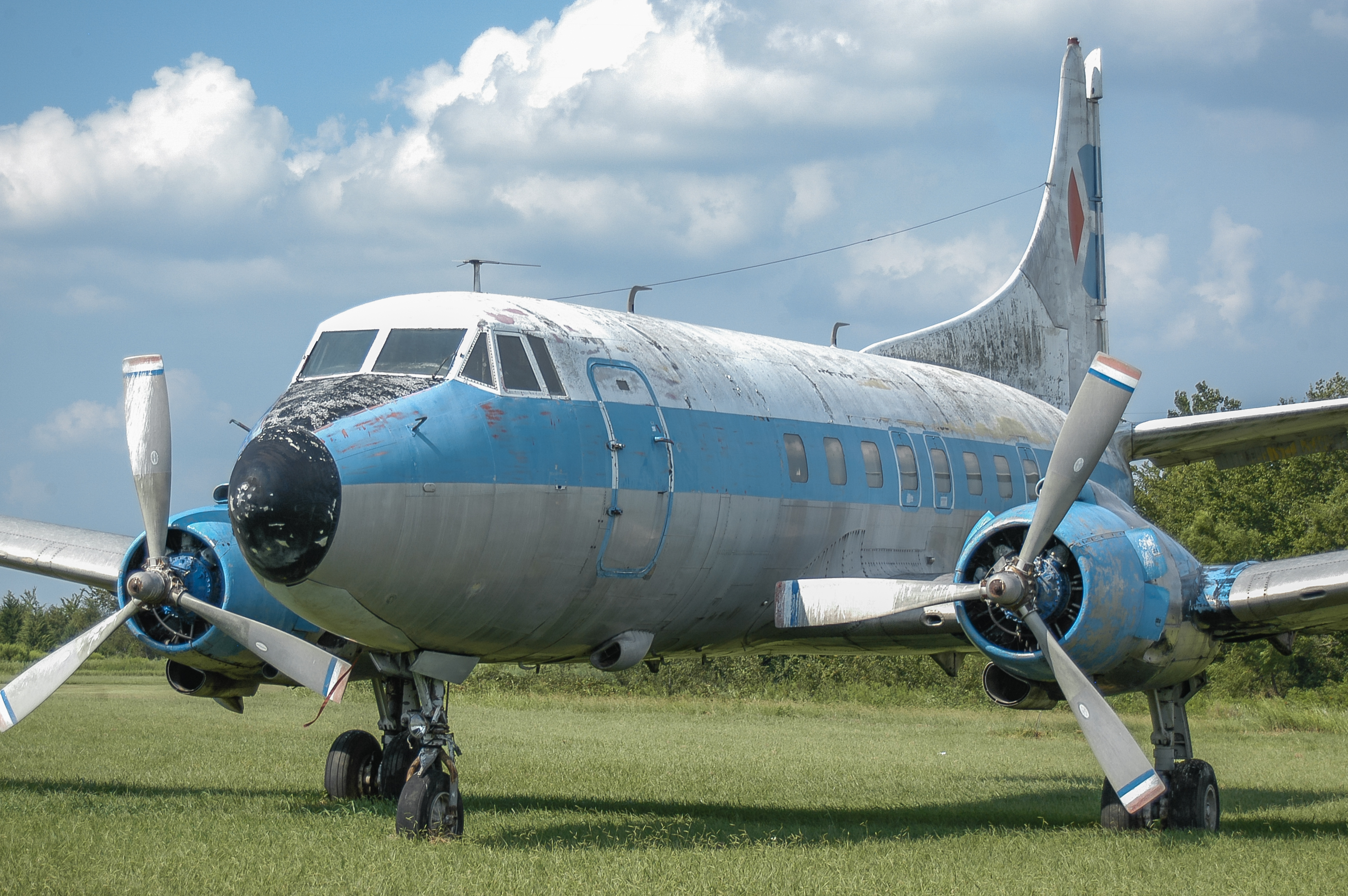
An abandoned Pro Air Martin 4-0-4 N255S in Paris, Texas

Model name	First flight	Number built	Type
Martin MB-1	1918	20	Twin piston-engined biplane bomber
Martin NBS-1	1920	130	Twin piston-engined biplane bomber
Martin MS	1923	6	Single piston-engined biplane scout
Martin N2M	1924	1	Prototype single piston-engined biplane trainer
Martin MO	1922	36	Single piston-engined monoplane observation airplane
Martin T3M	1926	124	Single piston-engined biplane torpedo bomber
Martin T4M	1927	103	Single piston-engined biplane torpedo bomber
Martin BM	1929	33	Single piston-engined biplane torpedo bomber
Martin XT6M	1930	1	Prototype single piston-engined biplane torpedo bomber
Martin PM	1930	55	Twin piston-engined biplane flying boat patrol airplane
Martin XP2M	1931	1	Prototype triple piston-engined monoplane flying boat patrol bomber
Martin P3M	1931	9	Twin piston-engined monoplane flying boat patrol bomber
Martin B-10	1932	348	Twin piston-engined monoplane bomber
Martin M-130	1934	3	Quadruple (quad) piston-engined monoplane flying boat airliner
Martin 146	1935	1	Prototype twin piston-engined monoplane bomber
Martin M-156	1937	1	Quad piston-engined monoplane flying boat airliner
Martin PBM Mariner	1939	1,366	Twin piston-engined monoplane flying boat patrol bomber
Martin 167 Maryland	1939	450	Twin piston-engined monoplane bomber
Martin B-26 Marauder	1940	5,288	Twin piston-engined monoplane bomber
Martin 187 Baltimore	1941	1,575	Twin piston-engined monoplane bomber
Martin JRM Mars	1942	7	Quad piston-engined monoplane flying boat transport
Martin AM Mauler	1944	151	Single piston-engined monoplane attack airplane
Martin P4M Mercator	1946	21	Twin piston-engined monoplane patrol bomber
Martin 2-0-2	1946	47	Twin piston-engined monoplane airliner
Martin XB-48	1947	2	Prototype six-jet-engined monoplane bomber
Martin 3-0-3	1947	1	Prototype twin piston-engined monoplane airliner
Martin P5M Marlin	1948	285	Twin piston-engined monoplane flying boat patrol bomber
Martin XB-51	1949	2	Prototype triple jet-engined monoplane bomber
Martin 4-0-4	1950	103	Twin piston-engined monoplane airliner
Martin B-57 Canberra	1953	403	Twin jet-engined monoplane bomber
Martin P6M SeaMaster	1955	12	Quad jet-engined monoplane flying boat patrol bomber
Martin M2O-1		3	Single piston-engined biplane float observation airplane
Martin XO-4	N/A	0	Single piston-engined biplane observation airplane
Martin 70		~2	Single piston-engined biplane mail plane
Martin XNBL-2	N/A	0	Unbuilt twin piston-engined biplane bomber
Martin XLB-4	N/A	0	Unbuilt twin piston-engined biplane bomber
Martin XB-16	N/A	0	Unbuilt quad piston-engined monoplane bomber
Martin XB-27	N/A	0	Unbuilt twin piston-engined monoplane bomber
Martin XB-33 Super Marauder	N/A	0	Unbuilt twin piston-engined monoplane bomber
Martin XB-68	N/A	0	Unbuilt twin jet-engined monoplane bomber
Martin 193	N/A	0	Unbuilt six-piston-engined monoplane flying boat transport
Martin P7M SubMaster	N/A	0	Combined quad piston/twin jet-engined flying boat antisubmarine airplane

=== Aircraft engines ===
- Martin 333, a four-cylinder inverted in-line piston engine

=== Missiles and rockets ===
The Glenn L. Martin Company developed the following guided missiles, ballistic missiles, sounding rockets, and launch vehicles before its 1961 merger with American-Marietta Corporation.

- AAM-N-4 Oriole
- ASM-N-5 Gorgon V
- MGM-1 Matador
- MGM-13 Mace
- MGM-18 Lacrosse
- Pershing I
- Bold Orion
- SM-68/HGM-25A Titan I
- LGM-25C Titan II
- Viking (rocket)
- Vanguard

=== Automobile ===
- 1928 Martin 100 Aerodynamic

== See also ==
- Glenn L. Martin Maryland Aviation Museum
- Martin State Airport
- Lester P. Barlow
