= Huff-Daland XB-1 =

American bomber prototype

XB-1
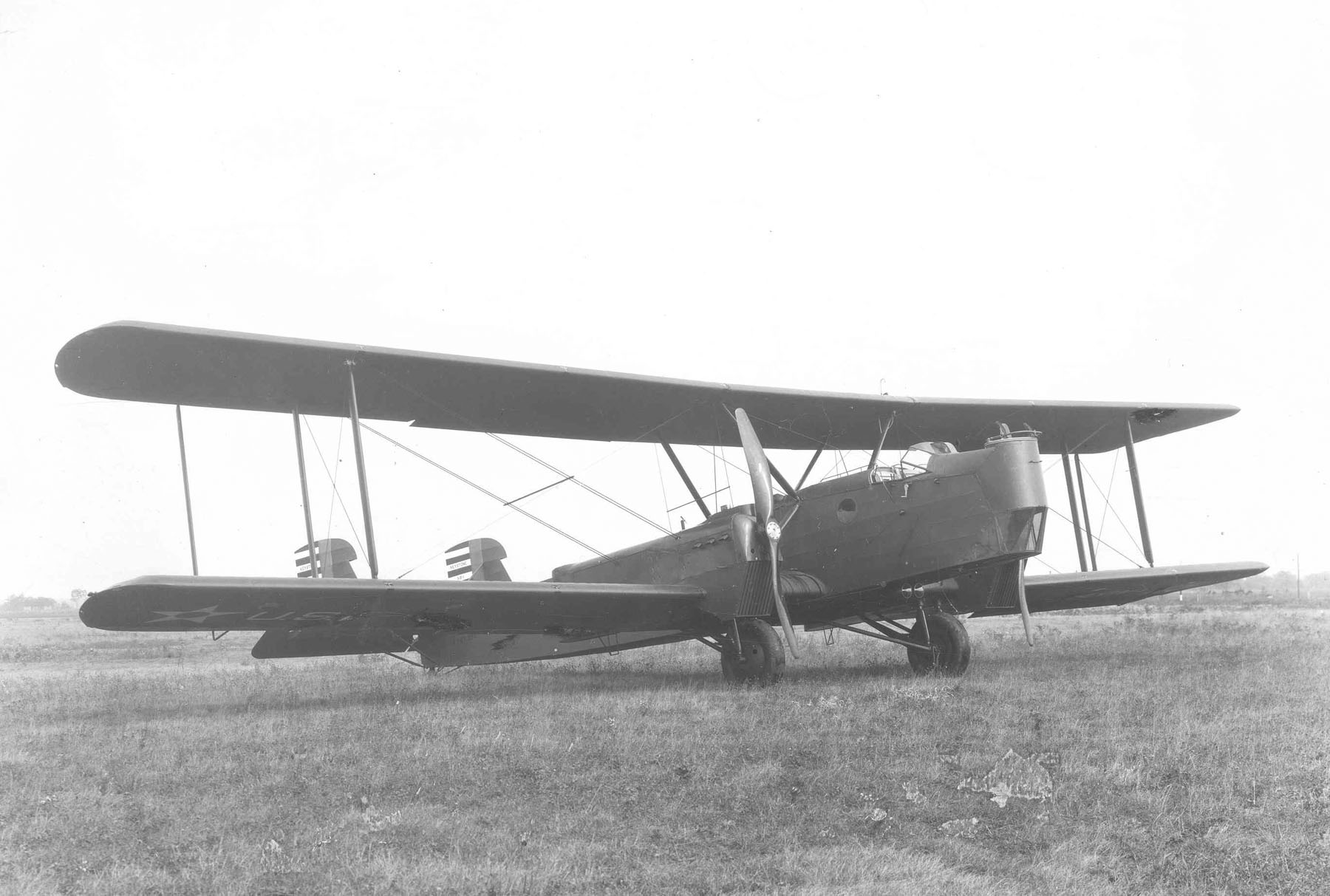

General information
- Type: Medium bomber
- Manufacturer: Huff-Daland Aero Company
- Status: Scrapped
- Number built: 1

History
- First flight: September 1927
- Developed from: Huff-Daland XHB-1

The Huff-Daland XB-1 was a prototype bomber aircraft built for the United States Army Air Corps.

The XB-1 was the first aircraft named using just a B- designation. Prior to 1926, the U.S. Army used LB- and HB- prefixes, signifying 'Light Bomber' and 'Heavy Bomber'. The first XB-1, called the Super-Cyclops by Huff-Daland, was an extension of the earlier Huff-Daland XHB-1 'Cyclops'. It was essentially the same in size, but sported a twin tail and twin engines.

== Design and development ==
The XB-1's gunnery arrangement was new for an American bomber, but had been previously used by the British and the Germans during World War I. The Army Air Corps had decided that single-engined bombers such as the XHB-1 performed worse, and weren't as safe as twin-engined bombers.

== Operational history ==
The aircraft flew for the first time in September 1927. Its original Packard engines did not provide enough power for the aircraft, and it was refitted with more powerful Curtiss Aircraft "Conqueror" engines. This new configuration was designated the XB-1B.

Three other similar aircraft designs were requested by the Army Air Corps around the same time which competed against the XB-1 for the contract. Of these three (the XB-2 Condor, the Sikorsky S-37 and the Fokker XLB-2), the Curtiss model eventually won, and only a single XB-1 was ever produced.

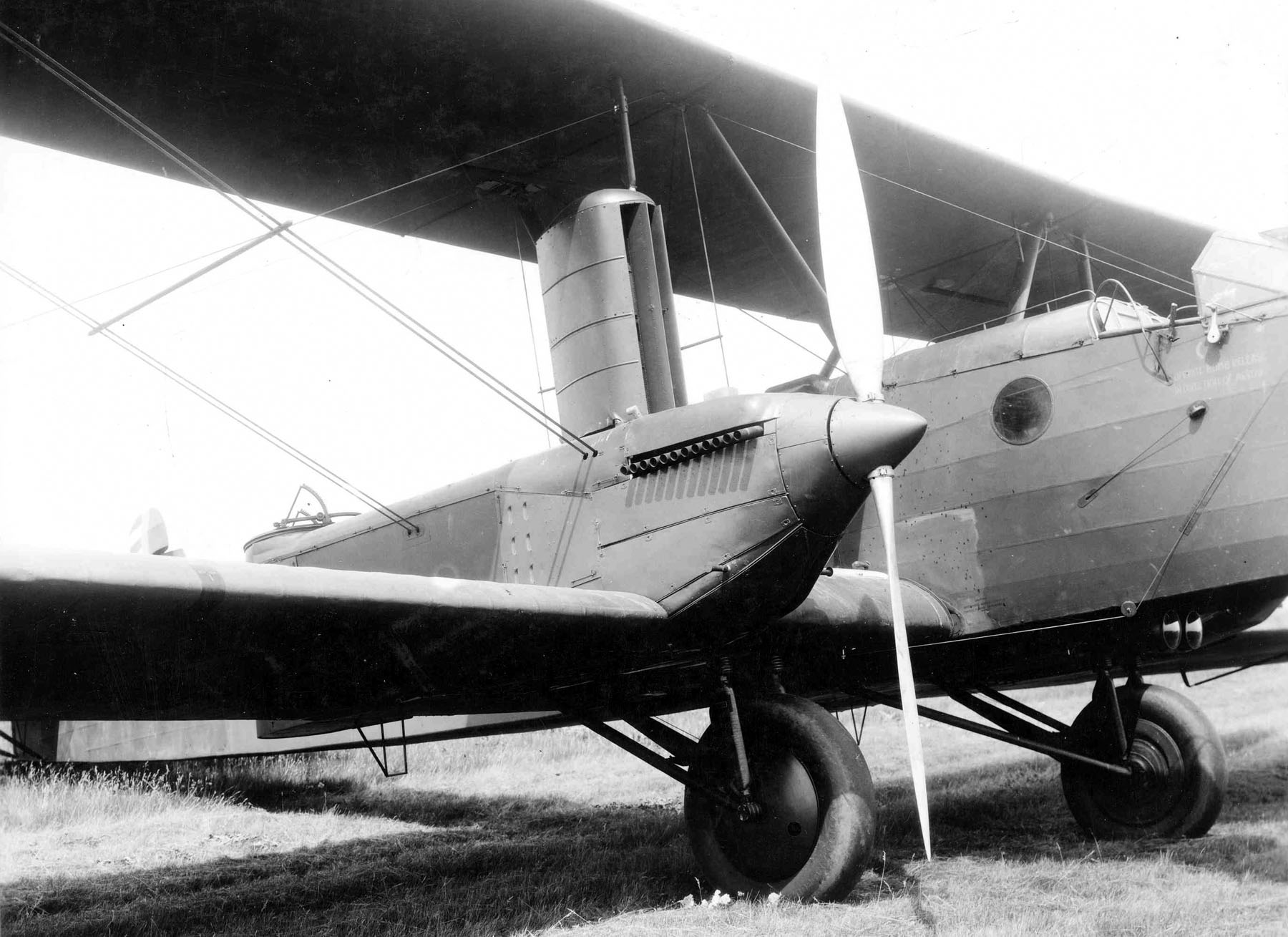
Close view of starboard nacelle

== Specifications (XB-1B) ==
General characteristics

- Crew: 5
- Length: 61 ft 6 in (18.7 m)
- Wingspan: 85 ft 0 in (25.9 m)
- Height: 19 ft 3 in (5.9 m)
- Wing area: 1,604 sq ft (149.0 m^{2})
- Empty weight: 9,462 lb (4,292 kg)
- Gross weight: 16,500 lb (7,480 kg)
- Powerplant: 2 × Curtiss V-1570-5 Conqueror liquid-cooled V12 engines, 600 hp (450 kW) each

Performance

- Maximum speed: 100 mph (160 km/h, 86 kn)
- Range: 700 mi (1,100 km, 610 nmi)
- Service ceiling: 15,000 ft (4,600 m)
- Wing loading: 5.899 lb/sq ft (28.80 kg/m^{2})
- Power/mass: 0.072 hp/lb (120 W/kg)

Armament

- Guns: 6 × .30 in (7.62 mm) Lewis machine guns
- Bombs: 2,500 lb (1,100 kg); 4,000 lb (1,800 kg) on short runs

== See also ==
Related development

- Huff-Daland XHB-1

Aircraft of comparable role, configuration, and era

- Curtiss B-2 Condor
- Fokker XLB-2
- Huff-Daland XHB-1
- Sikorsky S-37

Related lists

- List of bomber aircraft
- List of military aircraft of the United States
