= Huff-Daland XHB-1 =

Military plane

XHB-1 "Cyclops"
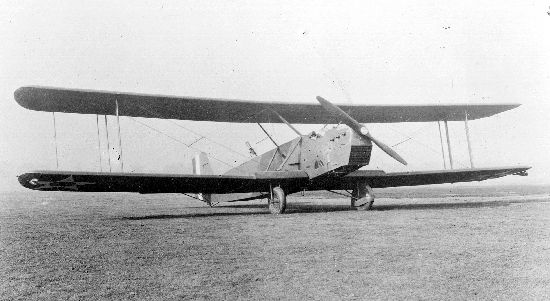

General information
- Type: Heavy single-engined bomber
- National origin: United States
- Manufacturer: Huff-Daland
- Primary user: United States Army Air Corps
- Number built: 1

History
- Variant: Huff-Daland XB-1

The Huff-Daland XHB-1 "Cyclops" was a 1920s American prototype heavy bomber designed and built by the Huff-Daland company.

== Design and development ==
The XHB-1 was designed as an enlarged version of the earlier LB-1 powered by a single 750 hp Packard 2A-2540 nose-mounted engine. It had a crew of four and had a 4000 lb bomb load. The Army decided not to order the Cyclops into production as it had decided single-engined aircraft were not suitable for the role.

A twin-engined version was developed as the XB-1 Super Cyclops.

== Operators ==
United States
United States Army Air Corps

== Specifications (XHB-1) ==
Data from

General characteristics

- Crew: 4 (pilot, co-pilot, rear gunner, navigator/ventral gunner)
- Length: 59 ft 7 in (18.17 m)
- Wingspan: 84 ft 7 in (25.79 m)
- Height: 17 ft 2 in (5.23 m)
- Gross weight: 16,834 lb (7,636 kg)
- Powerplant: 1 × Packard 2A-2540 , 750 hp (560 kW)

Performance

- Maximum speed: 109 mph (175 km/h, 95 kn)

== See also ==
Related lists

- List of bomber aircraft
- List of military aircraft of the United States
