= List of United States Navy aircraft designations (pre-1962) =

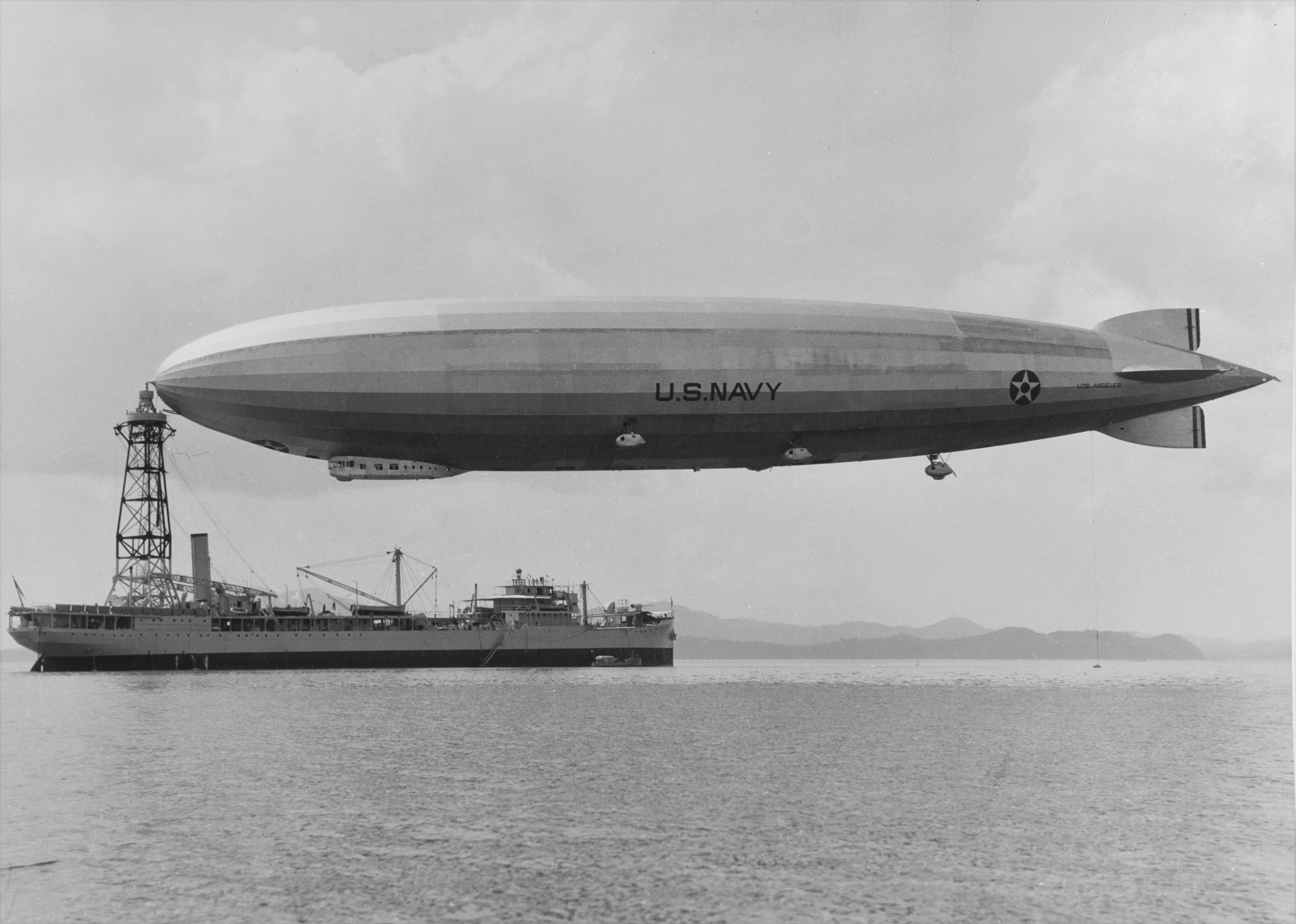
US Navy rigid airship Los Angeles tied up to the mooring mast aboard airship tender Patoka, circa 1931

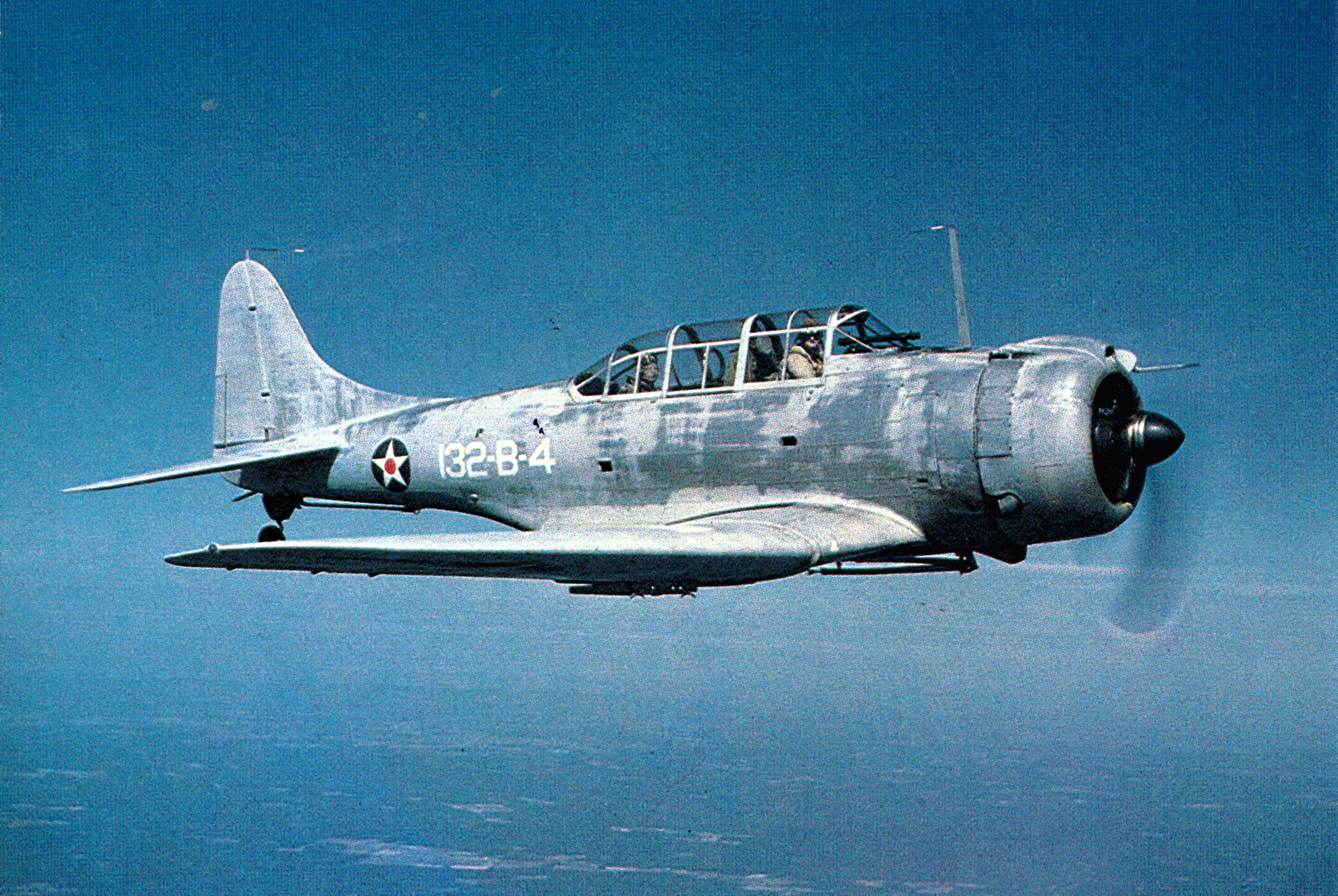
A US Marine Corps SBD-1 Dauntless of Marine Scout Bombing Squadron 132 (VMSB-132) in flight over the Pacific Ocean, circa 1941

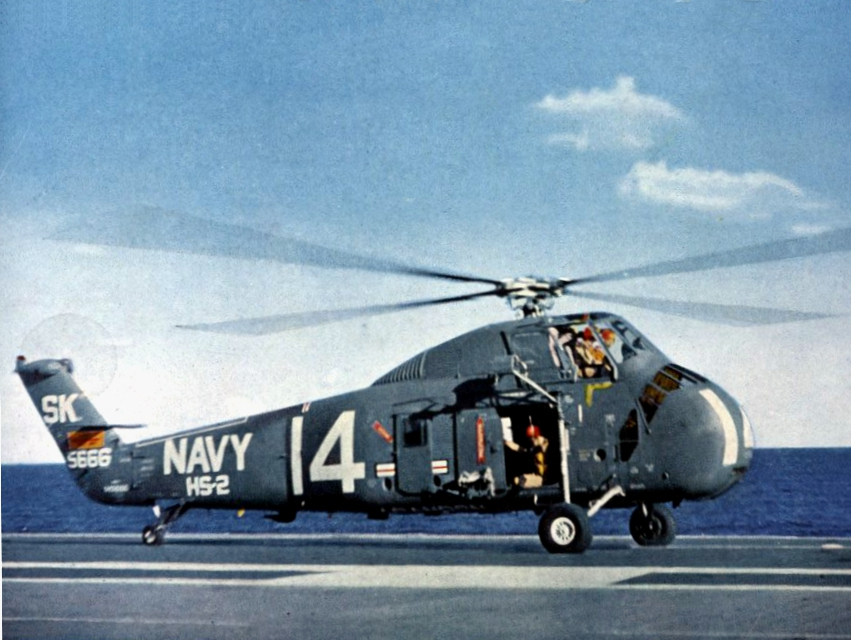
A US Navy HSS-1 Seabat of Helicopter Anti-Submarine Squadron Two (HS-2) aboard aircraft carrier Yorktown, circa 1959

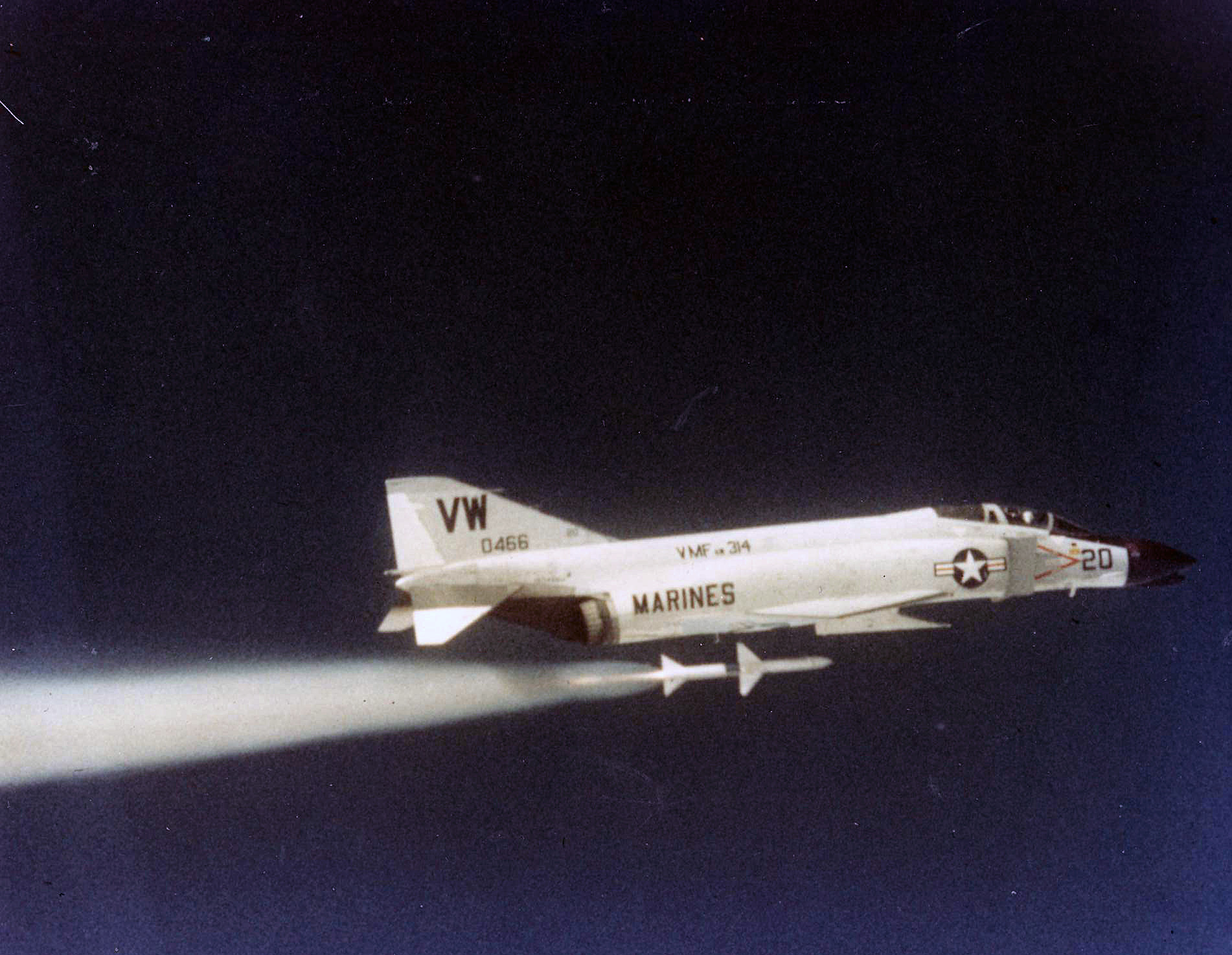
A US Marine Corps F4H-1 Phantom II jet of Marine All-Weather Fighter Squadron 314 (VMF(AW)-314) firing an AIM-7 Sparrow missile, circa 1961

This list of United States Navy aircraft designations (pre-1962) includes prototype, pre-production and operational type designations under the 1922 United States Navy aircraft designation system, which was used by the United States Navy, the United States Marine Corps, and the United States Coast Guard. The list also includes airships, which were designated under different systems than fixed-wing aircraft and rotorcraft until 1954, and naval aircraft that received designations under the 1911 and 1914 U.S. Navy systems, which were sequential by manufacturer or aircraft class, and did not convey information about the aircraft's mission.

For aircraft designations under the U.S. Army Air Force/U.S. Air Force system or the post-1962 Tri-Service system—which includes U.S. Navy, Marine Corps and Coast Guard aircraft currently in service—see List of military aircraft of the United States. For Navy, Marine Corps and Coast Guard aircraft that did not receive formal designations—including those procured from 1917 to 1922 when no designation system was in force, and later aircraft that did not receive designations for other reasons—see List of undesignated military aircraft of the United States.

== Summary of pre-1962 designation systems ==
=== 1911 system ===
The first U.S. Navy designation system, adopted in 1911, consisted of a letter signifying the manufacturer followed by sequential numbers for individual aircraft from each manufacturer. Only heavier-than-air craft (i.e. airplanes) were given designations. The system was subsequently amended to differentiate aircraft classes from the same manufacturer. The designation letters were as follows:

- A – Curtiss Aeroplane Company, landplanes and hydro aeroplanes (i.e. floatplanes)
- B – Wright Company, landplanes and hydro aeroplanes
- C – Curtiss Aeroplane, flying boats
- D – Burgess and Curtis, (Note: The Curtis name in Burgess and Curtis referred to a business partner unrelated to Curtiss Aeroplane founder Glenn Curtiss; there was no relationship between the companies at the time. Burgess was subsequently absorbed by Curtiss Aeroplane after the 1911 designation system had been superseded.) landplanes and hydro aeroplanes
- E – Curtiss Aeroplane, amphibians

=== 1914 system ===
In March 1914, the navy introduced a system similar to hull classification symbols for warships, with an alphabetical code for the aircraft class followed by a sequential number assigned to an individual aircraft. All aircraft designated under the 1911 system that were still in inventory were redesignated. Also consistent with warship designation practices, the designation of the first aircraft of a particular design became the type designation for similar aircraft; for instance, aircraft similar to AH-8 were referred to as AH-8 type.

The aircraft classes and sub-types were as follows:

- A – Heavier than air

- AH – Aeroplane, Hydro
- AB – Flying boat
- AX – Amphibian

- B – Free balloon
- C – Dirigible
- D – Kite balloon

This second system was abandoned in May 1917 without immediate replacement; until March 1922, the navy used manufacturers' model designations. However, some later aircraft similar to types with 1914 system designations were given conforming designations, apparently on an informal basis.

=== 1922 system ===
On 29 March 1922, a new designation system was introduced with a reorganization of U.S. naval aviation under the Bureau of Aeronautics. The system conveyed its information in the form:

(Mission)(Design Number)(Manufacturer)-(Subtype)(Minor Modification)

For example, F4U-1A referred to a minor modification (A) to the first major subtype (1) of Chance-Vought's (U) fourth (4) fighter (F) design.

For the first few years after the system was introduced, the manufacturer's letter and the mission letter were sometimes reversed. If it was the manufacturer's first design for that particular mission, there was no number before the manufacturer letter.

Prototypes under the 1922 system were normally prefixed with "X" (differing from purely experimental X-planes, which were not generally expected to go into production), while pre-production or trials aircraft were usually prefixed "Y", and airships were prefixed "Z" (differing from Army or Air Force use of "Z" to designate obsolete aircraft for storage or disposal).

=== Airships and balloons ===
Prior to 1954, lighter-than-air craft used separate designation systems from those used for fixed-wing aircraft and rotorcraft, or were undesignated. As a general rule, a "Z" prefix identified lighter-than-air craft.

==== Rigid airships ====
Rigid airships were designated as ZR-class—"R" for rigid—with a suffixed number identifying the individual aircraft, and unlike all other lighter-than-air craft were commissioned no differently that surface ships; therefore, the ZR code was included as a hull classification symbol with those of surface ships. With the introduction of the Akron-class airship, an "S" mission suffix was added to signify scout (ZRS-class).

==== Other airships ====
The first U.S. Navy non-rigid airship was ordered in 1915 before an airship designation system was standardized and was designated DN-1 (Note: Consulted references to not clarify why DN-1 did not receive a designation under the previously-adopted 1914 designation system even though an allowance was made for dirigibles.) for Dirigible, Non-rigid. When subsequent airships were ordered into series production for World War I (WWI), alphabetical class letters were adopted starting with the B-class blimp, with individual aircraft identified by a suffixed number; DN-1 was retroactively considered A-class by implication. Within each class, individual airships often had significant design variations, and were sometimes sourced from different manufacturers; the class designations referred to nominal power and size.

The first mission designation system for non-rigid airships, introduced in 1940, took the following form:

(Construction)(Mission)-(Class)

For example, the ZNP-K referred to K-class (K) patrol (P) non-rigid airship (ZN).

In 1947, this system was replaced by one more similar to the 1922 fixed-wing system, and the "N" for non-rigid was dropped due to the termination of the rigid airship program. The 1947 system took the following form:

(Z for airship)(Mission)(Design Number)(Class)-(Subtype)(Minor Modification)

For example, the ZP2N-1W referred to the airborne early warning modification (W) of the first subtype (1) of the N-class' (N) second (2) patrol (P) airship (Z).

The airship mission designations were initially "G" for scout, "N" for trainer, and "P" for patrol. In 1947, "N" was changed to "T" for trainers, while "H" for search and rescue and "U" for utility were added, although the latter two mission letters were ultimately not used.

In 1954, the Navy did away with the separate airship designation system and unified it with the main 1922 system, while retaining the "Z" prefix.

Spherical crewed free gas balloons used for airship crew training were considered ZF-class aircraft but never received formal designations and were identified only by serial number and volume; similarly, crewed kite balloons and uncrewed barrage balloons were considered ZK-class, but were undesignated.

=== Other exceptions ===
The non-standard XDH designation was applied to two de Havilland aircraft procured in 1927 and 1934 for use by the U.S. Naval Attaché in London.

In 1952, the Navy and Air Force agreed to standardize some flight training curricula and equipment. Accordingly, the T-28 Trojan and T-34 Mentor trainers were adopted and operated by the Navy under their Air Force designations.

== 1911 system designations, 1911–1914 ==
Data from Baugher, Joe (2006)

- A: Curtiss
  - A-1 to A-4
- B: Wright
  - B-1 to B-3
- C: Curtiss
  - C-1 to C-5
- D: Burgess and Curtis
  - D-1
  - D-2
- E: Curtiss
  - E-1 - redesignated from A-2 after conversion to amphibian

== 1914 system designations, 1914–1917 ==
Data from Baugher, Joe (2014) and Swanborough and Bowers (1976), as noted

=== A: Heavier-than-air ===
==== AB: Flying boat ====
- AB-1 to AB-5 - Curtiss; redesignated from C-1 through C-5
- AB-6 - Burgess; redesignated from D-1
- AB-7 - Burgess; redesignated from D-2

==== AH: Aeroplane, Hydro ====
- AH-1 to AH-3 - Curtiss; redesignated from A-1, A-3 and A-4
- AH-4 to AH-6 - Wright; redesignated from B-1 through B-3
- AH-7 - Burgess
- AH-8 and AH-9 - Curtiss
- AH-10 - Burgess
- AH-11 and AH-18 - Curtiss
- AH-19 - Wright
- AH-19 and AH-22 - Martin; conflicting designation, assigned after original AH-19 was rejected

==== AX: Amphibian ====
- AX-1 - Curtiss; redesignated from E-1

=== B: Free balloon ===
==== BC: Kite balloon ====
- BC-2 to BC-4 - Goodyear

== 1922 system designations, 1922–1962 ==
=== Airborne early warning ===
==== W: Airborne early warning (1952–1962) ====
- F: Grumman
  - WF Tracer – redesignated E-1 in 1962
  - W2F Hawkeye – redesignated E-2 in 1962
- U: Vought
  - WU
- V: Lockheed
  - WV Warning Star – redesignated EC-121 in 1962

=== Airship ===
==== ZP: Patrol (1954–1962) ====
- G: Goodyear
  - ZPG – redesignated from ZPN and ZP2N in 1954, redesignated Z-1 in 1962

==== ZS: Scout (1954–1962) ====
- G: Goodyear
  - ZSG – redesignated from ZP2K, ZP3K, and ZP4K
  - ZS2G – redesignated from ZP5K

==== ZW: Airborne Early Warning (1954–1962) ====
- G: Goodyear
  - ZWG

=== Ambulance ===
==== A: Ambulance (1943–1962) ====
- E: Piper
  - AE Grasshopper – redesignated from HE

==== H: Hospital (1929–1942) ====
- E: Piper
  - HE Grasshopper – redesignated AE in 1943
- L: Loening
  - HL

==== H: Air-Sea Rescue (1946–1962) ====
No designations were assigned in this sequence.

=== Anti-submarine ===
==== S: Anti-submarine (1946–1962) ====
In 1946, the "S for Scout" designation was replaced by "S for anti-Submarine", however, the numbers in the 'S' series were not restarted.

- F: Grumman
  - SF – skipped to avoid confusion with the SF in the Scout sequence
  - S2F Tracker – redesignated S-2 in 1962
- U: Vought
  - SU – skipped to avoid confusion with the SU in the Scout sequence
  - S2U

=== Attack ===
==== A: Attack (1946–1962) ====
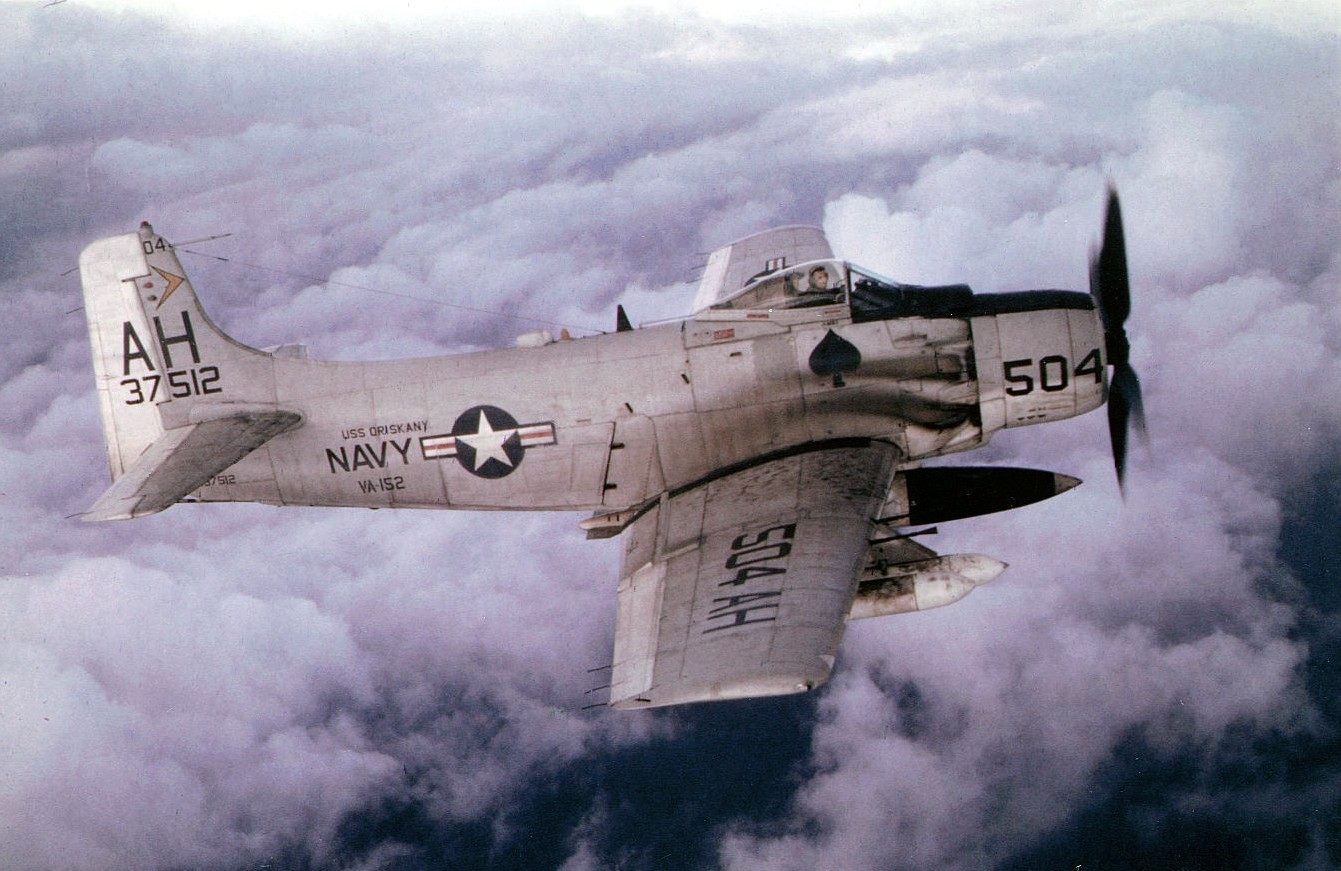
Douglas Skyraider, 1966

- D: Douglas
  - AD Skyraider – redesignated from BT2D, redesignated A-1 in 1962
  - A2D Skyshark
  - A3D Skywarrior – redesignated A-3 in 1962
  - A4D Skyhawk – redesignated A-4 in 1962
- F: Grumman
  - AF Guardian – redesignated from TB3F
  - A2F Intruder – redesignated A-6 in 1962
- H: McDonnell Douglas
  - AH Phantom II
- J: North American
  - AJ Savage – redesignated A-2 in 1962
  - A2J Super Savage
  - A3J Vigilante – redesignated A-5 in 1962
- M: Martin
  - AM Mauler – redesignated from BTM
- U: Vought
  - AU Corsair – redesignated from F4U-6
  - A2U Cutlass

=== Bomber ===
==== B: Bomber (1931–1943) ====
- D: Douglas
  - BD Havoc
- G: Great Lakes
  - BG
  - B2G
- M: Martin
  - BM – redesignated from T5M
- N: Naval Aircraft Factory
  - BN (Note: Program canceled prior to construction of a prototype.)
- T: Northrop
  - BT
  - B2T
- Y: Consolidated
  - BY Fleetster
  - B2Y

==== BF: Bomber fighter (1934–1937) ====
- B: Boeing
  - BFB – redesignated from F6B
- C: Curtiss
  - BFC Goshawk – redesignated from F11C
  - BF2C Goshawk

==== BT: Bomber torpedo (1942–1945) ====
- C: Curtiss
  - BTC
  - BT2C
- D: Douglas
  - BTD Destroyer
  - BT2D Destroyer II – redesignated AD in 1946
- K: Kaiser-Fleetwings
  - BTK
- M: Martin
  - BTM Mauler – redesignated AM in 1946

=== Drone/missile ===
==== BD: Bomber drone (1944) ====
- R: Interstate
  - BDR

==== DS: Antisubmarine drone (1959–1962) ====
- N: Gyrodyne
  - DSN DASH – redesignated H-50 in 1962

==== KA: Surface-to-air missile (1946–1947) ====
For a brief period, surface-to-air missiles used the same designation system as aircraft.

- M: Martin
  - KAM Little Joe
- N: Naval Aircraft Factory
  - KAN Little Joe
  - KA2N Gorgon IIA – redesignated CTV-4 in 1947
  - KA3N Gorgon III – redesignated CTV-6 and RTV-4 in 1947
- Q: Fairchild
  - KAQ Lark – redesignated SAM-2 in 1947
- S: Sperry
  - KAS Sparrow – redesignated AAM-2 in 1947
- Y: Convair
  - KAY Lark – redesignated SAM-4 in 1947

==== KD: Unified sequence (1945–1962) ====
- A: Ryan
  - KDA Firebee – redesignated QM-34 in 1963
- B: Beechcraft
  - KDB Cardinal – redesignated QM-39 in 1963
  - KD2B Jayhawk – redesignated QM-37 in 1963
- C: Curtiss-Wright
  - KDC
  - KD2C Skeet
  - KD3C Skeet
- D: McDonnell (changed to H in 1946)
  - KDD Katydid – redesignated from TD2D, redesignated KDH in 1946
- G: Globe
  - KDG Snipe
  - KD2G Firefly
  - KD3G Snipe
  - KD4G Quail
  - KD5G
  - KD6G Firefly – redesignated QM-40 in 1963
- H: McDonnell (changed from D in 1946)
  - KDH Katydid – redesignated from KDD
- M: Martin
  - KDM Plover
- N: Naval Aircraft Factory
  - KDN Gorgon – redesignated from TD2N
  - KD2N Gorgon – redesignated from TD3N
- R: Radioplane
  - KDR Quail – redesignated from TD4D
  - KD2R Quail – redesignated QM-36 in 1963
  - KD3R – skipped
  - KD4R
- T: Temco
  - KDT Teal
- U: Vought
  - KDU Regulus
  - KD2U Regulus II – redesignated QM-15 in 1963

==== KG: Air-to-surface missile (1946–1947) ====
For a brief period, air-to-surface missiles used the same designation system as aircraft.

- N: Naval Aircraft Factory
  - KGN Gorgon IIC – redesignated CTV-2 in 1947
- W: Willys-Overland
  - KGW Loon – redesignated LTV-1 in 1947

==== KS: Anti-ship missile (1946–1947) ====
For a brief period, anti-ship missiles used the same designation system as aircraft.

- D: McDonnell
  - KSD Gargoyle – redesignated from LBD, redesignated RTV-2 in 1947

==== KU: Research missile (1946–1947) ====
For a brief period, research missiles used the same designation system as aircraft.

- D: McDonnell
  - KUD Gargoyle – redesignated from LBD, redesignated RTV-2 in 1947
- M: Martin
  - KUM Gorgon IV – redesignated PTV-2 in 1947
- N: Naval Aircraft Factory
  - KUN Gorgon IIC – redesignated CTV-2 in 1947
  - KU2N Gorgon IIA – redesignated CTV-4 in 1947
  - KU3N Gorgon III – redesignated CTV-6 and RTV-4 in 1947
- W: Willys-Overland
  - KUW Loon – redesignated LTV-1 in 1947

==== TD: Target drone (1942–1945) ====
- C: Culver
  - TDC Cadet
  - TD2C Turkey
  - TD3C
  - TD4C
- D: Radioplane
  - TDD
  - TD2D – skipped to avoid confusion with the McDonnell TD2D
  - TD3D – skipped to avoid confusion with the Frankfort TD3D
  - TD4D – redesignated KDR in 1945
- D: McDonnell
  - TDD – skipped to avoid confusion with the Radioplane TDD
  - TD2D Katydid – redesignated KDD in 1945
- D: Frankfort
  - TDD – skipped to avoid confusion with the Radioplane TDD
  - TD2D – skipped to avoid confusion with the McDonnell TD2D
  - TD3D
- L: Bell
  - TDL Airacobra – redesignated F2L-1K
- N: Naval Aircraft Factory
  - TDN
  - TD2N Gorgon – redesignated KDN in 1946
  - TD3N Gorgon IIC – redesignated KD2N in 1946
- R: Interstate
  - TDR
  - TD2R
  - TD3R

==== U: Unpiloted aircraft (1946–1955) ====
- C: Culver
  - UC

=== Fighter ===
==== F: Fighter (1922–1962) ====
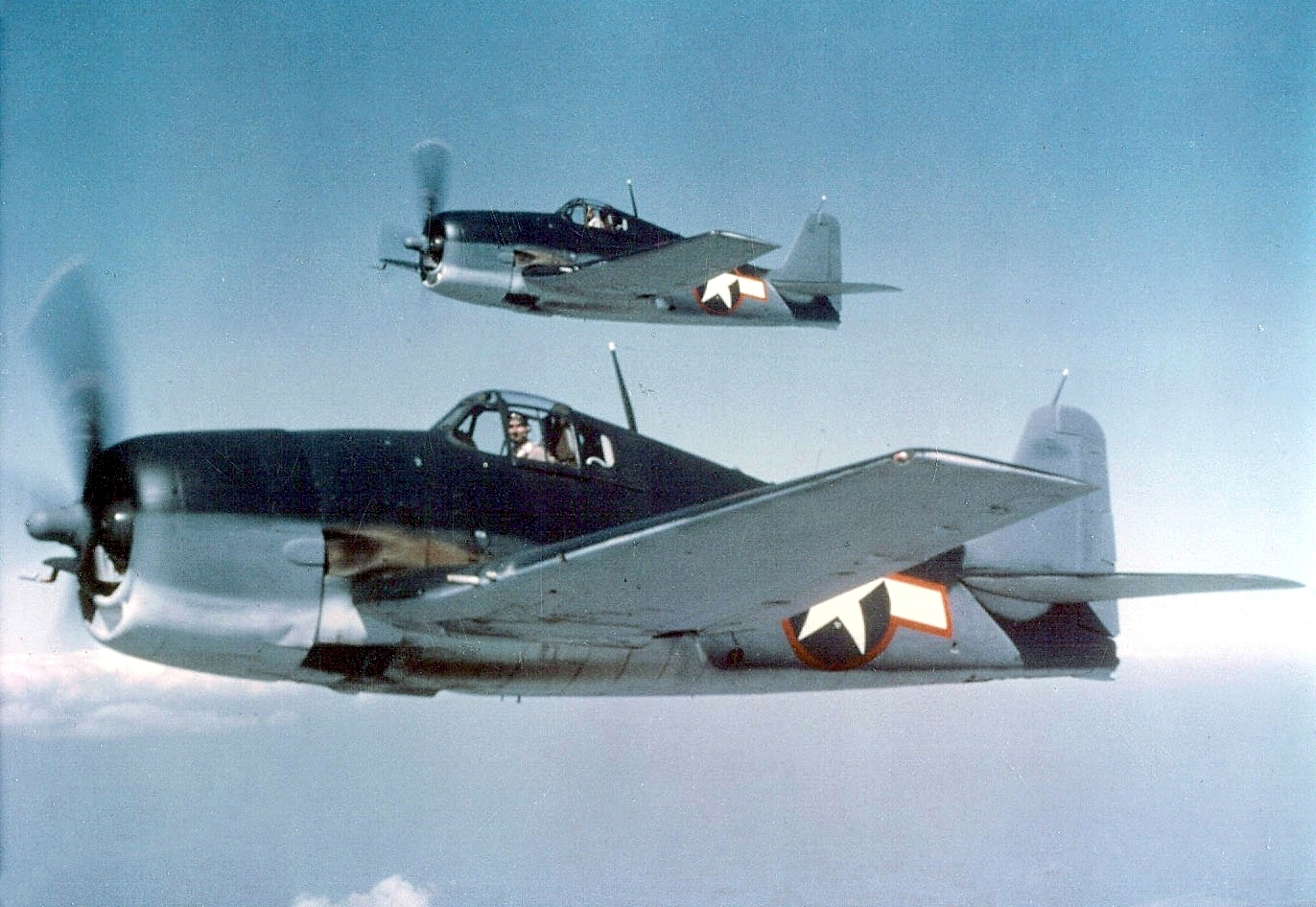
Grumman F6F-3 Hellcats in 1943

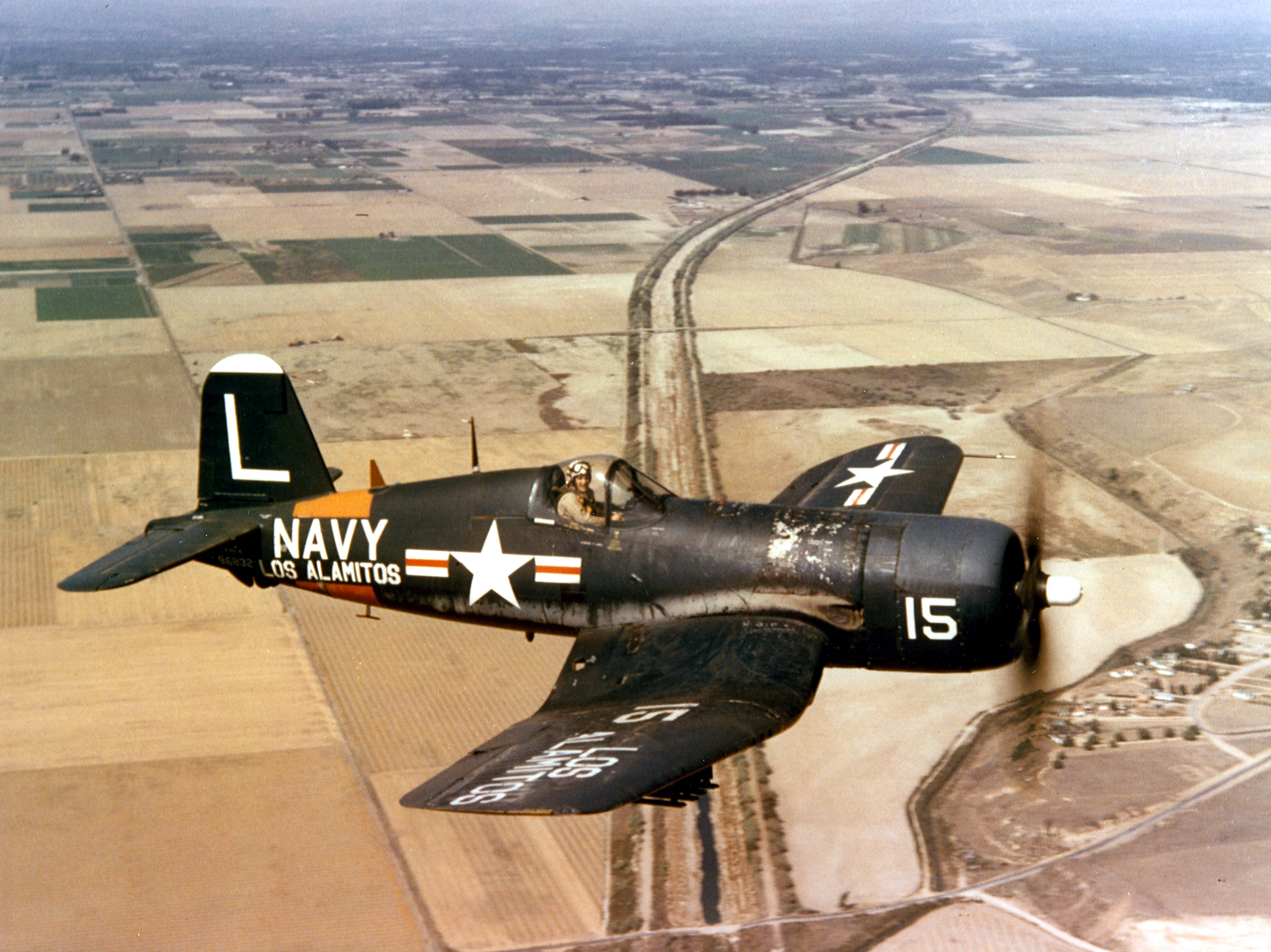
Vought F4U-4 Corsair, 1950

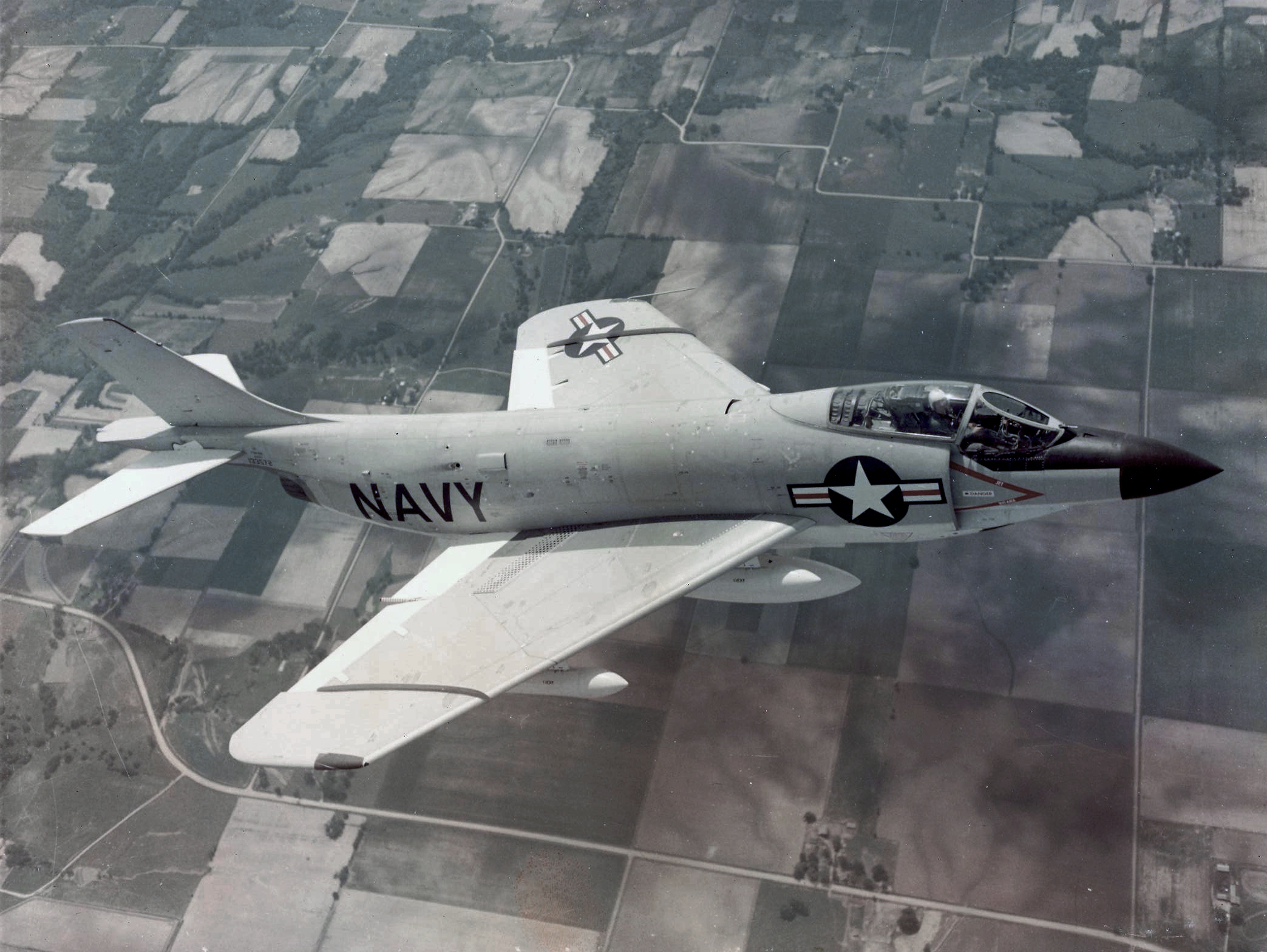
McDonnell F3H-2N Demon, 1956

- A: General Aircraft
  - FA
- A: Brewster
  - FA – skipped to avoid confusion with the General Aircraft FA
  - F2A Buffalo
  - F3A Corsair
- B: Boeing
  - FB
  - F2B
  - F3B
  - F4B
  - F5B
  - F6B – redesignated BFB in 1934
  - F7B
  - F8B
- C: Curtiss
  - FC
  - F2C
  - F3C
  - F4C
  - F5C – skipped to avoid confusion with the earlier Curtiss F-5L
  - F6C Hawk
  - F7C Seahawk
  - F8C Falcon/Helldiver
  - F9C Sparrowhawk
  - F10C Helldiver
  - F11C Goshawk – redesignated BFC in 1934
  - F12C Helldiver – redesignated S4C in 1933
  - F13C
  - F14C
  - F15C
- D: Douglas
  - FD
  - F2D – skipped to avoid confusion with the McDonnell F2D
  - F3D Skyknight – redesignated F-10 in 1962
  - F4D Skyray – redesignated F-6 in 1962
  - F5D Skylancer
  - F6D Missileer
- D: McDonnell (changed to H in 1946)
  - FD – conflicting designation, assigned after the original FD was canceled, redesignated FH in 1946
  - F2D Banshee – redesignated F2H in 1946
- F: Grumman
  - FF
  - F2F
  - F3F
  - F4F Wildcat
  - F5F Skyrocket
  - F6F Hellcat
  - F7F Tigercat
  - F8F Bearcat
  - F9F Panther – redesignated F-9 in 1962
    - F9F-6/-8 Cougar – redesignated F-9F/J in 1962
  - F10F Jaguar
  - F11F Tiger – redesignated F-11 in 1962
    - F11F-1F/2 Super Tiger – redesignated F-11B in 1962
  - F12F – unofficial
- G: Eberhart
  - FG
  - F2G
- G: Goodyear
  - FG Corsair
  - F2G Corsair
- H: Hall
  - FH
- H: McDonnell (changed from D in 1946)
  - FH Phantom – redesignated from FD
  - F2H Banshee – redesignated from F2D, redesignated F-2 in 1962
  - F3H Demon – redesignated F-3 in 1962
  - F4H Phantom II – redesignated F-4 in 1962
- J: Berliner-Joyce
  - FJ
  - F2J
  - F3J
- J: North American Aviation
  - FJ Fury
    - FJ-2/-3 Fury – redesignated F-1C/D in 1962
    - FJ-4 Fury – redesignated F-1E/F in 1962
- K: James V. Martin
  - KF
- L: Loening
  - FL
- L: Bell
  - FL Airabonita
  - F2L Airacomet
    - F2L-1K Airacobra
  - F3L – unofficial
- M: General Motors
  - FM Wildcat
  - F2M Wildcat
  - F3M Bearcat
- O: Lockheed (changed to V in 1951)
  - FO Lightning
  - FO – conflicting designation, assigned after the original FO was retired, redesignated FV in 1951
- R: Ryan
  - FR Fireball
  - F2R Dark Shark
- S: Supermarine
  - FS Spitfire – unofficial
- T: Northrop
  - FT
  - F2T Black Widow
- U: Vought
  - FU
  - F2U
  - F3U
  - F4U Corsair
  - F5U
  - F6U Pirate
  - F7U Cutlass
  - F8U Crusader – redesignated F-8 in 1962
    - F8U-3 Crusader III
- V: Canadian Vickers
  - FV Hellcat
- V: Lockheed (changed from O in 1951)
  - FV – redesignated from FO
- W: Wright
  - WF – skipped to avoid confusion with the Wright WP
  - F2W
  - F3W Apache
- W: CC&F
  - FW – skipped to avoid confusion with the Wright WP
  - F2W – skipped to avoid confusion with the Wright F2W
  - F3W – skipped to avoid confusion with the Wright F3W
  - F4W Bearcat
- Y: Convair
  - FY Pogo
  - F2Y Sea Dart – redesignated F-7 in 1962

==== P: Pursuit (1923) ====
- W: Wright
  - WP

=== Glider ===
==== LB: Bomb glider ====
- D: McDonnell
  - LBD Gargoyle – redesignated KSD and KUD in 1946
- E: Pratt-Read
  - LBE
- P: Piper
  - LBP
- T: Taylorcraft
  - LBT

==== LN: Trainer glider (1941–1945) ====
- E: Pratt-Read
  - LNE
- P: Piper
  - LNP Grasshopper
- R: Aeronca
  - LNR Grasshopper
- S: Schweizer
  - LNS
- T: Taylorcraft
  - LNT Grasshopper

==== LR: Transport glider (1941–1945) ====
- A: Allied
  - LRA
  - LR2A
- G: AGA Aviation
  - LRG
- H: Snead
  - LRH
- N: Naval Aircraft Factory
  - LRN
  - LR2N
- Q: Bristol
  - LRQ
- W: Waco
  - LRW
  - LR2W

=== Helicopters ===
==== HC: Crane (1952–1955) ====
- H: McDonnell
  - HCH

==== HJ: Utility (1944–1949) ====
- D: McDonnell (changed to H in 1946)
  - HJD Whirlaway
- H: McDonnell (changed from D in 1946)
  - HJH Whirlaway
- P: Piasecki
  - HJP Retriever – redesignated HUP in 1950
- S: Sikorsky
  - HJS

==== HO: Observation (1944–1962) ====
- C: Convertawings
  - HOC
- E: Hiller
  - HOE Hornet
- G: Gyrodyne
  - HOG Rotorcycle
- K: Kaman
  - HOK Huskie – redesignated H-43 in 1962
- S: Sikorsky
  - HOS
  - HO2S
  - HO3S
  - HO4S – redesignated UH-19 in 1962
  - HO5S

==== HN: Trainer (1944–1948) ====
- S: Sikorsky
  - HNS

==== HR: Transport (1944–1962) ====
- B: Boeing Vertol
  - HRB Sea Knight – redesignated CH-46 in 1962
- H: McDonnell
  - HRH
- P: Piasecki
  - HRP Rescuer
- S: Sikorsky
  - HRS – redesignated CH-19 in 1962
  - HR2S – redesignated CH-37 in 1962
  - HR3S Sea King – redesignated CH-3 in 1962

==== HS: Antisubmarine (1951–1962) ====
- L: Bell
  - HSL
- S: Sikorsky
  - HSS-1 Seabat – redesignated SH-34 in 1962
  - HSS-2 Sea King – redesignated SH-3 in 1962

==== HT: Trainer (1948–1962) ====
- E: Hiller
  - HTE Raven
- K: Kaman
  - HTK Huskie – redesignated H-43 in 1962
- L: Bell
  - HTL – redesignated H-13 in 1962

==== HU: Utility (1950–1962) ====
- K: Kaman
  - HUK Huskie – redesignated H-43 in 1962
  - HU2K Seasprite – redesignated UH-2 in 1962
- L: Bell
  - HUL – redesignated H-13 in 1962
- M: McCulloch
  - HUM
- P: Piasecki
  - HUP Retriever– redesignated UH-25 in 1962
- S: Sikorsky
  - HUS Seahorse – redesignated CH-34 in 1962
  - HU2S Sea Guard – redesignated HH-52 in 1962

==== R: Rotorcycle (1954–1959) ====
- E: Hiller
  - ROE Rotorcycle
- N: Gyrodyne
  - RON Rotorcycle

=== Marine Expeditionary ===
==== M: Marine Expeditionary (1922–1923) ====
- E: Elias
  - EM
- N: Naval Aircraft Factory
  - NM

=== Observation ===
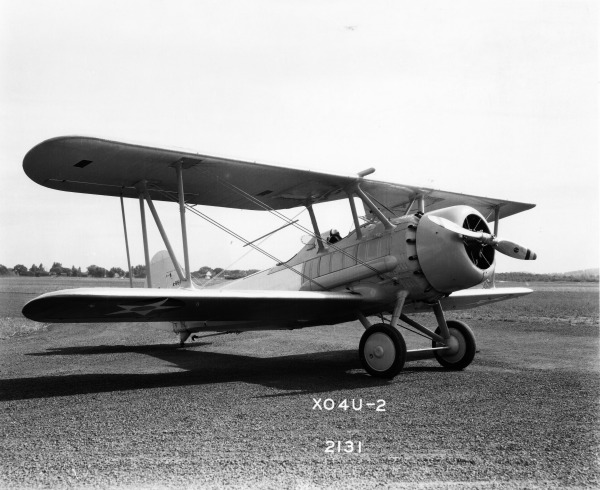
O4U Corsair

==== O: Observation (1922–1962) ====
- B: Boeing
  - OB
  - O2B
- C: Curtiss
  - OC Falcon
  - O2C Falcon
  - O3C Seagull
- D: Douglas
  - OD
  - O2D
- E: Elias
  - EO
- E: Cessna
  - OE Bird Dog – redesignated O-1 in 1962
- F: Grumman
  - OF Mohawk
- H: Huff Daland
  - HO
- J: Berliner-Joyce
  - OJ
- K: Keystone
  - OK
- L: Loening
  - OL
  - O2L
- M: Martin
  - MO
  - M2O
  - O3M
- N: Naval Aircraft Factory
  - NO
  - O2N
- O: Viking
  - OO
- P: Pitcairn
  - OP
    - OP-2
- U: Vought
  - UO
  - O2U Corsair
  - O3U Corsair
  - O4U Corsair
  - O5U
- Y: Stinson
  - OY Sentinel
- Z: Pennsylvania
  - OZ

==== OS: Observation scout (1935–1945) ====
- E: Edo
  - OSE
- N: Naval Aircraft Factory
  - OSN
  - OS2N Kingfisher
- S: Stearman
  - OSS
- U: Vought
  - OSU Corsair
  - OS2U Kingfisher

=== Patrol ===
==== P: Patrol (1923–1962) ====
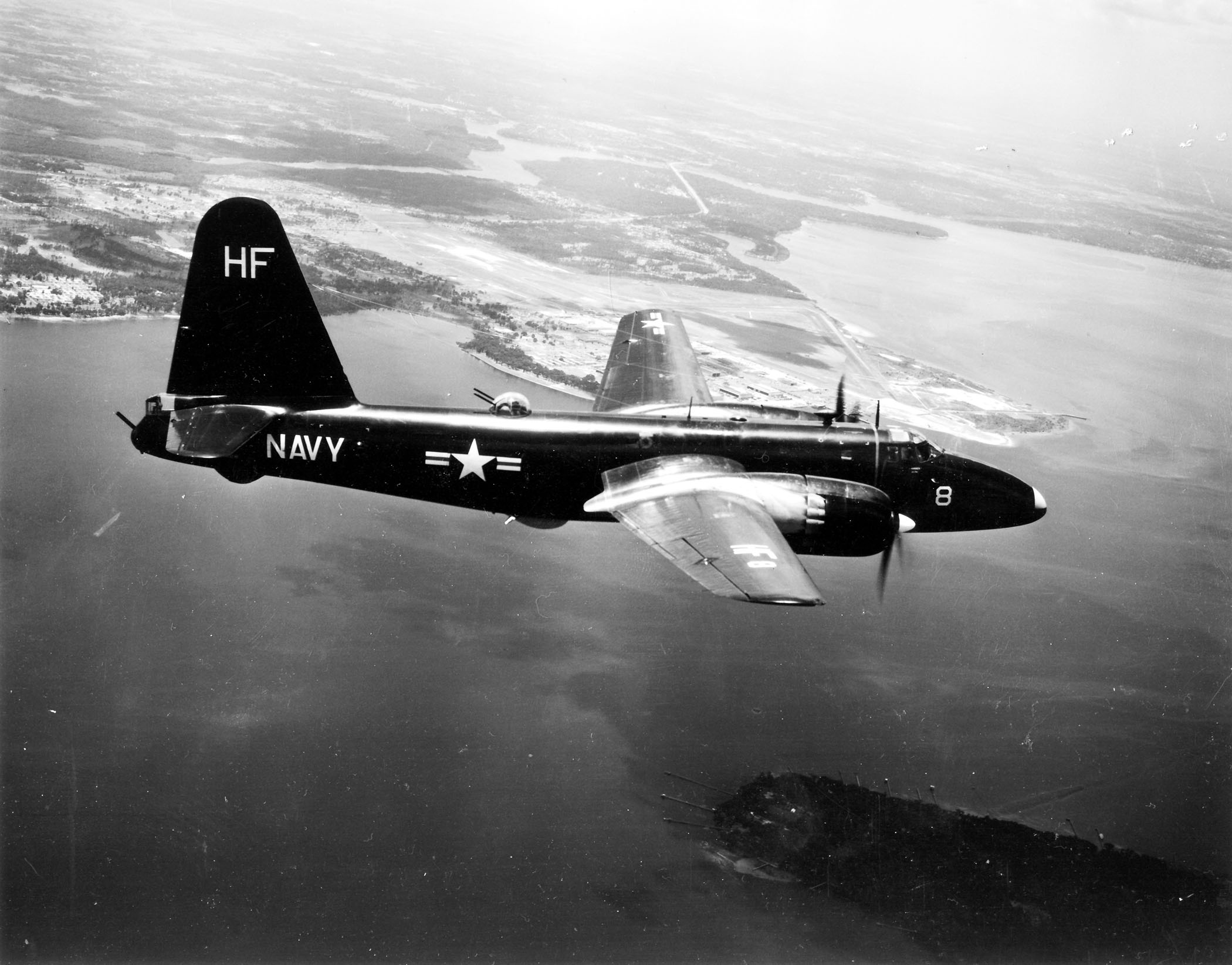
P2V-2 Neptune over NAS Jacksonville, 1953

- B: Boeing
  - PB
  - PB Flying Fortress – conflicting designation, assigned after the original PB was canceled
  - P2B Superfortress
  - P3B
- D: Douglas
  - PD
  - P2D
  - P3D
- F: Grumman
  - PF Albatross
- H: Hall
  - PH
  - P2H
- J: General Aviation
  - PJ
- K: Keystone
  - PK
- M: Martin
  - PM
  - P2M
  - P3M
  - P4M Mercator
  - P5M Marlin
  - P6M SeaMaster
  - P7M SubMaster
- N: Naval Aircraft Factory
  - PN
  - P2N – redesignated P4N to avoid confusion with the Curtiss P2N
  - P3N – skipped
  - P4N – redesignated from P2N
- N: Curtiss
  - PN – skipped
  - P2N
- O: Lockheed (changed to V in 1951)
  - PO Warning Star – redesignated WV in 1951
- S: Sikorsky
  - PS
  - P2S
- V: Lockheed-Vega
  - PV Ventura/Harpoon
  - P2V Neptune
- V: Lockheed (changed from O in 1951)
  - PV – skipped to avoid confusion with the Lockheed-Vega PV
  - P2V – skipped to avoid confusion with the Lockheed-Vega P2V Neptune
  - P3V Orion
- Y: Consolidated/Convair
  - PY
  - P2Y
  - P3Y Catalina – redesignated PBY in 1935
  - P4Y Corregidor
  - P5Y Tradewind
  - P6Y

==== PB: Patrol bomber (1935–1962) ====
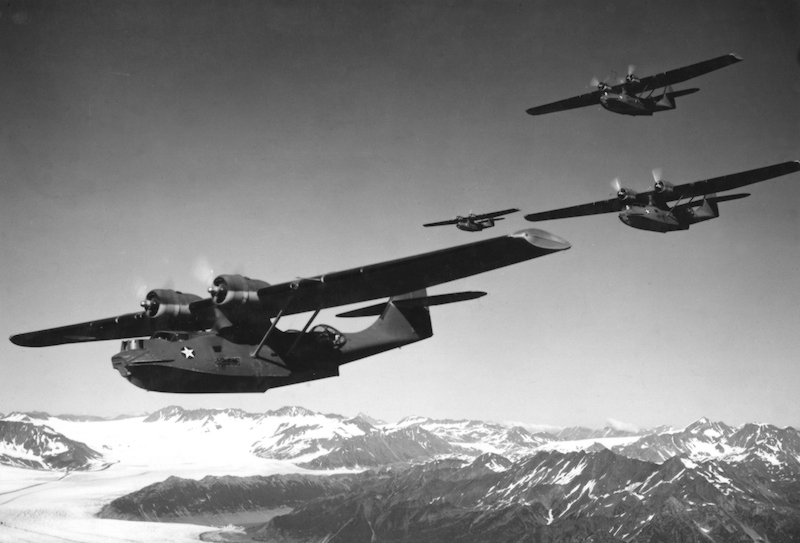
A flight of PBY-5 Catalinas over the Aleutian Islands

- B: Boeing
  - PBB Sea Ranger
  - PB2B Canso
- J: North American
  - PBJ Mitchell
- M: Martin
  - PBM Mariner
  - PB2M Mars
- N: Naval Aircraft Factory
  - PBN Nomad
- O: Lockheed
  - PBO Hudson
- S: Sikorsky
  - PBS
- V: Canadian Vickers
  - PBV Catalina
- Y: Consolidated
  - PBY Catalina – redesignated from P3Y
  - PB2Y Coronado
  - PB3Y
  - PB4Y Liberator
    - PB4Y-2 Privateer

==== PT: Patrol torpedo (1922) ====
No designations were assigned in this sequence.

==== PTB: Patrol torpedo bomber (1937–1962) ====
- H: Hall
  - PTBH

=== Racer ===
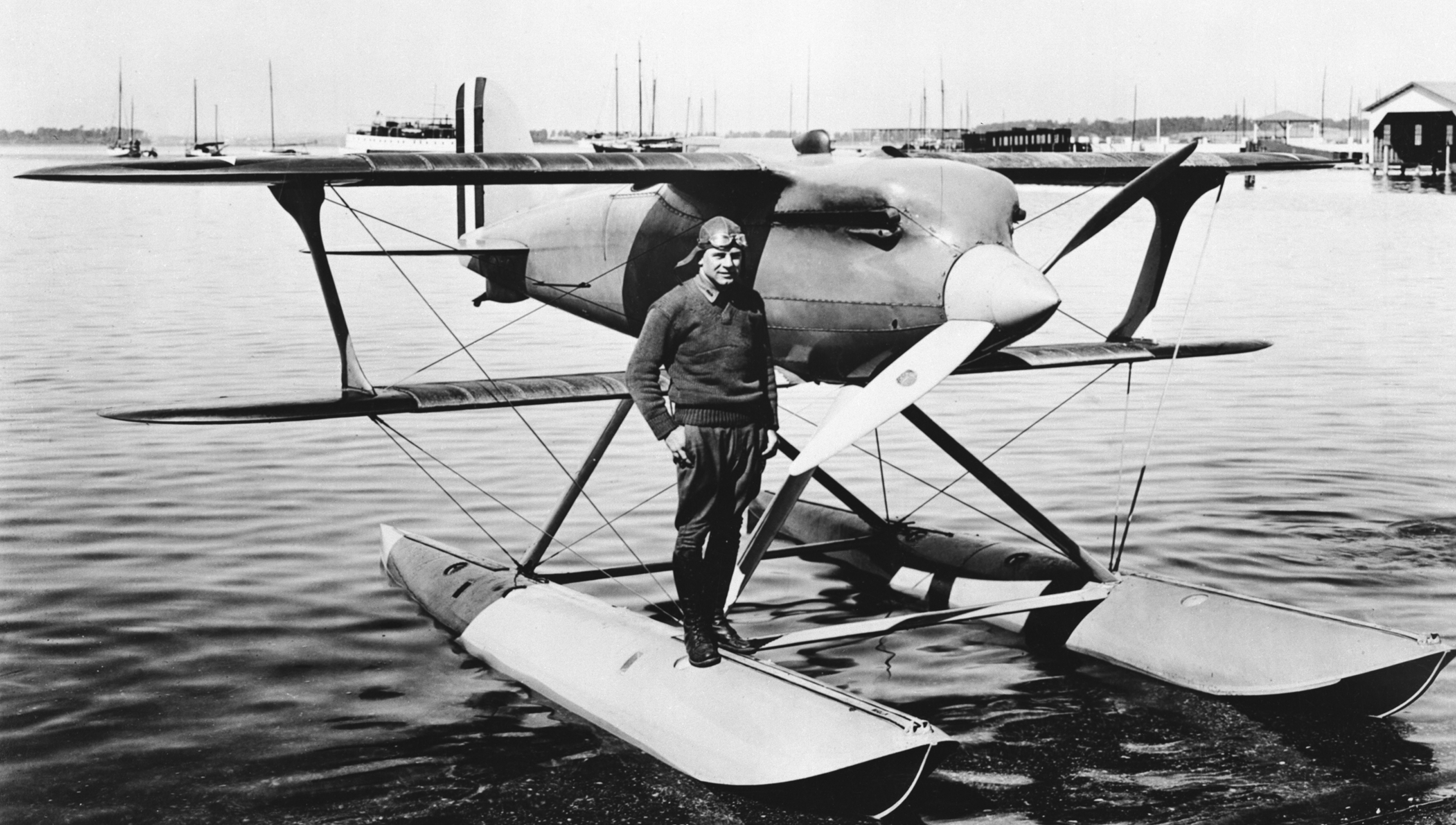
R3C-2

==== R: Racer (1922–1928) ====
- B: Bee Line
  - BR
- C: Curtiss
  - CR
  - R2C
  - R3C

=== Scout ===
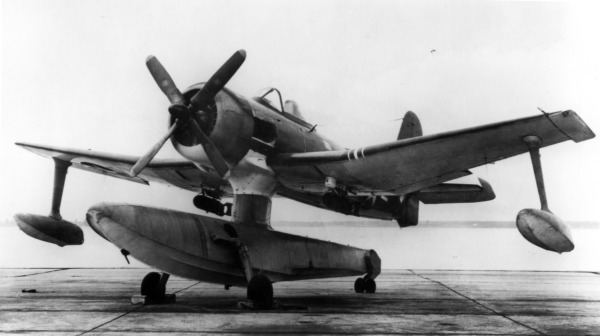
SC Seahawk

==== S: Scout (1922–1946) ====
- C: Curtiss
  - CS/SC
  - SC Seahawk – conflicting designation, assigned after the original SC was retired
  - S2C Shrike
  - S3C Falcon
  - S4C Helldiver – redesignated SBC in 1935
- DW: Dayton-Wright
  - SDW
- E: Bellanca
  - SE
- E: Edo
  - SE – skipped to avoid confusion with the Bellanca SE
  - S2E
- F: Grumman
  - SF
- G: Great Lakes
  - SG
- HP: Handley Page
  - HPS
- L: Loening
  - SL
  - S2L
- M: Martin
  - MS
- S: Sikorsky
  - SS
- U: Vought
  - SU Corsair
- X: Cox-Klemin
  - XS

==== SB: Scout bomber (1934–1946) ====
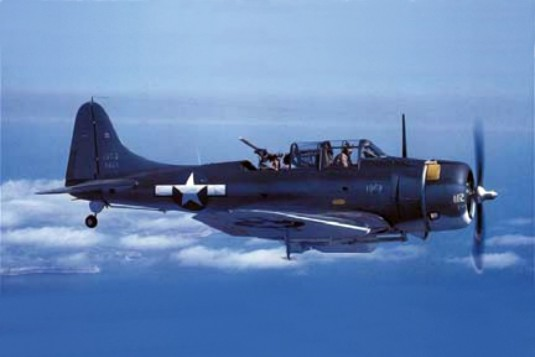
Douglas SBD-5 Dauntless

- A: Brewster
  - SBA
  - SB2A Buccaneer
- C: Curtiss-Wright
  - SBC Helldiver
  - SB2C Helldiver
  - SB3C
- D: Douglas
  - SBD Dauntless
  - SB2D Destroyer
- F: Grumman
  - SBF
- F: Fairchild
  - SBF Helldiver
- G: Great Lakes
  - SBG
- N: Naval Aircraft Factory
  - SBN
- U: Vought
  - SBU Corsair
  - SB2U Vindicator
  - SB3U
- W: CC&F
  - SBW Helldiver

==== SN: Scout trainer (1939–1948) ====
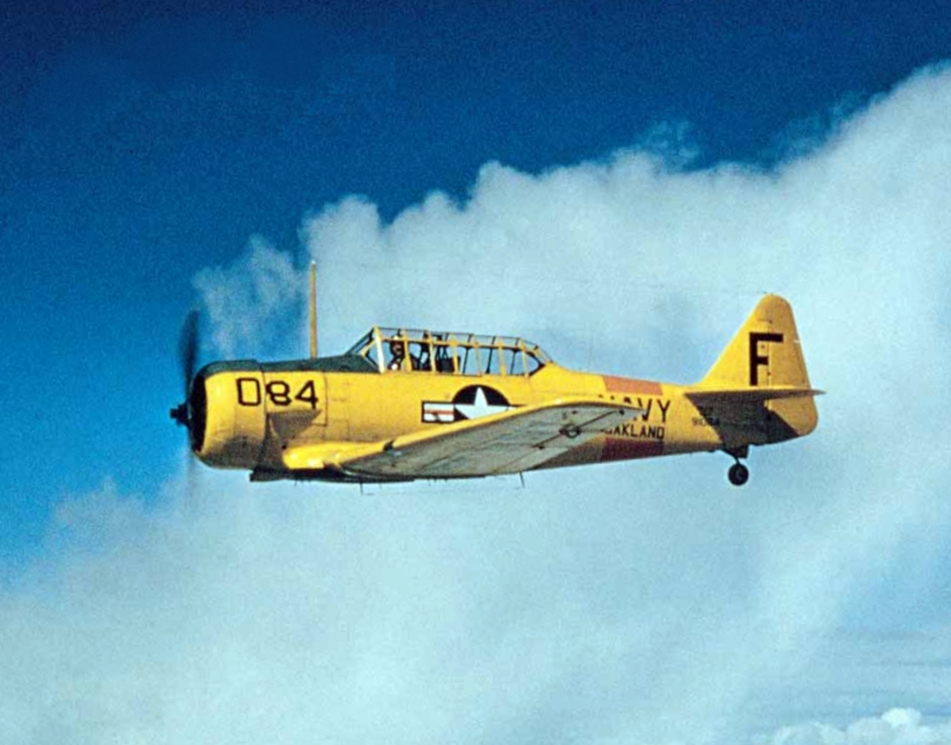
SNJ-5 Texan, 1950

- B: Beechcraft
  - SNB Navigator – redesignated C-45 in 1962
- C: Curtiss
  - SNC Falcon
- J: North American
  - SNJ Texan
  - SN2J
- V: Vultee
  - SNV Valiant

==== SO: Scout observation (1934–1946) ====
- C: Curtiss
  - SOC Seagull
  - SO2C Seagull
  - SO3C Seamew
- E: Bellanca
  - SOE
- K: Fairchild
  - SOK
- N: Naval Aircraft Factory
  - SON Seagull
- R: Ryan
  - SOR Seagull (Note: Proposed alternate manufacturer, contract canceled.)
- U: Vought
  - SOU – skipped to avoid confusion with the Vought OSU
  - SO2U

=== Tanker ===
==== G: Tanker (1958–1962) ====
- V: Lockheed
  - GV Hercules

=== Torpedo ===
==== T: Torpedo (1922–1935) ====
- B: Boeing
  - TB
- BS: Blackburn
  - BST
- C: Curtiss
  - CT
- D: Douglas
  - DT
  - T2D
  - T3D
- E: Detroit
  - TE
- F: Fokker
  - FT
- G: Great Lakes
  - TG
- M: Martin
  - MT/TM
  - T2M – redesignated SC in 1925
  - T3M
  - T4M
  - T5M – redesignated BM in 1931
  - T6M
- N: Naval Aircraft Factory
  - TN
  - T2N
- S: Stout
  - ST

==== TB: Torpedo bomber (1935–1946) ====
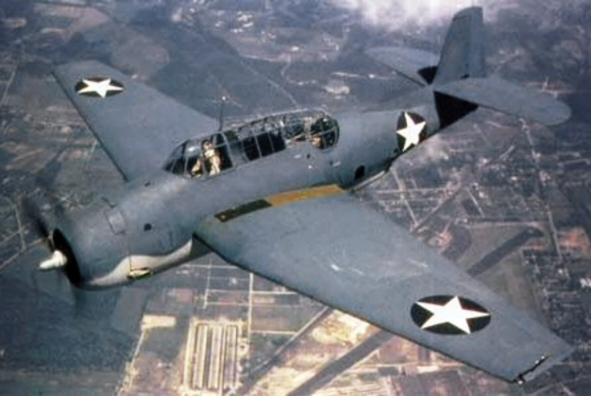
Grumman TBF Avenger in mid-1942

- D: Douglas
  - TBD Devastator
  - TB2D Skypirate
- F: Grumman
  - TBF Avenger
  - TB2F
  - TB3F Guardian – redesignated AF in 1946
- G: Great Lakes
  - TBG
- M: General Motors
  - TBM Avenger
- U: Vought
  - TBU Sea Wolf
- V: Vultee
  - TBV Georgia
- Y: Consolidated
  - TBY Sea Wolf

==== TS: Torpedo scout (1943–1946) ====
- F: Grumman
  - TSF

=== Trainer ===
==== N: Trainer (1922–1948) ====
- B: Boeing
  - NB
  - N2B
- C: Curtiss
  - NC – skipped to avoid confusion with the pre-1922 Curtiss NC
  - N2C Fledgling
- E: Piper
  - NE Grasshopper
- H: Huff Daland
  - HN
- H: Howard
  - NH
- J: North American
  - NJ
- K: Keystone
  - NK
- L: Langley
  - NL
- M: Martin
  - NM – skipped
  - N2M
- N: Naval Aircraft Factory
  - NN – skipped
  - N2N
  - N3N
  - N4N – skipped
  - N5N
- P: Spartan
  - NP
- Q: Fairchild
  - NQ
- R: Ryan
  - NR Recruit
- S: Stearman
  - NS Kaydet
  - N2S Kaydet
- T: New Standard
  - NT
- T: Timm
  - NT – skipped to avoid confusion with the New Standard NT
  - N2T Tutor
- V: Vultee
  - NV
- Y: Consolidated
  - NY
  - N2Y
  - N3Y
  - N4Y

==== T: Trainer (1948–1962) ====
- E: Edo
  - TE
- F: Grumman
  - TF Trader – redesignated C-1 in 1962
- J: North American
  - TJ Texan – redesignated from SNJ-8
  - T2J Buckeye – redesignated T-2 in 1962
  - T3J Sabreliner – redesignated T-39 in 1962
- O: Lockheed (changed to V in 1951)
  - TO Shooting Star – redesignated TV in 1951
    - TO-2 Shooting Star – redesignated TV-2 in 1951
- T: Temco
  - TT Pinto
- V: Lockheed (changed from O in 1951)
  - TV Shooting Star – redesignated from TO
    - TV-2 Shooting Star – redesignated from TO-2
  - T2V SeaStar – redesignated T-1 in 1962

=== Transport ===
==== G: Transport, single engine (1939–1941) ====
- B: Beechcraft
  - GB Traveler
- H: Howard
  - GH Nightingale
- K: Fairchild
  - GK
- Q: Stinson
  - GQ Reliant

==== R: Transport, 1931–1962 ====
- A: Atlantic
  - RA – redesignated from TA
    - RA-4
- B: Budd
  - RB Conestoga
- C: Curtiss/Curtiss-Wright
  - RC Kingbird
  - R2C – skipped to avoid confusion with the R2C in the Racer sequence
  - R3C – skipped to avoid confusion with the R3C in the Racer sequence
  - R4C Condor
  - R5C Commando
- D: Douglas
  - RD Dolphin
  - R2D
  - R3D
  - R4D – redesignated C-47 in 1962
    - R4D-8 – redesignated C-117 in 1962
  - R5D – redesignated C-54 in 1962
  - R6D – redesignated C-118 in 1962
- E: Bellanca
  - RE Skyrocket
- K: Kinner
  - RK Envoy
- K: Fairchild (changed to Q in 1942)
  - RK – skipped to avoid confusion with the Kinner RK
  - R2K
- M: Martin
  - RM – redesignated VC-3 in 1962
- N: Stinson (changed to Q in 1934)
  - RN Reliant – redesignated RQ in 1934
- O: Lockheed (changed to V in 1951)
  - RO Altair
  - R2O Electra
  - R3O Electra
  - R4O Super Electra
  - R5O Lodestar
  - R6O Constitution
  - R7O Constellation
- Q: Stinson (changed from N in 1934)
  - RQ Reliant – redesignated from RN
  - R2Q – skipped to avoid confusion with the Fairchild R2Q
  - R3Q Reliant
- Q: Fairchild (changed from K in 1942)
  - RQ
  - R2Q
  - R3Q – skipped to avoid confusion with the Stinson R3Q
  - R4Q Flying Boxcar – redesignated C-119 in 1962
- R: Ford
  - RR
- S: Sikorsky
  - RS
- T: Northrop
  - RT
- V: Lockheed (changed from O in 1951)
  - R6V Constitution
  - R7V Constellation – redesignated C-121G in 1962
    - R7V-2 Super Constellation – redesignated C-121J in 1962
  - R8V Hercules – redesignated C-130 in 1962
- Y: Consolidated/Convair
  - RY Liberator Express
  - R2Y
  - R3Y Tradewind
  - R4Y Samaritan – redesignated C-131 in 1962

==== T: Transport (1922–1931) ====
- A: Atlantic
  - TA – redesignated RA in 1931

=== Utility ===
==== J: Utility (1931–1955) ====
- A: Fokker-America
  - JA
- A: Noorduyn
  - JA Norseman
- B: Beechcraft
  - JB Traveller
- C: Curtiss-Wright
  - JC Kingbird
- D: Douglas
  - JD Invader– redesignated B-26J in 1962
- E: Bellanca
  - JE
- F: Grumman
  - JF Duck
  - J2F Duck
  - J3F Goose
  - J4F Widgeon
- H: Stearman-Hammond
  - JH
- K: Fairchild (changed to Q in 1942)
  - JK
  - J2K
- L: Columbia
  - JL
- M: Martin
  - JM Marauder
- O: Lockheed
  - JO Electra Junior
- Q: Fairchild (changed from K in 1942)
  - JQ
  - J2Q
- R: Ford
  - JR
- W: Waco
  - JW
  - J2W

==== JR: Utility transport (1935–1955) ====
- B: Beechcraft
  - JRB Expeditor
- C: Cessna
  - JRC Bobcat
- F: Grumman
  - JRF Goose
  - JR2F Albatross – redesignated UF in 1955
- K: Nash-Kelvinator
  - JRK
- M: Martin
  - JRM Mars
  - JR2M Mercury
- S: Sikorsky
  - JRS
  - JR2S

==== U: Utility (1955–1962) ====
- C: de Havilland Canada
  - UC Otter – redesignated U-1 in 1962
  - U2C Beaver
- F: Grumman
  - UF Albatross – redesignated from JR2F, redesignated U-16 in 1962
- O: Piper
  - UO Aztec – conflicting designation, assigned after the original UO was retired; redesignated U-11 in 1962
- V: Lockheed
  - UV JetStar (Note: Proposed commercial off-the-shelf purchase canceled.)
  - UV Hercules – conflicting designation, assigned after the original UV was canceled; redesignated C-130 in 1962

==== Foreign-built utility aircraft (1920–1962) ====
- XDH: (Note: Non-standard XDH designation applied to two de Havilland aircraft procured for use by the U.S. Naval Attaché in London.) de Havilland
  - XDH-60 Moth
  - XDH-80 Puss Moth

== Pre-1954 airship systems ==
=== Commissioned vessels (1922–1935) ===
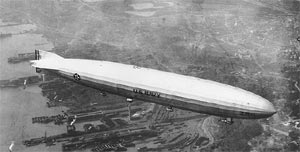
USS Shenandoah (ZR-1)

A series of four airships (two one-offs and two production Akron-class vessels) were the only airships in American history to be commissioned as ships of the United States Navy. Another airship, ZR-2 (the British R.38) crashed and was destroyed before delivery, and was therefore never commissioned.

- USS Shenandoah (ZR-1)
- ZR-2 – reserved but never commissioned
- USS Los Angeles (ZR-3)
- USS Akron (ZRS-4)
- USS Macon (ZRS-5)

=== 1940 system ===
==== ZNN: Training (1940–1946) ====
- ZNN-G – redesignated ZTG in 1947
- ZNN-L – redesignated ZTL in 1947

==== ZNP: Patrol (1940–1946) ====
- ZNP-K – redesignated ZPK in 1947
- ZNP-M – redesignated ZPM in 1947
- ZNP-N – redesignated ZPN in 1947

=== 1947 system ===
==== ZP: Patrol (1947–1953) ====
- ZPK – redesignated from ZNP-K
- ZP2K – redesignated ZSG-2 in 1954
- ZP3K – redesignated ZSG-3 in 1954
- ZP4K – redesignated ZSG-4 in 1954
- ZP5K – redesignated ZS2G-1 in 1954
- ZPM – redesignated from ZNP-M
- ZPN – redesignated from ZNP-N, redesignated ZPG-1 in 1954
- ZP2N – redesignated ZPG-2 in 1954

==== ZT: Training (1947–1953) ====
- ZTG – redesignated from ZNN-G
- ZTL – redesignated from ZNN-L

==== ZW: Airborne Early Warning (1947–1953) ====
- ZWN – redesignated ZPG-3W in 1954

== See also ==
- List of United States Air Force aircraft designations (1919–1962)
- List of United States Army aircraft designations (1956–1962)
- List of United States Tri-Service aircraft designations
- United States military aircraft serial numbers

== Bibliography ==
- Andrade, John M. (1979). U.S. Military Aircraft Designations and Serials Since 1909. Midland Counties Publications. ISBN 0-904597-22-9.
- Bedford, Alan (May–June 1999). "Early American Carrier Jets: Evolving Jet Operations with the US Fleet, Part One". Air Enthusiast (81): 13–19. ISSN 0143-5450.
- Bedford, Alan (July–August 1999). "Early American Carrier Jets: Evolving Jet Operations with the US Fleet, Part Two". Air Enthusiast (82): 18–23. ISSN 0143-5450.
- Bedford, Alan (September–October 1999). "Early American Carrier Jets: Evolving Jet Operations with the US Fleet, Part Three". Air Enthusiast (83): 62–67. ISSN 0143-5450.
- Fahey, James C. 1946 U.S. Army Aircraft 1908-1946
- Grossnick, Roy A. United States Naval Aviation 1910–1995. Naval Historical Center
- Swanborough, Gordon; Bowers, Peter M. (1976). United States Navy Aircraft since 1911 (2nd ed.). Annapolis, Maryland: Naval Institute Press. ISBN 0-87021-968-5.
