= Grumman G-132 =

General information
- Type: Anti-Submarine Warfare (ASW) flying boat
- Manufacturer: Grumman
- Primary user: United States Navy
- Number built: 0

The Grumman G-132 was an unbuilt aircraft designed by Grumman in the 1950s. The design was initiated to meet a requirement of the United States Navy (USN) for an anti-submarine warfare seaplane.

== Design and development ==
The design was for a flying boat that would make use of boundary layer control (BLC) to achieve slow speed flight. It was intended that this would enable the aircraft to land on the open ocean in rough seas and deploy a dipping sonar. The Grumman G-132 was the largest of the three design proposals to be submitted as part of the "Open Ocean Seaplane" requirement, but unlike the Convair XP6Y and Martin P7M SubMaster, it never received a Navy designation.

== Specifications (G-132 projected) ==
General characteristics

- Max takeoff weight: 110,712 lb (50,218 kg)
- Powerplant: 4 × Pratt & Whitney R-2800 Double Wasp radial piston engines, 2,300 hp (1,700 kW) each

Performance

- Maximum speed: 400 mph (650 km/h, 350 kn)
- Range: 1,400 mi (2,200 km, 1,200 nmi)
- Service ceiling: 25,300 ft (7,700 m) service ceiling

Armament

- Missiles, bombs, and depth charges on external hard-points
