= Sikorsky XP2S =

XP2S-1
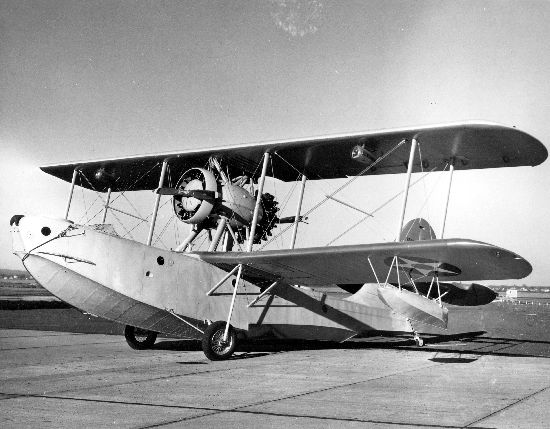

General information
- Type: Patrol flying boat
- National origin: United States
- Manufacturer: Sikorsky Aircraft
- Primary user: United States Navy
- Number built: 1
- Serial: A8642

History
- First flight: June 1932

The Sikorsky XP2S was an American biplane patrol flying boat developed for the United States Navy during the early 1930s.

== Design and development ==
After selling a small quantity of PS / RS patrol / transport amphibians to the Navy, Sikorsky (then a division of United Aircraft Corporation) endeavoured to interest the service in a patrol flying boat. Having received a development contract in mid-1930, Sikorsky delivered a complete aircraft for testing in June 1932. The XP2S-1, as the prototype was designated, was a two-bay, equal-span biplane of mixed construction. Its two R-1340 Wasp radial engines were mounted in a single nacelle in a tandem configuration.

Its overall performance did not exceed that of other biplane patrol boats of the era, and after approximately one year of official trials the Navy cancelled the project.

== Operators ==
United States

- United States Navy

== Specifications (XP2S-1) ==
Data from United States Naval Aviation 1919-1941. Aircraft, Airships and Ships Between the Wars

General characteristics

- Crew: 3
- Length: 44 ft 2 in (13.46 m)
- Wingspan: 56 ft (17 m)
- Wing area: 762 sq ft (70.8 m^{2})
- Empty weight: 6,040 lb (2,740 kg)
- Gross weight: 9,745 lb (4,420 kg)
- Powerplant: 2 × Pratt & Whitney R-1340 radial engine, 450 hp (340 kW) each

Performance

- Maximum speed: 124 mph (200 km/h, 108 kn)estimated
- Service ceiling: 13,900 ft (4,200 m)

Armament

- Guns: 1× flexibly mounted .30 in machine gun in the bow; 1× flexibly mounted .30 in machine gun in the rear cockpit
- Bombs: up to 1000 lbs

== See also ==
Aircraft of comparable role, configuration, and era

- Boeing XPB
- Hall PH
- Hiro H2H
- Naval Aircraft Factory PN

Related lists

- List of United States Navy aircraft designations (pre-1962)
- List of flying boats and floatplanes
