= Snead LRH =

American WWII proposed glider

LRH

General information
- Type: Transport flying boat glider
- Manufacturer: Snead
- Status: cancelled
- Primary user: U.S. Navy
- Number built: 0

The Snead LRH was a proposed amphibious transport glider design for the US Navy during World War II.

== Development ==
The LRH was a twin-hull amphibious glider capable of carrying 24 troops. Two XLRH-1 prototypes and a static test airframe were ordered in April 1942, with Bureau Numbers (BuNu) 11649/11650. Production aircraft were ordered as LRH-1 with BuNus 31586/31635, but the contract was cancelled before the first aircraft was completed.

== Specifications (LRH) ==
Data from

General characteristics

- Length: 48 ft 9 in (14.87 m)
- Wingspan: 110 ft 0 in (33.53 m)

Performance

- Never exceed speed: 180 mph (290 km/h, 160 kn)

== See also ==
Related lists

- List of United States Navy aircraft designations (pre-1962)
- List of gliders
