= AGA Aviation LRG =

American WWII proposed glider

LRG

General information
- Type: Transport flying boat glider
- Manufacturer: AGA Aviation Corporation
- Status: cancelled
- Primary user: U.S. Navy
- Number built: 0

The AGA Aviation LRG was a proposed amphibious transport glider design for the US Navy during World War II.

== Development ==
The LRG was a design for a twin-hull amphibious glider capable of carrying 24 troops (12 in each hull). Length was to be 108 feet 6 inches (33.07 meters), span was to be 57 feet (17 meters), and maximum speed was estimated at 200 mph (320 km/h). Two prototypes along with a static test airframe were ordered on 23 December 1941, and a 40% scale model glider with a civil registration was built to validate the aerodynamic behavior of the LRG. However, development of the LRG and production as the Naval Air Factory LR2N was cancelled in 1943 without either the prototypes or static test airframe ever being built.

== Background ==
The LRG was part of a short-lived United States Navy and United States Marine Corps glider program. The Navy, which had experimented with gliders as early as 1933 for primary flight training, was reluctant about the idea, but with Marine input the Bureau of Aeronautics undertook a glider design study that led to orders for several types. The larger amphibious type was ordered from AGA Aviation as the XLRG-1, but none of the large, roughly 22-man XLRG-1 gliders were built.

== Cancellation ==
The Marine glider program lost priority in February 1943, when it was ordered that no further action be taken until more pressing needs in the Pacific were met, and it became apparent that the distances involved and the limited availability of airfields made gliders, like parachute operations, impractical there. The Commandant of the Marine Corps ordered the program terminated effective 24 June 1943.

== Specification (AGA LRG / NAF LR2N) ==
Data from UNITED STATES MILITARY AIRCRAFT : NAVY : G = AGA Aviation (1942)

General characteristics

- Crew: 2
- Capacity: 24
- Length: 57 ft 0 in (17.37 m)
- Wingspan: 108 ft 6 in (33.07 m)
- Empty weight: 4,800 lb (2,177 kg)

Performance

- Never exceed speed: 200 mph (320 km/h, 170 kn)

== See also ==
Related lists

- List of United States Navy aircraft designations (pre-1962)
- List of gliders
