= Douglas XT3D =

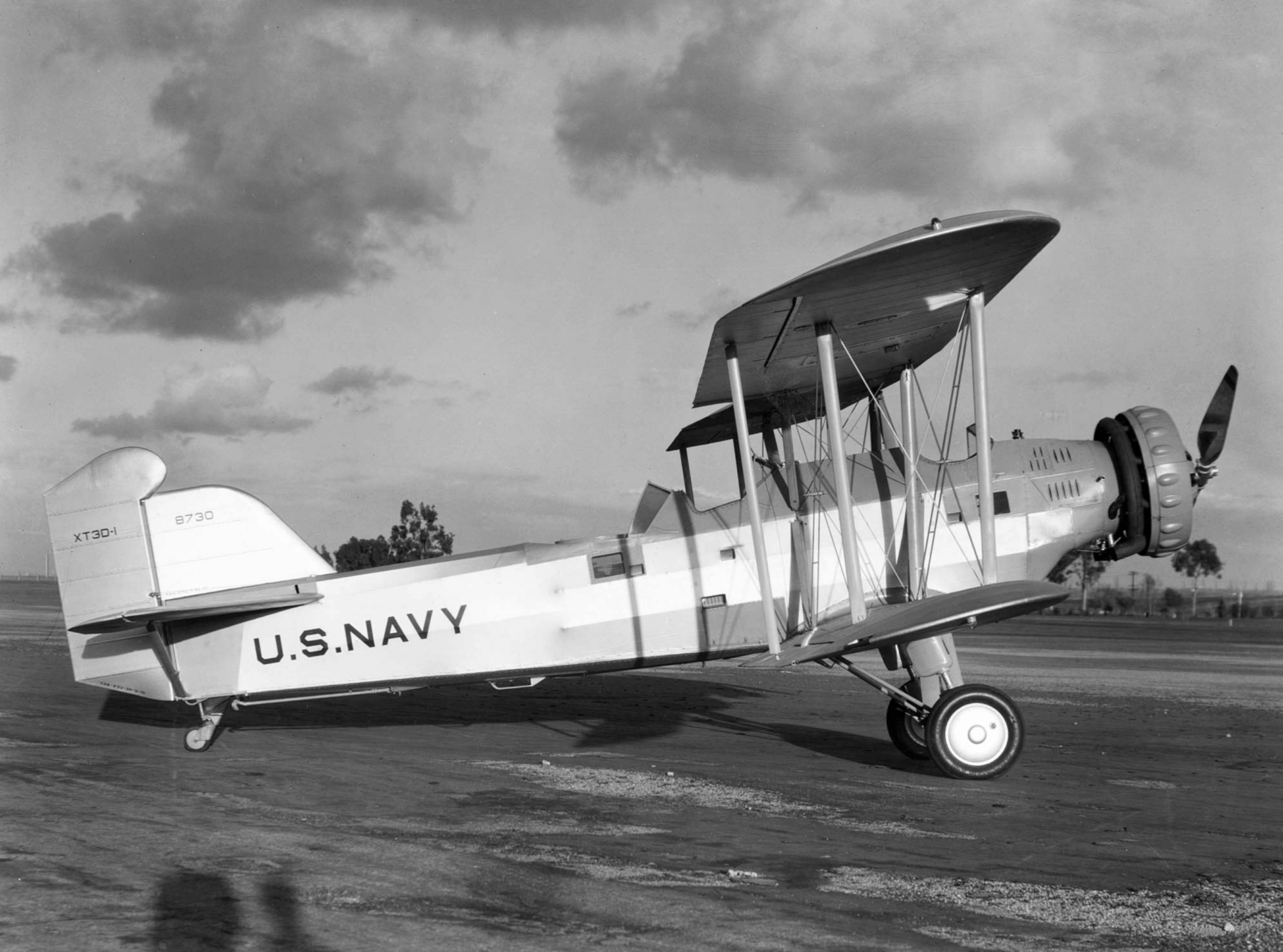
- Douglas XT3D-1

General information
- Type: Three-seat torpedo bomber
- National origin: United States
- Manufacturer: Douglas Aircraft Company
- Primary user: United States Navy
- Number built: 1

History
- First flight: 1931
- Retired: 1941

The Douglas XT3D was an American three-seat torpedo bomber biplane developed by the Douglas Aircraft Company to meet a United States Navy requirement.

== Development ==
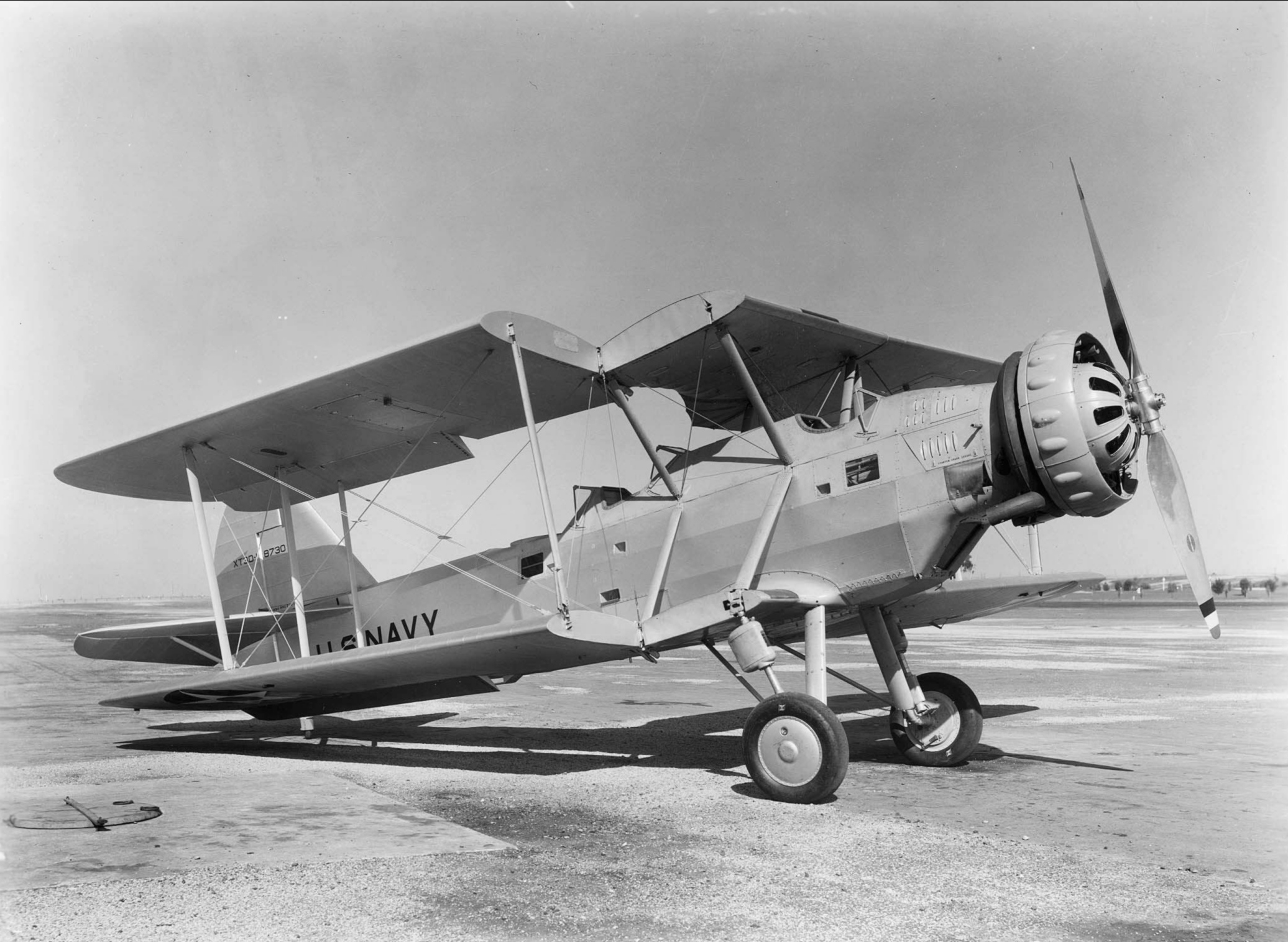
The XT3D-1 with one wing folded.

The XT3D torpedo bomber (BuNo 8730) first flew in 1931. It has been described as a "large and ugly" aircraft. Of metal construction with a fabric covering the XT3D had folding wings and an arrestor hook for carrier operation. With a fixed tailwheel landing gear and powered by a Pratt & Whitney R-1690 Hornet radial engine, the XT3D had three open cockpits, forward for the gunner/bomb-aimer, center for the pilot, rear for another gunner.

The XT3D failed to meet the United States Navy's requirements and after tests was returned to Douglas. It was modified with a more powerful Pratt & Whitney XR-1830-54 radial, and wheel fairings and the two rear cockpits were enclosed. Re-designated XT3D-2, it still failed to pass U.S. Navy trials and was not ordered into production. The U.S. Navy used the prototype for the next ten years as a general-purpose aircraft until relegating it to use as an instructional airframe in 1941.

== Variants ==
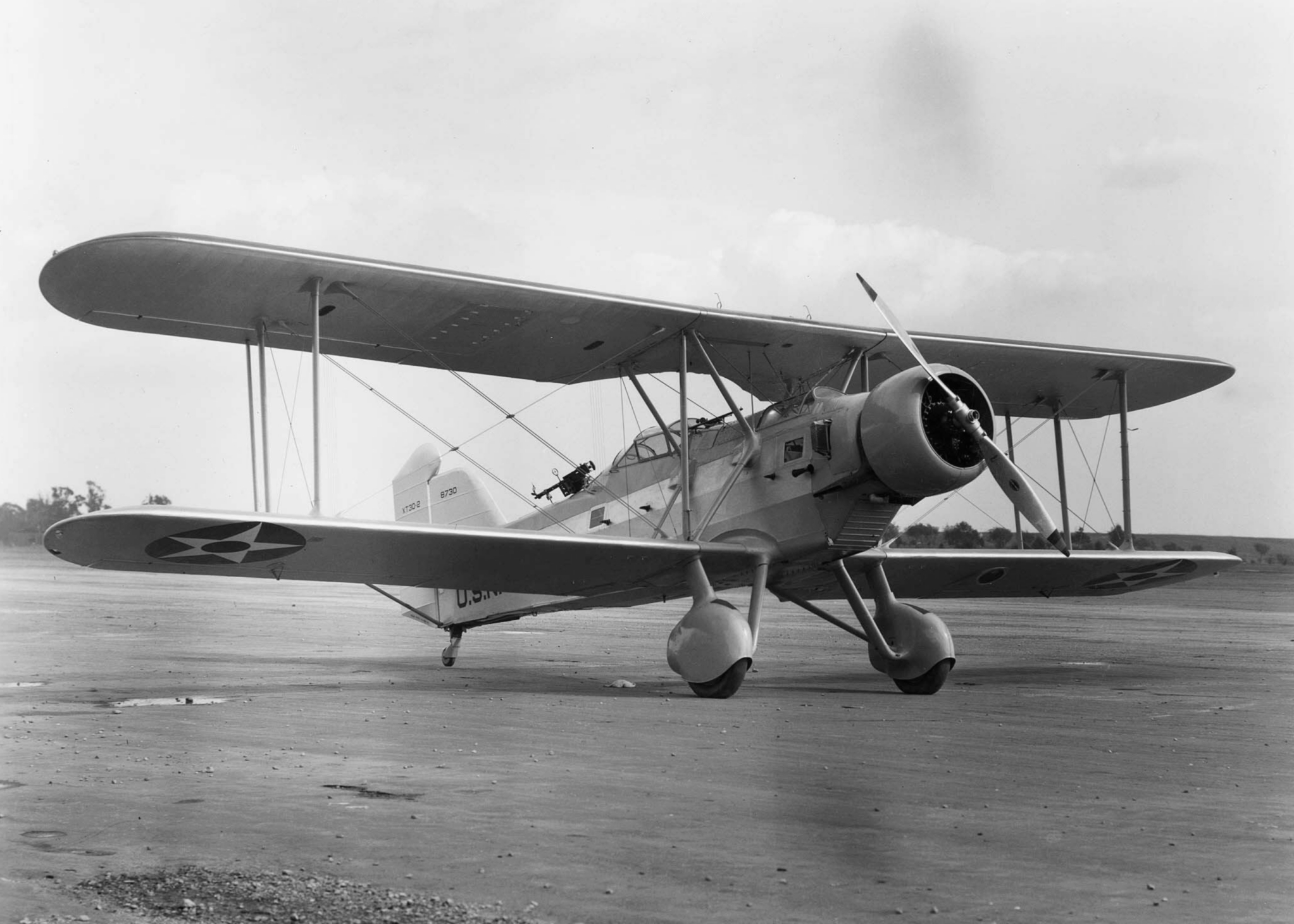
The XT3D-2 in January 1933.

XT3D-1
Prototype powered by a Pratt & Whitney R-1690 radial, one built.
XT3D-2
Prototype modified including a change to a Pratt & Whitney R-1830 radial.

== Operators ==
United States

- United States Navy

== Specifications ==
Data from

General characteristics

- Crew: 3 (pilot, bomb-aimer/gunner, gunner)
- Length: 35 ft 5 in (10.80 m)
- Wingspan: 50 ft 0 in (15.24 m)
- Height: 13 ft 2.5 in (4.026 m)
- Wing area: 624 sq ft (58.0 m^{2})
- Empty weight: 4,238 lb (1,922 kg)
- Max takeoff weight: 7,857 lb (3,564 kg)
- Powerplant: 1 × Pratt & Whitney R-1690 Hornet radial piston engine, 575 hp (429 kW)

Performance

- Maximum speed: 128 mph (206 km/h, 111 kn) at 6000ft (1830m)
- Range: 555 mi (893 km, 482 nmi)
- Service ceiling: 14,000 ft (4,300 m)

Armament

- Guns: 2 × 0.3in (7.62mm) machine-gun (flexible mounted on forward and rear cockpits)
- Bombs: 1835lb (832kg) torpedo or equivalent in bombs

== See also ==
Related lists

- List of United States Navy aircraft designations (pre-1962)
