= Naval Aircraft Factory XOSN =

XOSN-1
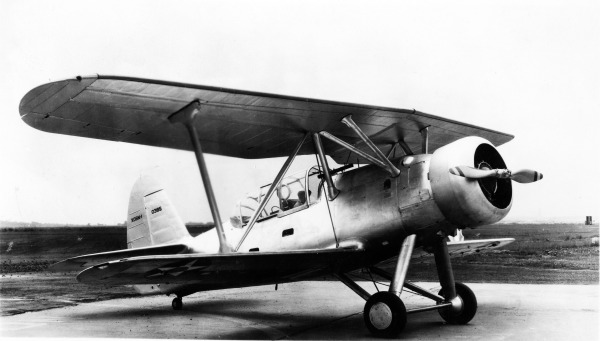

General information
- Type: Observation floatplane
- Manufacturer: Naval Aircraft Factory
- Primary user: United States Navy
- Number built: 1

History
- First flight: May 1938

The Naval Aircraft Factory XOSN was an American biplane observation floatplane developed by the Naval Aircraft Factory for the United States Navy during the late 1930s.

== Design and development ==
In 1936, the Navy asked all interested aircraft manufacturers to submit bids for a new observation-scout aircraft, capable of operating from either water or land, but primarily intended for service on battleships and cruisers for gunnery spotting.

Three companies – Stearman Aircraft, Vought and the Naval Aircraft Factory - submitted aircraft to meet the requirements. The Naval Aircraft Factory design, assigned the designation XOSN-1, was a two-seat biplane of mixed metal and fabric construction, with the pilot and observer seated in tandem in a fully enclosed cockpit. Innovations included automatic leading-edge slats on the upper wing and an I-strut bracing system that eliminated the need for interplane bracing wires. Provisions were made for either float or wheeled landing gear of a conventional taildragger type.

== Operational history ==
The XOSN-1 was delivered for official trials in May 1938 and evaluated along with the other entrants. After Vought's monoplane XOS2U-1 was selected for production, the XOSN-1 was assigned to the Naval Academy at Annapolis where it was used as a trainer until mid-1944.

== Operators ==
United States

- United States Navy

== Specifications (XOSN-1) ==
Data from

General characteristics

- Crew: 2 (pilot and observer)
- Length: 34 ft (10 m)
- Wingspan: 36 ft (11 m)
- Height: 13 ft (4.0 m)
- Wing area: 376 sq ft (34.9 m^{2})
- Empty weight: 3,771 lb (1,710 kg)
- Gross weight: 5,516 lb (2,502 kg)
- Powerplant: 1 × Pratt & Whitney R-1340 radial engine, 550 hp (410 kW)

Performance

- Maximum speed: 160 mph (260 km/h, 140 kn) at 6,000 feet (1,800 m)
- Range: 925 mi (1,489 km, 804 nmi)
- Service ceiling: 14,900 ft (4,500 m)

Armament

- Guns: 1× fixed, forward firing .30 in machine gun; 1× flexibly mounted .30 in machine gun in the rear cockpit

== See also ==
Aircraft of comparable role, configuration, and era

- Beriev Be-2
- Berliner-Joyce OJ
- Curtiss SOC Seagull
- Fairey Seafox
- Mitsubishi F1M
- Stearman XOSS
- Vought O5U

Related lists

- List of United States Navy aircraft designations (pre-1962)
- List of flying boats and floatplanes
