= Stearman XOSS =

XOSS-1
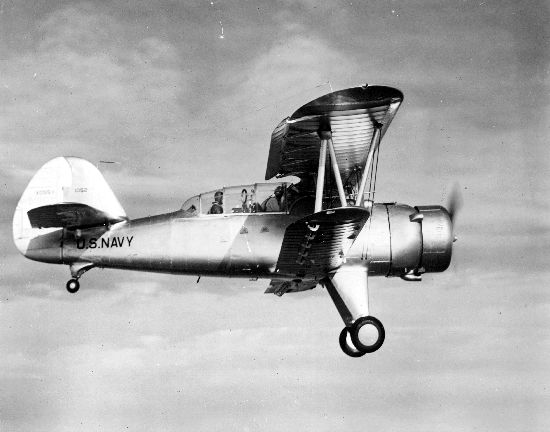

General information
- Type: Observation floatplane
- Manufacturer: Stearman Aircraft
- Primary user: United States Navy
- Number built: 1
- Construction number: 85000
- Serial: 1052

History
- First flight: September 1938
- Retired: July 1941

The Stearman XOSS was an American biplane observation floatplane developed by Stearman Aircraft for the United States Navy during the late 1930s. Intended to replace the Curtiss SOC Seagull in service aboard battleships, it proved inferior to the Vought OS2U Kingfisher in a fly-off, and did not enter production.

== Design and development ==
Known by the company designation Model X-85, the Stearman XOSS-1 was designed during 1937 in response to a U.S. Navy specification calling for an observation-scout type aircraft, capable of operating from either water or land, and stressed for catapult launching from battleships and cruisers. The new aircraft was intended to replace the Curtiss SOC as the standard observation and gunnery spotting aircraft in service aboard the Navy's battleships.

In response to the request for proposals, the Navy received designs from Stearman Aircraft, Chance Vought, and the Naval Aircraft Factory. The Stearman Model 85, given the designation XOSS-1, was a conventional two-seat biplane, with the pilot and observer seated in tandem in a fully enclosed cockpit. The aircraft could be operated with either float or wheeled landing gear, with the former being of the single center-float type, and the latter being a conventional taildragger undercarriage. The XOSS-1 had the unusual feature of being fitted with full-span flaps on the upper wing to reduce stalling speed. It was powered by a Pratt & Whitney R-1340 Wasp radial engine.

== Operational history ==
Flying for the first time in September 1938, the XOSS-1 proved to have benign flying characteristics, and over the next several months was evaluated against the Naval Aircraft Factory XOSN, another conventional biplane, and the Vought XOS2U, a mid-wing monoplane.

The evaluation proved that the XOSS-1 was conventional in all respects; the full-span upper-wing flap reduced the aircraft's landing speed to 57 miles per hour (92 km/h), while the top speed achievable was 162 miles per hour (261 km/h). Both the XOSS-1 and the XOSN-1, despite not possessing any significant faults, were considered to be insufficiently advanced, being inferior in performance and potential to the Vought machine. The XOS2U-1 was declared the winner of the competition in May 1939, and the XOSS-1's development came to an end. The aircraft was used for liaison purposes by the Navy, being scrapped at NAS Jacksonville in 1941.

== Operators ==
United States

- United States Navy

== Specifications (XOSS-1) ==
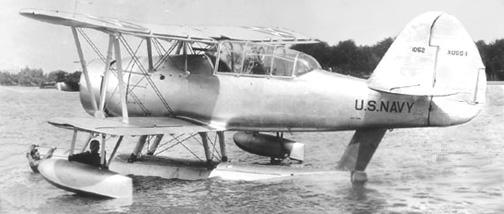
XOSS-1 on floats

Data from

General characteristics

- Crew: 2 (pilot and observer)
- Length: 34 ft 6 in (10.52 m) on floats
- Wingspan: 36 ft (11 m)
- Height: 13 ft (4.0 m)
- Airfoil: NACA 23012
- Gross weight: 4,791 lb (2,173 kg)
- Powerplant: 1 × Pratt & Whitney R-1340 radial engine, 600 hp (450 kW)

Performance

- Maximum speed: 162 mph (261 km/h, 141 kn) at 6,000 feet (1,800 m)
- Range: 832 mi (1,339 km, 723 nmi)
- Service ceiling: 18,500 ft (5,600 m)

== See also ==
Aircraft of comparable role, configuration, and era

- Mitsubishi F1M
- IMAM Ro.43
- Curtiss SOC Seagull
- Vought OS2U Kingfisher

Related lists

- List of United States Navy aircraft designations (pre-1962)
- List of flying boats and floatplanes
