= Bellanca SE =

SE
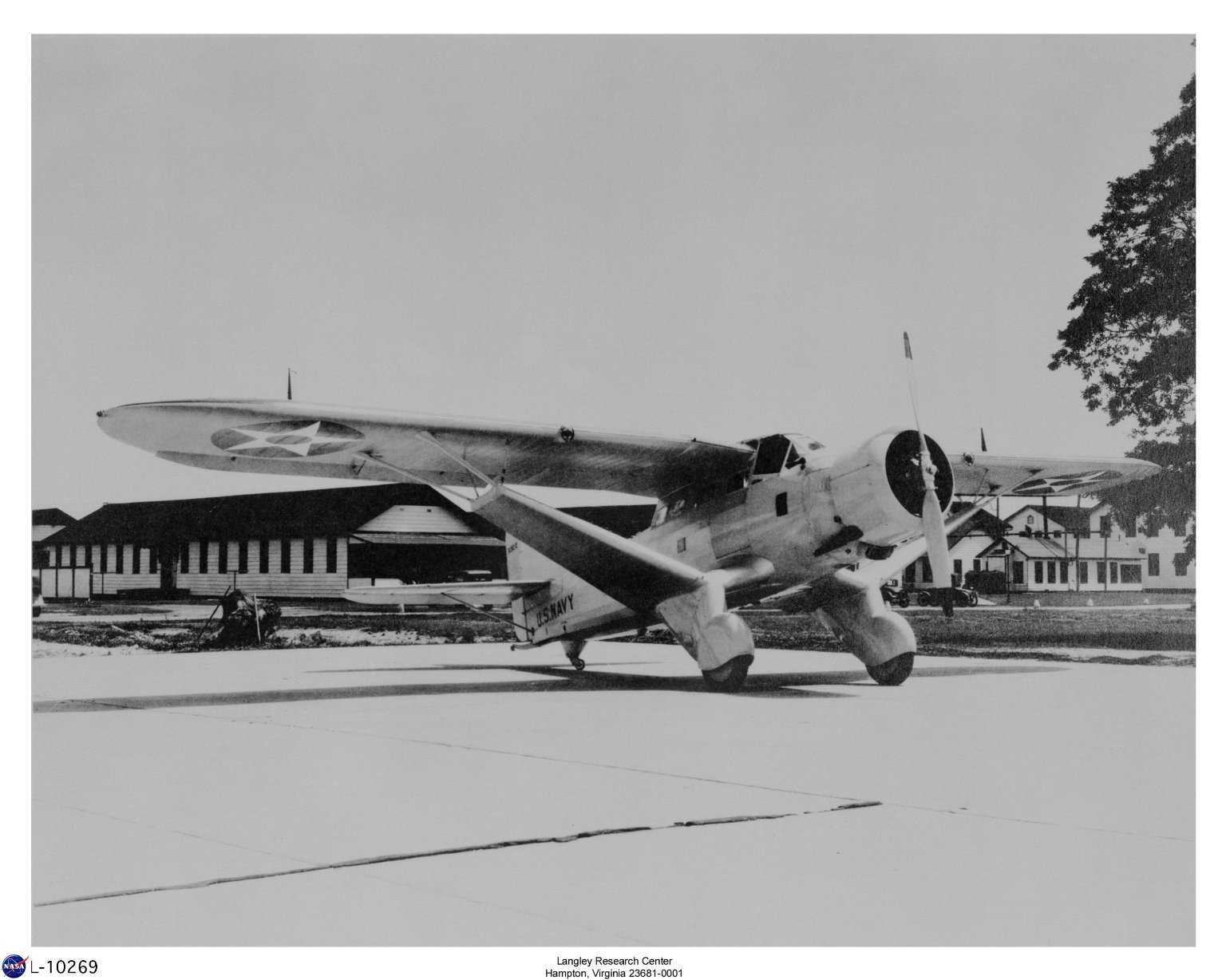
- Bellanca XSE-2

General information
- Type: Carrier-based scout monoplane
- National origin: United States
- Manufacturer: Bellanca
- Number built: 2

History
- First flight: 1932

The Bellanca SE was an American carrier-based scout monoplane designed and built for the United States Navy by the Bellanca Aircraft Company.

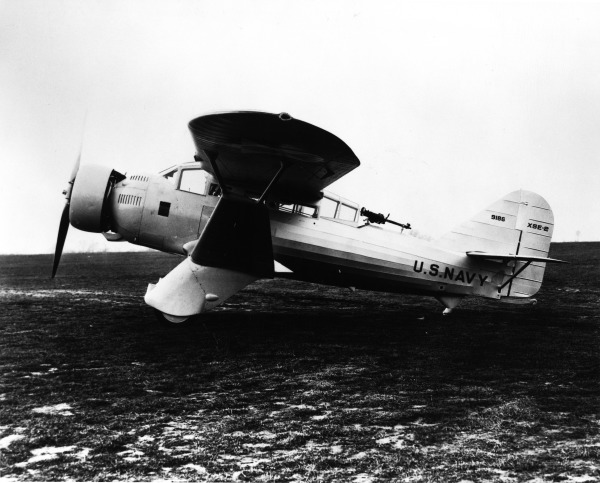
Side view of the XSE-2

== Variants ==
XSE-1
The XSE-1, of 1932, was a two-seat high-wing cabin monoplane with folding wings, powered by a 650 hp (480 kW) Wright R-1820F radial engine. It was not ordered into production and only one prototype (A-9186) was built, which crashed before delivery.
XSE-2
The XSE-1 was re-designed with stronger structure, larger fin and powered by a Wright R-1510 14-cylinder 2-row radial engine. It re-used the serial number of the destroyed XSE-1.

== Specifications ==
Data from aerofiles.com

General characteristics

- Crew: two
- Length: 29 ft 11 in (9.12 m)
- Wingspan: 49 ft 9 in (15.16 m)
- Powerplant: 1 × Wright R-1820F radial engine, 650 hp (480 kW)

Performance

- Maximum speed: 172 mph (277 km/h, 149 kn)
- Service ceiling: 21,200 ft (6,500 m)

== See also ==
Related lists

- List of United States Navy aircraft designations (pre-1962)
