= Vought XS2U =

XS2U

General information
- Type: Anti-submarine warfare aircraft
- National origin: United States
- Manufacturer: Chance Vought Aircraft
- Status: Canceled project
- Number built: 0

The Vought XS2U was a design for an all-weather, carrier-based anti-submarine warfare (ASW) aircraft. A twin-engine, twin-tailed, mid-wing, propeller-driven design with tricycle landing gear, it lost to the Grumman S2F Tracker in the United States Navy competition, and the two prototypes were not completed.

== Design and development ==
Chance Vought Aircraft began work on 25 January 1950 on a U.S. Navy proposal for an all-weather anti-submarine warfare design. The company constructed a full-scale mock-up of the XS2U-1 and received a contract-of-intent for two XS2U-1 prototypes, BuNos 133780 and 133781, which were not completed before development was abandoned.

Three-blade propellers similar to those used on the S2F were installed on the mock-up, which had a two-wheel nosegear, and single-tire main gear that would retract into the engine nacelles. The twin-tail fins were canted inward, 90 degrees from the tailplane dihedral.

Construction was begun on the fuselages and wings, but technical difficulties arose over how to fold the wings for carrier stowage. A complicated double-fold of each wing outboard of the radial engine was required. The contract was canceled and neither airframe was completed, the Navy electing to acquire the S2F Tracker instead.

The S2U was also proposed for the carrier-borne AEW role as the S2U-1W, later changed to WU-1. A bulged radome was astride the center fuselage, and the forward fuselage/cockpit design bore a passing resemblance to the later Grumman Mohawk.

== Variants ==
XS2U-1
Designation for the two prototype aircraft ordered but not completed.
S2U-1
Proposed anti-submarine warfare version, as originally proposed.
S2U-1W
Proposed Airborne Early Warning version of the S2U-1 with large radome over the centre section, similar to the Grumman WF which was purchased by the US Navy for the carrier-borne AEW role.
WU-1
The S2U-1W re-designated into the W-Warning category.

== See also ==
Aircraft of comparable role, configuration, and era

- Grumman S2F Tracker
- Grumman WF Tracer
