= Curtiss R2C =

American racing aircraft

Model 32, R2C, R-8
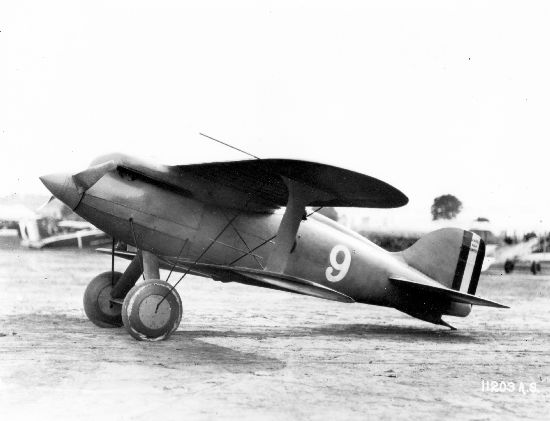

General information
- Type: Racing aircraft
- Manufacturer: Curtiss Aeroplane and Motor Company
- Primary users: United States Navy United States Army
- Number built: 3

History
- First flight: 9 September 1923

The Curtiss R2C was a racing aircraft designed for the United States Navy in 1923 by Curtiss. It was a single-seater biplane with a monocoque fuselage and staggered single-bay wings of unequal span braced with I-struts. The aircraft's advanced streamlining featured a top wing mounted directly to the top of the fuselage and surface-mounted radiators for cooling the engine. The aircraft was originally designed and built as a landplane under the Navy designation R2C-1, of which two examples were produced. One was converted into a seaplane version known as the R2C-2 the following year.

== Operational history ==
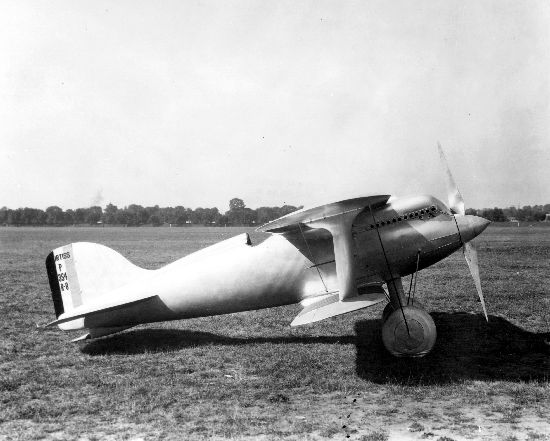
US Army Curtiss R-8 racer

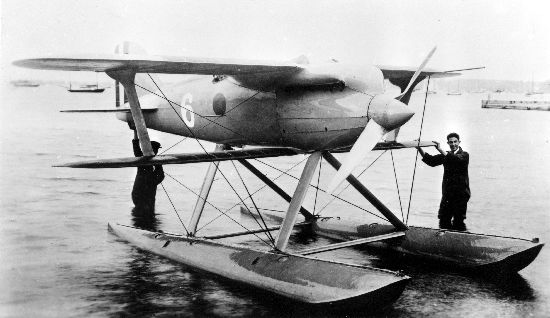
Curtiss R2C-2 floatplane

The R2C-1s were entered in the 1923 Pulitzer Trophy race, and took first and second places piloted by Lt jg Al Williams and Lt Harold Brow at average speeds of 243.67 and 241.78 mph (392.15 and 389.11 km/h). Later in the year, Brow took one of the R2C-1s to 259.16 mph (417.08 km/h) and set a new world airspeed record. On 4 November 1923, Lieutenant Alford J. Williams, Jr., U.S. Navy, set a Fédération Aéronautique Internationale (FAI) World Record for Speed Over a 3-Kilometer Course of 429.03 kilometers per hour (266.59 miles per hour). (FAI Record File Number 8753) The second aircraft was sold shortly thereafter to the US Army for the token sum of $1. The Army designated it the R-8 and intended to race the aircraft against the Navy in the 1924 Pulitzer Trophy Race in Fairfield, Ohio, but it was destroyed in a crash during training shortly before the competition killing the pilot, First Lieutenant Alexander Pearson, Jr.

The remaining R2C had its wheeled undercarriage replaced by pontoons during 1924 in preparation for that year's Schneider Trophy race, but the event was cancelled due to a lack of competitors. As it was, the aircraft won that year's Pulitzer Trophy in the seaplane class with an average speed of 227.5 mph (366.1 km/h). The aircraft ended its days training pilots for the 1925 and 1926 Schneider Trophy races.

== Variants ==
R2C-1
Landplane racer, two built (A6691 and A6692).
R2C-2
Floatplane racer, one converted from A6692.

== Operators ==
United States

- United States Navy
- United States Army

== Specifications (R2C-1) ==
Data from Curtiss Aircraft 1907–1947, United States Navy aircraft since 1911

General characteristics

- Crew: 1
- Length: 19 ft 8.5 in (6.007 m)
- Wingspan: 22 ft 0 in (6.71 m)
- Height: 6 ft 10 in (2.08 m)
- Wing area: 148 sq ft (13.7 m^{2})
- Airfoil: Curtiss C-62
- Empty weight: 1,877 lb (851 kg)
- Gross weight: 2,071 lb (939 kg)
- Powerplant: 1 × Curtiss D-12A V-12 water-cooled piston engine, 507 hp (378 kW)
- Propellers: 2-bladed Curtiss-Reed

Performance

- Maximum speed: 266 mph (428 km/h, 231 kn) at sea level
- Range: 173 mi (278 km, 150 nmi) at full throttle

430 mi (370 nmi; 690 km) cruising

- Service ceiling: 31,800 ft (9,700 m)
- Time to altitude: 10,000 ft (3,000 m) in 3 minutes 36 seconds

== See also ==
Related development

- Curtiss R3C

Related lists

- List of racing aircraft
