= Convair XP6Y =

P6Y
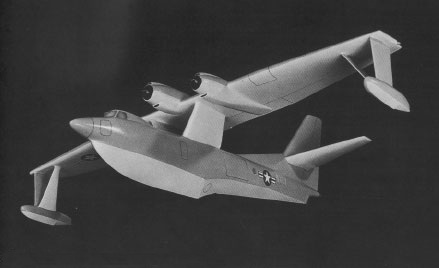

General information
- Type: ASW flying boat
- Manufacturer: Convair
- Primary user: U.S. Navy
- Number built: 0

The Convair P6Y was an unbuilt aircraft designed by Convair in the 1950s. The design was initiated to meet a requirement of the United States Navy (USN) for an anti-submarine warfare seaplane.

== History ==
The design was for a flying boat that would make use of boundary layer control to achieve slow speed flight. It was intended that this would enable the aircraft to land on the open ocean in rough seas and deploy a dipping sonar. Other visual features of the design were an extremely large swept vertical fin that, combined with the dorsal fin and rudder, would have been about half the total length of the aircraft, and a thimble nose radome.

Two prototypes were ordered under the USN designation XP6Y-1 with the BuNos. (Navy serial numbers) 147206 and 147207. The design had competition from the Martin P7M SubMaster, but the USN's preference was for the P6Y. Both types suffered from budget constraints and neither was built (although a mock-up of the P7M was constructed); the USN cancelled the contract for the two prototype XP6Y-1s and later opted for the land-based P-3 Orion instead.

== Specifications (projected) ==
General characteristics

- Length: 121 ft (37 m)
- Wingspan: 127 ft 6 in (38.86 m)
- Height: 39 ft (12 m)
- Wing area: 2,500 sq ft (230 m^{2})
- Empty weight: 60,789 lb (27,573 kg)
- Gross weight: 94,360 lb (42,801 kg)
- Powerplant: 3 × Wright R-3350-32 radial piston engines, 3,700 hp (2,800 kW) each
- Powerplant: 2 × General Electric YJ85-GE-1 turbojets, 2,100 lbf (9.3 kN) thrust each in rear of centre nacelle

Performance

- Maximum speed: 400 mph (650 km/h, 350 kn)
- Range: 1,400 mi (2,200 km, 1,200 nmi)
- Service ceiling: 25,300 ft (7,700 m) service ceiling

Armament
Missiles, bombs, and depth charges on external hardpoints

== See also ==
Aircraft of comparable role, configuration, and era

- Beriev Be-6
- Martin P5M Marlin

Related lists

- List of United States Navy aircraft designations (pre-1962)
- List of flying boats and floatplanes
