= KAN Little Joe =

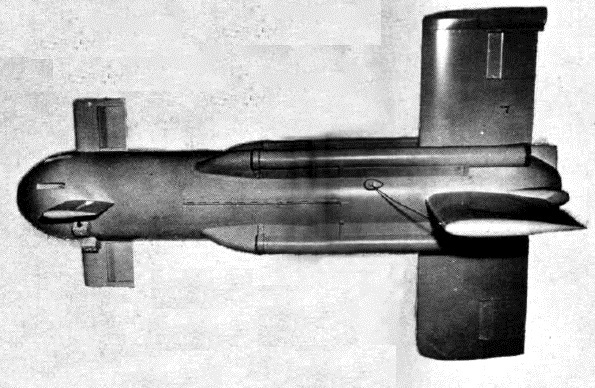
- Type: Surface-to-air missile
- Place of origin: United States

Service history
- Used by: United States Navy

Production history
- Designed: 1945
- Manufacturer: Naval Air Material Unit
- Produced: 1945-1946
- No. built: 15

Specifications (KAN-1)
- Mass: 1,210 pounds (550 kg)
- Length: 11 feet 4 inches (3.45 m)
- Diameter: 22.7 inches (57.7 cm)
- Wingspan: 7 ft 7 in (2.31 m)
- Warhead: High explosive
- Warhead weight: 100 pounds (45 kg)
- Detonation mechanism: Proximity fuze
- Engine: Booster, 4x 3 in (76 mm) rockets 990 lb_{f} (4.4 kN) each Sustainer, Aerojet 8AS1000; 990 lb_{f} (4.4 kN)
- Operational range: 2.5 miles (4.0 km)
- Flight ceiling: 7,900 feet (2,400 m)
- Maximum speed: 400 miles per hour (640 km/h)
- Guidance system: Radio command

The Little Joe, also known by the United States Navy designation KAN, was an early American ship-based, short-range surface-to-air missile, the development of which was initiated in 1945 as a response to the Kamikaze tactics used by the Japanese. Although the missile was successfully tested, the end of World War II removed the requirement for the missile, and the project was abandoned in 1946.

== Design and development ==
The development of the Little Joe rocket began in 1945, as the United States Navy sought an effective point defense against Japanese Kamikaze aircraft. The definitive surface-to-air missile project, Lark, was expected to take some time to come to fruition, so a simpler missile, based on existing parts, was proposed by the Naval Air Material Unit.

Named "Little Joe", and designated KAN-1, the missile was the first SAM developed and tested by the United States. The Little Joe's fuselage was essentially the same as the standard Aerojet Jet-Assisted Take-Off (JATO) rocket, ordinarily used to provide additional takeoff thrust for heavily loaded aircraft. Cruciform wings and canard control surfaces were fitted to the missile; guidance was provided by a radio command-to-line-of-sight system. Four auxiliary rockets were mounted as boosters to provide for the rapid launch response needed to deal with Kamikaze aircraft.

The warhead used was a standard 100 pounds (45 kg) general-purpose aerial bomb. A proximity fuse would cause the warhead to detonate within lethal distance of the target; the heavy warhead was expected to ensure the destruction of the attacking aircraft.

== Operational history ==
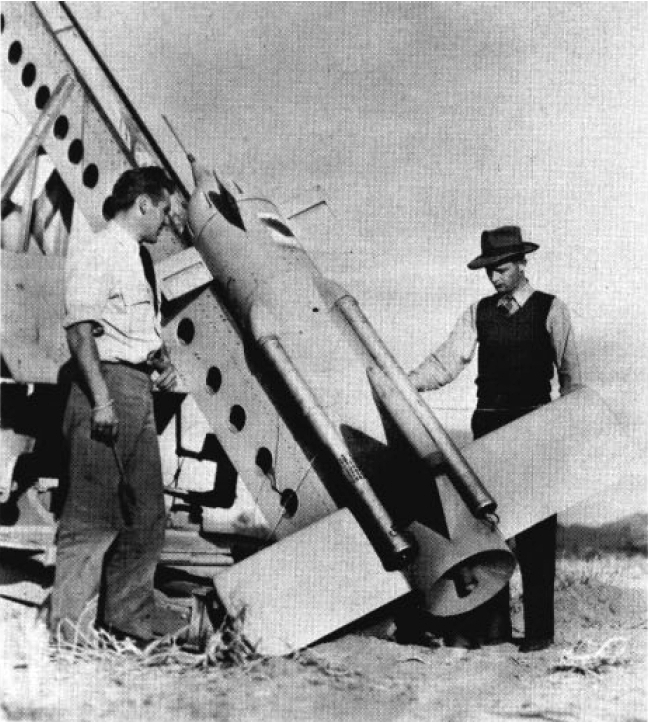
A KAN-1 missile at Point Mugu.

Initial tests of Little Joe took place in July 1945. Testing showed that the missile's performance was less than had been anticipated. In addition, smoke from the boosters and the sustainer made it difficult for the missile's controller to keep track of the weapon.

In an attempt to deal with the missile's issues, an improved version of Little Joe, designated KAN-2, was developed. This used a new, less smokey propellant for the sustainer; in addition, flares were installed on the missile's tail to assist in visual tracking, while two additional boosters, for a total of six, were added to boost performance.

A total of 15 Little Joe missiles were built and flown during the test program. With the end of World War II having removed the immediate requirement for the missile, in addition to the test program continuing to be problematic, the Little Joe program was canceled during 1946.
