= General Aviation XFA =

American fighter prototype

XFA
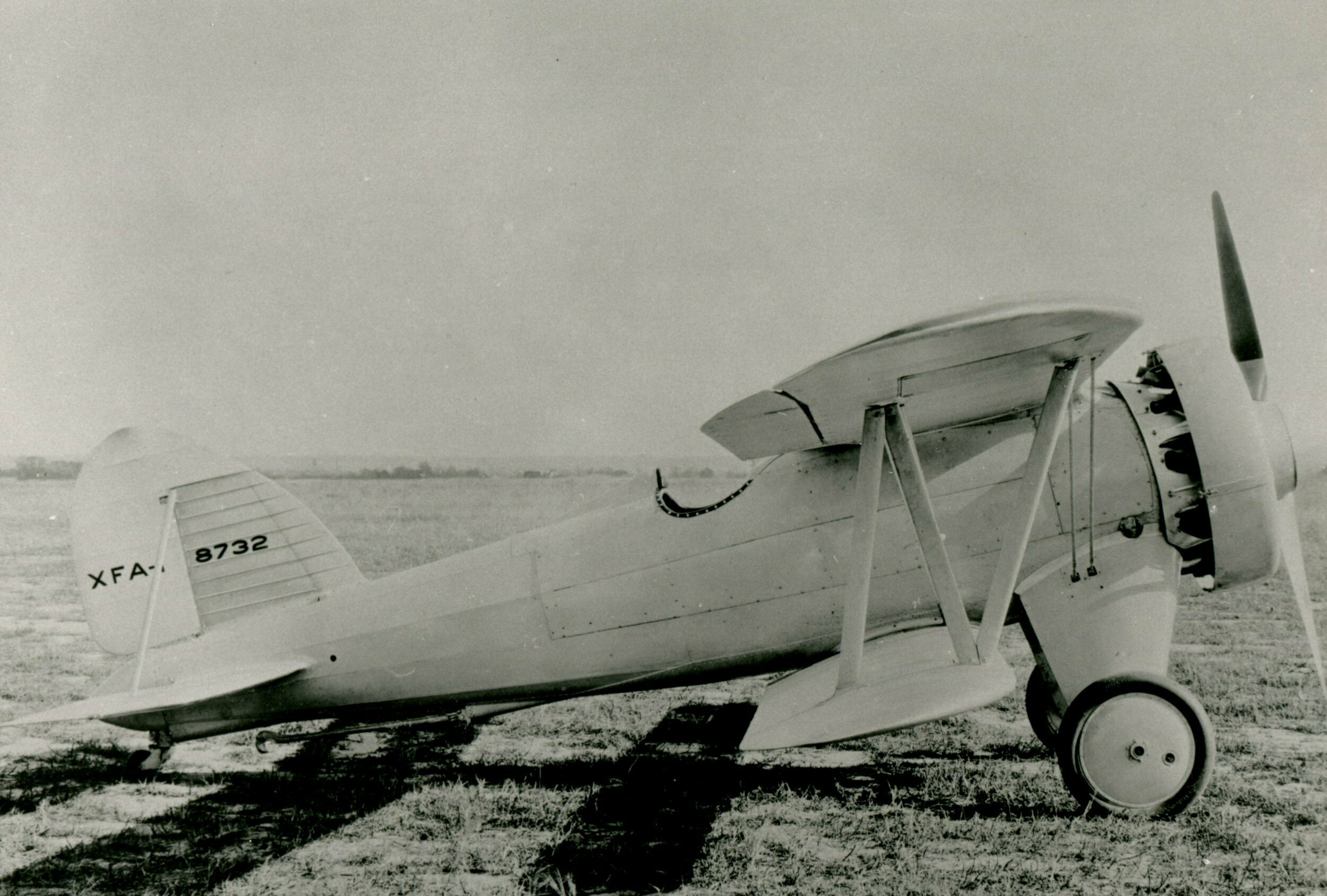

General information
- Type: Fighter
- National origin: United States
- Manufacturer: General Aviation Company
- Number built: 1

History
- First flight: 1932

The General Aviation XFA was an American biplane fighter aircraft built by the General Aviation Company for the United States Navy.

== Development ==
The PW-4 was built for U.S. Navy Specification No. 96, calling for a carrier-based light fighter. This specification was eventually revealed as a cover for the Navy's actual desire for an airship fighter, the Curtiss XF9C. The XFA was a single-bay biplane with an all-metal fuselage and metal laminate skin. The construction of its fuselage was innovative in that instead of using lap jointing, the edges of each panel were bent inwards, with the rivets fastening them on the inside, instead of being visible on the surface. It had a gull-type upper wing which was fabric covered. The prototype was ordered in 1930, but the company was engaged in another reorganization, which delayed its work. Delivered for evaluations in 1932, it showed poor flying characteristics, including longitudinal instability and over-sensitive controls. General Aircraft increased the area of the tail surfaces and made other changes, then returned the prototype for more testing; but now the stability problems were worse. The plane would nose up with more throttle, but then drop its nose when the throttle was reduced. After another round of modifications, and some close calls, the plane was finally classed as unsafe and testing was abandoned.

== Specifications ==
Data from Angelucci, 1987. pp. 203-204.

General characteristics

- Crew: 1
- Length: 22 ft 2 in (6.75 m)
- Wingspan: 25 ft 6 in (7.77 m)
- Height: 9 ft 3 in (2.81 m)
- Wing area: 175 sq ft (16.25 m^{2})
- Empty weight: 1,837 lb (833 kg)
- Gross weight: 2,508 lb (1,138 kg)
- Powerplant: 1 × Pratt & Whitney R-1340-C , 450 hp (340 kW)

Performance

- Maximum speed: 170 mph (274 km/h, 150 kn)
- Range: 518 mi (834 km, 450 nmi)
- Service ceiling: 20,200 ft (6,157 m)
- Rate of climb: 1,470 ft/min (7.47 m/s)

Armament

- 2 × .30 in (7.62 mm) machine guns
