= Martin P7M SubMaster =

Unbuilt aircraft designed in the 1950s

P7M

General information
- Type: anti-submarine warfare (ASW) flying boat
- Manufacturer: Glenn L. Martin Company
- Primary user: United States Navy
- Number built: 0 (mock-up only)

History
- Developed from: P5M Marlin

The Martin P7M was an unbuilt aircraft designed by the Glenn L. Martin Company in the 1950s. The design was initiated to meet a requirement of the United States Navy for an anti-submarine warfare flying boat.

== Design and development ==
The design was for a flying boat that would make use of boundary layer control (BLC) to achieve slow speed flight. It was intended that this would enable the aircraft to land on the open ocean in rough seas and deploy a dipping sonar. Martin proposed a variant of the P5M Marlin, the P5M-3, to take advantage of this phenomenon.

Martin continued development of the P5M-3 under the designation P7M Submaster, introducing two General Electric J85 BLC gas generators, one in the rear of each outer engine nacelle. A mock-up was built, but the P7M, Convair XP6Y and Grumman G-132 were all cancelled when the U.S. Navy abandoned its open-ocean seaplane requirement.

== Specifications (P7M projected) ==
General characteristics

- Length: 136 ft (41 m)
- Wingspan: 111 ft 7 in (34.01 m)
- Height: 39 ft (12 m)
- Wing area: 2,500 sq ft (230 m^{2})
- Powerplant: 4 × Wright R-1820-42 radial piston engines, 1,525 hp (1,137 kW) each
- Powerplant: 2 × General Electric YJ85-GE-1 turbojet gas generators for BLC in rear of outer nacelles

Performance

- Maximum speed: 400 mph (650 km/h, 350 kn)
- Range: 1,400 mi (2,200 km, 1,200 nmi)
- Service ceiling: 25,300 ft (7,700 m) service ceiling

Armament

- Missiles, bombs, and depth charges on external hard-points
