= Burgess Model K =

Early US Military Aircraft

The Burgess Model K was a two-seat pusher type "flying boat" built for the U.S. Navy by Burgess in 1913.

== Design ==
The aircraft was built to meet navy requirements as a two-seat, tandem, staggered-wing biplane flying boat. The primary construction was made of wood, with a spruce and oak framework overlaid by fabric and mahogany. The hull was made of two detachable sections connected by steel fittings.

Of particular note was the design of the wings. The lower plane was of traditional biplane style using two spars, but the upper section was of "monoplane" style and used only one spar. The upper wing was used to provide lateral stability through wing-warping, while the lower wing remained rigid. The entire wing structure was designed to be foldable and detachable.

The aircraft was equipped with a variety of indicators, including a compass, altimeter, inclinometer, airspeed indicator and chart boards. The native Wright control scheme would later be replaced.

Pitch and yaw control were provided through a conventional empennage. The rudder provided control both in the sky and on the water.

== Operational history ==
The design was ordered in March or February 1913 and one was built. It was tested at the Burgess facility in Marblehead in April, and delivered and accepted by the Navy on May 17, designated D-1.

The aircraft was shipped with the patented Wright control scheme. However, it would be used as a testbed for various aircraft control systems that were under review by the Navy department at that time, including those used on Nieuport and Deperdussin.

In February 1914, the aircraft stalled at an altitude of 200' and crashed at the Naval Air Station in Pensacola, Florida. Its pilot, Ltjg. James M. Murray, drowned in the accident.

In December 1914, ten months after the aircraft was destroyed in the crash, it was officially redesignated as AB-6.

== Specifications ==
General characteristics

- Crew: One pilot
- Capacity: one passenger
- Length: 31' (9.45m)
- Wingspan: 43' (13.1m) (Upper Wing), 36' (10.97m) (Lower Wing)
- Wing Area: 397 sq. ft (37 sq. m)
- Height: 8' 10"
- Powerplant:1 × Renault 8 cyl Air-Cooled, 70 hp

Performance

- Maximum speed: 62 mph (100 km/h, 54 kn)
- Gross Takeoff Weight: 2,100lbs (952kg)
