= Boeing XPB =

1920s American flying boat airplanes

XPB
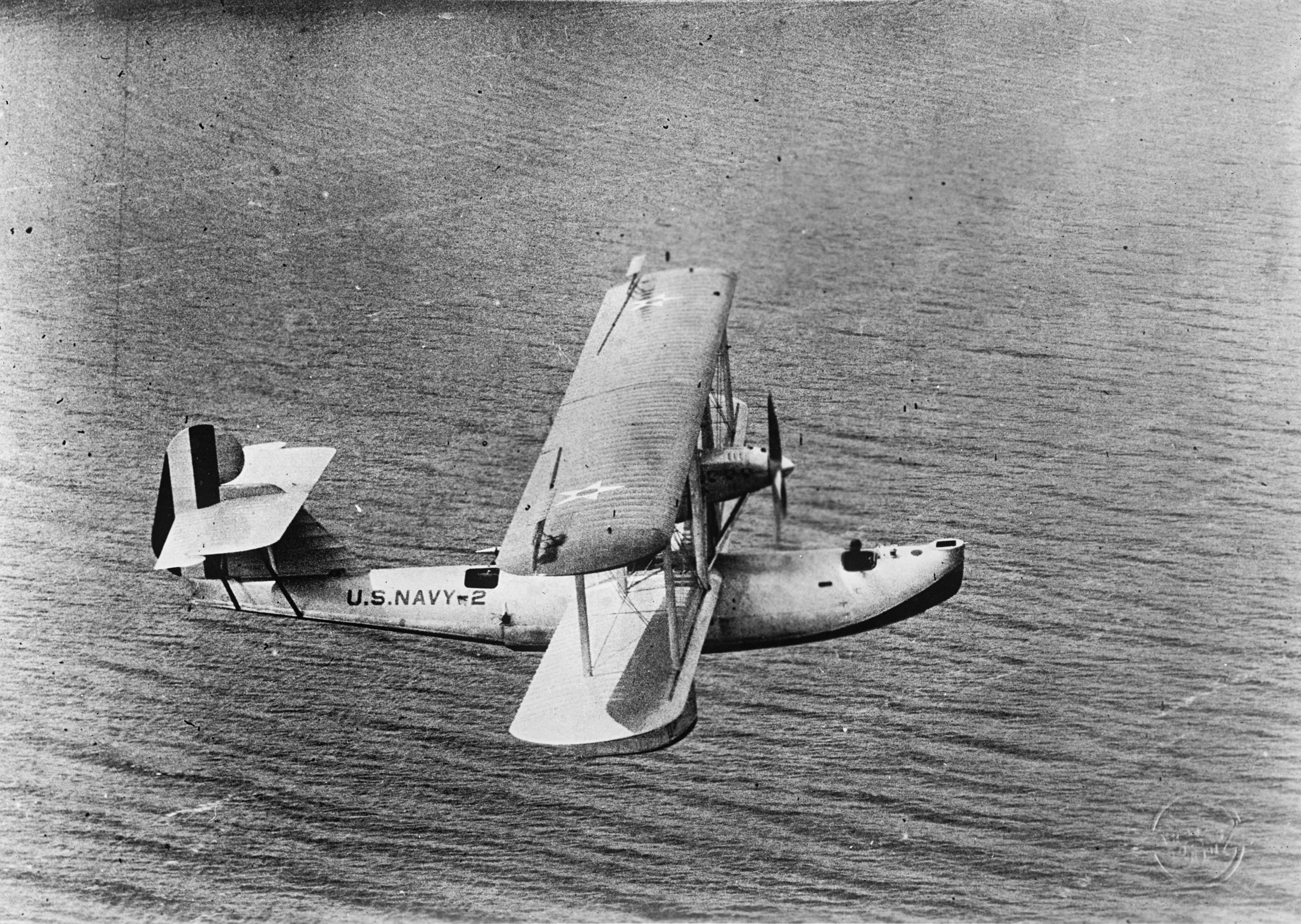

General information
- Type: Patrol flying boat
- National origin: United States
- Manufacturer: Boeing
- Primary user: United States Navy
- Number built: 1

History
- First flight: 1925

The Boeing XPB (company Model 50) was an American twin-engined biplane long-range patrol flying boat of the 1920s. A single example was built for the United States Navy.

== Design and development ==
In September 1924, the Naval Aircraft Factory was tasked with designing a long-range twin-engined flying boat, capable of flying the 2,400 mi (3,860 km) between San Francisco and Hawaii. The initial design was carried out by Isaac M. Laddon, an employee of Consolidated Aircraft, and then passed to Boeing for detailed design and construction. The new flying boat, the Boeing Model 50, was a two-bay biplane of very streamlined design for flying boats of the time. The wings were of metal construction, with wooden wingtips and leading edges. The fuselage had a metal lower part, with the upper half made of laminated wooden frames with a wood veneer covering. Two 800 hp (600 kW) Packard 2A-2500 V12 engines driving four-bladed propellers were mounted in tandem between the wings above the fuselage.

== Operational history ==
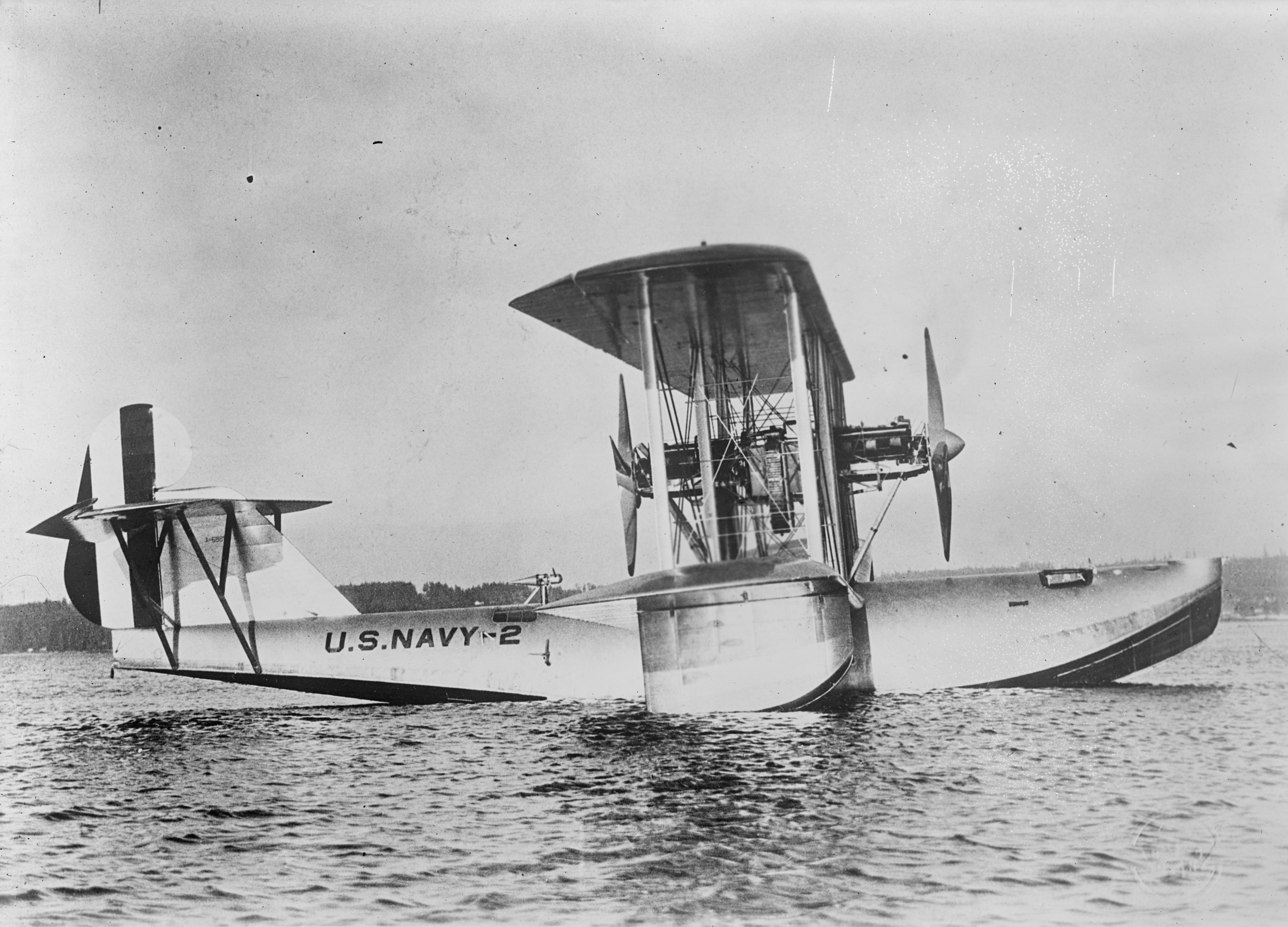
Boeing XPB-1

The Boeing Model 50, designated XPB-1 by the US Navy, made its maiden flight in August 1925. It was intended to use it to lead a pair of Naval Aircraft Factory PN-9s in an attempt to fly to Hawaii on 31 August 1925, but engine trouble led to its participation in the flight being cancelled. In 1928, the aircraft was modified by the Naval Aircraft Factory, its Packard engines were replaced by two 500 hp (370 kW) geared Pratt & Whitney R-1690 Hornet radial engines, leading to the new designation XPB-2.

== Specifications (XPB-1) ==
Data from Boeing Aircraft since 1916

General characteristics

- Crew: 5
- Length: 59 ft 4.5 in (18.098 m)
- Wingspan: 87 ft 6 in (26.67 m)
- Height: 20 ft 10 in (6.35 m)
- Wing area: 1,801 sq ft (167.3 m^{2})
- Airfoil: Clark Y
- Empty weight: 11,551 lb (5,239 kg)
- Gross weight: 26,882 lb (12,193 kg)
- Powerplant: 2 × Packard 2A-2500 liquid-cooled V12 engine, 800 hp (600 kW) each

Performance

- Maximum speed: 97 kn (112 mph, 180 km/h)
- Cruise speed: 82 kn (94 mph, 151 km/h)
- Range: 2,200 nmi (2,500 mi, 4,000 km)
- Service ceiling: 9,000 ft (2,700 m)
- Rate of climb: 4,000 ft/min (20 m/s)

Armament

- Guns: 3× .30 in machine guns
- Bombs: 4,000 lb (1,800 kg)

== See also ==
Related lists

- List of flying boats and floatplanes
