= KA3N Gorgon III =

Gorgon III
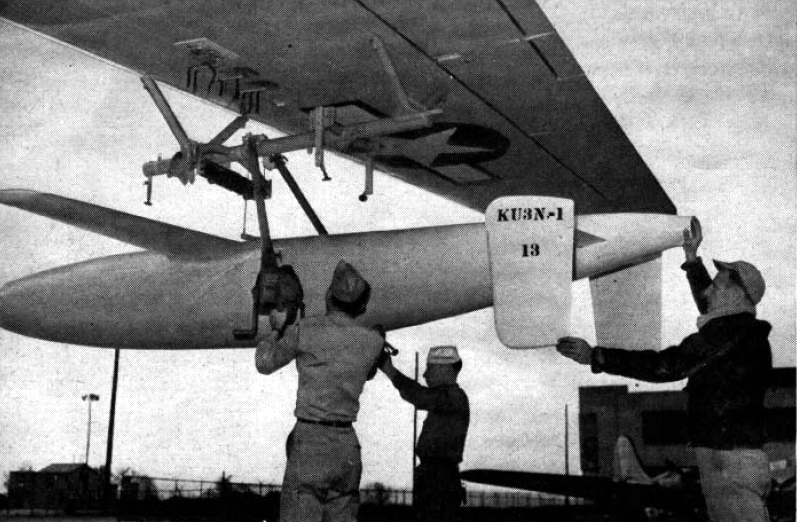
- Gorgon IIIA
- Type: Air-to-air missile
- Place of origin: United States

Service history
- In service: 1946–1948
- Used by: United States Navy

Production history
- Designer: Naval Aircraft Modification Unit
- Designed: 1945
- No. built: 34 Gorgon IIIA, 12 Gorgon IIIC

Specifications (Gorgon IIIA)
- Mass: 1,280 pounds (580 kg)
- Length: 16 feet 2 inches (4.93 m)
- Wingspan: 11 feet (3.4 m)
- Warhead: Fragmentation
- Warhead weight: 257 lb (117 kg)
- Engine: one Reaction Motors CML2N liquid-fuel rocket 350 lbf (1,600 N) thrust for 130 seconds
- Operational range: 12 miles (19 km)
- Maximum speed: 523 mph (842 km/h)
- Guidance system: Television guidance
- References: Parsch 2005

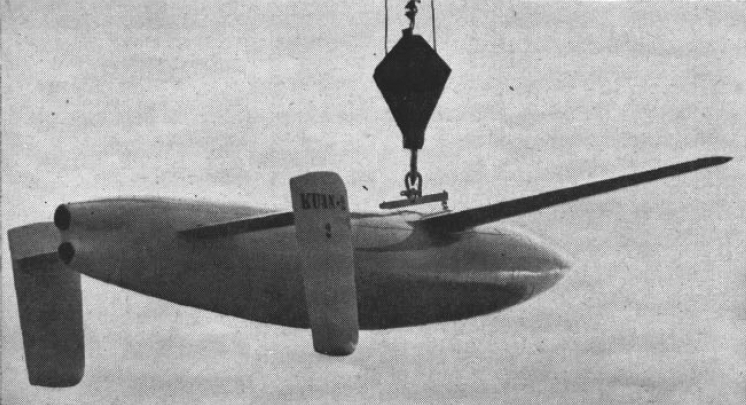
A Gorgon IIIC

The Gorgon III – given the military designations KA3N, KU3N, CTV-N-6 and RTV-N-4 – was a rocket-powered air-to-air missile developed by the United States Navy near the end of World War II. With the end of the war, the program was changed to that of a research vehicle for missile control systems; both single and twin-rocket-powered versions were built and tested.

== Design and development ==
The Gorgon missile program began in July 1943 at the Naval Aircraft Modification Unit in Warminster, Pennsylvania, and was intended to develop a family of small air-launched missiles for air-to-air and air-to-surface roles. The Gorgon III was intended as an air-to-air missile for use by patrol aircraft; it would have a conventional aircraft-type design, with a high-mounted wing and twin tail fins. Originally three different propulsion systems were to be trialed; Gorgon IIIA was to be rocket-powered; Gorgon IIIB powered by a turbojet engine, and Gorgon IIIC was to use pulsejet propulsion; however Gorgon IIIC was later changed to a rocket-powered configuration. Both Gorgon IIIA and, in its as-built configuration, Gorgon IIIC were to be powered by the Reaction Motors CLM2N liquid-fuel rocket, fueled with monoethylamine and nitric acid, with a single motor in the IIIA and twin motors in the Gorgon IIIC. Guidance was to be provided by a combination of television guidance, the missile steered by radio command from the launching aircraft to the target via a camera in the nose of the missile, with a backup seeker head of unspecified type.

In April 1945, orders had been placed for 34 Gorgon IIIA missiles, with 16 Gorgon IIIBs and 20 Gorgon IIICs also on contract. However, the guidance system had proved to be unworkable in tests of the Gorgon IIA missile, and with the end of the war the program was realigned as a pure testing effort for missile control and guidance systems.

== Operational history ==
=== Gorgon IIIA ===
All 34 of the ordered Gorgon IIIAs were built; designated KA3N-1, tests began in late 1945. With the change of the program to research in 1946 the missile was redesignated KU3N-1, with the designation later becoming CTV-6 and then the definitive CTV-N-6. Gorgon IIIA was used to test components and control systems for guided missiles.

=== Gorgon IIIB ===
Due to a lack of suitable turbojet engines for missile usage, the Gorgon IIIB was cancelled before any vehicles had been built. However a derivative, the TD2N target drone, was produced, with nine aircraft being produced and tested.

=== Gorgon IIIC ===
Given the designation KA3N-2, the Gorgon IIIC was limited to a production run of twelve airframes. Redesignated KU3N-2 with the end of the war, six were utilized by the Navy in trials of missile stability, control, and performance; the other six were used by the National Advisory Committee for Aeronautics (NACA) for research into flight conditions at high subsonic speeds, launched from the Pilotless Aircraft Research Station at Wallops Island, Virginia, using a purpose-built 400-foot (120 m) launch ramp. The Gorgon IIIC was redesignated RTV-4, then RTV-N-4, before being retired. Some appear to have been expended as target drones at the end of their life.

== Surviving aircraft ==
The U.S. Navy donated two CTV-N-6 Gorgon IIIAs to the National Air and Space Museum; transferred in 1965 and 1966, they remain unrestored in the museum's storage facilities. The only known survivor of the NACA Gorgon IIIs was transferred to the museum in 1965 and also remains in storage.
