= CTV-N-2 Gorgon IIC =

CTV-N-2 Gorgon IIC KD2N RTV-N-15
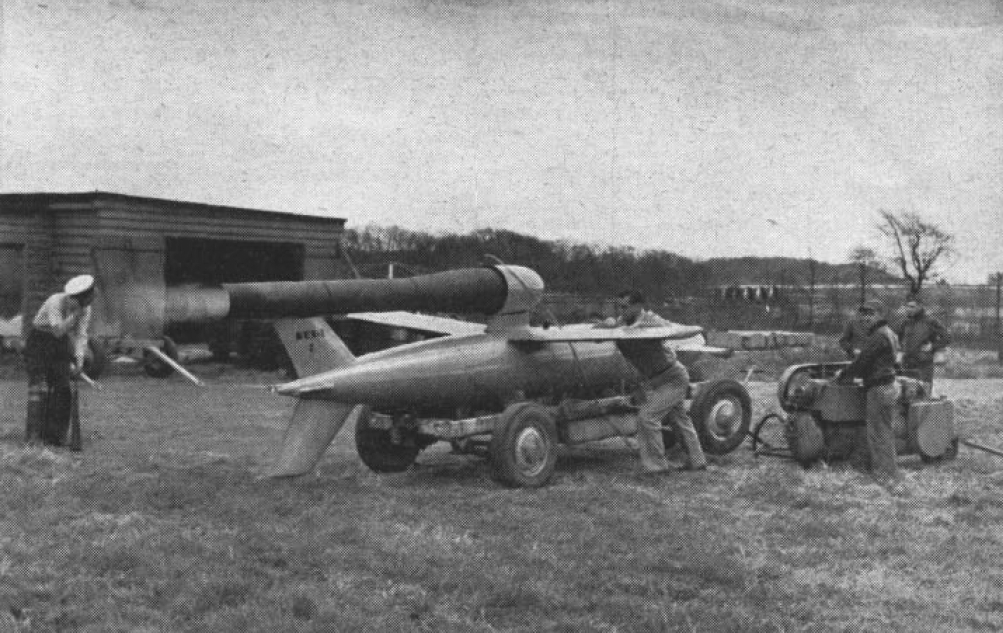
- A KUN-1 (Gorgon IIC) in 1947
- Type: Propulsion test vehicle Target drone Experimental missile
- Place of origin: United States

Service history
- In service: 1947–1951
- Used by: United States Navy

Production history
- Designer: Naval Aircraft Modification Unit
- Designed: 1945
- Manufacturer: Singer Manufacturing Company

Specifications
- Mass: 1,950 pounds (880 kg)
- Length: 19 feet 7 inches (5.97 m)
- Wingspan: 11 feet 6 inches (3.51 m)
- Engine: one Naval Engineering Experiment Station 14" pulsejet 330 lbf (1,500 N) thrust
- Operational range: 80 miles (130 km)
- Maximum speed: 450 mph (720 km/h)
- Guidance system: Active radar homing

The CTV-N-2 Gorgon IIC – also designated KGN, KUN, and CTV-2 – was an experimental drone, originally intended as a surface-to-surface missile, developed by the United States Navy near the end of World War II. It was used to test control and homing systems for guided missiles, and was also produced in small numbers as a target drone under the designations TD3N and KD2N.

== Design and development ==
Late in World War II, the U.S. Navy began development of a pulsejet-powered bombardment missile, intended to be launched from ships for use against targets ashore; in April 1945, plans for the invasion of Japan called for the production of "several hundred" missiles, named Gorgon IIC; initially, 20 prototype missiles were to be produced by the Naval Aircraft Modification Unit in Pennsylvania, while an order for 100 was placed with the Singer Manufacturing Company, a sewing machine manufacturer, in August 1945. The end of the war saw the cancellation of the production plans, however development continued, and in October 1945 the Gorgon IIC received the designation KGN-1.

The Gorgon IIC was very similar in design to the Gorgon IIA air-to-air missile, being of canard configuration with a high-mounted monoplane wing and vertical and ventral stabilizing fins. The pulsejet, developed at the Naval Engineering Experiment Station, was 14 inches (360 mm) in diameter and was mounted above the rear fuselage; launch was from the ground using a catapult or sled with a 900 lbf (4,000 N) rocket booster, or from a carrier aircraft. In its original, bombardment configuration, the Gorgon IIC was intended to use active radar homing, similar to that used on the Bat guided bomb.

== Operational history ==
Testing of the Gorgon IIC began in 1946; late that year it was redesignated KUN-1 to reflect its non-combat role, while in September 1947 it was redesignated CTV-2, and in 1948 received its definitive designation of CTV-N-2. Gorgon IIC was used to test guidance and control devices for guided missile development; in 1950, an active radar guidance system was trialled using a CTV-N-2, successfully homing from a distance of 9 nautical miles (17 km; 10 mi). Trials of the Gorgon IIC were considered generally satisfactory by the Navy.

Eight target drone versions of the Gorgon IIC, originally designated TD3N-1 but, in March 1946, redesignated KD2N-1, were also produced; the KD2N was used in parachute-recovery trials around 1950.

== RTV-N-15 ==
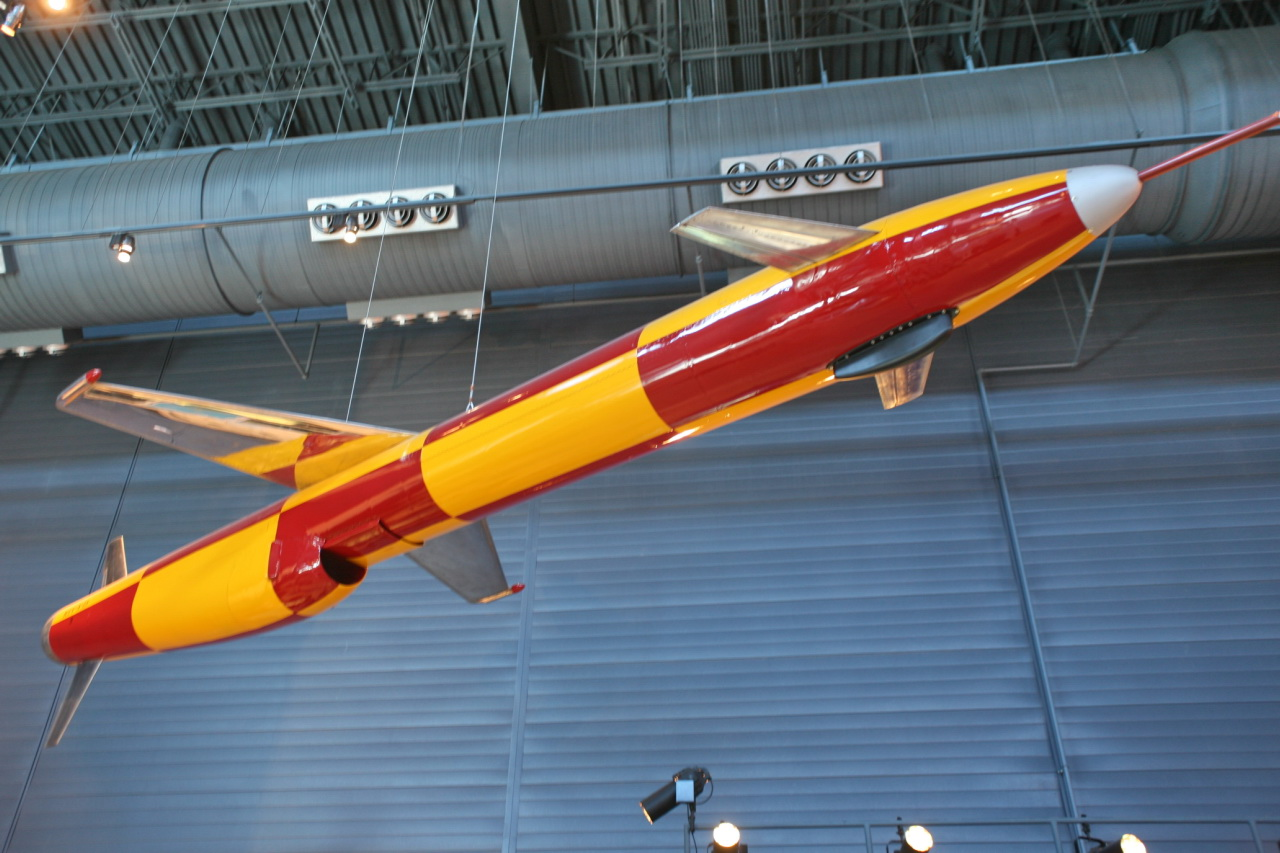
RTV-N-15 at the Udvar-Hazy Center

The RTV-N-15 Pollux was derived from the Gorgon IIC airframe, the pulsejet engine being moved to an internal mounting, and it was intended to use a mixture of radar and infrared guidance. Pollux was first flown in 1948, however by 1951 it had been flown only three times, and the program was cancelled.

== Surviving aircraft ==
A single example of the RTV-N-15 was donated by the U.S. Navy to the National Air and Space Museum in 1971; it is on display at the Steven F. Udvar-Hazy Center.
