= NADC =

NADC may refer to:

- Naval Air Development Center, Johnsville, Pennsylvania.
- Graduate of the NATO Defence College.
- National Air Defence Corps of Nigeria.
- National Australia Day Council.
