= Marquardt Corporation =

Historical manufacturer of ramjet engines

Vintage Marquardt Corporation ad

Marquardt Corporation was an aeronautical engineering firm started in 1944 as Marquardt Aircraft Company and initially dedicated almost entirely to the development of the ramjet engine. Marquardt designs were developed from the mid-1940s into the early 1960s, but as the ramjet disappeared from military usage, the company turned to other fields.

In 1968 Marquardt was merged with CCI Inc. of Tulsa, OK. The newly merged firm became known as "CCI-Marquardt, Inc.". That name changed back to "CCI Inc." after a few years. Throughout the 1970s and 1980s pieces of Marquardt were sold off or merged with other firms. By the 1990s, one of the remnants of the company, called Marquardt Manufacturing Inc. (MMI) was embroiled in a legal suit with its predecessor organization, which had become principally a landlord who owned the buildings and land where MMI was located. By then, most of the remaining pieces of Marquardt were part of Ferranti in England which was in bankruptcy. MMI subsequently declared bankruptcy and sank into oblivion. The remaining piece, Marquardt Jet Laboratories was sold to Kaiser Aerospace. Kaiser-Marquardt was later sold to Primex in Florida. Primex finally became part of Aerojet Rocketdyne.

== History ==
Roy Edward Marquardt was a 1940 aeronautical engineering graduate of California Institute of Technology who was employed at Northrop during World War II on the YB-35 flying-wing bomber project. While working on problems cooling the engines of the YB-35, which were buried in the trailing edge of the wings, he found that the engine heat could be used to provide useful thrust. This created an interest in the ramjet principle, and in November 1944 he started Marquardt Aircraft in Venice, California to develop and sell ramjet engines. In the late 1940s, the company relocated to Van Nuys, California, adjacent to the Van Nuys Airport.

Marquardt's initial products were wind tunnels, but by the end of their first year they had delivered an experimental 20 inches (0.51 m) ramjet to the United States Navy for testing. The United States Army Air Forces purchased two of the same design early in 1946, and fitted them to the wingtips of a P-51 Mustang fighter for in-flight testing. By this time the Navy had installed theirs on an F7F Tigercat; flight tests commenced in late 1946. Later, the Navy tested the same engines on an XP-83 and F-82 Twin Mustang.

Another early product developed by Marquardt Aircraft was a pulse-jet powered helicopter which was assembled and flown, but never put into production.

Marquardt also provided space and capital for the James B. Lansing Company, a manufacturer of high-quality audio speakers known by the brand "JBL". In the late 1940s, Marquardt took over JBL operations, but the firm was divested when Marquardt was acquired by General Tire and Rubber Company in 1949. JBL speakers are still in production.

=== Growth and acquisitions ===
In 1947 Martin built the Gorgon IV missile testbed, powered by the 20" engine. Four Gorgon flights with the new engines were made that year at Mach 0.85 at 10,000 feet (3,000 m) altitude, and in 1948 a newer engine pushed the speeds to Mach 0.9. Martin eventually won a contract to convert the Gorgon design into a target drone, becoming the KDM-1 Plover, and delivering Marquardt a contract for 600 more 20" engines.

In 1948 the newly created United States Air Force took delivery of several larger 30 in (0.76 m) designs and fitted them to the wingtips of a P-80 Shooting Star, which became the first manned aircraft to be powered by ramjets alone. An even larger 48 in (1.2 m) design was built as a booster for a new interceptor design, but not put into production.

The same year the company also started conversion of the existing engine designs to operate at supersonic speeds. This requires the airflow to be slowed to subsonic speeds for combustion, which is accomplished with a series of shock waves created by a carefully designed inlet. Starting with the existing 20" design from 1947, work progressed until the new engine was ready for use in 1949.

At this point the company had outgrown its Venice plant, and lacked the resources to fund a larger facility. Roy Marquardt sold a controlling interest in the company to General Tire and Rubber Company in 1949, and used the funds to move to a new site in Van Nuys, the former Timm Aircraft factory. The purchase wasn't a happy one for General Tire due to management differences, and after making "only" 25% return in one year, they agreed to sell their share of the company to another investor. Eventually, such an investor was found, and General Tire sold their stake to Laurance Rockefeller in 1950 for $250,000.

In the early 1950s supersonic cruise missile and target drone projects for various roles were quite common. Many of them were designed to be shot down as target drones, or simply crash or explode at the end of their mission, so simplicity and low cost was as important as high-speed performance. This made the ramjet ideally suited to those roles. By 1952 Marquardt was involved in a number of projects, including the Navy's Rigel missile, and the Air Force's CIM-10 Bomarc anti-aircraft missile. To test the new engine design for the Bomarc, the Lockheed X-7 high-speed radio control test aircraft was built.

Over the next few years, the X-7 missile broke many records, and led the Air Force to award Marquardt a contract for the BOMARC missile engines. Originally they had intended to award the production to a larger company with better manufacturing abilities, as the Van Nuys plant wouldn't be able to build the 1,500 engines quickly enough. Instead, the Air Force and Marquardt collaborated on a new plant on the shores of Great Salt Lake just outside Ogden, Utah. The plant opened in June 1957 and delivered the first engines a month ahead of schedule. By 1958 the engine was in full production, leading to an additional engine contract from the Air Force for an equally large run of a more advanced version for the IM-99B "Super BOMARC". Meanwhile, the X-7 continued to break records, eventually setting the speed record for air-breathing vehicles at Mach 4.31.

In 1958 Marquardt purchased the assets of Associated Missile Products Company in Pomona, California (AMPCO), part of AMF Atomic, and named it the Pomona Electronics Division. The Pomona Division designed and manufactured radar simulators used to train navigators, bombardiers, and radar systems operators. In the years following the Marquardt purchase, the Pomona Division created radar simulators for the 412L Weapon Control System in Europe; the GAM-72 (Quail) decoy missile; the GAM-77 (Hound Dog) nuclear missile; the AN/APQ T-10 Simulator for the B-52 Navigator and Bombardier; an Atlas Missile launch simulator; the AN/GPS T-4 air defense radar simulator; and other weapon systems trainers. By 1963, the electronics division accounted for ⅓ of Marquardt's total sales.

Also in 1958, Marquardt purchased the Cooper Development Corporation of Monrovia, California (CDC). Clifford D. Cooper, the founder and president, became a Marquardt vice-president. CDC manufactured high-altitude solid-fuel sounding and weather rockets. Cooper Development had been the company responsible for the upper stages of the missile used to place the first U.S. satellite in orbit - the Explorer I.

By 1959 the company had sales of $70 million (equal to over $600 million in 2020 dollars), and had purchased several other smaller aerospace firms. One of these purchases, Power Systems, led to a number of designs for small rocket motors used as positioning thrusters. This would eventually become one of Marquardt's biggest and most important product lines in the 1960s. During this period the main Van Nuys plant was also involved in research into new systems, including a nuclear-powered ramjet for Project Pluto and a liquid air cycle engine (LACE) for the Air Force's Aerospaceplane efforts. Another new product line started with the introduction of their first ram-air turbine, small air-powered generators for providing aircraft with electric power if the main engine failed. Marquardt also developed and produced thrust reversers for jet engines, as well as afterburners (which are functionally the same as a ramjet). With this diversification came a name change, to Marquardt Corporation.

In 1960, Marquardt established a small research laboratory in Maryland named "Marquardt Special Projects Laboratory" (MSPL), whose principal scientist was Dr. Oleg Enikeieff. Enikeiff, a 1943 graduate of California Institute of Technology, had joined Marquardt after being a research engineer for the Harry C. Miller Lock Company, the owner of Sargent Locks. Oleg's expertise was centered on security devices, and some of his unclassified work while at MSPL included patents for an ID card identification system that would scramble its coded contents after each use so it could not be copied, as well as a system to jam microphones in rooms being used as secure locations, so they could not be 'bugged'. Other work at MSPL was classified.

In 1962, Marquardt was licensed by the Southern Pacific Railroad to design and produce a device called the "Grade Crossing Predictor", developed at Stanford University. Marquardt formed a subsidiary, Marquardt Industrial Products Company (MIPCO), as part of the Pomona, California electronics operations, and began selling the computer to major railroads across the country, and eventually world-wide. It enabled the warning lights and gates at grade-level crossings to be lowered based on the speed of an approaching train, rather than at a fixed distance, reducing grade-crossing congestion in populated areas like Chicago.

In 1964, Marquardt purchased a small aerospace firm in Mineola, New York named Automation Laboratories, Inc. (ALI), principally to use their television broadcast expertise in developing a missile launch simulator for the Sheridan Battle Tank. Marquardt had invented a hemispherical photographic system it named VueMarq, and the marriage of the VueMarq system with the ALI TV technology produced a very advanced Sheridan/Shillelagh gunnery simulator. Marquardt was not the successful bidder on the program, and later in 1965 after the GASL merger was completed, ALI was absorbed into GASL and disappeared as a stand-alone entity.

In 1965, Marquardt merged General Applied Science Laboratories, Inc. (GASL), of Westbury, New York, into the company. GASL had been founded in 1956 by Antonio Ferri and Theodore von Karman.

Von Karman was a Hungarian-born scientist who had emigrated to the United States in 1930. It was von Karman who founded the Jet Propulsion Laboratories (JPL) at the California Institute of Technology in 1944.

Antonio Ferri was an Italian aerospace scientist who studied supersonic flight in Italy prior to World War II. Ferri had doctorates in both Aeronautical Engineering and Electrical Engineering from the University of Rome. During World War II, after the Germans invaded Italy, Ferri destroyed much of his laboratory equipment and hid his research papers from the Germans. Ferri was in hiding as part of a partisan group when President Roosevelt sent the American wartime spy Morris (Moe) Berg of the Office of Strategic Services (forerunner to the CIA) to Europe to convince Italian scientists to emigrate to the U.S., particularly the aeronautical genius Antonio Ferri. Berg had been a major-league catcher prior to the war, and when he returned with Ferri, President Roosevelt remarked "... I see that Moe Berg is still catching very well". Ferri pioneered many breakthroughs in hypersonic flight, including Supersonic Combustion Ramjet (SCRAMJET) propulsion, and research into the proper shaping of airfoils, engine inlets, and hypersonic reentry phenomena. He was one of the early advocates of swept-back wings for high-speed aircraft.

In 1966, Marquardt bought The R. W. Neill Company in Chicago, a manufacturer of communications systems for railroads. Two smaller firms, Howard+Gould, and Western Industries, also in Chicago, were purchased and merged with R. W. Neill. The Neill company was operated as a subsidiary of the Industrial Products group, MIPCO.

=== Small rocket engines ===
In 1962 North American Aviation selected Marquardt to provide the reaction control system engines for the Apollo program spacecraft. By 1970 Marquardt was known primarily as "the" company for small rocket engines and thrusters. Practically all US space vehicles and satellites used their designs, eventually including a major win for the Space Shuttle program. The company developed and provided the 25 and 870 lb. thrusters for the space shuttle.

=== Research and development activities ===
In 1960, Roy Marquardt had told the employees of the company that government procurement of the Bomarc Missile would end in mid-1962, and that an effort must be made to replace that business. His solution was to use the great scientific and engineering capabilities of the company to develop new technologies. In a newsletter for summer, 1960, he said "I believe that one of our more important actions this year has been to greatly increase company-sponsored and financed research and development, a program started late last year ... Much hard work lies ahead if we are to develop the programs and business replacing the Bomarc as it phases out..."

Throughout the late 1950s and 1960s, Marquardt and its subsidiaries were a hot bed of scientific research activity. Marquardt made significant advances in many fields, including space propulsion, medicine, optics, life in space, panoramic photography (the VueMarq System), transportation, hypersonic flight, high-temperature metallurgy, water desalination, slurry fuels, underwater propulsion, ram air turbines, afterburners and thrust-reversers for jet aircraft, computer storage, anti-mortar defense systems, FAX machines, television transmission, LED research, and devices as seemingly mundane as pick-up shoes for electric locomotives powered by third-rail power. Roy Marquardt had always believed that the primary mission of the company was "Dedicated to Keeping the United States First in Technology". He kept a large roster of scientists and engineers in the company, and believed that the technical staff should make up about ⅓ of all the personnel of Marquardt. These large engineering and development costs taxed Marquardt's profits, and although the company remained profitable throughout this period, by 1964 the board of directors hired a new president to change the focus toward more profitability. Unfortunately, this meant Marquardt would have to move forward with only the existing product offerings then being manufactured, with little hope of new breakthroughs and future growth. In 1966, the new president announced that in his first year (1965) he had increased profits in part by the "... elimination of research and development efforts that weren't directly related to the company's current activities".

=== Decline of the ramjet market ===
The market for ramjet engines had largely disappeared by the mid-1960s due to increased performance from turbojet engines, and the belief that rockets were more appropriate for the nation's defense. Marquardt continued low-level development on advanced designs. One system, developed in partnership with Morton Thiokol, placed a solid fuel booster inside the ramjet core. When the solid fuel burned out the ramjet would ignite as normal. The idea was to combine the booster and ramjet into a single airframe, thereby reducing cost, size, and range safety requirements, as nothing would be jettisoned in flight.

Marquardt took advantage of its advanced metal-forming talents to fill the void left by the end of Bomarc ramjet production. Products such as air inlets for the F-4 Phantom, cases for the submarine-launched Polaris missile, leading-edge slats for the Lockheed L-1011, and launch rocket motor cases for TOW missiles became main products of the firm.

However, the sales volume of the company was still below the peak of the early 60s, due to the end of the Bomarc program in Ogden and the B-52 bombardier/navigator simulator program in Pomona.

=== Mergers, sale, and break-up ===
In 1964, the board of directors appointed a new president, John B. Montgomery; the founder, Roy Marquardt, was retained as chairman of the board. The gradual reduction of the company's focus on research and development was begun at that point to improve profitability. Pieces of Marquardt were then sold off over time.

In 1966, Marquardt sold the Pomona Electronics Division, excluding the Industrial Products subsidiary MIPCO, to Conductron, a subsidiary of McDonnell Aircraft. Conductron later became McDonnell-Douglas Electronics.

In 1967, both Dr. Antonio Ferri and Roy Marquardt resigned from the company, completely ending the founders' association with their firms. Roy Marquardt subsequently engaged in numerous charitable activities in the Los Angeles area, while Antonio Ferri became the Vincent Astor Professor of Aerospace Sciences at New York University.

In 1968 Marquardt merged with CCI Inc. in Tulsa, OK, and formed a new company CCI-Marquardt. This merger permitted CCI to become listed on the New York Stock Exchange, using the listing that had been Marquardt's. Within a few years, the name of the company was changed back to "CCI Inc." and the effort intensified to spin-off or sell the balance of Marquardt it had acquired in 1968.

Also in 1968, The R. W. Neill Company, part of the industrial products group MIPCO, was spun off for an undisclosed amount and became the Larry McGee Company. Larry McGee had been the vice-president of sales and marketing for R. W. Neill Company. The Larry McGee Company is now part of Miller Ingenuity in Minnesota.

General Applied Sciences Laboratories (GASL) in New York was divested. Its ownership has passed through a series of owners including GenCorp, Allied Aerospace, and Alliant Techsystems; it is now part of Northrop Grumman Innovation Systems, located on eastern Long Island, New York.

Over the next few years, several additional parts of Marquardt were sold or spun off. In 1971 MIPCO (Marquardt Industrial Products Company) was combined with another CCI rail equipment subsidiary and named Safetran Systems, a company that has subsequently passed through several ownerships including Hawker Siddeley in England, and is now part of Siemens Rail Systems.

In 1971, Marquardt Marine Products Division was sold to Ametek. MMP had been formed originally to manufacture and market the doppler navigation products of the Janus Division of GASL in New York.

In 1973, CCI formed a company named CCI Life Products to develop and market a Marquardt-invented kidney dialysis machine. The device, using a method called sorbent dialysis had been developed by Marquardt while its scientists were conducting a study for NASA on water purification during long-duration space missions. In 1978 this subsidiary was sold to Akzo NV in the Netherlands, which became Organon Teknika. The REDY system for home dialysis was then marketed world-wide.

Finally, in 1983 the balance of the company was purchased by the ISC Defense and Space Group International Signal and Control. In 1987, ISC was purchased by British-based Ferranti.

=== Ferranti bankruptcy ===
In 1989, Ferranti discovered a huge defense contract fraud at ISC amounting to $1-billion (perhaps equivalent to $3 billion in 2020 dollars), masterminded by James Guerin, ISC's deputy chairman prior to the merger. Guerin subsequently received a 15-year prison sentence for fraud and arms smuggling. This led to a restructuring at Ferranti and the plan to sell off some of the assets they had acquired from ISC.

Ferranti declared bankruptcy in 1991. In August 1991 one of the main Marquardt businesses, the manufacturing of components for Rockeye cluster bombs and other weapons, was sold to a group of investors who formed a new company called Marquardt Manufacturing Inc. In December 1991, the other main business, a rocket-propulsion division, was sold to Kaiser Aerospace & Electronics Corp. The original Marquardt Co. became principally a landlord, retaining ownership of 56 acres and several buildings near Van Nuys Airport. MMI and the original Marquardt Co. became embroiled in a lawsuit, which led to the bankruptcy and disappearance of Marquardt Manufacturing.

Kaiser reportedly picked up the Marquardt Jet Laboratory for a mere $1 million, with about $50 million in outstanding Space Shuttle contracts. Kaiser sold the bipropellant rocket engine product line to Primex Technologies in 2000 (now Aerojet Rocketdyne) and closed the Van Nuys plant in 2001.

With the sale of Kaiser-Marquardt and the thruster rocket business to Primex in 2000, the name Marquardt disappeared completely from American aerospace industry.

== Products ==
=== Pulsejets ===
- Marquardt PJ40
- Marquardt PJ46

=== Ramjets ===
- Marquardt RJ30
- Marquardt RJ31
- Marquardt RJ34
- Marquardt RJ39
- Marquardt RJ43
- Marquardt RJ57
- Marquardt RJ59

=== Other ===
- Marquardt Space Sled
- Marquardt R-4D 100 lbf (440 N) thrust reaction control engines were used on both the Apollo Lunar Module and the Command Service Module on all the crewed moon flights.
- Bigeye bomb, a binary chemical weapon

== See also ==
- Ramjet engine
- Liquid air cycle engine
