= Naval Aircraft Factory TDN =

1942 US unmanned combat aerial vehicle

TDN
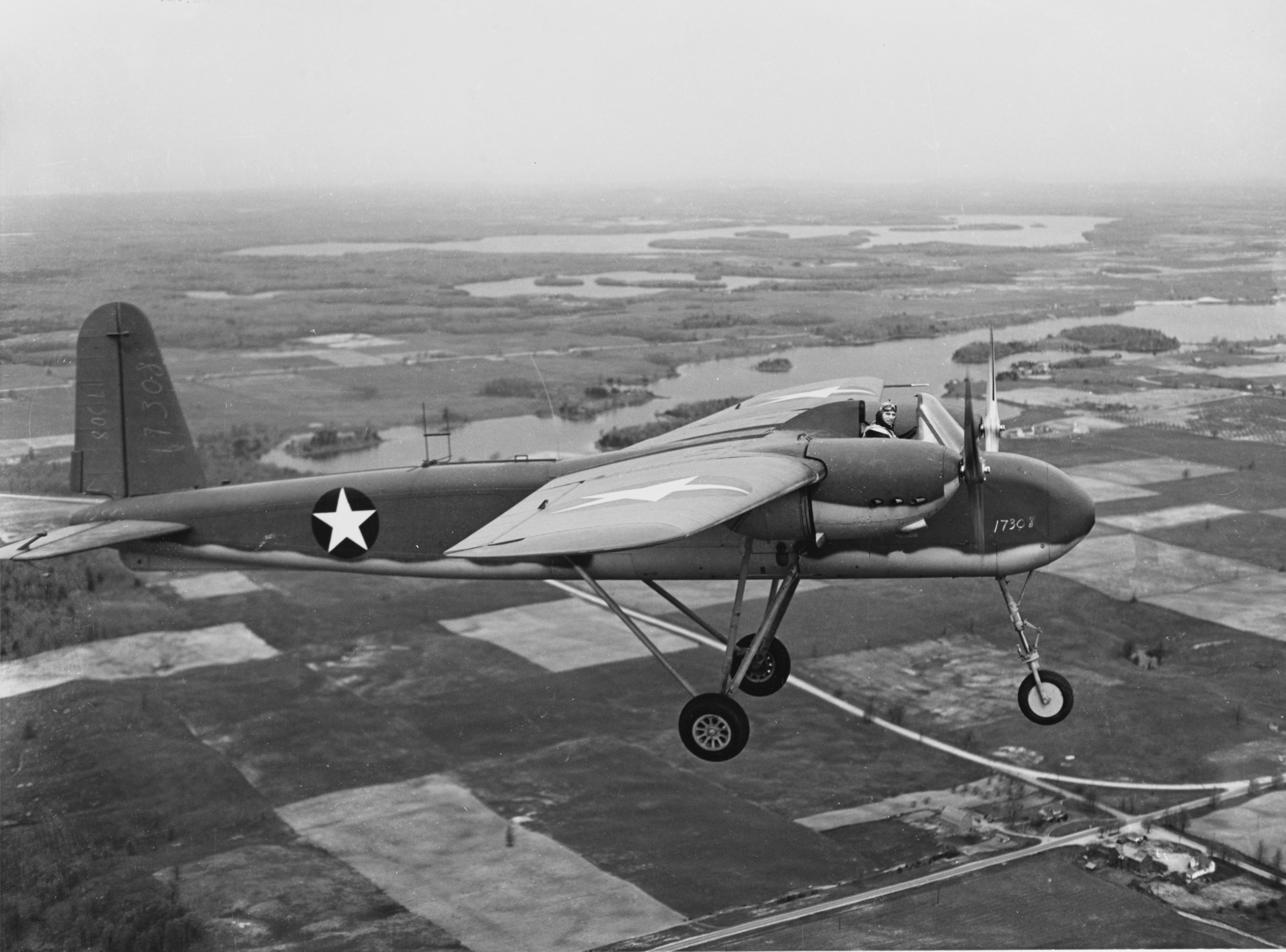

General information
- Type: Assault drone
- National origin: United States
- Manufacturer: Naval Aircraft Factory
- Primary user: United States Navy
- Number built: 104-114

History
- First flight: 15 November 1942

The Naval Aircraft Factory TDN was an early unmanned combat aerial vehicle - referred to at the time as an "assault drone" - developed by the United States Navy's Naval Aircraft Factory during the Second World War. Developed and tested during 1942 and 1943, the design proved moderately successful, but development of improved drones saw the TDN-1 relegated to second-line duties, and none were used in operational service.

== Design and development ==
The development of the radar altimeter and television in the early 1940s made remotely guided bomb- or torpedo-carrying aircraft a practical proposition. In January 1942, the Naval Aircraft Factory was instructed to initiate the development of such an aircraft, with a go-ahead for prototype construction being given in February. A production contract for 100 aircraft was issued in March, with John S. Kean being assigned as TDN-1 project manager, with the aircraft being designed to be capable of using either television or radar guidance. Constructed mainly from wood, the TDN-1 had a fixed tricycle landing gear, and could be fitted with a conventional cockpit in place of its guidance equipment for test flights.

In an example of the use of companies traditionally uninvolved in the aviation industry to reduce interference with higher priority projects, production of the final thirty aircraft was licensed to the Brunswick-Balke-Collender Company, a Michigan-based manufacturer of bowling balls and billiard tables.

== Operational history ==
One hundred production TDN-1 aircraft were ordered in March 1942. Despite being specifically designed to be a simple, low-performance aircraft, and despite proving promising in testing, the type was considered to be too complicated and expensive for use operationally. The improved Interstate TDR was selected for development as an alternative, the majority of TDN-1s being used in the test, liaison and training roles, with some being expended as aerial targets. The TDN-1 is often credited as the first US drone to take off from an aircraft carrier freely (USS Sable). An Airspeed Queen Wasp had already been catapulted from HMS Pegasus in 1937.

== Variants ==
XTDN-1
Four prototype aircraft powered by Franklin O-300 engines.
TDN-1
Production version of XTDN-1; 100 aircraft produced.

== Operators ==
United States

- United States Navy

== Specifications (TDN-1) ==
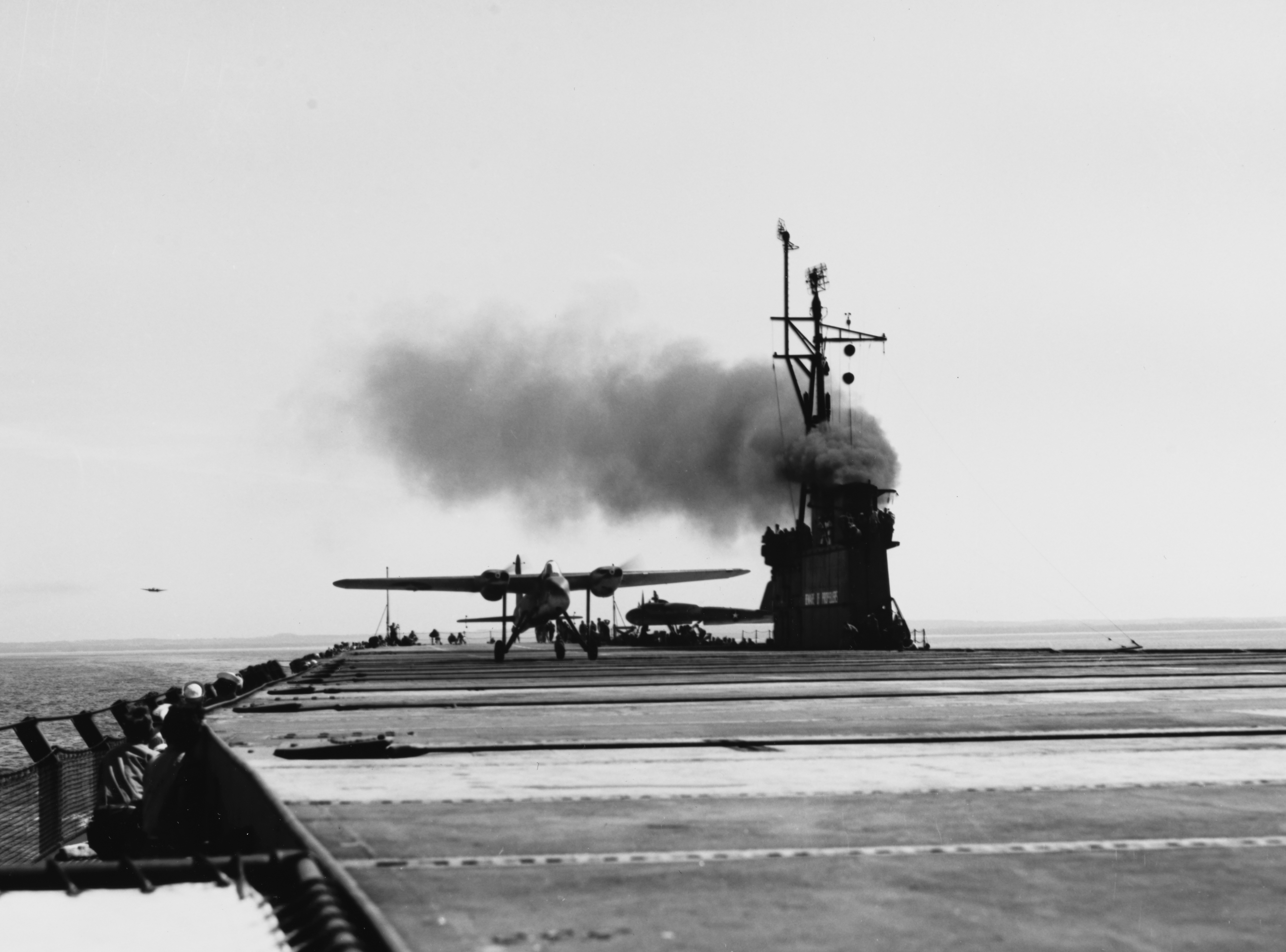
TDN-1 aircraft aboard USS Sable.

Data from

General characteristics

- Crew: 0-1 (optional pilot)
- Length: 37 ft (11 m)
- Wingspan: 48 ft (15 m)
- Powerplant: 2 × Lycoming O-435-2 horizontally-opposed six-cylinder piston engines, 220 hp (160 kW) each
- Cruise speed: 145 mph (233 km/h, 126 kn)

Armament

- one 2,000-pound (910 kg) bomb or aerial torpedo.

== See also ==
- History of unmanned aerial vehicles

Aircraft of comparable role, configuration, and era

- Gorgon (U.S. missile)
- Interstate TDR
- LTV-N-2 Loon
- McDonnell LBD Gargoyle

Related lists

- List of unmanned aerial vehicles
- List of United States Navy aircraft designations (pre-1962)
