= Shenandoah Woods =

Ghost town in Pennsylvania, United States

- Residential area
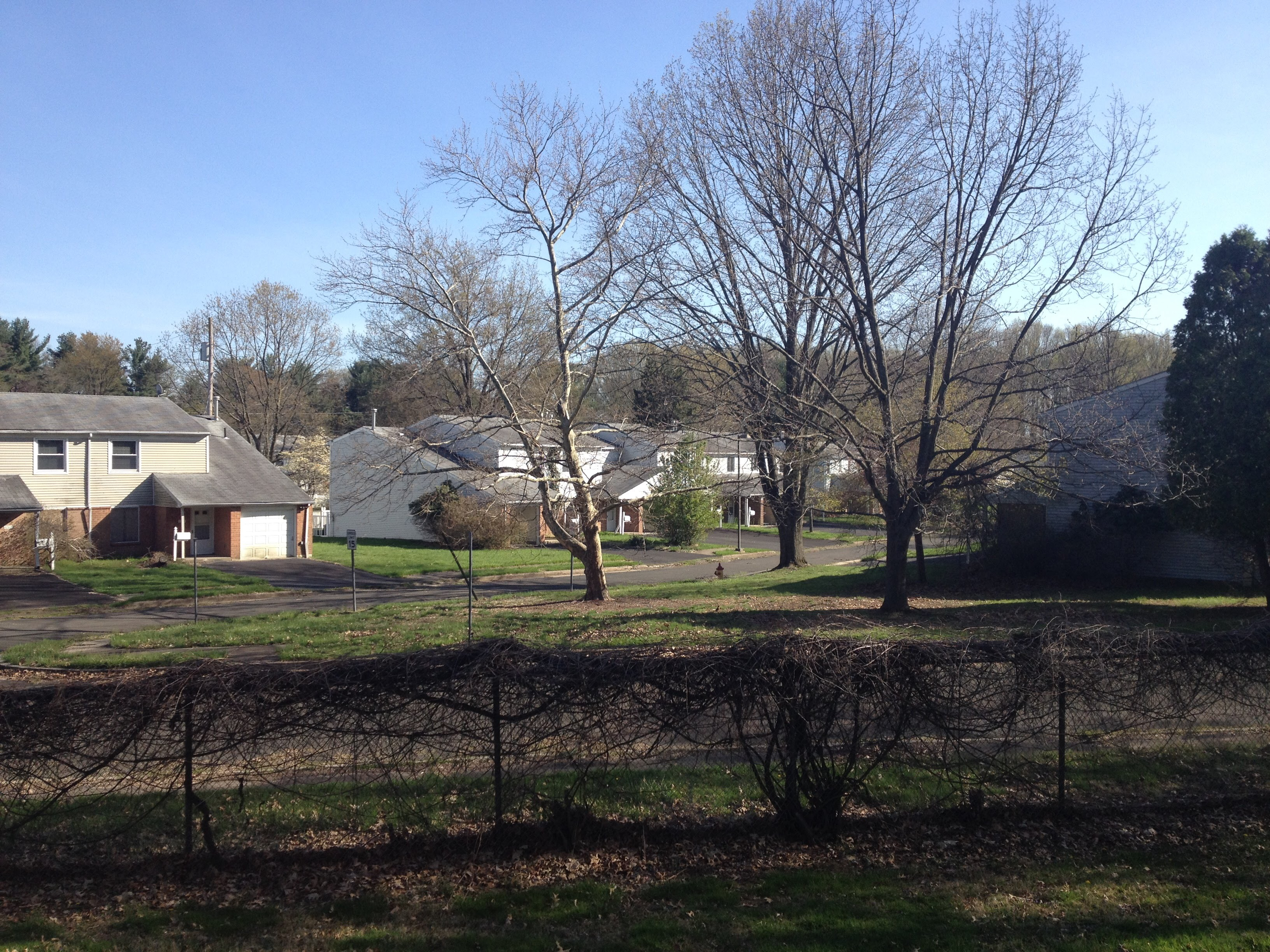
- Abandoned homes in Shenandoah Woods

- Location within Pennsylvania Location within the United States
- Coordinates: 40°11′54.85″N 75°03′08.17″W
- Country: United States
- State: Pennsylvania
- County: Bucks
- Elevation: 375 ft (114 m)

Population
  - Total: 0
- Time zone: UTC-5 (Eastern (EST))
  - Summer (DST): UTC-4 (EDT)
- GNIS feature ID: 2512323

Shenandoah Woods was an abandoned residential neighborhood and ghost town located in Warminster Township, Bucks County, Pennsylvania. Originally developed as housing for military families stationed at the nearby Naval Air Warfare Center Warminster (NAWC), the area remained overgrown and deteriorating until 2023, when the local government razed all 199 houses.

== History ==
Shenandoah Woods was constructed in 1974 during the Cold War era to provide accommodation for U.S. Navy personnel and their families. Its proximity to the NAWC made it a convenient location for those working at the base. The community included rows of identical duplexes and townhouses built in the mid-20th century, reflecting the architectural style of the time.

In 1989, the EPA declared the location a national Superfund toxic waste site.

In 1997, the NAWC was decommissioned as part of a broader base realignment and closure process. This led to the vacating of Shenandoah Woods, as its primary residents were no longer stationed at the base. In 2011, it was discovered that the NAWC's activities had contributed to soil and groundwater pollution in the immediate area surrounding the base with five chemical compounds identified to be harmful to humans, primarily per- and polyfluoroalkyl substances (PFAS), which are linked to the use of firefighting foams. It was later revealed that the U.S. Navy had conducted training exercises with the foams around the area. The contamination of the area led to widespread concerns about public health and environmental safety. Residents living near the former base reported worries about the long-term effects of exposure to the contaminated water supply, including cancer, and some nearby wells were shut down as a precaution. The discovery also complicated redevelopment efforts, as significant remediation would be required to make the site safe for future use. Local and federal agencies, including the EPA, were involved in assessing and addressing the contamination, and the previous location of the NAWC was declared a superfund site. A federal disease registry concluded in 2016 that exposure to PFAS levels found at and around the NAWC posed a public health hazard, culminating in the 55 acre property being transferred to the Warminster Township government in 2017, which began demolition in 2022.

== Future Plans ==
In recent years, Warminster Township has explored various options for the land's reuse. Environmental cleanup remains a prerequisite for any redevelopment. In 2023, it was announced that the property would be converted into trails and become part of the township's parks and trails system after receiving $1.5 million in funding through the United States Congress, by way of representative Brian Fitzpatrick.
