= Interstate TDR =

UCAV created in 1944, used by the US Navy

TDR
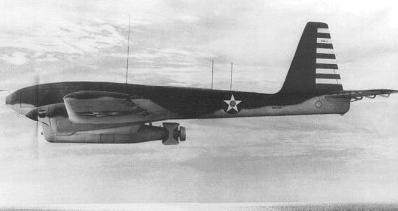
- TDR-1 in flight with aerial torpedo.

General information
- Type: Assault drone
- National origin: United States
- Manufacturer: Interstate Aircraft
- Primary user: United States Navy
- Number built: 195

History
- Introduction date: September 1944
- First flight: 1942
- Retired: October 1944

The Interstate TDR was an early unmanned combat aerial vehicle — referred to at the time as an "assault drone" — developed by the Interstate Aircraft and Engineering Corporation during the Second World War for use by the United States Navy. Capable of being armed with bombs or torpedoes, 2,000 aircraft were ordered, but only around 200 were built. The type saw some service in the Pacific Theater against the Japanese, but continuing developmental issues affecting the aircraft, along with the success of operations using more conventional weapons, led to the decision being made to cancel the assault drone program in October 1944.

== Design and development ==
In 1936, Lieutenant Commander Delmar S. Fahrney proposed that unpiloted, remotely controlled aircraft had potential for use by the United States Navy in combat operations. Due to the limitations of the technology of the time, development of the "assault drone" project was given a low priority, but by the early 1940s the development of the radar altimeter and television made the project more feasible, and following trials using converted manned aircraft, the first operational test of a drone against a naval target was conducted in April 1942. That same month, following trials of the Naval Aircraft Factory TDN assault drone, Interstate Aircraft received a contract from the Navy for two prototype and 100 production aircraft to a simplified and improved design, to be designated TDR-1.

Control of the TDR-1 would be conducted from either a control aircraft, usually a Grumman TBF Avenger, with the operator viewing a television screen showing the view from a camera mounted aboard the drone along with the radar altimeter's readout, or via a pilot on board the TDR-1 for test flights. Powered by two Lycoming O-435 engines of 220 horsepower (160 kW) each, the TDR-1 used a remarkably simple design, with a steel-tube frame constructed by the Schwinn bicycle company covered with a molded wood skin, thus making little use of strategic materials so as not to impede production of higher priority aircraft. Capable of being optionally piloted for test flights, an aerodynamic fairing was used to cover the cockpit area during operational missions. The TDR-1 was equipped with a fixed tricycle landing gear that would be jettisoned in operation after takeoff for improved performance.

In September 1942, the U.S. Navy chose DeKalb, Illinois to be the site for the manufacture of the drone TDR-1 aircraft, and built an airport on the city's east side. This early airport consisted of an airfield and a large hangar that were fenced and guarded around the clock. DeKalb was chosen because Wurlitzer, manufacturer of pianos, and known for its expertise in the production of wood products, was located there. Interstate Aircraft and Engineering Corporation (based in El Segundo, California) assembled the planes at the new airport in DeKalb. About two hundred drones were built, tested, and boxed at the DeKalb Airport and were shipped to the South Pacific, where they were used against the enemy during World War II.

== Operational history ==
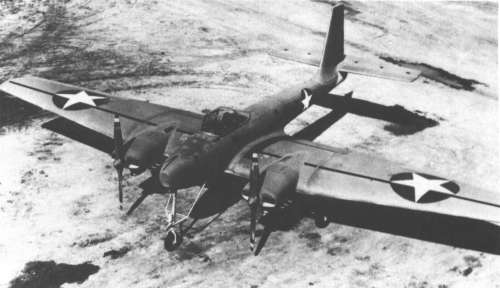
Interstate XBQ-4

Under the code-name Operation Option, the U.S. Navy projected that up to 18 squadrons of assault drones would be formed, with 162 Grumman TBF Avenger control aircraft and 1000 assault drones being ordered. However technical difficulties in the development of the TDR-1, combined with a continued low priority given to the project, saw the contract modified with the order reduced to only around 300 aircraft. A single TDR-1 was tested by the U.S. Army Air Forces as the XBQ-4; however, no production contract resulted from this testing.

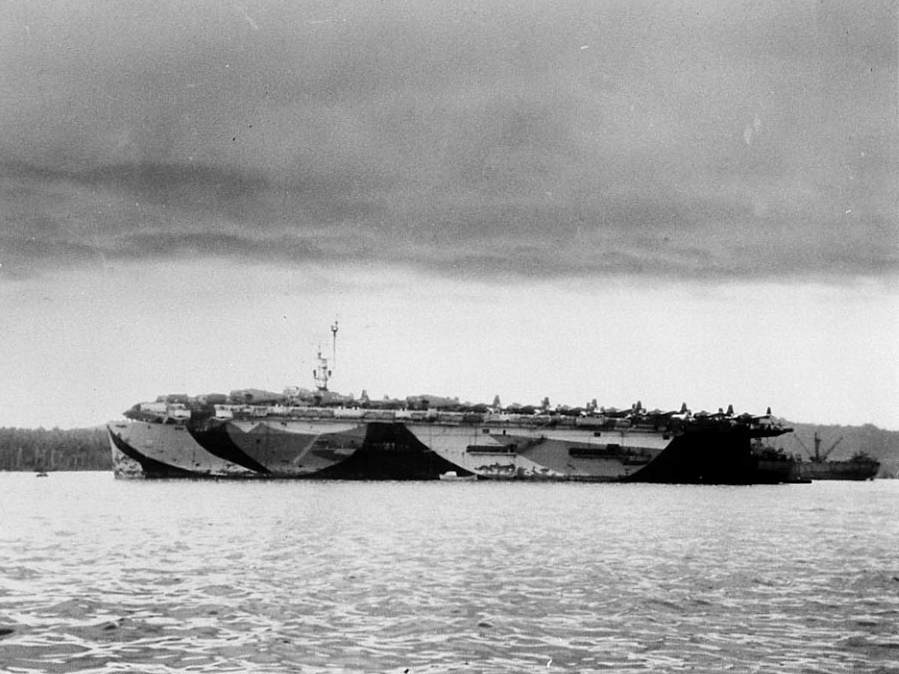
USS Marcus Island (CVE-77), transporting TDR-1s and associated TBM Avenger control aircraft to South West Pacific theatre (June 1944)

In 1944, under the control of the Special Air Task Force (SATFOR), the TDR-1 was deployed operationally to the South Pacific for operations against the Japanese. Additional testing was conducted by SATFOR in July, complete with a strike against a previously beached Japanese freighter, Yumasuki Maru, including management of the flight from a 7 miles (11 km) distant TBM Avenger control aircraft, which could monitor the view from the TDRs via early television technology.

SATFOR equipped a single mixed squadron, Special Task Air Group 1 (STAG-1), with TDR-1 aircraft and TBM Avenger control aircraft; the first operational mission took place on 27 September, conducting bombing operations against Japanese ships. Despite this success, the assault drone program had already been canceled after the production of 189 TDR-1 aircraft, due to a combination of continued technical problems, the aircraft failing to live up to expectations, and the fact that more conventional weaponry was proving adequate for the defeat of Japan. The final mission was flown on 27 October, with 50 drones having been expended on operations, 31 aircraft successfully striking their targets, without loss to the pilots of STAG-1.

Following the war, some TDR-1s were converted for operation as private sportsplanes.

== Variants ==
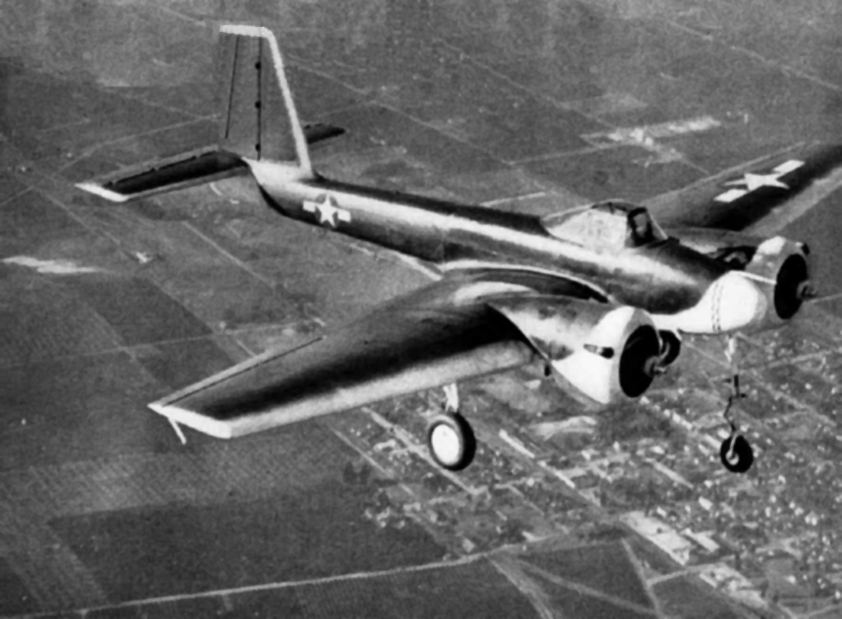
Interstate XTD3R

- XTDR-1 – Two prototypes.
- TDR-1 – Production version of XTDR-1, 189 aircraft produced.
- XTD2R-1 – Variant with two Franklin O-805-2 engines, two prototypes ordered, canceled in favor of TD3R.
- XTD3R-1 – Variant with Wright R-975 radial engines, three prototypes.
- XTD3R-2 – Variant of XTD3R-1, one prototype.
- TD3R-1 – Production version of XTD3R-1, 40 aircraft ordered but cancelled.
- XBQ-4 – Army designation for TDR-1. One aircraft converted from TDR-1.
- XBQ-5 – Army designation for XTD2R-1. Designation reserved but no aircraft ordered.
- XBQ-6 – Army designation for XTD3R. No aircraft produced.
- BQ-6A – Army designation for TD3R-1. No aircraft produced.

== Operators ==
United States

- United States Army Air Forces
- United States Navy

== Aircraft on display ==
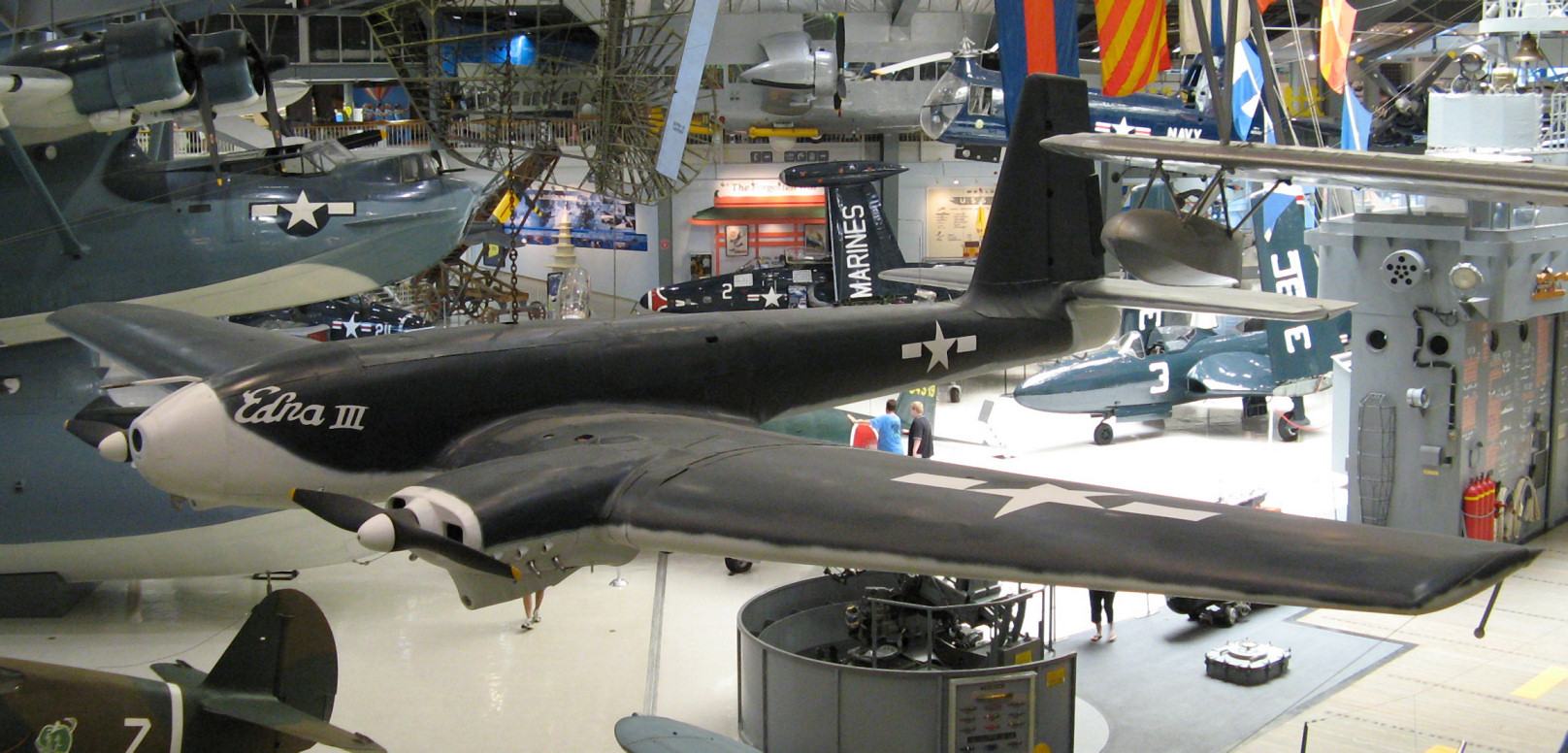
Interstate TDR-1 on display at the National Naval Aviation Museum

A single example of the TDR-1 survives, and is on display at the U.S. Navy's National Naval Aviation Museum in Pensacola, Florida.

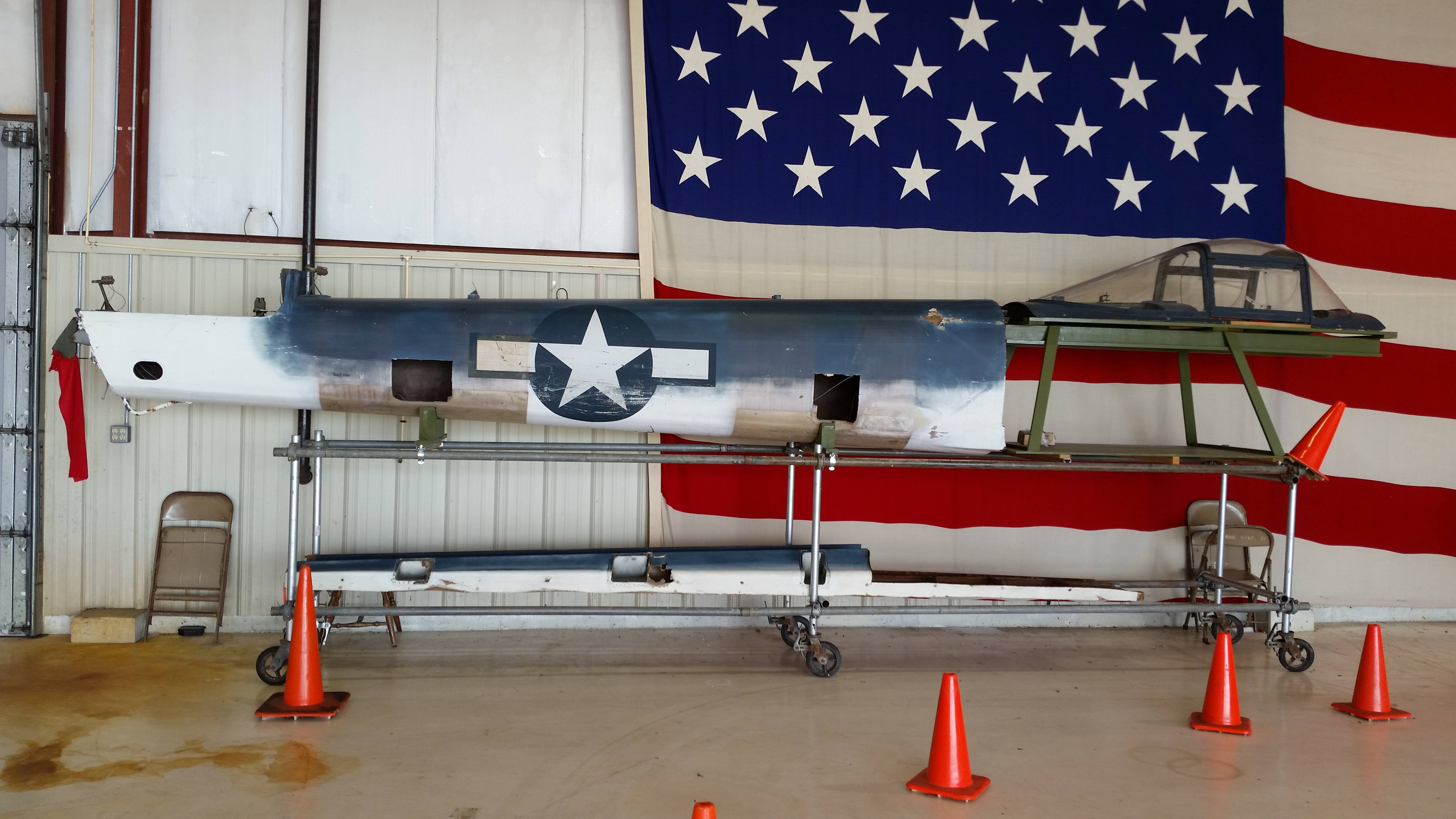
Interstate TDR parts at DeKalb Airport, 2017

Various TDR parts are being collected at DeKalb Taylor Municipal Airport in the hope of reconstructing another entire airframe for display.

== Specifications (TDR-1) ==
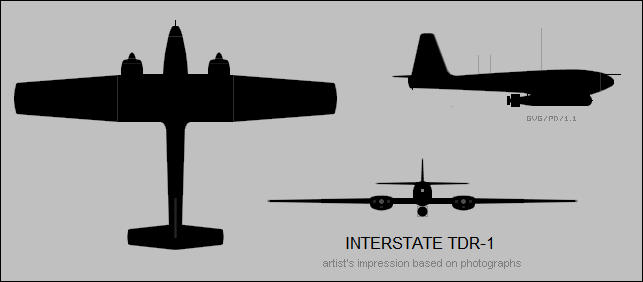
Three view of TDR-1

Data from Parsch

General characteristics

- Crew: 0–1 (optional pilot)
- Wingspan: 48 ft (15 m)
- Gross weight: 5,900 lb (2,676 kg)
- Powerplant: 2 × Lycoming O-435-2 opposed piston engines, 220 hp (160 kW) each

Performance

- Cruise speed: 140 mph (230 km/h, 120 kn)
- Range: 425 mi (684 km, 369 nmi)

Armament

- One 2,000-pound (910 kg) bomb or one aerial torpedo

== See also ==
- History of unmanned aerial vehicles

Related development

- Naval Aircraft Factory TDN

Aircraft of comparable role, configuration, and era

- Gorgon (U.S. missile)
- Interstate XBDR
- LTV-N-2 Loon
- McDonnell LBD Gargoyle

Related lists

- List of unmanned aerial vehicles
- List of United States Navy aircraft designations (pre-1962)
