= Marquardt Space Sled =

Proposed device intended for use on untethered spacewalks

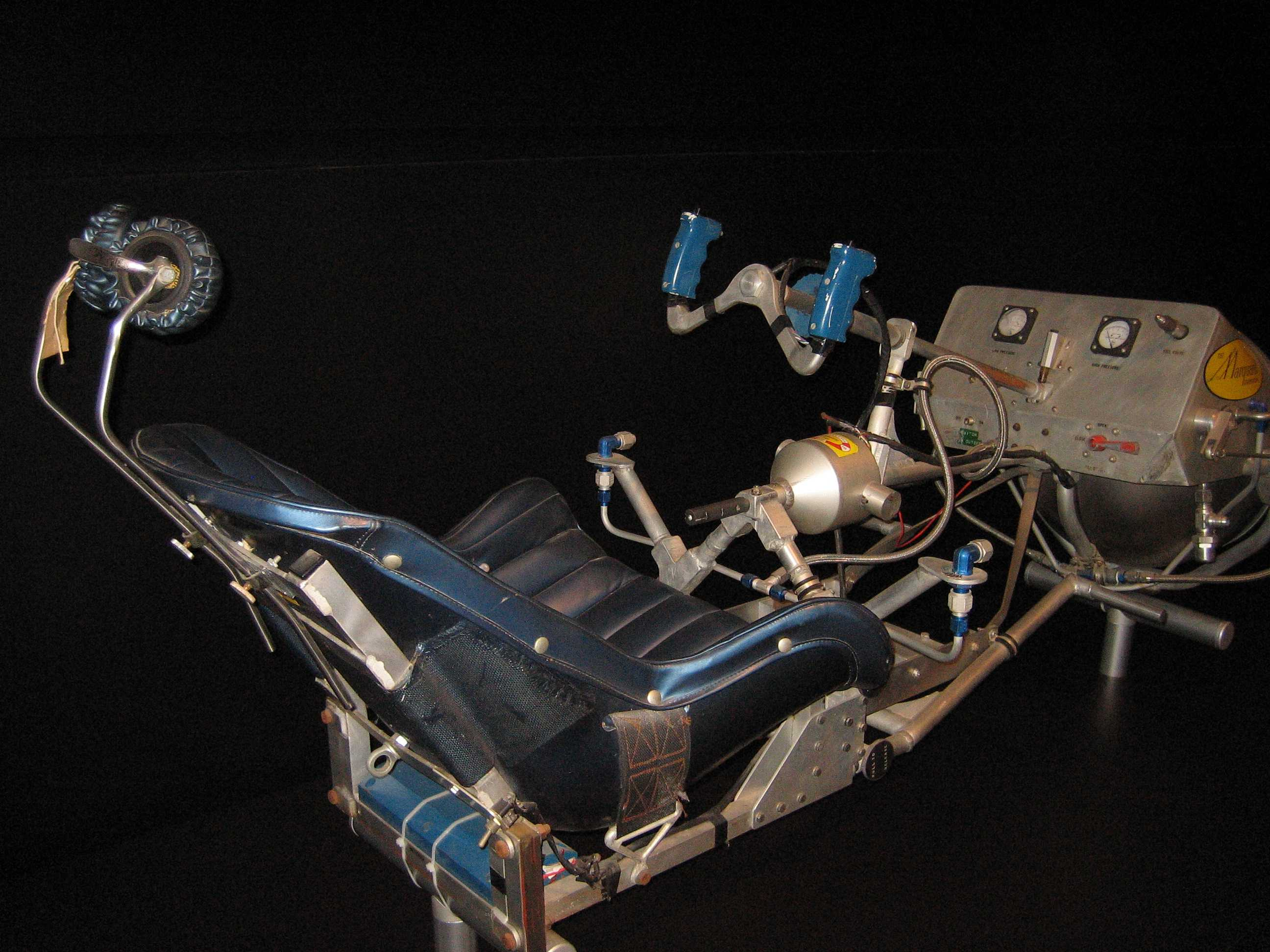

The Marquardt Space Sled, on display at the National Museum of the United States Air Force in Dayton, Ohio

The Marquardt Space Sled was developed by the Marquardt Corporation in the 1960s as part of an effort to build a device that would allow astronauts to maneuver freely in space without needing to be tethered to their spacecraft or stations.

The design was shelved in favor of technology that evolved into maneuvering systems like the MMU of the Space Shuttle and the SAFER system used by the crew of the International Space Station.

== See also ==
- Manned Maneuvering Unit
- Jet pack
- Simplified Aid For EVA Rescue (SAFER)
- National Museum of the United States Air Force
