= PTV-N-2 Gorgon IV =

PTV-N-2 Gorgon IV KDM Plover
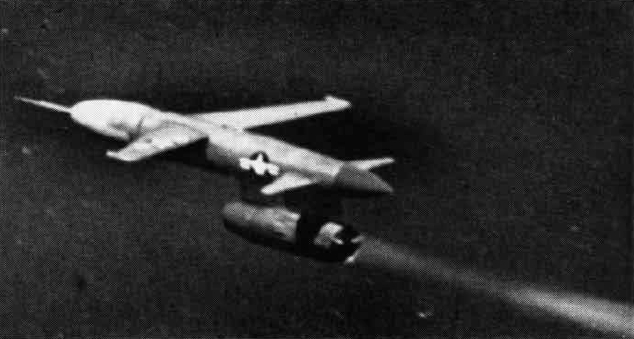
- A Plover target drone in flight, 1952
- Type: Propulsion test vehicle Target drone
- Place of origin: United States

Service history
- In service: 1947–1952
- Used by: United States Navy

Production history
- Designed: 1945–1947
- Manufacturer: Glenn L. Martin Company
- No. built: 19

Specifications
- Mass: 1,589 pounds (721 kg)
- Length: 21 feet 8 inches (6.60 m)
- Height: 4 feet 4 inches (1.32 m)
- Wingspan: 10 feet (3.0 m)
- Engine: one Marquardt XRJ30-MA ramjet 1,500 lbf (6,700 N) thrust
- Operational range: 70 miles (110 km)
- Flight ceiling: 35,000 feet (11,000 m)
- Maximum speed: Mach 0.85
- Guidance system: Autopilot plus radio command

The PTV-N-2 Gorgon IV was a subsonic ramjet-powered missile developed by the Glenn L. Martin Company for the United States Navy. Originally intended as an air-to-surface weapon, it materialized as a propulsion test vehicle, and between 1947 and 1950 was used for test purposes and, as the KDM Plover, as a target drone.

== Design and development ==
Development of the Gorgon IV began in May 1945, when the U.S. Navy's Bureau of Aeronautics contracted with the Glenn L. Martin Company, as part of Project Gorgon, to develop an air-to-surface missile, powered by a ramjet engine and using active radar homing for guidance. The end of World War II saw a reduction in need for such a weapon, however the contract was continued in 1946 as a propulsion test vehicle, originally designated KUM-1, then PTV-2 before finally being redesignated PTV-N-2.

The PTV-N-2 was of fairly conventional design, with mildly-swept wings and a conventional empennage; roll control was through spoilerons. The Marquardt XRJ30 ramjet engine was mounted below the aft fuselage, and the vehicle was fitted with drag brakes to prevent exceeding the engine's design limits.

Flight control was through a combination of a preset course via autopilot and radio command guidance; the vehicle was equipped with radio telemetry to transmit data. Following the end of each test flight, the vehicle would deploy a parachute for recovery in the ocean; the vehicles were said to be in such good condition that it would be possible to re-fly them after cleaning them of salt water residue.

== Operational history ==
Nineteen PTV-N-2s were produced, with flight tests beginning in July 1947; in November, the program having adopted Northrop F2T night-fighters as launch aircraft, the Gorgon IV first achieved high-speed flight, reaching approximately Mach 0.85; it was the first ramjet-powered winged aircraft to successfully fly in the United States, and it was claimed that the missile's speed was deliberately restricted to keep it below the speed of sound. A flight time of 11 minutes 15 seconds, a record at the time for ramjets, was achieved on the second flight test.

The test program continued through December 1949, originally at the Naval Air Missile Test Center test range at Point Mugu, California; testing was later moved to the Naval Aviation Ordnance Test Station in Chincoteague, Virginia in order to be closer to Martin's factory. The Navy began a refit of USS Norton Sound to test the feasibility of launching Gorgon IVs from an at-sea platform, however the project was cancelled before completion. Despite this the program was considered to be "very successful" by the Navy. Following the end of the program, the remaining PTV-N-2s were assigned as target drones, given the designation KDM-1 Plover. The Gorgon IV airframe was also used as the basis of the ASM-N-5 Gorgon V chemical weapons dispenser.

== Surviving aircraft ==
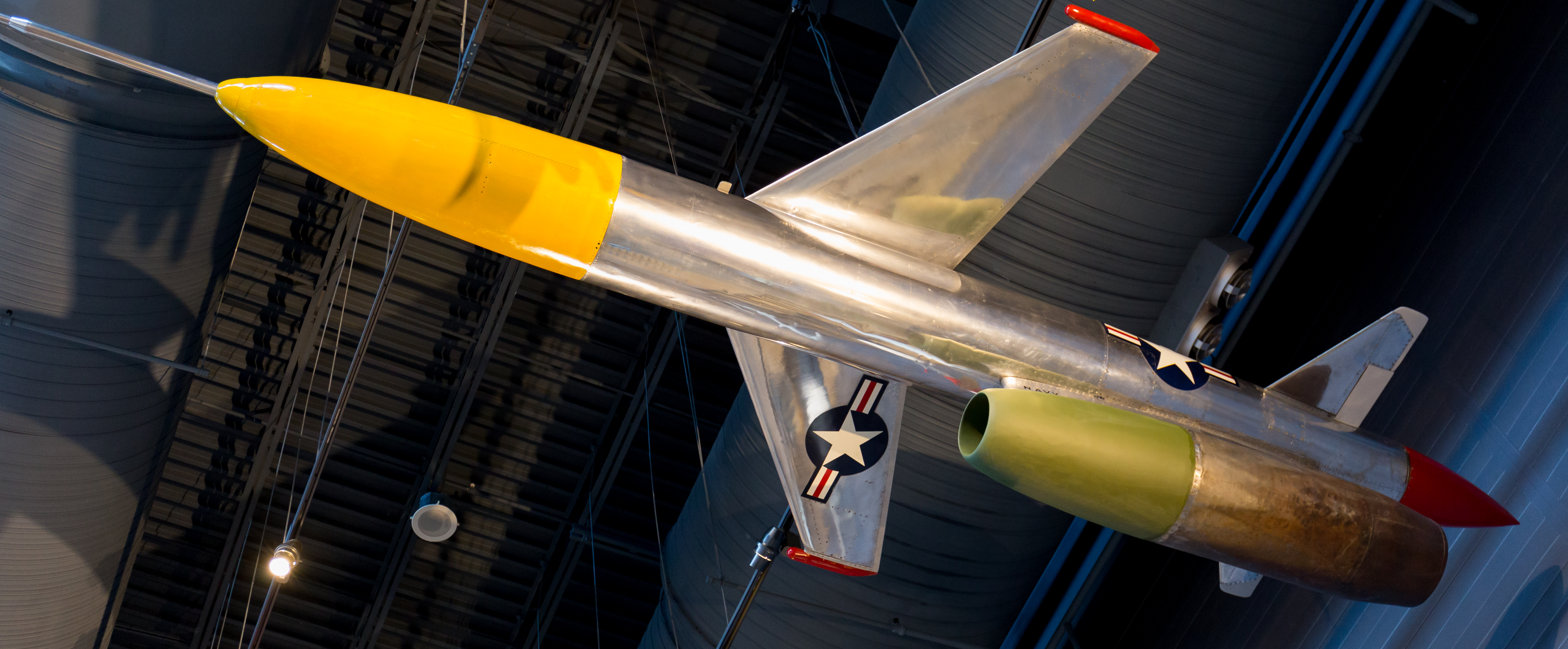
KDM-1 drone at the Udvar-Hazy Center

A recovered Gorgon IV was donated by the U.S. Navy to the National Air and Space Museum in 1966; it is on display at the Steven F. Udvar-Hazy Center.

== See also ==
Related development

- ASM-N-5 Gorgon V
- NAMU KDN Gorgon

Aircraft of comparable role, configuration, and era

- Aviolanda AT-21

Related lists

- List of unmanned aerial vehicles
