= Roy Edward Marquardt =

American aerospace engineer (1917-1982)

Roy Edward Marquardt (24 December 1917 – 20 October 1982) was an aerospace engineer who rose to prominence in the design and production of ramjets. He created Marquardt Aircraft (later named Marquardt Corporation) and branched out into other aerospace designs and products.

== Early years ==
Roy was born in Burlington, Iowa, on Christmas Eve in 1917.

As a young boy, Roy was fascinated with flight and designed and flew model airplanes powered by rubber bands. At the age of 12, he was teaching model building at the Burlington YMCA. Before he was 14 years old, he had designed an airplane that won the St. Lous Model Airplane Meet by flying for over 30 miles. In high school, he designed a wind tunnel at the Burlington High School, and taught a course in aeronautics. He also designed and built two gliders during his high school years. One of those he crashed flying it himself.

After completing high school, Roy attended the Burlington Junior College and taught an aeronautics course while he continued to run a model airplane business to raise money to pay for school. At the age of 20 he dominated the Mississippi Valley model contest, winning the event with an 8-hour 50-mile flight.

Roy moved to California in 1938 to further his education. After arrival there, he won the California State model contest in 1939.

== Education ==
Roy enrolled in the California Institute of Technology in 1938, initially as Liberal Arts major, but within a year changed his major to Aeronautical Engineering, receiving a bachelor's degree in 1940. He continued his studies at Caltech, receiving a master's degree in 1942. Roy also taught aeronautics at the University of Southern California during his graduate school work.

In 1960, he was awarded an honorary PhD in Science by Iowa Wesleyan University.

== Honors ==
Roy Marquardt was named a fellow of The American Institute of Aeronautics and Astronautics in 1952. He was named a fellow of The American Rocket Society in 1957.

In 1959 he was the first person named "Engineer of the Year" by The Engineers' Council in California. The Council noted that he was "one of the most respected engineers in the San Fernando Valley. His accomplishments and technical innovations became a benchmark to measure all future candidates for this most prestigious honor."

In 1964, Weldon Worth, Chief Scientist of the U. S. Air Force Aero Propulsion Laboratory noted "I've always felt that the Air Force got it's [sic] dollars worth from Marquardt. There's a company which had a low overhead and an ingenious and resourceful test group. There was [a] lack of friction there, and certainly no loss of communications between the company and the Air Force. Roy Marquardt had that enlightened viewpoint – a kind of over-optimistic air about him. But he usually came through with what he promised because he was a natural engineer."

== Ramjet development ==
After graduation in 1942, Roy was employed by Northrop Corporation as engineer in charge of Navy research. The United States had a secret project to design and build a bomber that could reach Europe from the U.S. and return, as there was concern that England might fall and bombing missions would have to originate in North America. This became the Northrop YB-35 "Flying Wing" design.

In order to reduce drag and increase lift, the engines were mounted in the trailing edge of the wing, and the craft used "pusher" propellers. Doing so created a problem of removing heat from the engines in flight. Roy and his team solved the cooling problem, and in the process he discovered that the waste heat could be used to provide additional propulsion. Northrop didn't want to pursue that effort, so Roy went back to USC, where he became Director of Aeronautical Research while still in his mid-20s.

Roy persuaded USC to take a contract from the Naval Bureau of Aeronautics for construction of a ramjet of his design, based on observations he made while working on the YB-35 engine heat issue. Since USC did not have production facilities, they subcontracted the work to Marquardt. Roy and some friends raised $1,000 and started Marquardt Aircraft Company, and then became a subcontractor to USC. They set up work in an open grocery market stall in West Los Angeles; the previous occupant had gone bankrupt. The first ramjet, a 20" diameter model, was constructed almost entirely by hand, with the sheet-metal housing hammered out over the curvature of the curbstone of a nearby street. It was delivered to the Navy in 1945. The newly created United States Air Force purchased several soon thereafter, and tested them first on a North American P-51 Mustang then later on a Lockheed P-80 jet fighter, becoming the first crewed ramjet-powered flight.

The ramjet designs proved successful, and Marquardt Aircraft continued to expand and grow over the next fifteen years. Ramjets got bigger and faster, became supersonic and powered interceptor missiles like the Bomarc CIM-10, which carried a nuclear warhead and could fly at Mach 2.5 up to 80,000 feet for a distance of 400 miles. By 1959, Marquardt's sales had reached $70,000,000, (about $750,000,000 in 2021 dollars). By the late 1950s and early 1960s, Marquardt Corporation grew and diversified, with divisions involved in electronics, space travel, and rocketry. Marquardt produced a wide variety of products including Ram Air Turbines (called "RATS"), jet engine Thrust Reversers, and other aerospace and electronic products.

== Later years ==
The ramjet market collapsed after the end of the Bomarc program as turbojets showed increased capability, and as government officials moved their focus to rockets and intercontinental ballistic missiles. However ramjet development continued at a low level at Marquardt Corporation and other firms.

Roy continued to focus on research in the ensuing years to diversify Marquardt's product offerings, following his mandate that the company be "Dedicated to Keeping the United States First in Technology". These extensive activities taxed profits (although Marquardt remained profitable during the period), but in 1964, an impatient board of directors replaced Roy as President of Marquardt Corporation, in order to change the focus more toward profits. Roy was retained as chairman of the board. His dream of building a 6,000 MPH airliner powered with ramjets was never realized, and many other research projects were cancelled by the new company president.

Roy became disillusioned as the new management began to sell off pieces of his company and cancelled research projects that were not related to the current business activities. He resigned in 1967 from the company that bore his name. Following his career at Marquardt Corporation, Roy served in multiple charities in the Los Angeles area, served as a director of American Jet Industries in California.

== Death ==
Roy Edward Marquardt died from a heart condition, in Canoga Park, CA, on October 20, 1982.
