= DeKalb Taylor Municipal Airport =

Coordinates: 41°56′01.8033″N 088°42′20.471″W

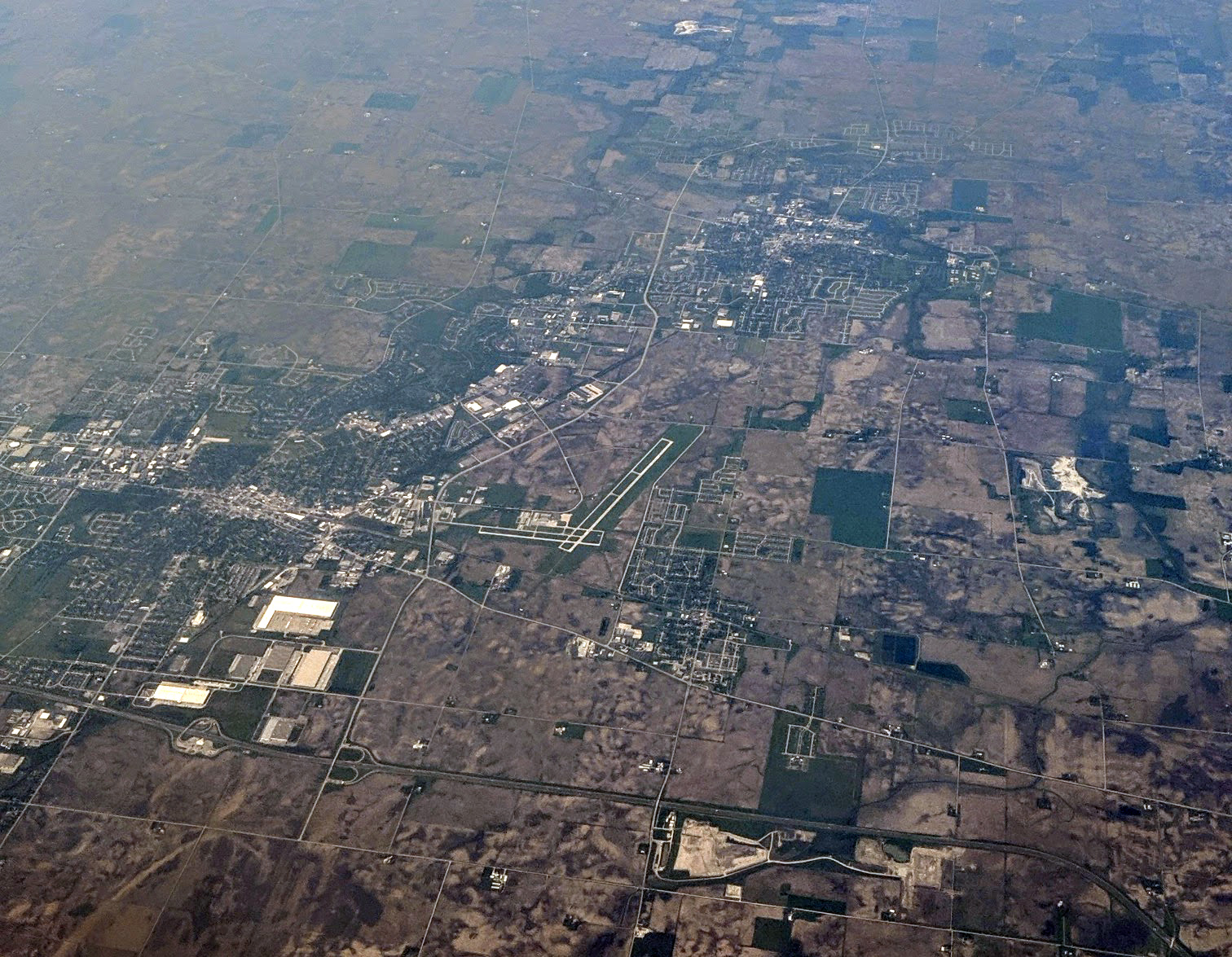
- IATA: none; ICAO: KDKB; FAA LID: DKB

Summary
- Airport type: Public
- Owner: City of DeKalb
- Location: DeKalb, Illinois
- Elevation AMSL: 914 ft / 279 m
- Website: Official website

Map
- Location of airport in Illinois DKB (the United States)

Runways
Direction	Length		Surface
Direction	ft	m	Surface
2/20	7,026	2,142	Asphalt
9/27	4,201	1,280	Asphalt

Statistics
- Based aircraft (2016): 75

DeKalb Taylor Municipal Airport (ICAO: KDKB, FAA LID: DKB), which opened in April 1944, is a general aviation airport and is situated on 920 acres (3.7 km^{2}) at an elevation of 914 ft (279 m) and located two miles (3.2 km) east of DeKalb, Illinois, United States. DeKalb Taylor Municipal Airport is located approximately 60 mi (97 km) west of Chicago. The airport is open 24 hours a day and is owned by the city of DeKalb.

== History ==
During World War II, the U.S. Navy chose DeKalb to be the site for the manufacture of drone TDR-1 aircraft and built an airport on the city's east side. This early airport consisted of an airfield and a large hangar that were fenced and guarded around the clock. DeKalb was chosen because Wurlitzer, a piano manufacturer known for its expertise in the production of wood products, was located there.

Interstate Aircraft and Engineering Corporation (based in El Segundo, California) assembled planes at the new airport in DeKalb. Powered by two Lycoming O-435 engines of 220 horsepower (160 kW) each, the TDR-1 used a remarkably simple design, with a steel-tube frame constructed by the Schwinn bicycle company and covered with a molded wood skin. The TDR-1s were remote controlled and had a TV camera in the nose, and a rotary dial was used to steer them from another aircraft. About 200 drones were built, tested, and boxed at the DeKalb Airport. The aircraft were shipped to the South Pacific, where they were used against the enemy during World War II.

Interstate Aircraft went out of business in 1948, and, at that time, the City of DeKalb purchased the airport runways and modest facilities. The city named it the DeKalb Municipal Airport.

Willard Rue "Pete" Taylor was a DeKalb pilot, entrepreneur and airplane enthusiast. Even before the city of DeKalb had its own airport, Taylor ran two separate airfields in the cornfields around DeKalb. He also ran an airplane salvage business and sold airplane parts. As part of his flying service, he gave flying lessons, ran charter flights, flew his sick neighbors to hospitals, gave airplane rides to local children, and began crop dusting, which was a first for DeKalb. In 1948, Taylor was named the first airport manager of the new DeKalb Municipal Airport, and he held this position until 1962. He was also granted a lease at the new airport, and he moved his business, Taylor Flying Service, there.

When the City of DeKalb acquired the airport in 1948, the buildings had not been in use since the end of World War II in 1945. The plumbing was in bad shape and the roofs in disrepair. Taylor handled repairs and improvements. He built 13 hangars and a repair shop, and even added a restaurant operated by his wife and fellow pilot, Ethel Taylor.

Taylor was a prominent DeKalb citizen, who served as a DeKalb Alderman, served on several city committees, and was influential in the airport's and community's history. After his death in 1983, in his honor, the city of DeKalb renamed the airport to DeKalb Taylor Municipal Airport. In 2001, Taylor was inducted into the Illinois Aviation Hall of Fame.

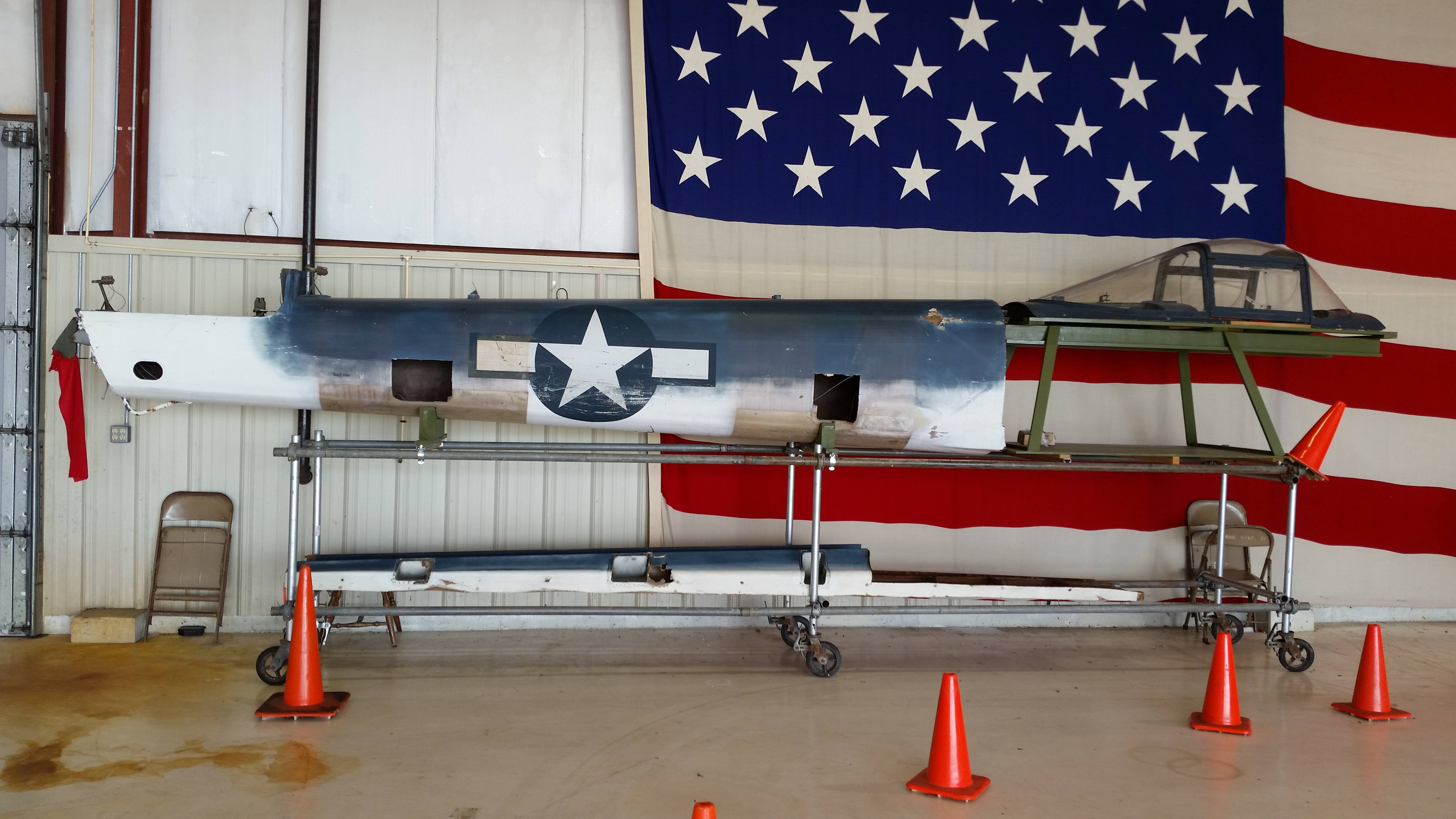
Interstate TDR parts at DeKalb Airport, 2017

In November 2019, Tom Cleveland, then Airport Manager, working with the Prairie State Aviation Museum in Bloomington, was able to secure a TDR-1 fuselage for the DeKalb Taylor Municipal Airport. Roger Keys, historian and DeKalb's local TDR-1 drone expert, currently has wings, a canopy, landing gear, propellers, and numerous other items in his collection. In the future, the airport hopes to reconstruct an entire TDR-1 and have a TDR-1 drone display.

The airport accepted funds from the federal CARES Act during the COVID-19 pandemic to address issues such as personnel staffing and replacing snow equipment.

== Airport events ==
The International Aerobatics Club, a division of the Experimental Aircraft Association, operates a chapter at DeKalb. The chapter celebrates International Aerobatics Day with aerobatics practice and club events.

== Facilities and aircraft ==
KDKB has two runways: runway 2/20 measures 7,026 ft x 100 ft (2,142 m x 30 m), and runway 9/27 measures 4,201 ft x 75 ft (1,280 m x 23 m). All runways are surfaced with asphalt and grooved. Runway 02 is equipped with an instrument landing system (ILS), which allows for precision instrument approaches. GPS approaches can be made to all runways. Runway 2/20 is fully suitable for take-offs of corporate aircraft, such as the Boeing Business Jet, for non-stop flights to Europe and China.

For the 12 month period ending February 28, 2021, there were an average of 74 daily aircraft operations per day: 73% transient general aviation, 23% local general aviation, and 4% air taxi operations. For the same time period, there were 71 aircraft based at this airport: 60 single-engine and 11 multi-engine airplanes.

DeKalb Flight Center, which is the airport's fixed-base operator (FBO), provides a wide range of airport services, including the following: Avgas 100LL and Jet A fuel, aircraft parking (ramp or tiedown), aircraft de-icing, hangars, hangar leasing / sales, GPU / power cart, flight training, charter services, aircraft rental and aircraft parts. Wireless LAN (WLAN) access is available to all DeKalb Flight Center customers.

== Ground transportation ==
While no public transit service is provided directly to the airport, DeKalb Public Transit provides bus service nearby.

== See also ==
- List of airports in Illinois
- DeKalb station
