= ASM-N-5 Gorgon V =

- Type: Air-to-surface missile
- Place of origin: United States

Service history
- Used by: United States Navy

Production history
- Designed: 1950–1953
- Manufacturer: Glenn L. Martin Company
- No. built: 0

Specifications
- Mass: 2,600 pounds (1,200 kg)
- Length: 28 feet 10 inches (8.79 m)
- Wingspan: 10 feet (3.0 m)
- Warhead: Chemical warfare agents
- Engine: None
- Operational range: 34 mi (55 km)
- Flight ceiling: 35,000 feet (11,000 m)
- Maximum speed: Mach 0.95
- Guidance system: Autopilot

The ASM-N-5 Gorgon V was an unpowered air-to-surface missile, developed by the Glenn L. Martin Company during the early 1950s for use by the United States Navy as a chemical weapon delivery vehicle. Developed from the earlier PTV-N-2 Gorgon IV test vehicle, the program was cancelled without any Gorgon Vs seeing service.

== Design and development ==
The Gorgon V project was begun in 1950 to develop an air-to-surface missile capable of dispersing chemical warfare agents over a combat area. Designing of the missile was contracted to the Glenn L. Martin Company, which used the company's earlier PTV-N-2 Gorgon IV ramjet test missile as a basis for the weapon's design. The Gorgon V was to be a long slender missile, with swept wings and conventional tail. The Gorgon IV's ramjet engine, slung beneath the missile's tail, was replaced in the Gorgon V with a X14A aerosol generator, developed by the Edo Aircraft Corporation. (Note: One source suggests that ASM-N-5 was intended to be a ramjet-powered, low-altitude, high-speed weapon.)

Operational use of the Gorgon V was intended to be based on two missiles being carried by a launching aircraft. These would be released at an altitude of 35,000 feet (11,000 m). The Gorgon V would be piloted by autopilot in a high-subsonic dive. (Note: One source indicates that the weapon may have been command-guided based on a television signal from the missile.) Upon reaching an altitude of 500 feet (150 m) or less, as measured by a radar altimeter, the aerosol generator would be activated, dispersing chemical agent over an area of up to 12 mi (20 km) by 5.6 mi (9 km).

Development of the Gorgon V continued throughout the Korean War. In 1953 it was projected that the weapon would be ready for operational service by 1955. Later that year, the Gorgon V was cancelled by the US Navy. It is unknown if any prototypes were constructed before the termination of the project.
