= KA2N Gorgon IIA =

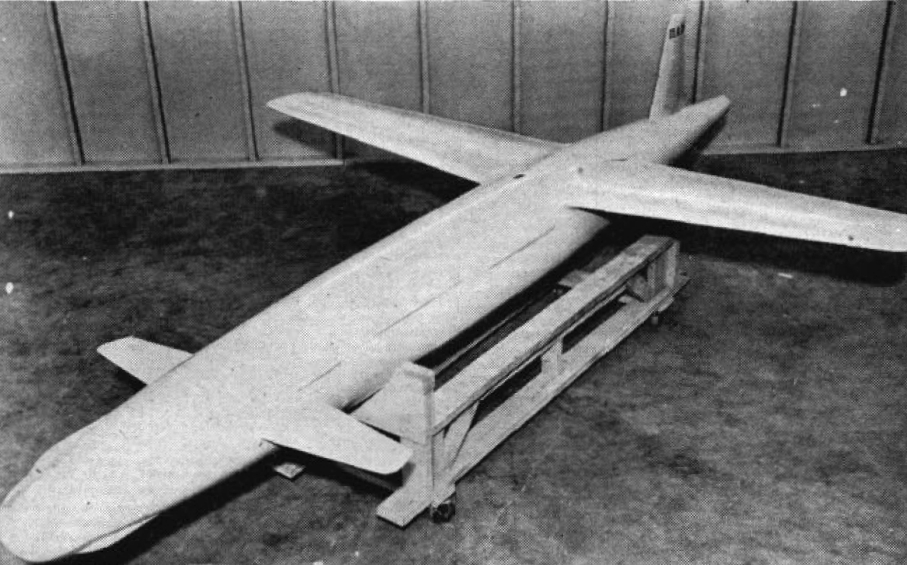
- Gorgon IIA
- Type: Air-to-air missile
- Place of origin: United States

Service history
- In service: 1945–1946
- Used by: United States Navy

Production history
- Designer: Naval Aircraft Modification Unit
- Designed: 1945
- Manufacturer: Singer Manufacturing Company
- No. built: 21

Specifications
- Mass: 971 pounds (440 kg)
- Length: 14 feet 6 inches (4.42 m)
- Wingspan: 11 feet (3.4 m)
- Engine: one Reaction Motors CML2N liquid-fuel rocket 350 lbf (1,600 N) thrust for 130 seconds
- Operational range: 25 miles (40 km)
- Maximum speed: 500 mph (800 km/h)
- Guidance system: Television guidance
- References: Parsch 2005

The KA2N Gorgon IIA – also designated KU2N, CTV-4, and CTV-N-4 – was an air-to-air missile developed by the United States Navy near the end of World War II. Proving a failure in its designed role, it was repurposed as an experimental testbed for missile technology.

== Design and development ==
The Gorgon missile program began in July 1943 at the Naval Aircraft Modification Unit in Warminster, Pennsylvania, and was intended to develop a family of small air-launched missiles for air-to-air and air-to-surface roles. The Gorgon IIA, the baseline design of the family, was of canard configuration, a conventional high-mounted monoplane wing providing lift; the structure was largely of laminated wood, while propulsion was by a Reaction Motors CML2N liquid-fuel rocket, fueled with monoethylamine and nitric acid.

Intended for use intercepting bombers or transport aircraft, the Gorgon IIA was said to be the first American guided missile to be powered by a liquid-fueled rocket. It was fitted with a television guidance system, the pilot of the launching aircraft controlling the missile via radio based on the view from a camera mounted in the nose of the missile.

== Operational history ==
Production of the Gorgon IIA, designated KA2N-1, was ordered from the Singer Manufacturing Company, a sewing machine manufacturer. A mockup of the missile's configuration was approved in March 1944, and by April 1945, orders for 21 Gorgon IIA missiles had been confirmed, all of which would be built. However, initial flight tests of the system, beginning as unpowered glides early in 1945 and proceeding to fully powered guided trials in March 1945, showed that the guidance system was impractical; the closing speeds of the missile and its target were too great for the Gorgon IIA's limited maneuverability to allow the missile's operator to correctly steer the weapon. Despite this difficulty, the Gorgon IIA was the first jet- or rocket-powered radio-controlled aircraft to successfully fly in the United States.

The control issues, combined with the overall immature state of missile technology, led to the Gorgon program being realigned as a testing program; the Gorgon IIA being redesignated in 1946 as KU2N-1, then CTV-4 in 1947, and finally as CTV-N-4 in 1948; the CTV designation reflecting its status as a control test vehicle, although the program was largely concluded by that point. Despite the difficulties with its guidance system, the Gorgon IIA was considered aerodynamically satisfactory.

== Gorgon IIB ==
A turbojet-powered version of the Gorgon II missile, Gorgon IIB, was also ordered, with four examples being contracted for; the project was cancelled due to a lack of suitable engines.

== Surviving aircraft ==
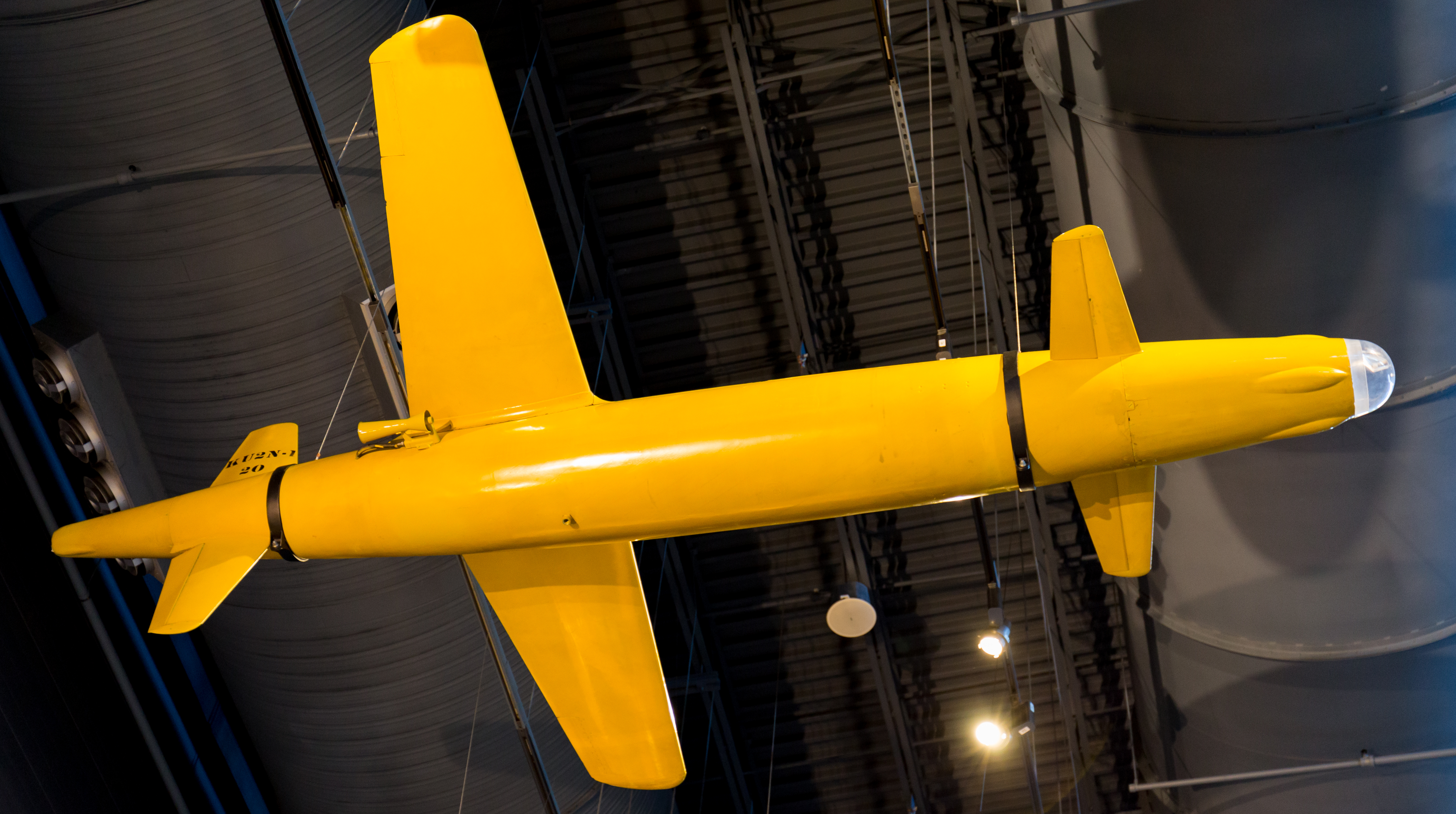
Gorgon IIA at the Udvar-Hazy Center

Very few Gorgon IIAs survived the testing program. One was donated by the U.S. Navy to the National Air Museum (now the National Air and Space Museum) in 1951; it is currently on display at the Steven F. Udvar-Hazy Center.
