= Project Gorgon =

Gorgon
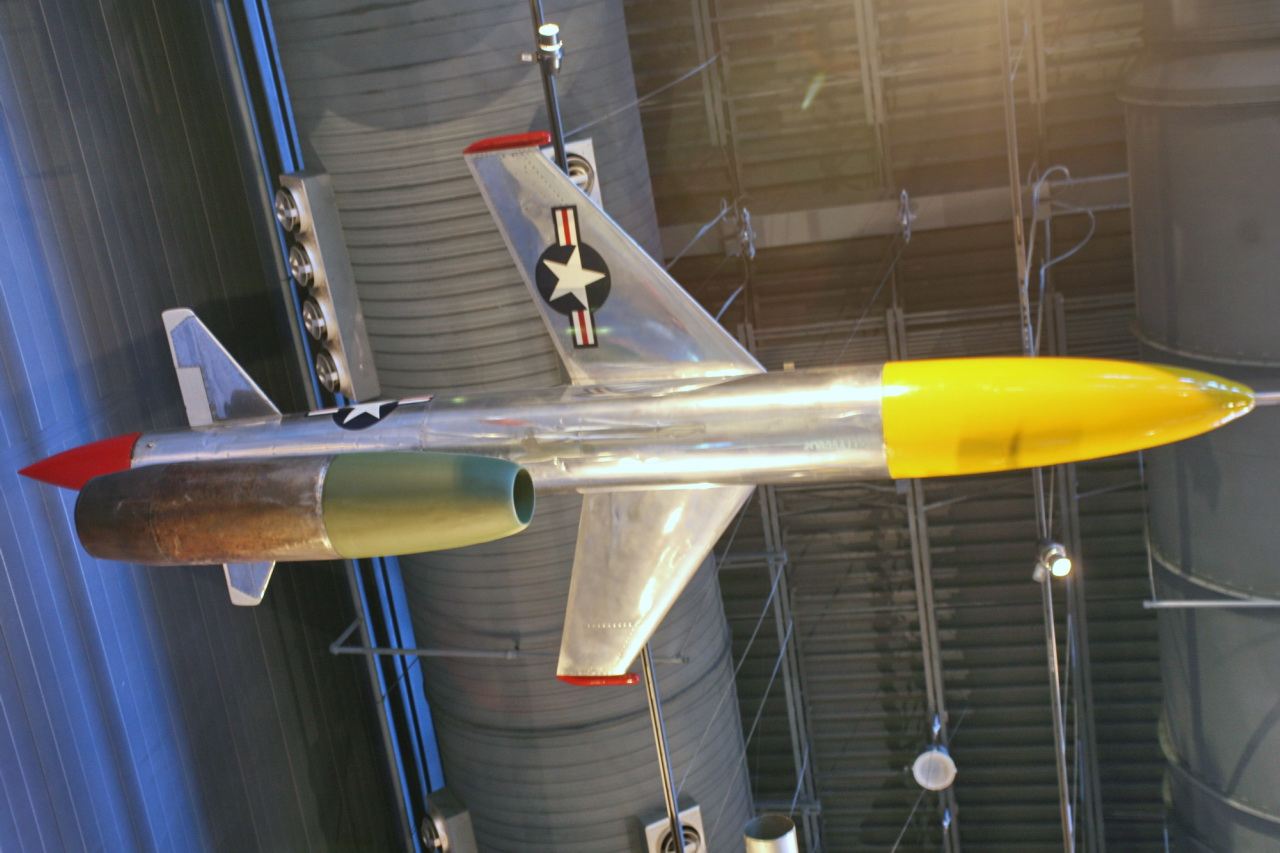
- PTV-N-2 Gorgon IV in the Steven F. Udvar-Hazy Center
- Type: Ground-to-ground missile
- Place of origin: United States

Production history
- Designer: United States
- Designed: 1943
- Produced: from 1943 to 1953

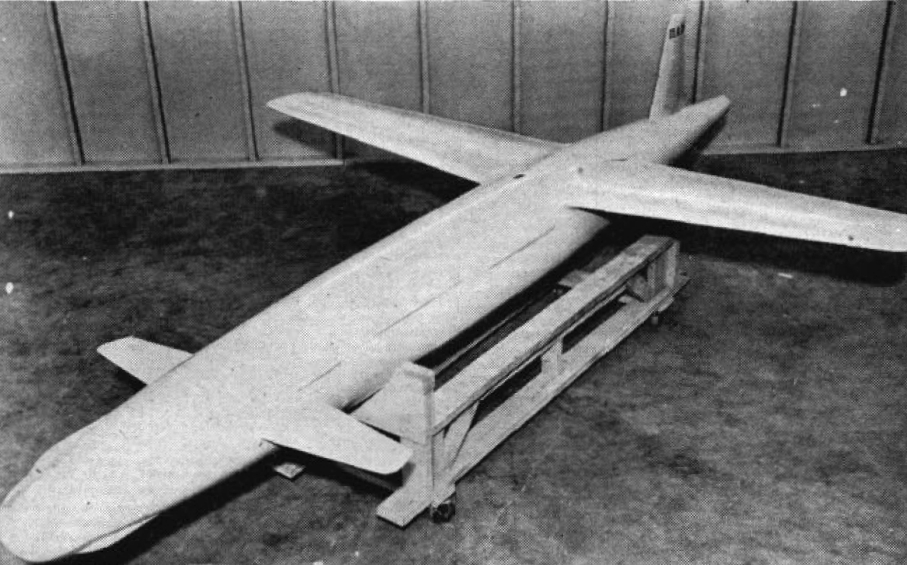
A Gorgon IIA in 1947

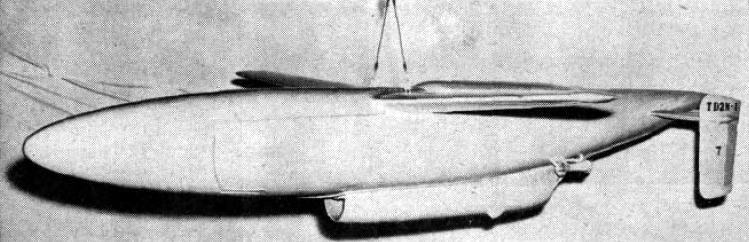
A TD2N-1 (Gorgon IIIB) target drone

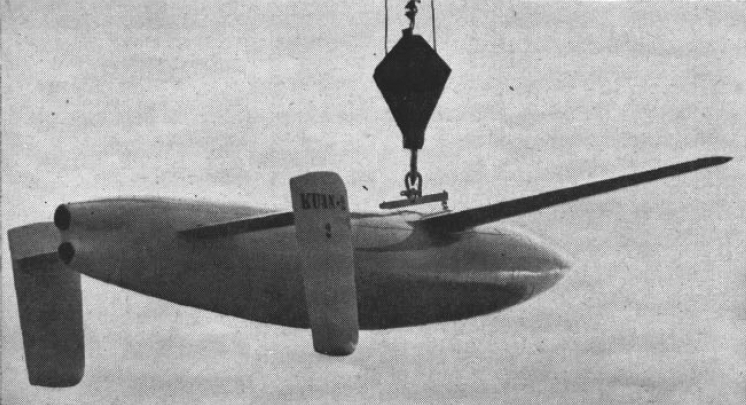
The Gorgon IIIC

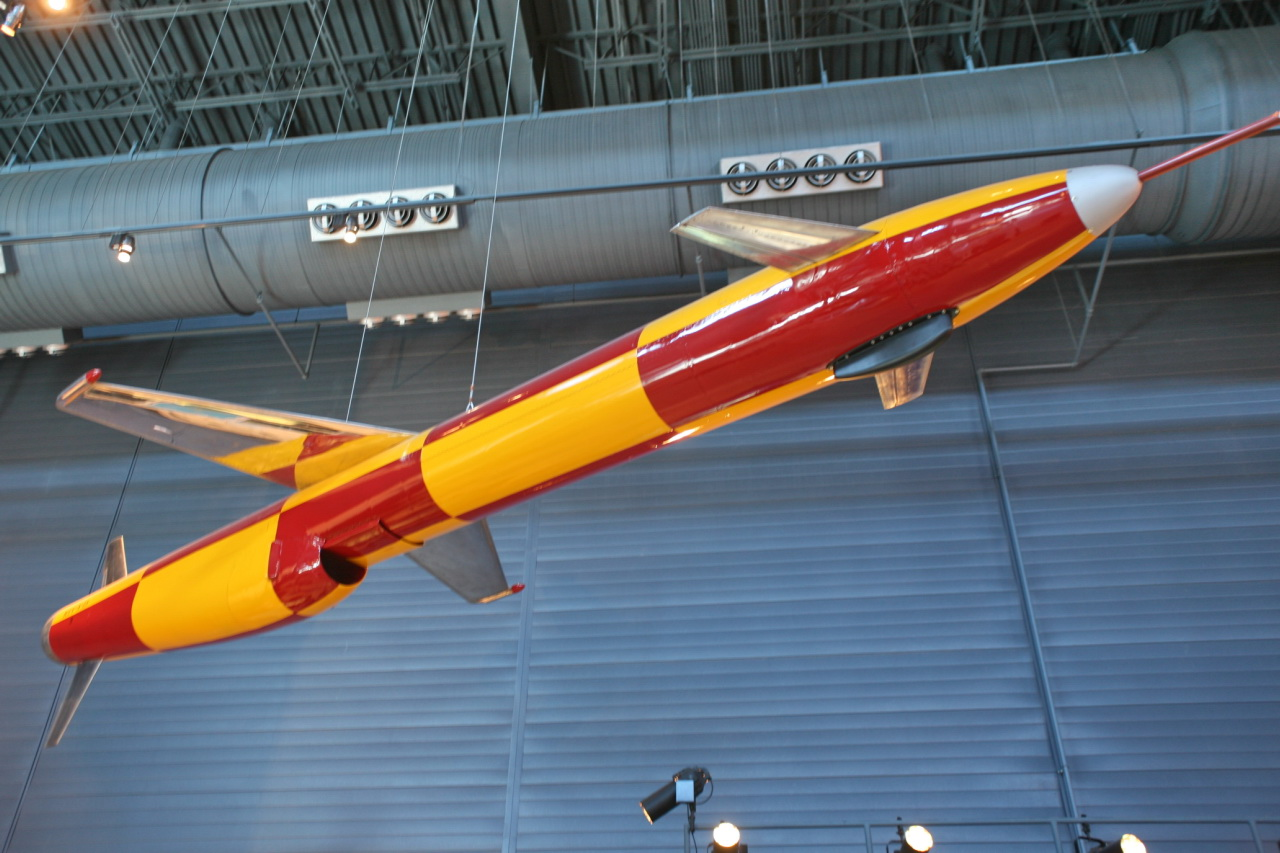
RTV-N-15 Pollux in the Steven F. Udvar-Hazy Center

The Gorgon missile family was a series of experimental air-to-air, air-to-surface, and surface-to-surface missiles developed by the United States Navy's Naval Aircraft Modification Unit between 1943 and 1953. The immaturity of the technology involved meant that none of the Gorgon missiles achieved operational service, however they were extensively used in the development of guided missile controls and guidance technologies.

== History ==
In the late 1930s, then-Commander Delmer S. Fahrney proposed that an "aerial torpedo" be developed for the purpose of intercepting bomber aircraft; while in 1940 the U.S. Navy Bureau of Aeronautics investigated the concept, it was only in May 1943, with the advent of practical jet and rocket engines, that the United States Navy initiated the Gorgon missile program, headquartered at the Naval Aircraft Modification Unit (later Naval Air Development Station) in Pennsylvania.

The original design for Gorgon called for a turbojet-powered missile of approximately 660 pounds (300 kg), capable of reaching 510 mph (820 km/h) and intended for use in destroying bombers or transport aircraft. Several guidance options were considered, including television guidance using a camera in the missile's nose and steering commands sent via radio, active radar homing, or infrared homing. As 1943 progressed the Gorgon project diversified, and in October 1943 aerodynamic studies and delays in the development of suitable small turbojet engines led to the decision being made to trial two different designs: the Gorgon II, with a canard configuration, and the Gorgon III, configured as a small conventional aircraft. Each would be equipped with three different engine types; the 'A' model would be rocket-powered; 'B' powered by a turbojet engine, and 'C' would be equipped with a pulsejet engine. Neither Gorgon IIB or Gorgon IIIB would be built due to limitations of turbojet technology – although a target drone derived from Gorgon III was produced in small numbers – and Gorgon IIIC was changed to a twin-rocket configuration. In May 1945, the Gorgon IV, an air-to-surface missile powered by a ramjet engine, was added to the program.

Gorgon IIA was successfully flown in March 1945; it was stated to be the first jet- or rocket-powered radio-controlled aircraft to successfully fly in the United States. However limitations of the guidance system – project officer Molt Taylor expressed concerns about the capability of the human mind to process information quickly enough, given the speed at which the missiles flew, to react correctly to situations – and other technological issues meant that by late 1945, with the end of World War II, the production contracts for the air-launched Gorgon variants were changed to a pure technology-demonstration-and-development program; this was generally considered successful. The surface-launched Gorgon IIC had been planned for extensive use in Operation Downfall, the invasion of Japan; orders for a hundred missiles were placed with the Singer Manufacturing Company, however the end of the war following the atomic bombings of Hiroshima and Nagasaki resulted in the cancellation of the production contracts and Gorgon IIC also becoming a research-only project.

The final variant of the Gorgon family to be produced was the Pollux, a pulsejet test vehicle based on the Gorgon IIC, which was flown between 1949 and 1951. However, in 1950, the onset of the Cold War and the hot war in Korea led to the proposal to develop the Gorgon IV airframe into a chemical-weapons dispenser vehicle, designated Gorgon V; work on Gorgon V continued until late 1953, when the program was cancelled, the Gorgon program drawing to a close.

== Variants ==
Name	First designation	Second designation	Third designation	Fourth designation	Number built	Type
Gorgon IIA	KA2N-1	KU2N-1	CTV-4	CTV-N-4	21	Air-to-air; canard layout, single-rocket power.
Gorgon IIB	–	–	–	–	0	Air-to-air; canard layout, turbojet power.
Gorgon IIC	KGN-1	KUN-1	CTV-2	CTV-N-2	?	Surface-to-surface; canard layout, pulsejet power. Eight TD2N-1/KD2N-1 target drones also built.
Gorgon IIIA	KA3N-1	KU3N-1	CTV-6	CTV-N-6	34	Air-to-air; conventional layout, single-rocket power.
Gorgon IIIB	TD2N-1	KDN-1	–	–	19	Air-to-air; conventional layout, turbojet power. Unbuilt as designed, produced as target drone.
Gorgon IIIC	KA3N-2	KU3N-2	RTV-4	RTV-N-4	12	Air-to-air; conventional layout, twin-rocket power.
Gorgon IV	KUM-1	PTV-2	PTV-N-2	KDM-1	19	Air-to-surface; conventional layout, ramjet power.
Gorgon V	ASM-N-5	–	–	–	0	Air-to-surface; conventional layout, unpowered.
Pollux	RTV-N-15	–	–	–	?	Test vehicle; canard layout, pulsejet power.

== Bibliography ==
- Friedman, Norman (1982). U.S. Naval Weapons - Every Gun, Missile, Mine, and Torpedo Used by the U.S. Navy from 1883 to the Present Day. Annapolis, MD: Naval Institute Press. ISBN 978-0-870-21735-7.
- Gunston, Bill (1979). The Illustrated Encyclopedia of the World's Rockets & Missiles. London: Crescent Books. ISBN 978-0-517-26870-4.
- Ordway, Frederick Ira; Wakeford, Ronald C. (1960). International Missile and Spacecraft Guide. New York: McGraw-Hill. ASIN B000MAEGVC.
- Parsch, Andreas (4 January 2005). "Martin ASM-N-5 Gorgon V (and other NAMU Gorgon variants)". Directory of U.S. Military Rockets and Missiles - Appendix 1: Early Missiles and Drones - ASM-N-5. Designation-Systems.
- Trimble, William F. (1990). Wings for the Navy - A History of the Naval Aircraft Factory, 1917–1956. Annapolis, MD: Naval Institute Press. ISBN 978-0-870-21663-3.
- White, Maxwell (1991). An Interpretative History of the Pacific Missile Test Center - The Genesis, Road to Point Mugu, 1936–1946. Point Mugu, CA: Pacific Missile Test Center. ASIN B00010AIGU.
- Yenne, Bill (2006). Secret Gadgets and Strange Gizmos: High-Tech (and Low-Tech) Innovations of the U.S. Military. Minneapolis, MN: Zenith Press. ISBN 978-0-760-32115-7.
