= NAMU KDN Gorgon =

KDN Gorgon
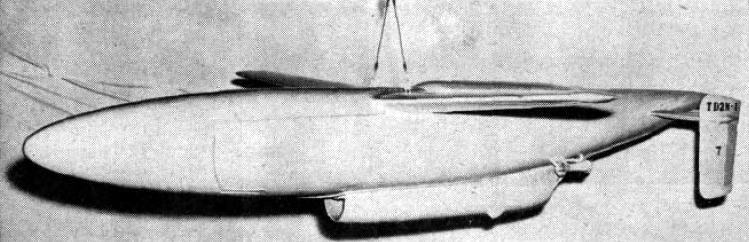
- A TD2N (KDN) on display in 1947

General information
- Type: Target drone
- National origin: United States
- Manufacturer: Naval Aircraft Modification Unit
- Primary user: United States Navy
- Number built: 19

History
- First flight: 27 June 1945
- Developed from: Gorgon IIIB missile

The Naval Aircraft Modification Unit KDN Gorgon, originally designated TD2N, is an early jet-powered target drone developed by the Bureau of Aeronautics and constructed by the Naval Aircraft Modification Unit for use by the United States Navy. First flown near the end of World War II, it was cancelled due to problems with its engine in 1946.

== Development ==
The TD2N-1 was a development of the Gorgon IIIB missile, designed in 1943 by the U.S. Navy Bureau of Aeronautics for use against heavy bomber aircraft and ground targets using optical guidance. The Gorgon IIIB was cancelled due to its engine proving unsatisfactory; however, a version simplified for use as a target drone was developed starting in November 1944. Built by the Navy's Naval Aircraft Modification Unit, located in the former Brewster Aeronautical Corporation factory in Johnsville, Pennsylvania, the TD2N-1 was of conventional design, with a monoplane wing and twin-tail configuration; to reduce cost and pressure on strategic materials, it was constructed primarily of wood with some portions of the fuselage being fabric-covered. The aircraft was powered by a Westinghouse 9.5 – later redesignated J32 – turbojet engine mounted beneath the airframe. The drone was controlled by a combination of preset navigation and radio command guidance, and was equipped with a parachute recovery system to allow the aircraft to be reused if it was not shot down.

== Operational history ==
The first drop tests of the TD2N-1 took place in June 1945; on 27 June, the first powered flight was attempted, but the aircraft crashed following a failure of the radio command system. On 17 August, the TD2N-1 completed its first successful powered flight. Testing at Naval Air Engineering Station Lakehurst continued following the end of World War II; in early 1946, the aircraft was redesignated KDN-1 as the Navy rationalized its designation system, however in March of that year the program was cancelled because of continuing development issues with the Westinghouse engine.

== Surviving aircraft ==
One KDN-1 survives, having been donated by the United States Navy to the National Air and Space Museum in 1965; it remains in storage awaiting restoration.

== Specifications ==
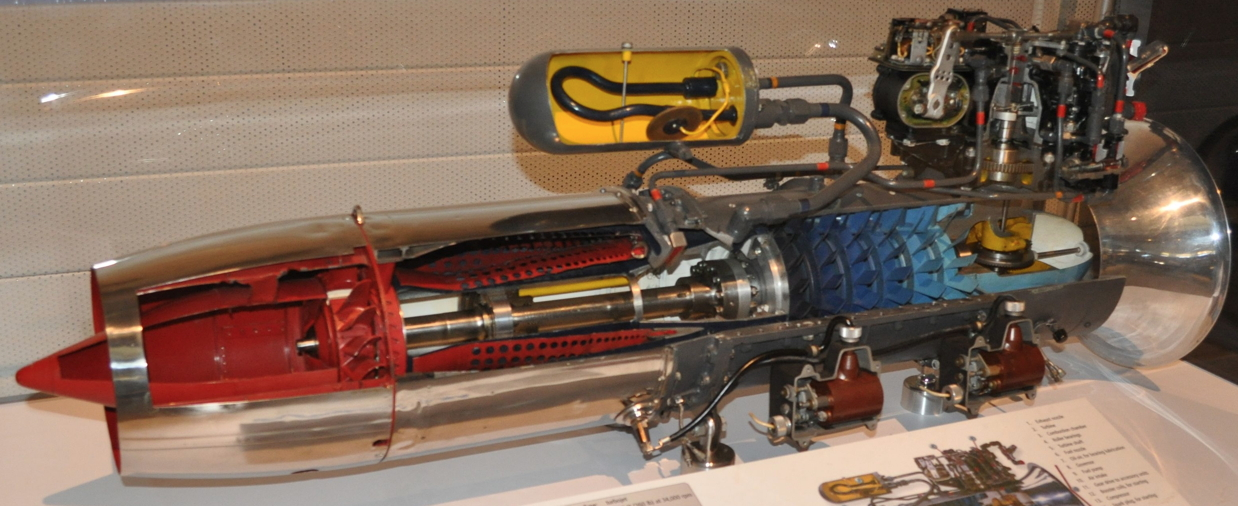
A Westinghouse J32 engine on cutaway display

Data from NASM

General characteristics

- Crew: None
- Length: 16 ft 3 in (4.95 m)
- Wingspan: 10 ft 9 in (3.28 m)
- Height: 4 ft 2 in (1.27 m)
- Wing area: 27.8 sq ft (2.58 m^{2})
- Powerplant: 1 × Westinghouse J32 turbojet, 260 lbf (1.2 kN) thrust

Performance

- Maximum speed: 500 mph (800 km/h, 430 kn)

== See also ==
Related development

- Gorgon (missile family)

Aircraft of comparable role, configuration, and era

- Curtiss KD2C Skeet
- Globe KD2G Firefly
- McDonnell TD2D Katydid

Related lists

- List of unmanned aerial vehicles
