= Naval Air Warfare Center Warminster =

Airport in the United States of America

Naval Air Warfare Center, Warminster
- Warminster, Pennsylvania in United States
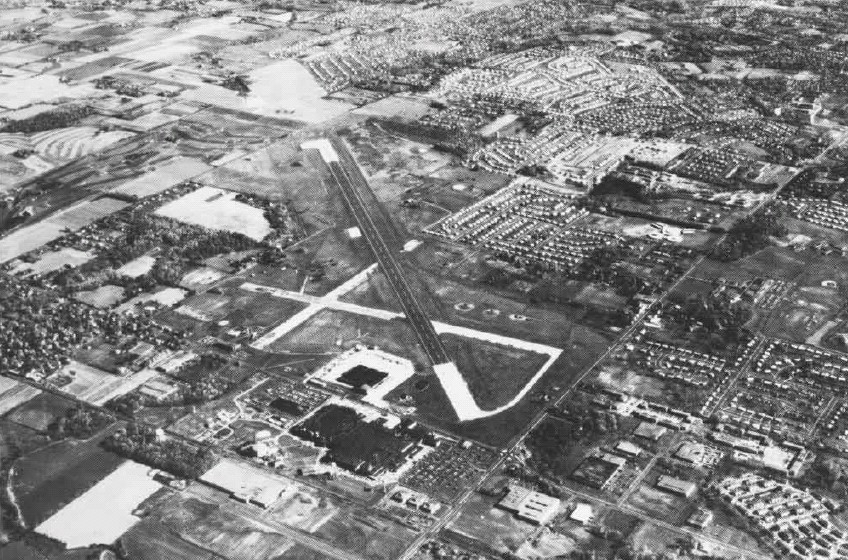
- Aerial view of the NADC in the early 1970s

Site information
- Type: Naval Air Station
- Owner: United States Department of War
- Operator: United States Navy
- Condition: Demolished; land repurposed
- Other site facilities: Naval Air Material Center (NAMC)

Location
- Coordinates: 40.2001°N 75.0599°W

Site history
- Built for: originally the Brewster Aeronautical Corporation
- In use: 1944-1996
- Fate: Demolished; land repurposed

Airfield information
- Identifiers: IATA: NJP, ICAO: KNJP
- Elevation: 375 feet (114 m) AMSL
Runways
Direction	Length and surface
9/27	8,000 feet (2,438 m) Asphalt, concrete

NAWC, Aircraft Division, Warminster (Johnsville Naval Air Development Center)
- Location within Pennsylvania
- 40.19295°N 75.07532°W
- Location: Warminster and Ivyland, Pennsylvania

Naval Air Warfare Center Warminster (IATA: ~~NJP~~, ICAO: ~~KNJP~~) was a U.S. Navy military installation located in Warminster, Pennsylvania and Ivyland, Pennsylvania. For most of its existence (1949–1993), the base was known as the Naval Air Development Center (NADC) Warminster, but it has also been referred to as Johnsville Naval Air Development Center, NADC Johnsville or simply, Johnsville.

== History ==
=== Early history ===
In 1944, the US Navy took over the lease of the property of the Brewster Aeronautical Corporation following a period of mismanagement of the company and its inability to meet Navy contracts for the war effort. The Brewster Buccaneer dive bomber was produced by Brewster at this location, which was known as Brewster Field.

Following the US Navy takeover, the site was known as the Naval Aircraft Modification Unit (NAMU). It was considered a branch of the Naval Air Material Center (NAMC). It was a modification center for fleet aircraft before they were sent to the fleet. Wing panels for PBYs were manufactured here and assembled on planes at Mustin Field at the Philadelphia Naval Aircraft factory. The Gorgon missile and TD2N target drone were manufactured at the plant. The Chance Vought F4U Corsair was modified here, with the Brewster F3A version being built here during WWII.

After a brief period as a Naval Air Development Station (NADS), the site became a Naval Air Development Center (NADC). It was renamed "Naval Air Development Center (NADC) Warminster" on August 1, 1949. The facility played an important role in Project Mercury.

As of January 1993, the facility name was changed from NADC to NAWC, becoming "Naval Air Warfare Center Warminster".

=== Base closure ===
The base was closed by the federal government Base Realignment and Closure action in the 1990s and most of its operations were transferred to Naval Air Station Patuxent River in Lexington Park, Maryland. In 1992, as part of the BRAC, the NADC Navigation Department (Code 40) was transferred to NCCOSC (Naval Command, Control and Ocean Surveillance Center) Research, Test and Evaluation (RDT&E) Division San Diego, CA. NRaD Warminster Detachment ultimately relocated to San Diego when the base closed on 30 September 1996.

NADC Code 40 and subsequently NRaD Warminster Detachment Code 30 operated several facilities including the GPS Central Engineering Activity (CEA) and a large, dome-shaped, underground facility (Inertial Navigation Facility). This facility performed the engineering functions associated with Inertial Navigational Equipment, including gyroscopes, used for inertial navigation systems on military aircraft and submarines. While the GPS CEA currently operates out of San Diego, CA, the underground inertial facility is maintained and operated by the Penn State Applied Research Lab (ARL).

The 8,000-foot-long (2,400 m) runway at the base was able to accommodate the C-5 Galaxy military cargo aircraft.

=== Today ===
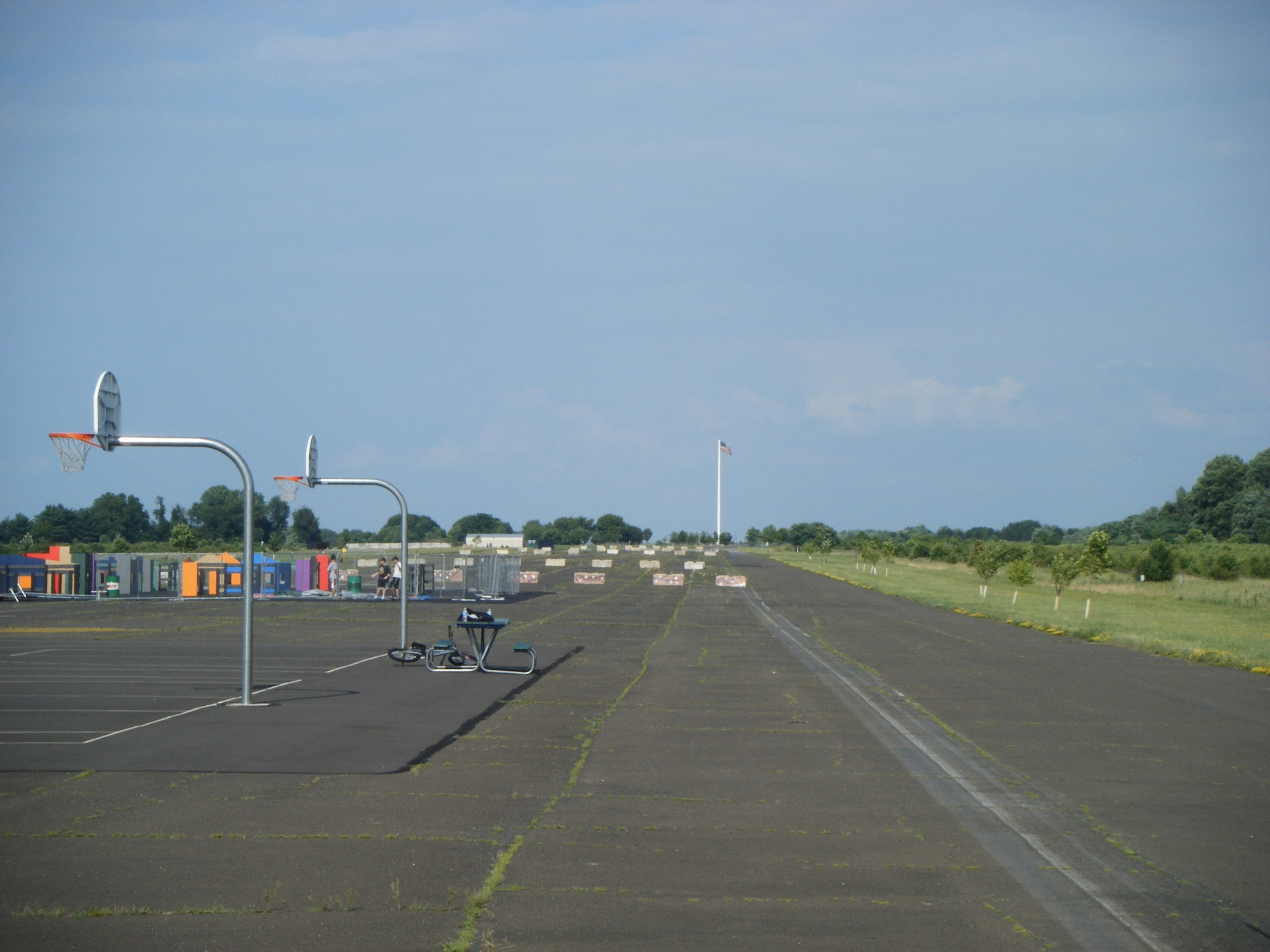
The former runway of Naval Air Warfare Center Warminster is now part of Warminster Community Park and contains basketball courts and a children's area called Safety Town

The former Center is now home to an industrial park, Warminster Community Park, a housing development, the new Bucks County morgue crime lab, Ann's Choice, a senior citizens' housing complex, a Costco and the IHG hotel "Holiday Inn Express". Stormtracker6, the Doppler weather radar for WPVI is also located there.

While once part of the EPA's superfund list, the US Navy has completed all cleanup activities at the former base.

In 2014, the Warminster Municipal Authority issued a public notice stating that groundwater contamination had been identified on and in the area of the former NAWC site and shut down two supply wells as a result of the contamination until further notice. The water is contaminated with perfluorooctanesulfonic acid. Contamination was detected in other wells but not above the EPA's provisional Health Advisory Level.

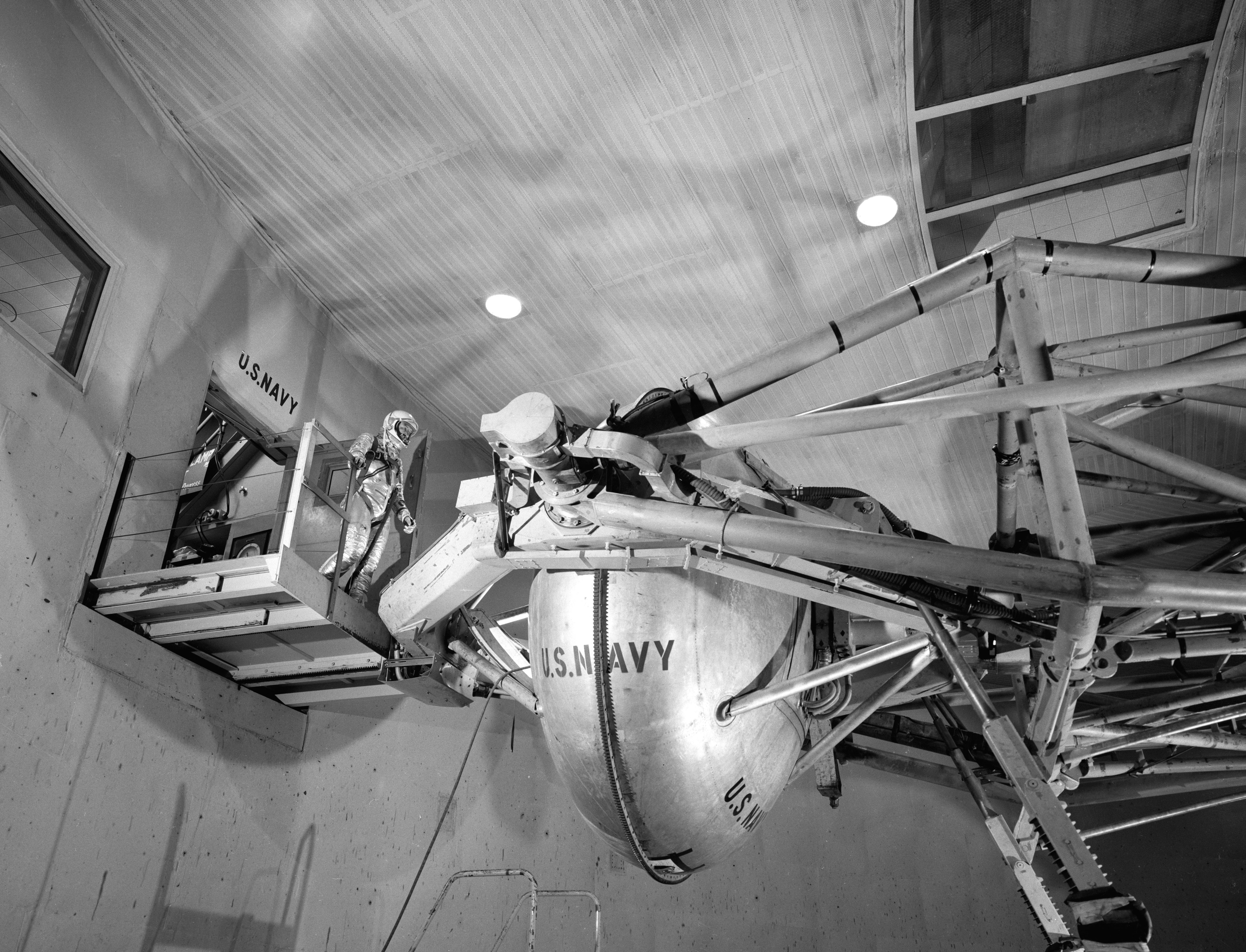
U.S. astronaut Walter M. Schirra Jr. prepares to enter the gondola of the human centrifuge at Johnsville in 1960.

== Human centrifuge ==
Johnsville possessed the world's largest human centrifuge, the Dynamic Flight Simulator (DFS). Capable of spinning a person to at least 16g (42g max, 19g/s onset), it was used for astronaut training. The centrifuge was later used for flight simulation where it could simulate six degrees of freedom with g loading. The F-14 flat spin on takeoff issue was investigated and resolved on the DFS centrifuge. Later endeavors included supine seat experiments, the G-Tolerance Improvement Program (GTIP), and F/A-18 simulation. The DFS centrifuge building (formerly building 70) has been refurbished as a museum, office space, and a theater.

== See also ==
- Abandoned & Little-Known Airfields
