= History of unmanned aerial vehicles =

History of development and use of UAVs

A BQM-74 Chukar III, turbojet-powered aerial target drone

Unmanned aerial vehicles (UAVs) include both autonomous (capable of operating without human input) drones and remotely piloted vehicles (RPVs). A UAV is capable of controlled, sustained level flight and is powered by a jet, reciprocating, or electric engine. In the twenty-first century, technology reached a point of sophistication that the UAV is now being given a greatly expanded role in many areas of aviation.

A UAV differs from a cruise missile in that a UAV is intended to be recovered after its mission, while a cruise missile impacts its target. A military UAV may carry and fire munitions on board, while a cruise missile is a munition. Loitering munitions are a class of unmanned aircraft intermediate between them.

== Early development ==
=== Austrian incendiary balloon attack on Venice ===
The earliest recorded use of an unmanned aerial vehicle for warfighting occurred in July 1849, serving as a balloon carrier (the precursor to the aircraft carrier) is the first offensive use of air power in naval aviation. Austrian forces besieging Venice attempted to float some 200 incendiary balloons each carrying a 24- to 30-pound bomb that was to be dropped from the balloon with a time fuse over the besieged city. The balloons were launched mainly from land; however, some were also launched from the Austrian ship SMS Vulcano. The Austrians used smaller pilot balloons to determine the correct fuse settings. At least one bomb fell in the city; however, due to the wind changing after launch, most of the balloons missed their target, and some drifted back over Austrian lines and the launching ship Vulcano.

=== World War I ===
The first pilotless aircraft were built during World War I. From a suggestion that A. M. Low’s expertise in early television and radio technology be used to develop a remotely controlled pilotless aircraft to attack the Zeppelins a remarkable succession of British drone weapons in 1917 and 1918 evolved. Designers from Sopwith Aviation and its contractor Rushton Proctor, de Havilland and the Royal Aircraft Factory all became involved. They were all designed to use Low's radio control system developed at the Royal Flying Corps secret Experimental Works at Feltham. Of these Low confirmed that Geoffrey de Havilland’s monoplane was the one that flew under control on 21 March 1917. Low is known as '"father of radio guidance systems" and in 1976 Low was inducted into the International Space Hall of Fame. Alternatively, John Taylor suggested Low was the ‘Father of the Remotely Piloted Vehicle’.

Soon after, on September 12, the Hewitt-Sperry Automatic Airplane, otherwise known as the "flying bomb" made its first flight, demonstrating the concept of an unmanned aircraft. They were intended for use as "aerial torpedoes," an early version of today's cruise missiles. Control was achieved using gyroscopes developed by Elmer Sperry of the Sperry Gyroscope Company.

Later, in November 1917, the Automatic Airplane was flown for representatives of the US Army. This led the army to commission a project to build an "aerial torpedo", resulting in the Kettering Bug which first flew in 1918. While the Bug's revolutionary technology was successful, it was not in time to fight in the war, which ended before it could be fully developed and deployed.

=== Interwar period ===
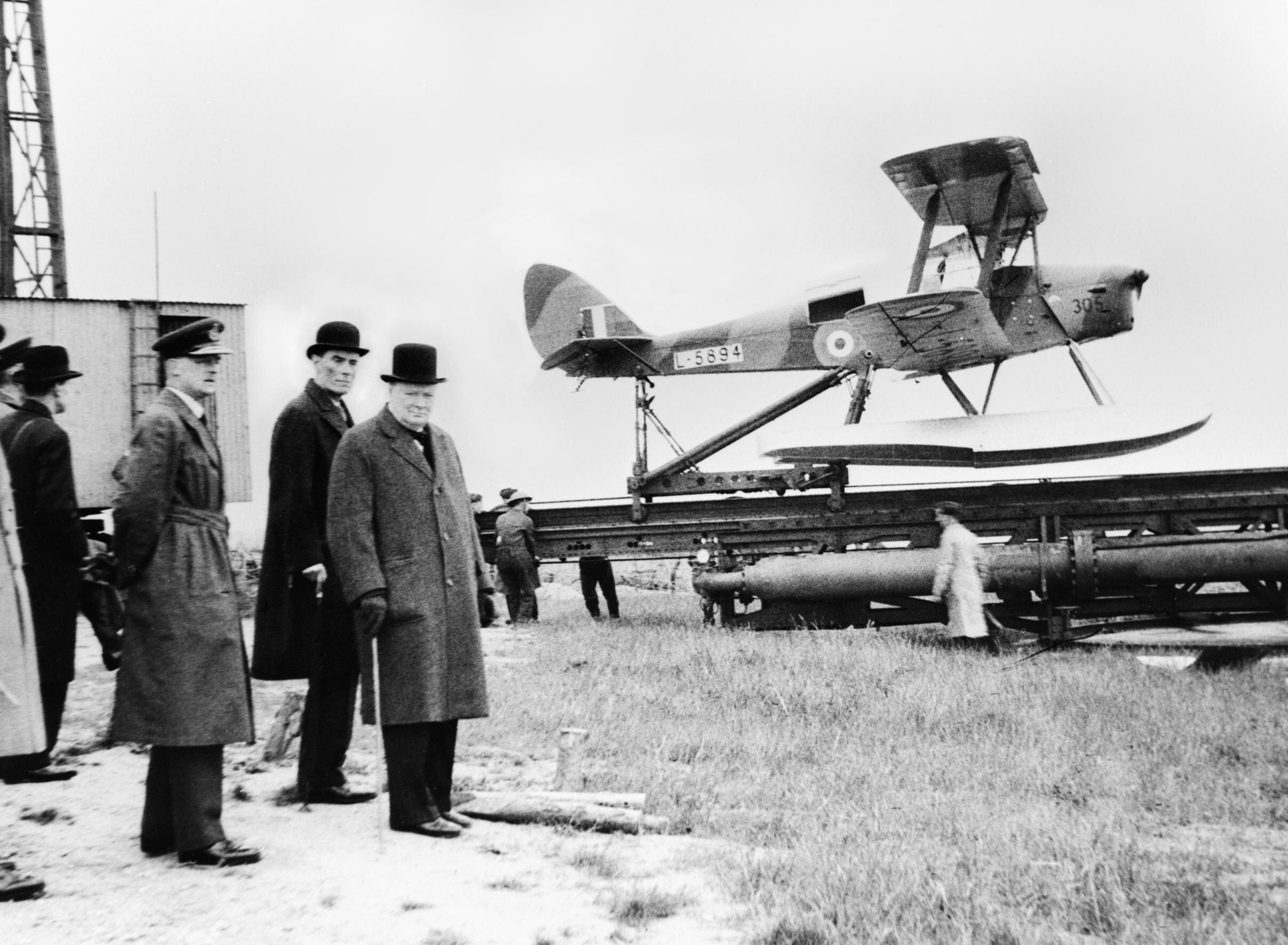
Winston Churchill, David Margesson and others wait to watch the launch of a de Havilland Queen Bee target drone, 6 June 1941

After World War I, three Standard E-1s were converted to drones. The Larynx was an early cruise missile in the form of a small monoplane aircraft that could be launched from a warship and flown under autopilot; the Royal Navy tested it between 1927 and 1929. The early successes of pilotless aircraft led to the development of radio controlled pilotless target-aircraft in Britain and the US in the 1930s. In 1931 the British developed the Fairey Queen radio-controlled target from the Fairey IIIF floatplane, building a small batch of three, and in 1935 followed up this experiment by producing larger numbers of another RC target, the "DH.82B Queen Bee", derived from the de Havilland Tiger Moth biplane trainer. The name of "Queen Bee" allegedly led to the use of the term "drone" for pilotless aircraft, particularly when they are radio-controlled. During this period, the U.S. Navy, continuing work that reached back to 1917, also experimented with radio-controlled aircraft. In 1936 the head of US Navy research group used the term "DRONE" to designate radio-controlled aerial targets. From 1929 Hungarian scientist Kálmán Tihanyi worked on television guidance for defense applications, building prototypes of a camera for remotely-guided aircraft in London for the British Air Ministry, and later adapting it for the Italian Navy. In 1929, Tihanyi invented the first infrared-sensitive (night-vision) electronic television-camera for anti-aircraft defense in Britain. The solutions of the technology that Tihanyi depicted in his 1929 patent became so influential that American UAV-producing companies still used many of its solutions even half a century later, until the mid-1980s.

Subsequent British "drones" included the Airspeed Queen Wasp, the Miles Queen Martinet, and the US-supplied Curtiss Queen Seamew. After WW II these would be replaced by the jet-powered Anglo-Australian GAF Jindivik.

The Soviets tested pilotless munitions-delivery in 1935-1939.

== World War II ==
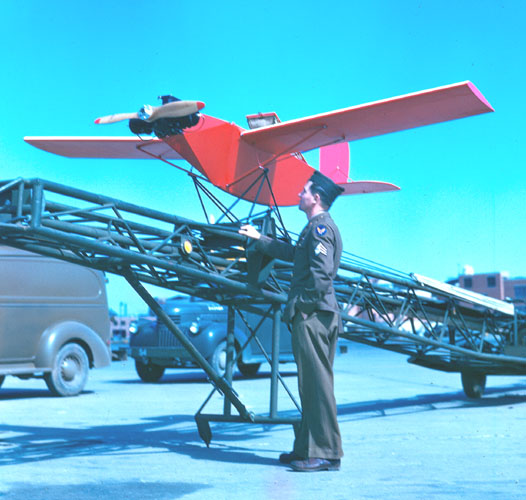
A Radioplane OQ-3 and its launcher, Wright Field, October 1945

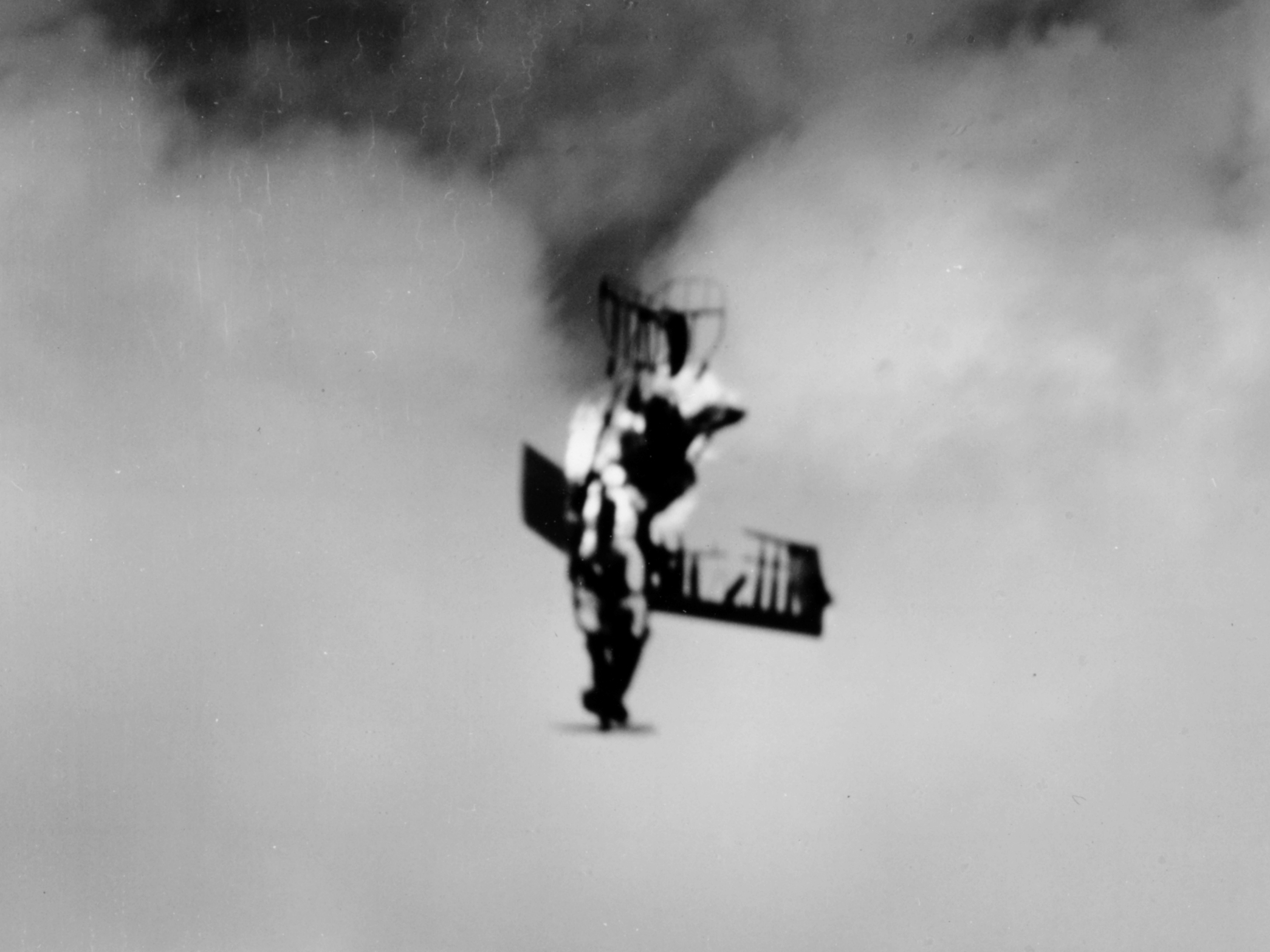
A US Navy OQ-2 shot down by the USS Makin Island during a gunnery exercise off Wakanoura, Japan (October 1945)

=== Reginald Denny and the Radioplane ===
The first large-scale production, purpose-built drone was the product of Reginald Denny. He served with the British Royal Flying Corps during World War I, and after the war, in 1919, he returned to the United States to resume his career in Hollywood. Denny was a successful leading man and between acting jobs, he pursued his interest in radio control model aircraft in the 1930s opening a shop.

The shop evolved into the "Radioplane Company". Denny believed that low-cost RC aircraft would be very useful for training anti-aircraft gunners, and in 1935 he demonstrated a prototype target drone, the RP-1, to the US Army. Denny then bought a design from Walter Righter in 1938 and began marketing it to hobbyists as the "Dennymite", and demonstrated it to the Army as the RP-2, and after modifications as the RP-3 and RP-4 in 1939. In 1940, Denny and his partners won an Army contract for their radio controlled RP-4, which became the Radioplane OQ-2. They manufactured nearly fifteen thousand drones for the Army during World War II.

The true inventor of a radio-controlled aircraft that could fly out of sight was Edward M. Sorensen as evidenced by his US patents. His invention was the first to be able to know from a ground terminal what the airplane was doing, such as climbing, altitude, banking, direction, rpm and other instrumentation. Without these patents the early radio-controlled aircraft could only operate within visual sight of the ground pilot.

=== Aerial torpedoes ===
The US Navy began experimenting with radio-controlled aircraft during the 1930s as well, resulting in the Curtiss N2C-2 drone in 1937. The N2C-2 was remotely controlled from another aircraft, called a TG-2. N2C-2 anti-aircraft target drones were in service by 1938.

The US Army Air Forces (USAAF) adopted the N2C-2 concept in 1939. Obsolescent aircraft were put into service as "A-series" anti-aircraft target drones. Since the "A" code would be also used for "Attack" aircraft, later "full-sized" targets would be given the "PQ" designation. USAAF acquired hundreds of Culver "PQ-8" target drones, which were radio-controlled versions of the Culver Cadet two-seat light civil aircraft, and thousands of the improved Culver PQ-14 Cadet derivative of the PQ-8. The US also used RC aircraft, including modified B-17 Flying Fortress and B-24 Liberator heavy bombers in Aphrodite and Anvil operations in combat on a small scale during World War II as very large aerial torpedoes, though with no great success and the loss of aircrew including Joseph P. Kennedy Jr.

The "TDN-1" was an unmanned aerial vehicle that was developed for use in 1940. The TDN was capable of delivering a 1,000-pound bomb but never saw operational duty.

The Naval Aircraft Factory assault drone "Project Fox" installed an RCA television camera in the drone and a six-inch television screen in the TG-2 control aircraft in 1941. In April 1942 the assault drone successfully delivered a demonstration torpedo attack on a US destroyer at a range of 20 miles from the TG-2 control aircraft. Another assault drone was successfully crashed into a target moving at eight knots. The Navy Bureau of Aeronautics then proposed a television-assisted remote control assault drone program of 162 control planes and 1,000 assault drones. Disagreements arose within the Navy concerning the relative advantages of the proposed program for full-scale combat implementation versus a small-scale combat test with minimum aircraft resource expenditure which might reveal the concept to the enemy and allow development of countermeasures prior to full production. Assault drones remained an unproven concept in the minds of military planners through major allied advances of 1944. Utilization was limited to a 4-drone attack on a beached Japanese merchant ship in the Russell Islands at the end of July followed by expenditure of 46 drones in the northern Solomon Islands. Two hits and two near-misses were scored on the stationary ship. Several of the later drones failed to reach their targets, but most were effective.

=== Pulsejets ===
The V-1 flying bomb was the first cruise missile ever built. It was built in the Peenemünde Army Research Center and first tested in 1942. The V-1 was intended to target London and was massively fired, achieving more than one hundred launches a day. The V-1 was launched from a rail system to achieve the speed needed to operate its pulsejet engine and would achieve a 250 kilometers radius, at one point flying at 640 km/h.

McDonnell built a pulsejet-powered target, the TD2D-1 Katydid, later the KDD-1 and then KDH-1. It was an air-launched cigar-shaped machine with a straight mid-mounted wing, and a vee tail straddling the pulsejet engine. The Katydid was developed in mid-war and a small number were put into service with the US Navy.

After the war, the Navy obtained small numbers of another pulsejet-powered target, the Curtiss KD2C Skeet series. It was another cigar-shaped machine, with the pulsejet in the fuselage and intake in the nose. It featured straight, low-mounted wings with tip tanks, and a triple-fin tail.

=== Balloons ===
Japan launched long distance attacks on the US Mainland using their Fu-Go unmanned balloons. They used the high-altitude jet stream and a novel ballast system to reach the northwestern US. Though intended to cause forest fires and widespread panic, their impact was not significant.

== Cold War ==
=== Target drone evolution ===
In the post-World War II period, Radioplane followed up the success of the OQ-2 target drone with another very successful series of piston-powered target drones, what would become known as the Basic Training Target (BTT) family (the BTT designation wasn't created until the 1980s, but is used here as a convenient way to resolve the tangle of designations), including the OQ-19/KD2R Quail and the MQM-33/MQM-36 Shelduck. The BTTs remained in service for the rest of the 20th century. The first target drone converted to the battlefield unmanned aerial photo reconnaissance mission was a version of the MQM-33 conversion for the US Army in the mid-1950s designated the RP-71, later re-designated the MQM-57 Falconer.

The US military acquired a number of other drones similar in many ways to the Radioplane drones. The Globe company built a series of targets, beginning with the piston-powered KDG Snipe of 1946, which evolved through the KD2G and KD5G pulsejet-powered targets and the KD3G and KD4G piston-powered targets, to the KD6G series of piston-powered targets. The KD6G series appears to have been the only one of the Globe targets to be built in substantial numbers. It was similar in size and configuration to the BTT series, but had a twin-fin tail. It was redesignated "MQM-40" in the early 1960s, by which time it was generally out of service.

The use of drones as decoys goes back to at least the 1950s, with the Northrop Crossbow tested in such a role. The first operational decoy drone was the McDonnell Douglas "ADM-20 Quail", which was carried by Boeing B-52 Stratofortress bombers to help them penetrate defended airspace.

By the late 1950s combat aircraft were capable of Mach 2, and so faster targets had to be developed to keep pace. Northrop designed a turbojet-powered Mach 2 target in the late 1950s, originally designated the Q-4 but later given the designation of AQM-35. In production form, it was a slender dart with wedge-shaped stubby wings, swept conventional tail assembly, and a General Electric J85 turbojet engine, like that used on the Northrop F-5 fighter.

=== Nuclear tests ===
In 1946, eight B-17 Flying Fortresses were transformed by American airmen into drones for collecting radioactive data. They were controlled at takeoff and landing from a transmitter on a jeep, and during flight by a transmitter on another B-17. They were used on Bikini Atoll (Operation Crossroads) to gather samples from inside the radioactive cloud. During test Baker, two drones were flown directly above the explosion; when the shock wave reached them, both gained height, and the lowest was damaged. The U.S. Navy conducted similar tests with Grumman F6F Hellcat drones. The B-17 drones were employed in a similar manner in Operation Sandstone in 1947, and in Operation Greenhouse in 1951. In this latter test, also several Lockheed P-80 Shooting Star jets were used, modified into drones by Sperry Corporation; however, the complex system resulted in a very high accident rate. One of the B-17 drones, tail number 44-83525, is currently under restoration at Davis–Monthan Air Force Base.

=== Reconnaissance platforms ===
In the late 1950s, along with the Falconer, the US Army acquired another reconnaissance drone, the Aerojet-General SD-2 Overseer. It had a similar configuration to the Falconer, but featured a vee tail and was about twice as heavy.

The success of drones as targets led to their use for other missions. The well-proven Ryan Firebee was a good platform for such experiments, and tests to evaluate it for the reconnaissance mission proved highly successful. A series of reconnaissance drones derived from the Firebee, the Ryan Model 147 Lightning Bug series, were used by the US to spy on North Vietnam, Communist China, and North Korea in the 1960s and early 1970s.

The Lightning Bugs were not the only long-range reconnaissance drones developed in the 1960s. The US developed other, more specialized reconnaissance drones: the Ryan "Model 154", the Ryan and Boeing "Compass Copes", and the Lockheed D-21, all of which were more or less cloaked in secrecy.

=== Soviet Union projects ===
The USSR also developed a number of reconnaissance drones, though since many programs the Soviets pursued were cloaked in secrecy, details of these aircraft are unclear and contradictory.

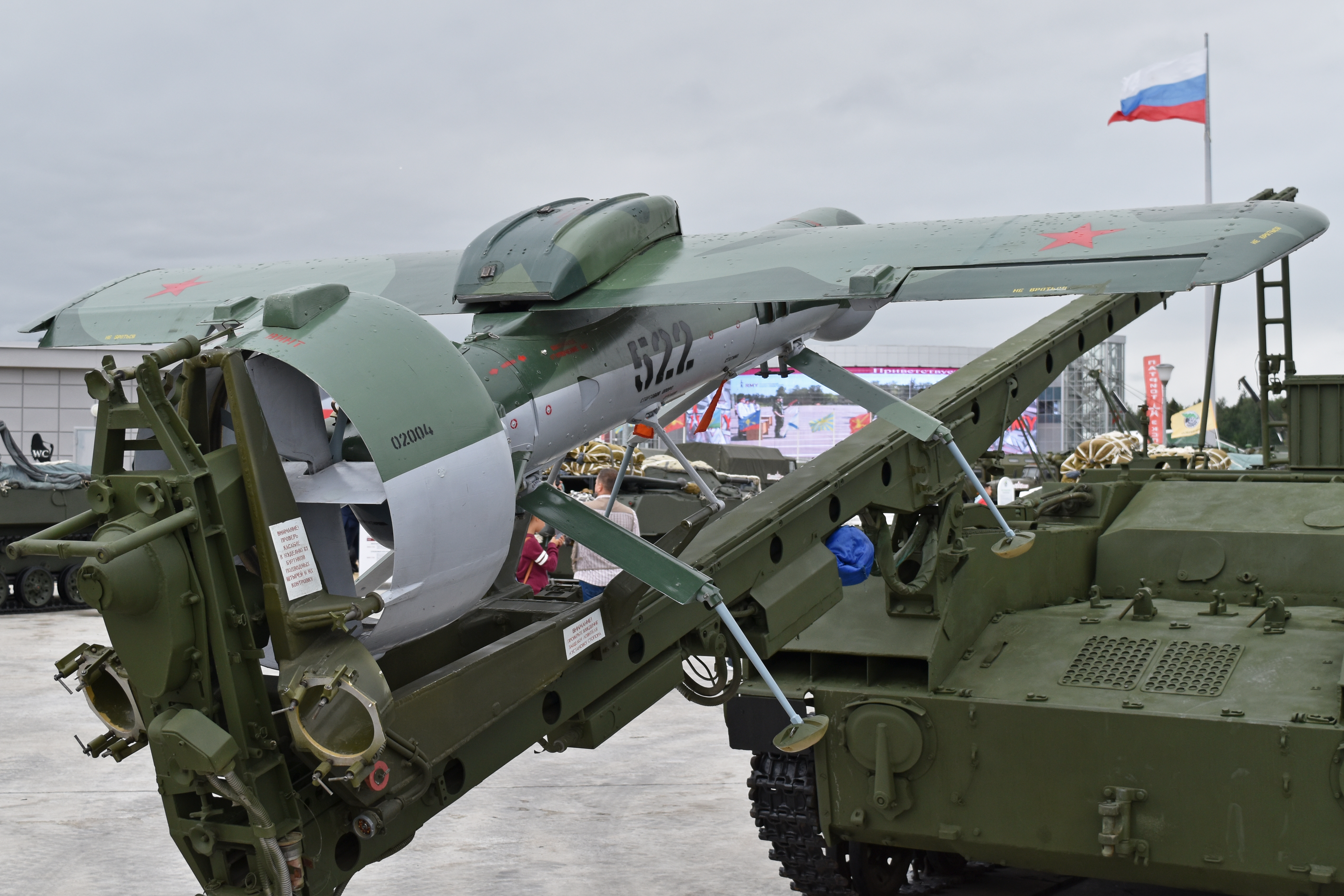
Yakolev Pchela-1K on Stroy-P launcher

Known drone systems planned or developed by the former Soviet Union include (in alphabetical order):

- Lavochkin La-17
- Tupolev Tu-123
- Tupolev Tu-141
- Tupolev Tu-143
- Tupolev Voron
- Yakovlev Pchela

=== Vietnam War: Reconnaissance drones ===
By late 1959, the only spy plane available to the US was the U-2. Spy satellites were another year and half away, and the SR-71 Blackbird was still on the drawing board. In such a climate, concerns appeared about the negative publicity from the foreseen capture of US airmen on the communist territory. Pilots' fears were realized in May 1960, when U-2 pilot Francis Gary Powers was shot down over the USSR. Not surprisingly, work intensified on an unmanned drone which would be capable of penetrating deep into enemy territory, and return with precise military intelligence. Within three months of the downing of the U-2, the highly classified UAV (called RPV back then) program was born, under the code name of Red Wagon.

Just after the incident involving the US Navy destroyers USS Maddox (DD-731) and USS Turner Joy (DD-951), and even before it escalated into the presidential "Tonkin Gulf Resolution" and war with North Vietnam, the USAF had issued an immediate order for the UAV units to deploy immediately for Southeast Asia on any available C-130s or C-133s. The first birds (drones) would be Ryan 147Bs (AQM-34s) piggy-backed on C-130s, after completing their missions they would be parachuted for recovery near Taiwan.

USAF drones (UAVs) of the Strategic Air Command deployed to the Republic of South Vietnam (RVN) as the 4025th Strategic Reconnaissance Squadron, 4080th Strategic Reconnaissance Wing in 1964. In 1966 the unit was redesignated as the 350th Strategic Reconnaissance Squadron, 100th Strategic Reconnaissance Wing.

The Squadron operated Ryan Firebees, launching them from modified DC-130A Hercules transport aircraft, normally two drones under each wing, each Hercules carrying 4 drones total. The UAVs deployed parachutes upon completing their missions and were usually recovered by helicopters which were tasked for those missions.

The North Vietnamese Air Force utilized U.S. drone flights to practice their aerial combat skills, and although claiming several successful interceptions, only 6 are known to have been shot down by NVAF MiGs. But there was a draw back for chasing drones; one North Vietnamese MiG ran out of fuel, causing the pilots to eject, a North Vietnamese SAM shot down a NVAF MiG-17 while in "hot pursuit of a drone." While another NVAF MiG-17 shot down another MiG which got into his line of fire while chasing a drone.

Between 1967 and until near the end of the U.S. involvement with the war in 1972, varied models of the 147SC Lightning Bug flew over half the missions over enemy territory. The average sortie per drone was three missions, before it was lost. The most famous Lightning Bug was a 147SC drone named "Tom Cat." Tom Cat flew sixty-eight missions before an enemy gunner finally brought him "down over Hanoi on September 25, 1974." From August 1964, until their last combat flight on 30 April 1975 (the fall of Saigon), the USAF 100th Strategic Reconnaissance Wing would launch 3,435 Ryan reconnaissance drones over North Vietnam and its surrounding areas, at a cost of about 554 UAVs lost to all causes during the war.

=== Iran–Iraq War ===
During the Iran–Iraq War, Iran sought the need for a new recon platform in addition to the RF-4. In the early 1980s, development of the Qods Mohajer-1 began, and production began in 1985. They were operated by the IRGC's Raad brigade in many key battles of the war, including Operation Karbala 5 and Operation Valfajr 8. They participated in 619 various missions, taking nearly 54,000 photographs. Iran also armed them with RPGs, as some images show, however it is unknown if they were used in combat with that configuration.

=== Post-war reflections ===
The usefulness of robot aircraft for reconnaissance had been demonstrated in Vietnam. At the same time, early steps were being taken to use them in active combat at sea and on land, but battlefield Unmanned aerial vehicles (UAV) would not come into their own until the 1980s.

During the early years, target drones were often launched from aircraft; or off a rail using solid-fuel rocket-assisted takeoff (RATO) boosters; or hydraulic, electromagnetic, or pneumatic catapult. Very small target drones can be launched by an elastic bungee catapult. Few target drones have landing gear, and so they are generally recovered by parachute or, in some cases, by a skid landing. Beginning in April 1966, and lasting through the end of the war in 1975, the USAF successfully conducted approximately 2,655 Mid-Air Retrieval System (MARS) catches, out of 2,745 attempts, primarily using the Ryan 147J model drone.

The most combat sorties flown during the war were made by the Ryan 147SC (military designation AQM-34L) with 1,651 missions. About 211 AQM-34Ls were lost during the war. The highest mission bird was a 147SC, named "Tom Cat", it accomplished 68 combat missions in Vietnam, before failing to return on 25 September 1974. Tom Cat was followed by Budweiser (with 63 missions), Ryan's Daughter (52 missions), and Baby Duck (46 missions).

The largest UAVs in Vietnam were the 147T, TE, and TF (Military model AQM-34P, 34Q, and 34R). These machines were 30' long, and had 32' wing spans, with 2,800 lb thrust engines. These flew 28, 268, and 216 combat sorties respectively; of which 23 AQM-34Q drones were lost, AQM-34R machines were destroyed, and 6 AQM-34P models never made it home.

== War on terror ==
The use of armed drones came into its own with the start of the war on terror. The global audience was exposed to armed drones and their lethal uses when after the September 11, 2001 attacks an American UAV killed Qaed Salim Sinan al-Harethi (aka Abu Ali al-Harithi) in a November 2002 drone strike that killed six people, including Qaed, the alleged mastermind of the 2000 USS Cole bombing.

=== Battlefield UAVs ===
The attitude towards UAVs, which were often seen as unreliable and expensive toys, changed dramatically with the Israeli Air Force’s victory over the Syrian Air Force in 1982. Israel’s coordinated use of UAVs alongside manned aircraft allowed the state to quickly destroy dozens of Syrian aircraft with minimal losses. Israeli drones were used as electronic decoys, electronic jammers as well as for real time video reconnaissance.

The US military is entering a new era in which UAVs will be critical to SIGINT payloads, or Electronic countermeasures systems should be in widespread use following 2010, with the UAVs controlled and relaying data back over high-bandwidth data links in real time, linked to ground, air, sea, and space platforms. The trend had been emerging before the American war in Afghanistan began in 2001, but was greatly accelerated by the use of UAVs in that conflict. The Predator RQ-1L UAV (General Atomics) was the first deployed UAV to the Balkans in 1995 Iraq in 1996 and was proved very effective in Operation Iraqi Freedom as well as Afghanistan.

=== Miniature and Micro UAVs ===
Another growth field in UAVs are miniature UAVs, ranging from "micro aerial vehicles (MAVs)" and miniature UAVs that can be carried by an infantryman to UAVs that can be carried and launched like an infantry man-portable air-defense system.

=== Endurance UAVs ===
The idea of designing a UAV that could remain in the air for a long time has been around for decades, but only became an operational reality in the 21st century. Endurance UAVs for low-altitude and high-altitude operation, the latter sometimes referred to as "high-altitude long-endurance (HALE)" UAVs, are now in full service.

On August 21, 1998, an AAI Aerosonde named Laima becomes the first UAV to cross the Atlantic Ocean, completing the flight in 26 hours.

=== Beamed power UAV experiments ===
The idea of using UAVs as a cheaper alternative to satellites for atmospheric research, earth and weather observation, and particularly communications goes back at least to the late 1950s, with conceptual studies focused on UAVs with conventional propulsion, or new forms of propulsion using microwave beamed power or photovoltaic solar cells.

Raytheon suggested what would now be described as a UAV using beamed power, flying at an altitude of 15 kilometers (9.3 mi), as far back as 1959, and actually performed a proof-of-concept demonstration in 1964, with a transmitting antenna powering a helicopter on a 20-meter (65 foot) tether. The helicopter carried a rectifying antenna or "rectenna" array incorporating thousands of diodes to convert the microwave beam into useful electrical power.

The 1964 demonstration received a good deal of publicity, but nothing came of it, since enthusiasm for Earth satellites was very high and the rectenna system was heavy and inefficient. However, in the 1970s, NASA became interested in beamed power for space applications, and, in 1982, published a design for a much lighter and cheaper rectenna system.

The NASA rectenna was made of a thin plastic film, with dipole antennas and receiving circuits embedded in its surface. In 1987, the Canadian Communications Research Center used such an improved rectenna to power a UAV with a wingspan of 5 meters (16 feet 5 inches) and a weight of 4.5 kilograms (9.9 pounds), as part of the Stationary High Altitude Relay Platform (SHARP) project. The SHARP UAV flew in a circle at 150 meters (490 feet) above a transmitting antenna. The UAV required 150 watts, and was able to obtain this level of power from the 6 to 12 kilowatt microwave beam.

=== Solar power ===
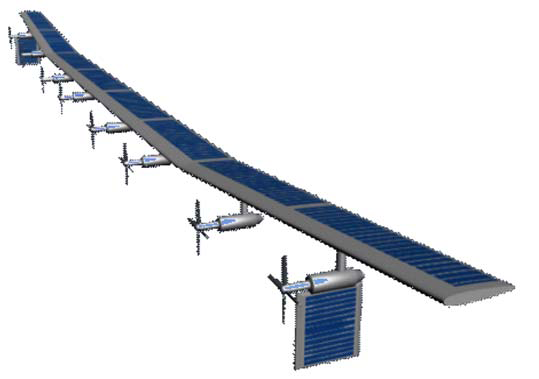
DARPA's Vulture, an ultra-long endurance aircraft

In the 1980s, new attention was focused on aircraft propelled by solar power. Solar photovoltaic (PV) cells are not very efficient, and the amount of power provided by the Sun over a unit area is relatively modest. A solar-powered aircraft must be lightly built to allow low-powered electric motors to get it off the ground. Such aircraft have been developed in the competition for the Kremer prize for human-powered flight. In the early 1970s, Dr. Paul B. MacCready and his AeroVironment company took a fresh look at the challenge, and came up with an unorthodox aircraft, the "Gossamer Condor", to win the Kremer Prize on 23 August 1977.

In 1980, Dupont Corporation backed AeroVironment in an attempt to build a solar-powered piloted aircraft that could fly from Paris, France, to England. The first prototype, the "Gossamer Penguin", was fragile and not very airworthy, but led to a better aircraft, the "Solar Challenger". This success led in turn to AeroVironment concepts for a solar-powered UAV. A solar-powered UAV could in principle stay aloft indefinitely, as long as it had a power-storage system to keep it flying at night. The aerodynamics of such an aircraft were challenging, since to reach high altitudes it had to be much lighter per unit area of wing surface than the Solar Challenger, and finding an energy storage system with the necessary high capacity and light weight was troublesome as well.

In 1983, AeroVironment investigated the concept, which was designated "High Altitude Solar (HALSOL)". The HALSOL prototype first flew in June 1983. HALSOL was a simple flying wing, with a span of 30 meters (98 feet 5 inches) and a width of 2.44 meters (8 feet). The main wing spar was made of carbon fiber composite tubing, with ribs made of styrofoam and braced with spruce and Kevlar, and covered with thin Mylar plastic film. The wing was light but remarkably strong.

The wing was built in five segments of equal span. Two gondolas hung from the center segment, which carried payload, radio control and telemetry electronics, and other gear. The gondolas also provided the landing gear. Each gondola had dual baby-buggy wheels in front and a bicycle wheel in back for landing gear. HALSOL was propelled by eight small electric motors driving variable-pitch propellers. There were two motors on the center wing segment, two motors on each inner wing segment, and one motor on each outer wing segment. The aircraft's total weight was about 185 kilograms (410 pounds), with about a tenth of that being payload.

Nine HALSOL flights took place in the summer of 1983 at the isolated and secret Groom Lake base in Nevada. The flights were conducted using radio control and battery power, as the aircraft had not been fitted with solar cells. HALSOL's aerodynamics were validated, but the investigation led to the conclusion that neither PV cell nor energy storage technology were mature enough to make the idea practical for the time being. HALSOL was put into storage, and as it turned out, would be resurrected for greater glories later, as discussed later. For the moment, though, it remained a complete secret.

In the mid-1980s, not long after HALSOL went into mothballs, NASA awarded a contract to Lockheed to study a solar-powered HALE UAV named the "Solar High Altitude Powered Platform (Solar HAPP)" for missions such as crop monitoring, military reconnaissance, and communications relay. The Solar HAPP effort did not result in a prototype. Solar-powered HALE UAVs were a concept a bit ahead of their time, and early practical work on endurance UAVs focused on more conventional concepts.

=== Amber ===
In 1984, under a joint program (Teal Rain) with the U.S. Navy, DARPA issued a contract to Leading Systems Incorporated (LSI), based in Irvine, California, and led by Abraham Karem, to build an endurance UAV named "Amber". Amber was to be used for photographic reconnaissance, ELINT missions, or as a cruise missile.

Amber was approximately 4.6 meters (15 feet) long, had a wingspan of 8.54 meters (28 feet), weighed 335 kilograms (740 pounds), and was powered by a four-cylinder liquid-cooled piston engine providing 49 kW (65 hp), driving a pusher propeller in the tail. The wing was mounted on a short pylon above the fuselage. The cruise missile version of Amber would discard the wing when it made its final dive on a target.

Amber had an inverted v-tail, which would prove a popular configuration for a pusher UAV, since it protected the propeller during takeoff and landing. The airframe was made of plastic and composite materials, mostly Kevlar, and the UAV had retractable stiltlike tricycle landing gear to ensure propeller clearance. Amber had a flight endurance of 38 hours or more.

The initial contract specified three "Basic Amber" A-45 cruise missile prototypes and three B-45 reconnaissance prototypes. Initial flights were in November 1986, with long-endurance flights the next year. Up to this time, Amber was a deep secret, but in 1987 details of the program were released.

Amber was only one of a number of different US UAV programs in planning at the time, and the US Congress became impatient with what was perceived as confusion and duplication of effort. Congress ordered a consolidation of UAV programs in 1987, freezing funding until June 1988, when the centralized Joint Program Office for UAV development, mentioned earlier, was established. Amber survived the consolidation of UAV efforts into JPO, resulting in the first "Amber I" reconnaissance UAV, which first flew in October 1989. Seven Amber Is were built, and were used in evaluations along with Basic Ambers through 1990. However, funding for reconnaissance assets was being cut, and in 1990 the Amber program was killed. LSI was faced with bankruptcy, and was bought out by General Atomics in 1991, who would later develop the Amber into an operational platform, the MQ-1 Predator.

=== U.S. domestic use ===
The U.S. Customs and Border Protection agency has experimented with several models of UAVs, and has begun purchasing a fleet of unarmed MQ-9 Reapers to survey the U.S. border with Mexico. "In more than six months of service, the Predator's surveillance aided in nearly 3900 arrests and the seizure of four tons of marijuana", border officials say.

On May 18, 2006, the Federal Aviation Administration (FAA) issued a certificate of authorization which will allow the M/RQ-1 and M/RQ-9 aircraft to be used within U.S. civilian airspace to search for survivors of disasters. Requests had been made in 2005 for the aircraft to be used in search and rescue operations following Hurricane Katrina, but because there was no FAA authorization in place at the time, the assets were not used. The Predator's infrared camera with digitally enhanced zoom has the capability of identifying the heat signature of a human body from an altitude of 10,000 feet, making the aircraft an ideal search and rescue tool.

According to a 2006 Wall Street Journal report, "After distinguished service in war zones in recent years, unmanned planes are hitting turbulence as they battle to join airliners and weekend pilots in America's civilian skies. Drones face regulatory, safety and technological hurdles – even though demand for them is burgeoning. Government agencies want them for disaster relief, border surveillance and wildfire fighting, while private companies hope to one day use drones for a wide variety of tasks, such as inspecting pipelines and spraying pesticides on farms."

Recreational drones became popular in the United States in 2015, with approximately one million expected to be sold by the end of the year.

=== Drones Over Canada ===
The Government of Canada is considering the purchase of UAV's for arctic surveillance. The Canadian government wants to buy at least three high-altitude, unmanned aerial vehicles for potential Arctic use. The Canadian government wants to modify the existing Global Hawk drone, which can operate at 20,000 metres, to meet the rigours of flying in Canada's Far North.

=== Small-player use ===
At one time the cost of miniature technology limited the usage of UAVs to larger and better funded groups such as the US military, but due to falling costs of UAV technology, including vehicles and monitoring equipment in their simpler forms, it has become available to groups that before would not have had the funding to use it. Beginning in 2004, it was reported that the Lebanese Shi'ite militia organization Hezbollah began operating the Mirsad-1 UAV, with the stated goal of arming the aircraft for cross-border attacks into Israel. According to one blogger, however, the drone was an actually an Iranian Ababil-2 loitering munition. Iranian-backed militias across the Middle East now operate advanced UAVs, including the Houthis in Yemen who used Samad drones in an effective attack on Aramco facilities in Saudi Arabia in 2019.

== See also ==
- Battlefield UAVs in the United States
- History of unmanned combat aerial vehicles
- British unmanned aerial vehicles of World War I
- List of military aircraft of the United States
- List of unmanned aerial vehicles
- Miniature UAVs
- Modern US endurance UAVs
- Unmanned combat aerial vehicle
