= OQ-15 =

General information
- Type: Target drone
- National origin: United States
- Primary user: USAAF
- Number built: 5

History
- First flight: 1945

The OQ-15 was a prototype American subscale drone built for the US Army Air Forces in the mid-1940s.

In early 1945, the OQ-15 was built and tested by the USAAF, but only five were built. It was built to meet the same USAAF drone requirement as the Radioplane OQ-17.

== Specification ==
Data from

General characteristics

- Crew: none
- Wingspan: 12 ft 0 in (3.6 m)
- Gross weight: 150 lb (70 kg)
- Powerplant: 1 × Kiekhaefer O-45-3 , 7 hp (5 kW)

Performance

- Maximum speed: 160 mph (260 km/h, 140 kn)
- Endurance: 1 hours 0 minutes
- Service ceiling: 15,000 ft (4,600 m)

== See also ==
- History of unmanned aerial vehicles § Reginald Denny and the Radioplane

Related lists

- List of military aircraft of the United States
