= KDG =

KDG could refer to:

== Military ==
- 1st King's Dragoon Guards, a defunct British regiment
- Globe KDG Snipe, an American target drone

== Transport ==
- Kardzhali Airport, Bulgaria (IATA:KDG)
- Kedgaon railway station, India (KDG)
- Kidsgrove railway station in England (KDG)

== Education ==
- Karel de Grote University of Applied Sciences and Arts, in Belgium

== Other uses ==
- Seba language of the Kunda people in Zambia (ISO 639-3:KDG)
- de:Komponisten der Gegenwart ("Contemporary Composers"), a German-language music encyclopedia
