= Globe KD5G =

American pulsejet target drone

KD5G
- Globe XKD5G on display at the Steven F. Udvar-Hazy Center

General information
- Type: Target drone
- National origin: United States
- Manufacturer: Globe Aircraft Corporation
- Primary user: United States Navy

The Globe KD5G is a pulsejet-powered American target drone produced by Globe Aircraft Corporation that began development in 1949. Due to changing requirements for drone performance, it was only operated by the United States Navy for a short period.

== Design and development ==
The XKD5G-1 was of conventional high-wing, twin-tail design, a Marquardt PJ46 pulsejet being mounted externally atop the fuselage, in the same style as the World War II German V-1; it was one of the last aircraft produced for the U.S. military to be powered by a pulsejet. The KD5G had a top speed of 345 miles per hour (555 km/h); if it was not shot down during its mission, it could be recovered by parachute to be flown again.

== Operational history ==
Originating in 1949, the XKD5G-1 first flew in 1950, and was tested at the Naval Air Test Center in Point Mugu, California. By 1952, however, the speed requirements for target drones had increased to the point that the KD5G was considered too slow for operational service, while pulsejets also lost efficiency quickly at higher altitudes; as a result the XKD5G-1 project was cancelled.

== Surviving aircraft ==
A surviving XKD5G-1 was donated to the National Air and Space Museum by the U.S. Navy in 1966; it is displayed in the Steven F. Udvar-Hazy Center.

== Specifications (KD5G-1) ==
Data from Parsch 2003; placard at Udvar-Hazy

General characteristics

- Crew: None
- Length: 13 ft 6 in (4.11 m)
- Wingspan: 9 ft (2.7 m)
- Powerplant: 1 × Marquardt PJ46-MA-2 pulsejet, 175 lbf (0.78 kN) thrust

Performance

- Maximum speed: 345 mph (555 km/h, 300 kn)

== See also ==
Aircraft of comparable role, configuration, and era

- Curtiss KD2C Skeet
- McDonnell TD2D Katydid
- NAMU KDN Gorgon

Related lists

- List of unmanned aerial vehicles
