= Radioplane OQ-6 =

1940s American target drone

OQ-6

General information
- Type: Target drone
- National origin: United States
- Manufacturer: Radioplane Company
- Primary user: United States Army Air Forces

History
- First flight: November 1944

The Radioplane OQ-6 was a target drone developed by the Radioplane Company under the designation RP-14 and evaluated by the United States Army Air Forces for service use. A small number were procured, but major production contracts were cancelled by the end of World War II.

== Design and development ==
The Radioplane RP-14 was a small aircraft of conventional design, with a strut-braced monoplane wing and conventional empennage; power was from a Righter O-45 four-cylinder horizontally opposed piston engine. An improved version, the RP-15, replaced the O-45 with a McCulloch O-90. The airframe was improved over the company's preceding OQ-3, with improved streamlining.

== Operational history ==
The RP-14 first flew in November 1944; designated OQ-6 by the U.S. Army Air Forces (USAAF), evaluation led to the development of the improved RP-15, designated OQ-6A, and orders for production of the aircraft in quantity were placed. These orders were cancelled due to the end of World War II; however, some OQ-6s, redesignated XOQ-6A, were still in service with the United States Air Force (USAF) in 1948.

== Variants and operators ==
RP-14
Initial version powered by Righter O-45
OQ-6
USAAF designation of RP-14.
RP-15
Improved version of RP-14 with 60 hp (45 kW) McCulloch O-90; top speed 195 miles per hour (314 km/h).
OQ-6A
USAAF designation of RP-15.
XOQ-6A
USAF redesignation of surviving OQ-6s and OQ-6As.

== Specifications (OQ-6) ==
Data from Parsch 2003

General characteristics

- Crew: None
- Length: 10 ft (3.0 m)
- Wingspan: 14 ft (4.3 m)
- Gross weight: 295 lb (134 kg)
- Powerplant: 1 × Righter O-45 horizontally-opposed piston engine, 22 hp (16 kW)

Performance

- Maximum speed: 168 mph (270 km/h, 146 kn)

== See also ==
Related lists

- List of military aircraft of the United States
- List of unmanned aerial vehicles
