= Bennett BTC-1 =

American target drone

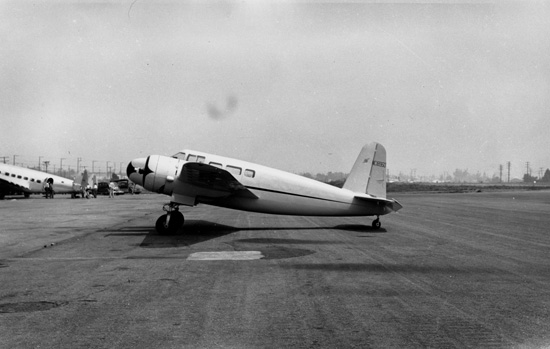

General information
- Type: Eight-seat light transpoort
- Manufacturer: Bennett Aircraft Corporation
- Number built: 1

History
- First flight: 1937
- Retired: 1948

The Bennett Aircraft Corporation Bi-motored Transport Commercial Number One (BTC-1) Executive was a 1930s American eight-seat light transport aircraft built by the Bennett Aircraft Corporation. In the ten-year span of its known life, the Bennett BTC-1 was identified in print by four different names: the Bennett, the Breese Bennett, the Bowlus Bennett and the Globe BTC-1.

== Design ==
The BTC-1 was conceived by the aviation entrepreneur F. C. "Bub" Merrill. He sensed there was a need for an airplane with competitive performance; an appealing price; smaller, less expensive engines; and made of low cost wooden construction, with little need for expensive tooling. Unfortunately, Merrill did not have the financial resources to turn his concept into reality.

In late 1935, he turned to Frank C. Bennett, then President of Bennett Oil Corporation, President of Federal Oil of Houston, Texas, and Vice-President of Bennett Oil and Gas of Lake Charles, Louisiana. Merrill's choice of Bennett as an investor was no accident or stroke of luck, as he knew that it was common for oil companies to invest in the development of airplanes, and frequently sponsored flights and other events to highlight the performance of their products. After Merrill's convincing presentation, Bennett joined Merrill in forming the Bennett Aircraft Corporation of Wilmington, Delaware. The aircraft was to be a twin-engine (called bimotored in the 1930s), eight-place mid-wing monoplane with a conventional tail unit and retractable landing gear. It was powered by two wing-mounted Jacobs L-6 engines. The passenger cabin for six passengers was behind the two-crew flight deck.

Using Belgian chemist Dr. Leo Baekland's patented carbolic acid and formaldehyde phenolic resin compound marketed as "Bakelite", Dr. Robert Nebesar patented a process where bakelite-bonded fine grain plywood was formed under pressure and heat to produce a strong light weight curved panel. The process was marketed under the trade name "Duraloid."

Merrill's original concept called on Nebesar's patented Duraloid shapes to form the BTC-1 monocoque fuselage and tail surfaces. The combination of the skills of Baekland and Nebesar made possible the development of what can be considered the forerunner of today's composite aircraft.

Merrill put together a team of aircraft designers and builders to put his plan into action. Art Mankey from the Glenn L. Martin Company was Chief Engineer, Walter Chaffee, from Douglas Aircraft, a qualified test, and William Hawley Bowlus of San Fernando, California the designer and builder of gliders and sailplanes since 1911 which were mostly constructed using bent and formed wood.

Bowlus constructed his aircraft at his Ranch in San Fernando, which was equipped with the equipment to make structurally strong light weight and graceful shapes for world class high performance sailplanes. The BTC-1 offered a challenge to Bowlus but he had the reputation and skills as the premier plywood former in the aviation industry.

Bowlus, Breese and Mankey had worked at Ryan Aircraft. Bowlus was the factory manager in the production of the Ryan NYP Spirit of Saint Louis. Mankey was a contributing engineer there and Breese was the test pilot of the company's products.

When the BTC-1 was completed it was partially disassembled and trucked from San Fernando a short distance to the Van Nuys airport. The BTC-1 was reassembled and Van Breese began flight testing. On one of the first few flights the landing gear would not extend, so Breese made the landing wheels-up. The Duraloid skin and wooden structure sustained little damage. The result of the belly landing was remarkable as the damage was limited to the two bent Hamilton Standard Propellers and the aluminum cowling and landing gear doors.

On November 1, 1937 the Bennett BTC-1 received approval number 2-552 from the Civil Aeronautics Administration, and the aircraft was officially registered as N18690. They had a certificated airplane, but no factory or sales. With a total of $100,000.00 invested, Bennett and Merrill began a sales campaign directed to cities already exhibiting interest in aviation.

Among those cities was Fort Worth, Texas, where in 1936, the Bennett Aircraft Company located its new operation.

Two more individuals play an important part in the development of the BTC-1. The first was Airport Manager and Aviation Director, William "Bill" Fuller. Fuller was an attendee at one of the presentations given by Bennett and Merrill.

Second was John Clay Kennedy, who, after a lengthy career in the cattle and beef industry, settled in Fort Worth. He was a partner in a medical pharmaceutical company called Globe Laboratories. Kennedy bought the rights to a serum to immunize cattle from a disease called "Black Leg," an acute anaerobic bacterial disease fatal to most infected animals. Sales of the serum made Kennedy a millionaire.

He sold out and retired in 1930, spending eight years raising horses and traveling. By 1938 he was looking for an enterprise to keep him busy. In a chance meeting with Bill Fuller, Kennedy confided his desires to Fuller. Fuller told Kennedy about the Bennett Corporation and in a short time the Bennett Aircraft Corporation of Wilmington, Delaware, passed into history, when on April 9, 1940 the Bennett Aircraft Corporation of Texas was born. The incorporators were Bennett, Kennedy and the owner of a large Fort Worth insurance agency, H. E. Brants.

No orders were placed for the aircraft and no production aircraft were built. With nothing but expenses on the horizon, the Bennett Corporation declared bankruptcy and went out of the business in 1940. Late in 1940, John Clay Kennedy, the principal stockholder in the Bennett Aircraft Corporation, emerged from the bankruptcy as the owner of the assets of the firm. Kennedy then formed the Globe Aircraft Company in 1941. He also ended up with the BTC-1 which was renamed the Globe BTC-1.

== Construction ==
Three-quarter front view

The BTC-1 followed the basic design criteria of the 1930s for light transport aircraft. The American design philosophy of the time evolved around twin-engine, six to eight passenger, monocoque monoplanes.

Airframe construction of the time was typically all-metal duraluminum with flight control surfaces covered with fabric. Favored engines were Jacobs, Wright and Pratt-Whitney in the 230 to 450 Horsepower range, per side. The one constant in the aviation industry at the time was escalating cost, which has continued to today.

The Bennett was built using two low cost methods, horsepower versus weight and materials advancement. The principal structural material was Duraloid, a plywood impregnated with resin and processed under a patented process. If the design criteria proved successful the BTC-1 could fly at competitive speeds with less power and at lower manufacturing costs.

=== Fuselage ===
The internal fuselage structure of the BTC-1 was of built-up frames with alignment and load transfer through routed stringers. The Duraloid outer skin was bonded to this internal structure.

It is not possible to determine the number and disposition of parting lines of the fuselage skin. However, if William Hawley Bowlus followed his own standard practice, entire sides from upper to lower center lines would have been molded as one piece. The average thickness of the skin would have been one quarter inch with additional laminations providing attaching points for the internal structure. Given the overall use of Duraloid throughout the airframe components it is reasonable to believe the bonding was accomplished using the Bakelite-based resin.

When the two fuselage halves were mated and fully skinned, they were covered with a lightweight fabric covering material. In 1936 it would have been either cotton or linen doped over the Duraloid skin. Clear nitrate was used to bond and fill the fabric covering. The filling of the fabric weave would have been accomplished by mixing extra fine sawdust with the clear dope sanded smooth to the desired finish. This same process was followed throughout the aircraft. Many comments were made on the outstanding finish of the product.

The interior layout of the fuselage suffered from the same obstruction as some of the earlier Lockheeds. The main spar and its related hump virtually separated the cockpit from the main cabin. This required two different entry doors, both requiring over-wing access.

=== Wings ===
Given Bowlus's penchant for consistency, all-Duraloid construction is the most likely as there is no photographic or descriptive text indicating the wing to have been other than a fully monocoque cantilever structure.

The main spar of the wing was fabricated as a full span tapered box. To this box spar was attached a formed leading edge forming a full span D-cell. The ribs were bonded to the aft face of the spar and to the upper and lower wing skins. This method of assembly would have resulted in a strong, light structure. The flap structure followed the same format as the wing and the aileron structure varied only in being fabric covered.

=== Empennage ===
The vertical fin and horizontal stabilizers were fixed cantilever structures. The design followed the same practices as the wing structure, with additional thickness at the leading edge of the stabilizers as protection from ground damage.

The rudder and elevators were of the same construction as the ailerons. Trim tabs were adjustable from the cockpit.

Vance Breese was primarily referred to as the test pilot, but he was also acknowledged as a contributing designer of the Executive. The empennage of the BTC-1 was almost certainly a Breese design. When compared with the configurations of the Breese-Dallas, the Vultee model V-1, and the Vultee model 51, which became the BT-13 and 15, the planforms and ratios are virtually the same. Breese engineering skills contributed to all of those designs.

=== Powerplant ===
The Executive was equipped with two 285 horsepower Jacobs seven cylinder L-5 radial engines. However, the performance figures quoted by the Bennett group were based upon anticipated performance of the aircraft using Jacobs 300 horsepower L-6 engines. Sales information provided also mentions anticipated use of the Wright R-760-E Whirlwind of 350 horsepower. There is no record of installation of either of the larger engine choices.

The propellers were two-bladed Hamilton-Standard controllable pitch or constant speed units as an option.

The engines used welded steel tube engine mount of 4130 Chrome-Molybdenum tubing and flat stock. It is reasonable to assume that load bearing members of the mount system extended far enough to transfer the torsion and tension loads into the main wing 3structure.

=== Landing gear ===
The fully retractable main landing gear were welded steel and flat stock structures with single fork mounted Goodyear low pressure tires. The majority of the landing loads were absorbed through air-oil struts providing eight inches of travel.

Landing gear retraction was hydraulically powered by an engine driven pump, or with emergency extension by gravity and a manually operated hand pump in the cockpit.

The aircraft was equipped with a full swiveling tail wheel. There is no mention of the auxiliary wheel being retractable.

=== Accommodations ===
The cockpit and passenger cabin were separated by the main wing spar. The cockpit had seating and controls for two; however, the right hand controls were noted as being easily removable, allowing a seventh passenger in lieu of the additional pilot.

The passenger cabin provided seating for six in various configurations. There were provisions for luggage stowage in the aft cabin and in a smaller compartment in the nose of the aircraft.

=== Doors ===
Entry into the cockpit and passenger cabin were from the upper surface of the wing center section. Access was through bi-fold doors latched at the bottom. Both doors were equipped with a center hinge allowing the doors, when opened, to lay folded onto the upper surface of the fuselage.

=== Finish and appearance ===
The aircraft was painted in overall cream with trim lines and number in red. The outstanding appearance was of its smooth skin and excellent finish, a virtual trademark of William Hawley Bowlus.

== Specifications (BTC-1) ==
Data from The Bennett Aircraft Corporation Model BTC-1 Executive, Skyways. January 2005

General characteristics

- Crew: Two
- Capacity: Six
- Length: 30 ft 6 in (9.3 m)
- Wingspan: 48 ft 2 in (14.68 m)
- Height: 9 ft 5 in (2.87 m)
- Wing area: 302 sq ft (28 m^{2})
- Empty weight: 4,516 lb (2,048 kg)
- Gross weight: 6,908 lb (3,133 kg)
- Powerplant: 2 × Jacobs L-6 7-cylinder radial piston engine , 230 hp (172 kW) each

Performance

- Maximum speed: 206 mph (332 km/h, 179 kn)
- Cruise speed: 196 mph (315 km/h, 170 kn) at 8,000 ft (2,400 m)
- Range: 1,200 mi (1,900 km, 1,000 nmi)
- Endurance: 6 hours
- Service ceiling: 22,500 ft (6,860 m)
- Rate of climb: 1,480 ft/min (7.5 m/s) at sea level

== See also ==
Aircraft of comparable role, configuration, and era

- Beechcraft Model 18
- Lockheed Model 10 Electra
- Barkley-Grow T8P-1
