= McDonnell PJ40 =

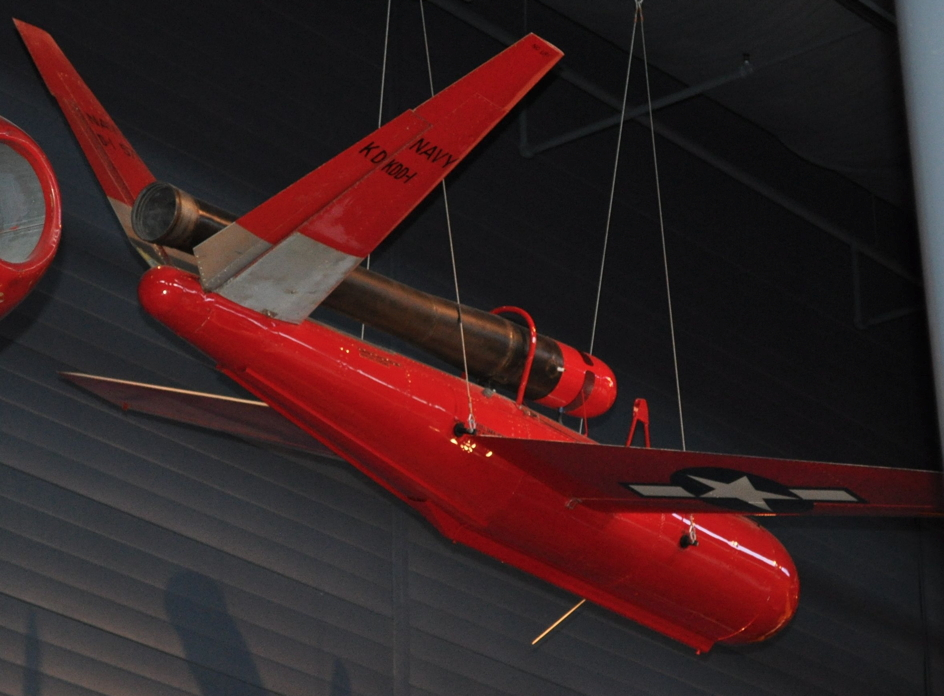
- XPJ40-MD-2 on Katydid target drone
- Type: Pulsejet
- National origin: United States
- Manufacturer: McDonnell Aircraft
- First run: 1942
- Major applications: McDonnell TD2D Katydid

The McDonnell PJ40 was a pulsejet engine built by McDonnell Aircraft during the mid 1940s.

== Variants and applications ==
XPJ40-MD-2
McDonnell TD2D Katydid

== Specifications (XPJ40-MD-2) ==
Data from NASM

==== General characteristics ====
- Type: Pulsejet
- Length: 71.5 inches (1,820 mm)
- Diameter: 7.5 inches (190 mm)
- Dry weight:

==== Components ====
- Compressor: None
- Fuel type: Petrol

==== Performance ====
- Maximum thrust: 660 lbf (2,900 N)
