= Globe KD6G Firefly =

American target drone

KD6G Firefly
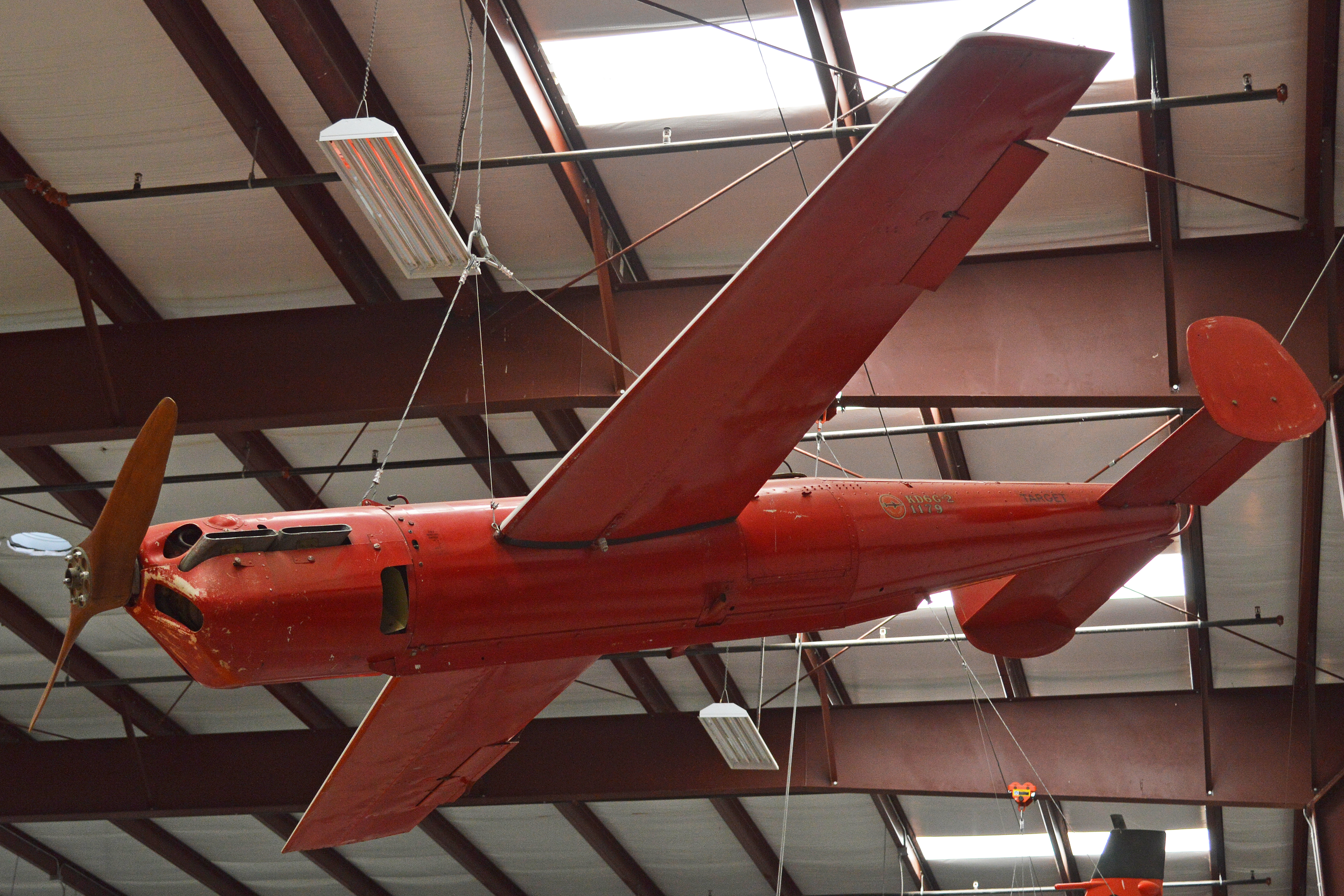
- KD6G-2 at the Yanks Air Museum

General information
- Type: Target drone
- National origin: United States
- Manufacturer: Globe Aircraft Corporation
- Primary user: United States Navy

History
- First flight: 1951
- Retired: c. 1965
- Developed from: Globe KD2G Firefly

The Globe KD6G Firefly is an American target drone, built by the Globe Aircraft Corporation for operation by the United States Navy during the 1950s and early 1960s.

== Design and development ==
The design of the KD6G was based on the earlier Globe KD2G Firefly target drone, featuring a mid-wing configuration with a twin-fin empennage, but instead of a pulsejet powerplant as in the KD2G the KD6G was fitted with a single piston engine in a tractor configuration. Launched via catapult, the KD6G was radio-controlled during flight, and, if it was not shot down in the course of its mission, would be recovered via parachute.

== Operational history ==
First flying in prototype form in 1951, the KD6G proved successful and was ordered into production in two forms, the KD6G-1 with a McCullough O-100 engine, and the KD6G-2 with a Kiekhaefer V-105 powerplant. Used extensively by the United States Navy during the 1950s in the gunnery training role, the KD6G-2 was redesignated in 1963 in the new unified missile sequence, becoming the MQM-40A before being retired soon thereafter.

== Variants ==
XKD6G-1
Prototype with McCullogh O-100-1 engine
KD6G-1
Production version of XKD6G-1
KD6G-2
Production version with Kiekhaefer V-105-2 engine
XQM-40A
Initial redesignation of KD6G-2
MQM-40A
Final redesignation of KD6G-2

== Aircraft on display ==
A KD6G-2 is on display at the Pima Air & Space Museum; another is at the Planes of Fame Air Museum.

== Specifications (KD6G-2) ==
Data from Parsch

General characteristics

- Crew: None
- Length: 11 ft 6 in (3.51 m)
- Wingspan: 11 ft 6 in (3.51 m)
- Height: 1 ft 7 in (0.48 m)
- Powerplant: 1 × Kiekhaefer V-105-2 piston engine, 100 hp (75 kW)

Performance

- Maximum speed: 265 mph (426 km/h, 230 kn)
- Endurance: 60 min

== See also ==
Related development

- Globe KDG Snipe
- Globe KD2G Firefly
- Globe KD3G Snipe

Aircraft of comparable role, configuration, and era

- Beechcraft MQM-61 Cardinal
- Radioplane BTT

Related lists

- List of unmanned aerial vehicles
