= Globe Aircraft Corporation =

Defunct American aircraft manufacturer

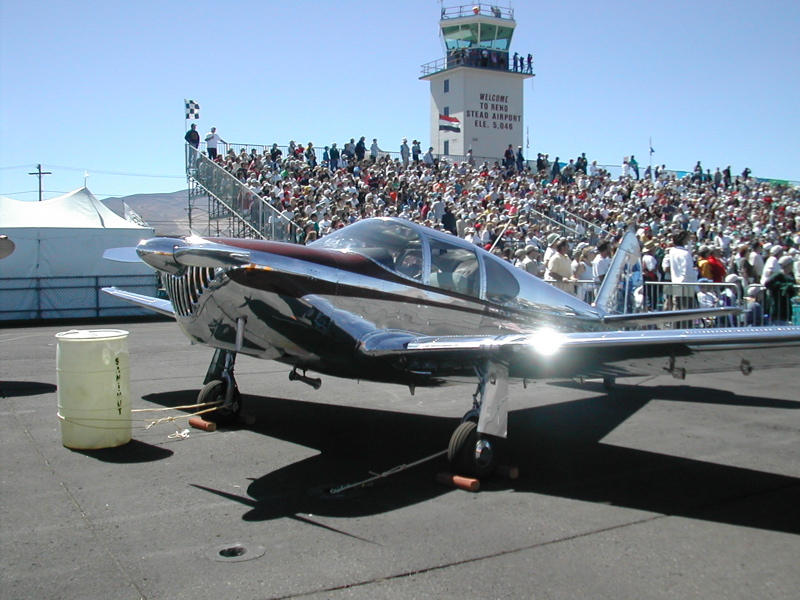
- A Globe Swift at the Reno Air Races in 2003
- Formerly: Bennett Aircraft Corporation
- Industry: Aerospace
- Founded: 5 April 1940
- Founders: Frank W. Bennett; F. C. "Bub" Merrill
- Defunct: 1947
- Fate: Bankrupt
- Successor: Temco Aircraft
- Headquarters: Fort Worth, Texas, United States
- Key people: William G. Fuller; John Kennedy

The Globe Aircraft Corporation was an American aircraft manufacturer formed in 1940 in Fort Worth, Texas. It was declared bankrupt in 1947.

== History ==
The Bennett Aircraft Corporation was originally formed on 5 April 1940 to develop aircraft using a Bakelite bonded plywood Duraloid. The company's first design was the BTC-1 twin engined monoplane. The company was renamed the Globe Aircraft Corporation in 1941 and they produced a single-engined Continental A-80 powered Globe GC-1 Swift.

With the start of the war the company abandoned plans to produce the aircraft as it concentrated on sub-contract building of 600 Beech AT-10s and components for other aircraft like the Curtiss C-46.

When wartime restrictions were removed the company developed a re-designed and all-metal version of the GC-1 designated the GC-1A Swift which first flew in 1945. The production of the Swift was sub-contracted to the Texas Engineering and Manufacturing Company (TEMCO). In July 1947 the company was declared bankrupt; the assets and design rights of the Swift were bought by TEMCO.

== Aircraft ==
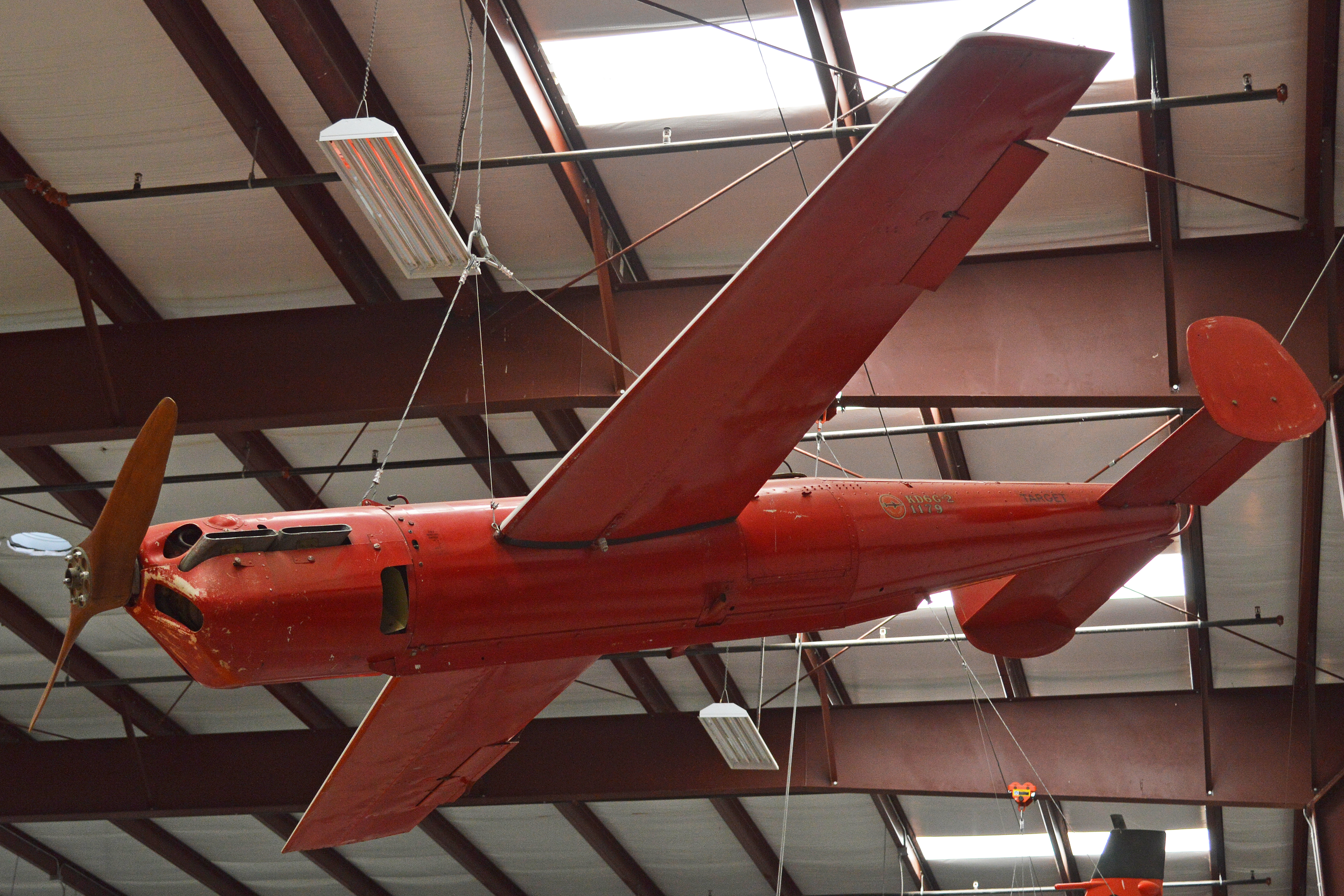
Globe KD6G-2 Firefly

Model name	First flight	Number built	Type
Bennett BTC-1	1940	1	Twin engine transport
Globe GC-1 Swift	1941	1,521	Sport airplane
Globe AT-10 Wichita	1943	600	Twin engine trainer
Globe KDG Snipe	1946		Target drone
Globe KD2G Firefly	1946		Target drone
Globe KD3G Snipe	1946		Target drone
Globe KD4G Quail	1949		Target drone
Globe KD5G	1950		Target drone
Globe KD6G Firefly	1951		Target drone
