= Righter O-45 =

Aircraft engine

O-45
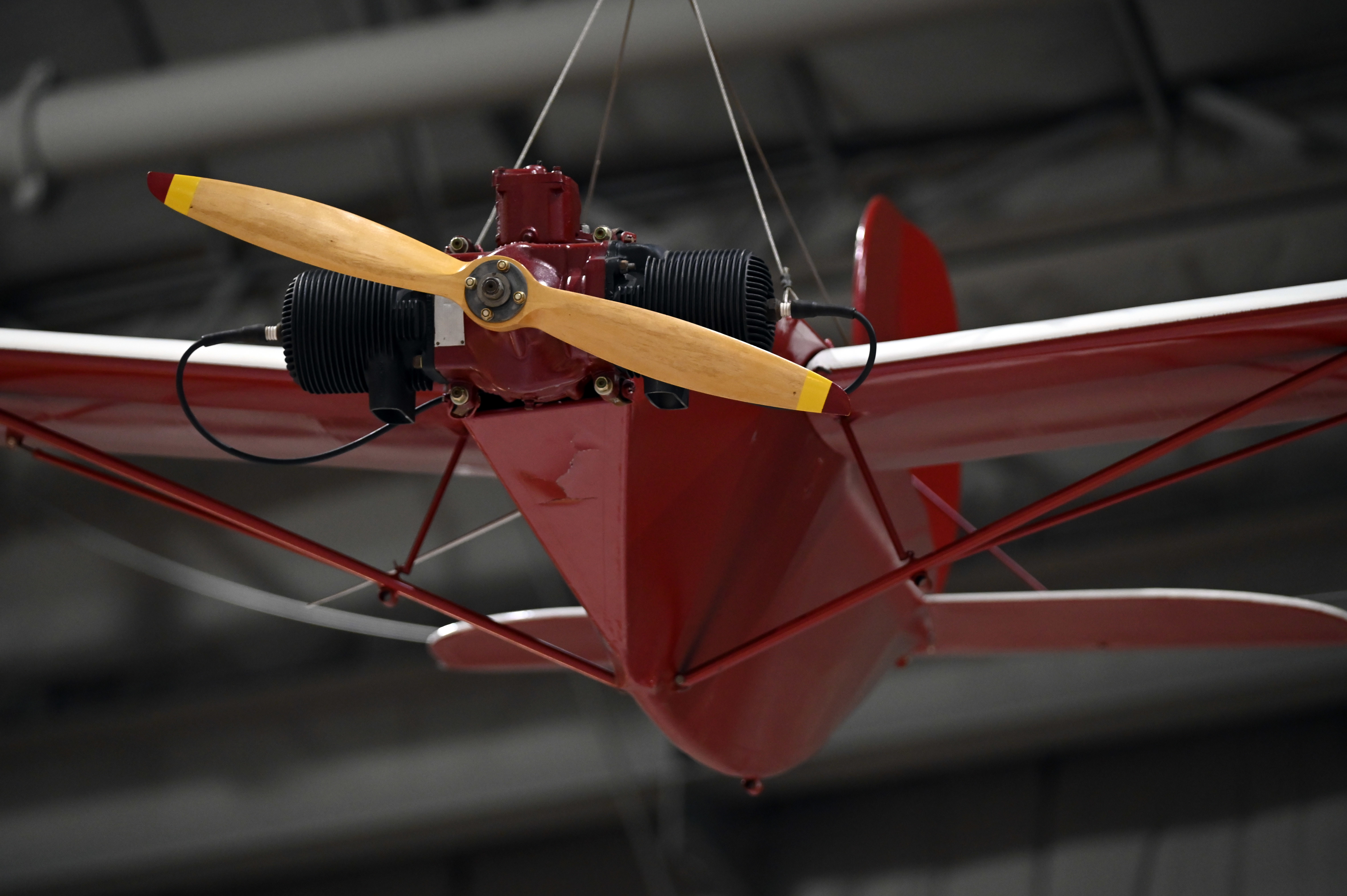
- Radioplane OQ-14 powered by a Righter O-45. National Museum of the United States Air Force.
- Type: Flat-twin
- Manufacturer: Righter Manufacturing Company
- Major applications: Globe KD3G

The Righter/Kiekhaefer O-45 was an air-cooled, two-stroke aircraft engine of flat-twin configuration, used extensively for powering target drones in the late 1940s.

Designed by the Righter Manufacturing Company, the O-45 was also built by the Kiekhaefer Corporation and the Menasco Motors Company.

== Variants ==
O-45-1
20 horsepower (15 kW) version
O-45-3
35 horsepower (26 kW) version
O-45-35
Navy version of O-45-3

== Applications ==
- Beecraft Wee Bee
- Frankfort OQ-16/TD3D
- Globe KD3G Snipe
- Globe KD4G Quail
- O'Neill Pea Pod
- OQ-15
- Radioplane OQ-6
- Radioplane OQ-14
- Radioplane OQ-17/KDR
- Radioplane TDD
- ULM 811 Ultra Cruiser Ultavia

== Specifications (O-45-1) ==
Data from

=== General characteristics ===
- Type: 2-cylinder air-cooled horizontally opposed direct drive naturally aspirated two-stroke aircraft piston engine
- Bore: 3.25 in (82.6 mm)
- Stroke: 2.75 in (69.9 mm)
- Displacement: 45.5 cu in (745.6 cc)
- Dry weight: 34 lb (15.4 kg)

=== Components ===
- Fuel type: 73 octane gasoline
- Cooling system: Air-cooled

=== Performance ===
- Power output:
- (Normal): 20 hp (14.9 kW) at 3,800 rpm at sea level

== See also ==
Related lists

- List of aircraft engines
