= Beechcraft AT-10 Wichita =

American training aircraft of WWII

AT-10 Wichita
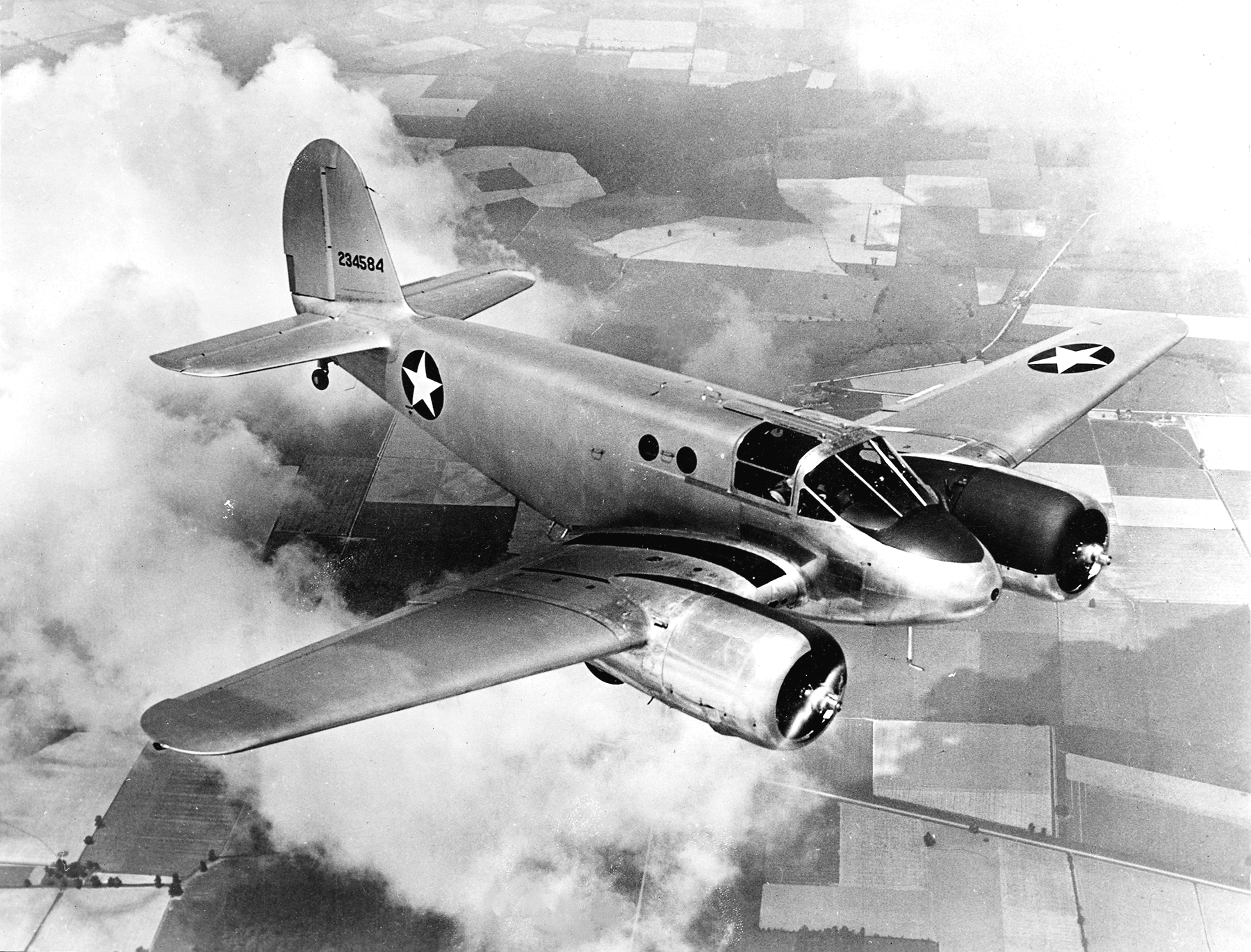

General information
- Type: Military trainer aircraft
- National origin: United States
- Manufacturer: Beechcraft
- Primary user: United States Army Air Forces
- Number built: 2,371

History
- Manufactured: 1942–1944
- Introduction date: 1942
- First flight: 1941

The Beechcraft AT-10 Wichita is a twin-engined trainer aircraft designed and produced by the American aircraft manufacturer Beechcraft. Principally flown by the United States Army Air Forces (USAAF) throughout the World War II in the trainer role; over half of all USAAF pilots undertook transitional training in the AT-10.

That AT-1o was developed during the early 1940s in response to a requirement issued by the United States Army Air Corps (USAAC) for a multi-engined trainer aircraft for pilots intended to operate bombers and transport aircraft. Beechcraft responded with the Model 25, designed specifically for this need; while sharing some features with the Model 18, its airframe was almost entirely composed of wood to minimise use of metals for economic reasons. The aircraft was relatively light and delivered performance matching or exceeding that of other contemporary advanced trainers, while its modular construction eased production and repair alike along with permitting the extensive involvement of non-traditional subcontractors in its manufacture. While the first prototype was lost in an accident in May 1941, Beechcraft quickly produced the refined Model 26 only three months later and received a sizable production contract for the A-10.

In addition to Beechcraft's own final assembly line for the AT-10, which produced 1,771 aircraft before being closed in 1943, the Texan firm Globe Aircraft also produced an additional 600 AT-10s under license. While most aircraft were flown by the military, the type was rapidly withdrawn at the end of the conflict and numerous examples were sold to civilians, although these were not typically flown but broken up to recover components instead. The aircraft's wooden construction led to deterioration unless correctly stored, thus only a single intact aircraft has been preserved at the National Museum of the United States Air Force.

== Development ==
Lines of AT-10s in a hangar at Turner Army Airfield, circa 1944

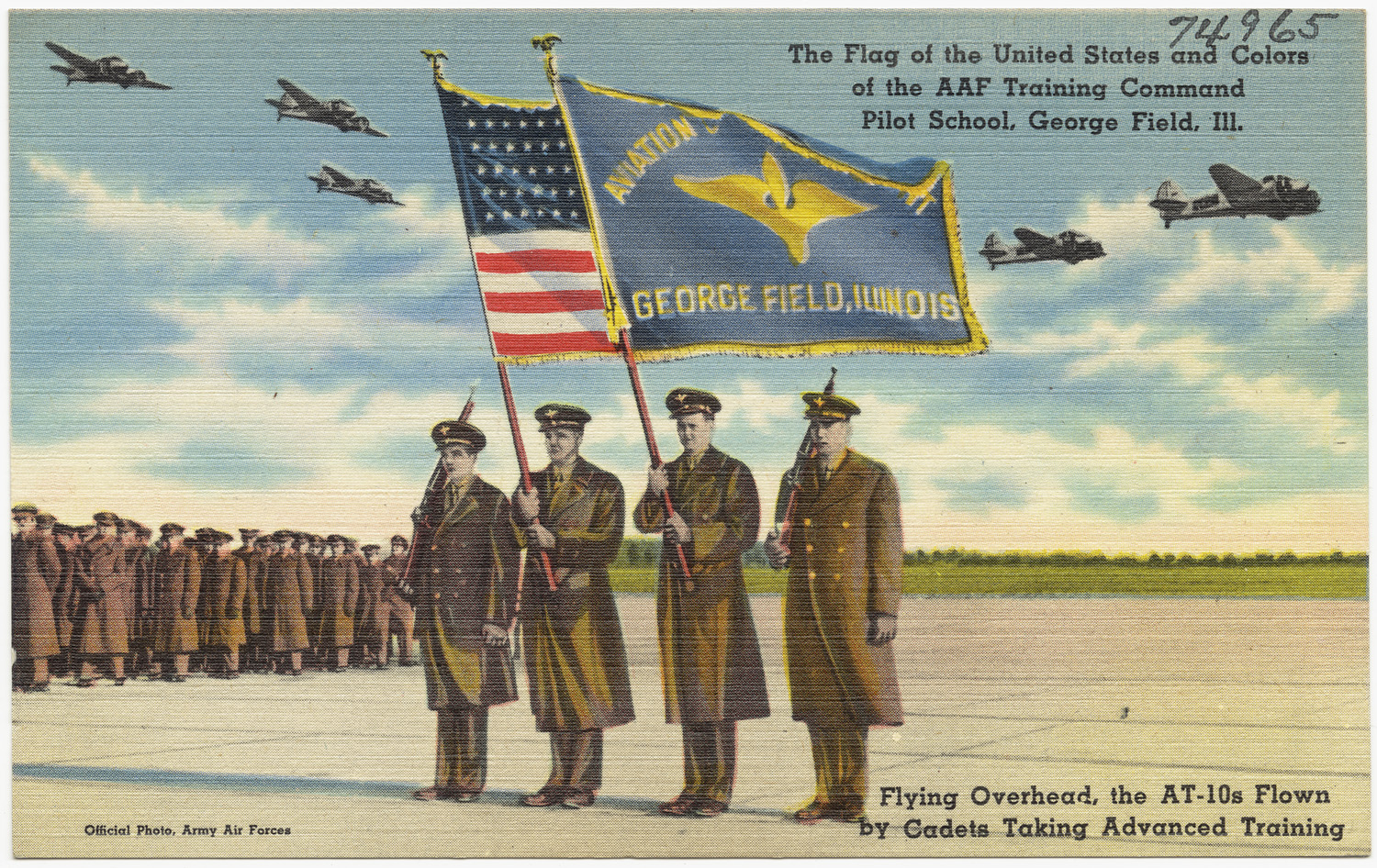
"The flag of the United States and colors of the AAF Training Command Pilot School, George Field, Ill, flying overhead, the AT-10s flown by cadets taking advanced training."

By 1940, the US government was in the process of substantially expanding its armed forces in response to the increasingly likelihood that the country would be directly involved in World War II. To this end, the United States Army Air Corps (USAAC) foresaw a need to expand its ability to train pilots for its combat aircraft and recognising that its traditional apporach of using obsolte bombers for training bomber crews, quickly explored the use of other aircraft for this mission. While both the Cessna AT-8 and the Curtiss-Wright AT-9 Jeep were quickly procured and evaluated, these aircraft were deemed to be not fully satisfactory, and thus the USAAC formulated a requirement for a dedicated multi-engined training aircraft that would be suitable for this role.

Amongst the parties to respond to the requirement was the American manufacturer Beechcraft, which quickly designed a clean-sheet aircraft to fulfil this opportunity that was internally designated as the Model 25. The design of this aircraft was greatly shaped by one of the stipulations of the requirement, which was that the aircraft's construction should involve only a minimal amount of essential materiels, such as aluminium. Accordingly, Beechcraft had designed the basic structure of their aircraft entirely from plywood. Even the fuel tanks were composed of wood, and lined with neoprene (a form of synthetic rubber). Only 1.6 percent of the airframe's gross weight was made up of metal, which was isolated to key areas, such as the engine cowling and the frame around the cockpit.

Furthermore, the aircraft's construction was designed to be modular, which permitted its components to be more readily manufactured, transported, and repaired. One key advantage of its wooden construction was that companies not traditionally involved in the aviation sector, such as furniture manufacturers, could be reasonably included in the aircraft's production effort. The extensive use of wood made the aircraft fairly lightweight and positively impacted its performance, which was reportedly competitive amongst contemporary advanced twin-engine trainers of the era. Some of the aircraft's aerodynamic features were shared with the earlier Beechcraft Model 18. The company's design choices enabled it to extensively subcontract production of the aircraft to various entities, which led to less than 15 percent of the aircraft's manufacturing cycle actually being performed by Beechcraft, whose role was effectively limited to the final assembly process alone.

Following the submission of its proposal, Beechcraft promptly received a contract to produce the Model 25, which received the service deisngation AT-10 Wichita. The Model 25 prototype was delivered to the USAAC for evaluation in early 1941, but it was destroyed in a crash on 5 May of that year. The following day, Beechcraft began work on the Model 26, which was soon ready, making its first flight on 19 July of that same year. The type was accepted and deliveries began to the United States Army Air Forces (USAAF) in February 1942, by which time the US's military fortunes were at their nadir.

The aircraft was named "Wichita" after Wichita, Kansas, the location of the Beechcraft factory. By the end of 1942, 748 aircraft had been delivered and were playing a part in training crews for the vast fleets of bomber and transport aircraft that were pouring off factory production lines all over the United States. Recognising Beechcraft's heavy wartime work commitments, a license to produce the AT-10 was issued to the Texas-based manufacturer Globe Aircraft, which established a separate final assembly line for the type.

Production of the A-10 by Beechcraft was terminated in 1943, by which point the company had delivered 1,771 aircraft. Globe Aircraft produced another 600 AT-10s before all construction finally ceased during the following year. The type remained in service through to the end of the conflict but was quickly withdrawn in the postwar years. Numerous surplus aircraft were sold into the civil sector, but these were typically broken up for their components rather than flown.

One long term disadvantage of the AT-10's extensive use of wood was that many airframes deterorated over time if not stored inside.

== Operators ==
United States

- United States Army Air Forces

== Surviving aircraft ==
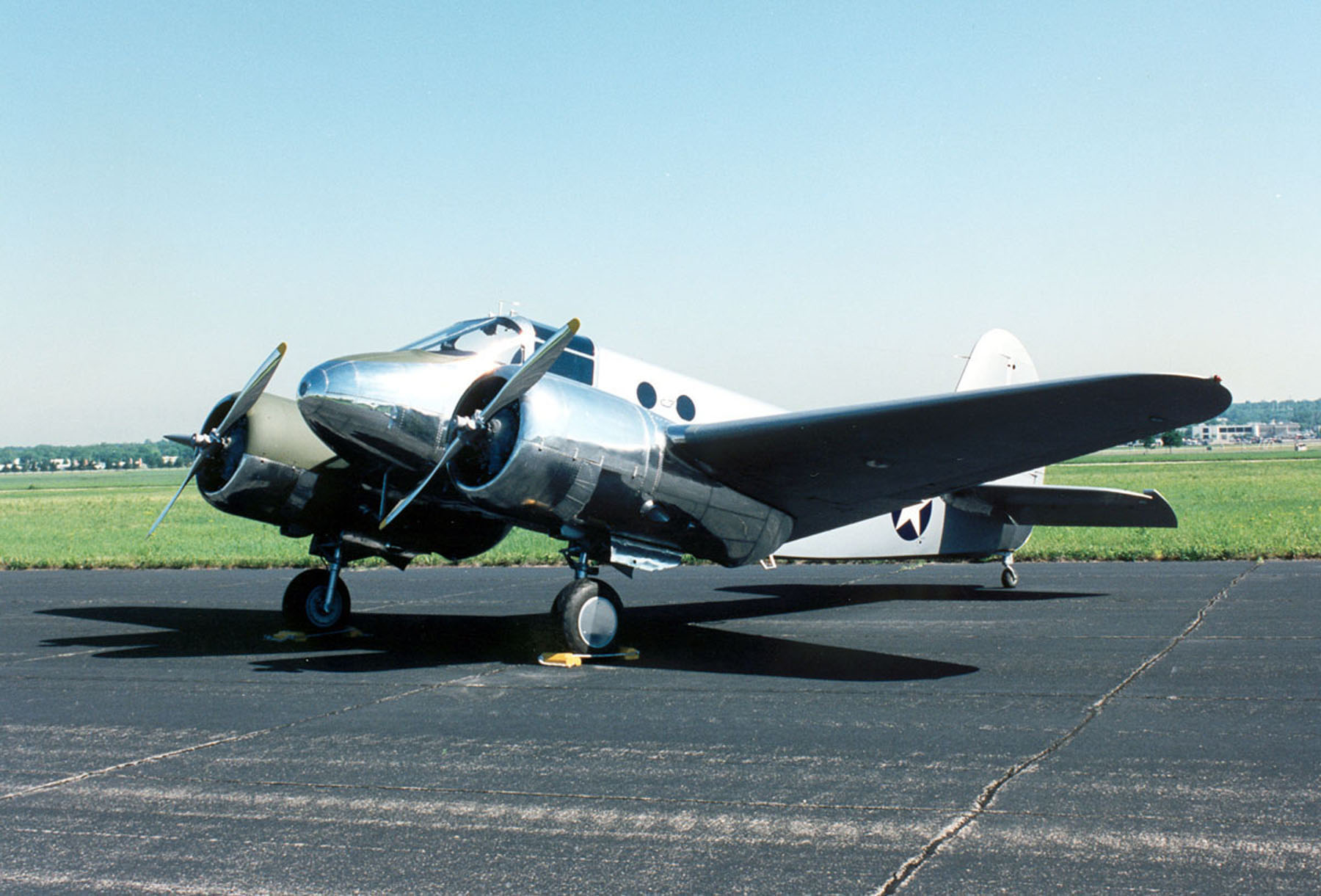
Beechcraft AT-10 Wichita at the National Museum of the United States Air Force

- 41-27322 – AT-10 under restoration by AirCorps Aviation for the Cadet Air Corps Museum.
- 42-35143 – AT-10 on static display at the National Museum of the United States Air Force in Dayton, Ohio.

== Specifications ==
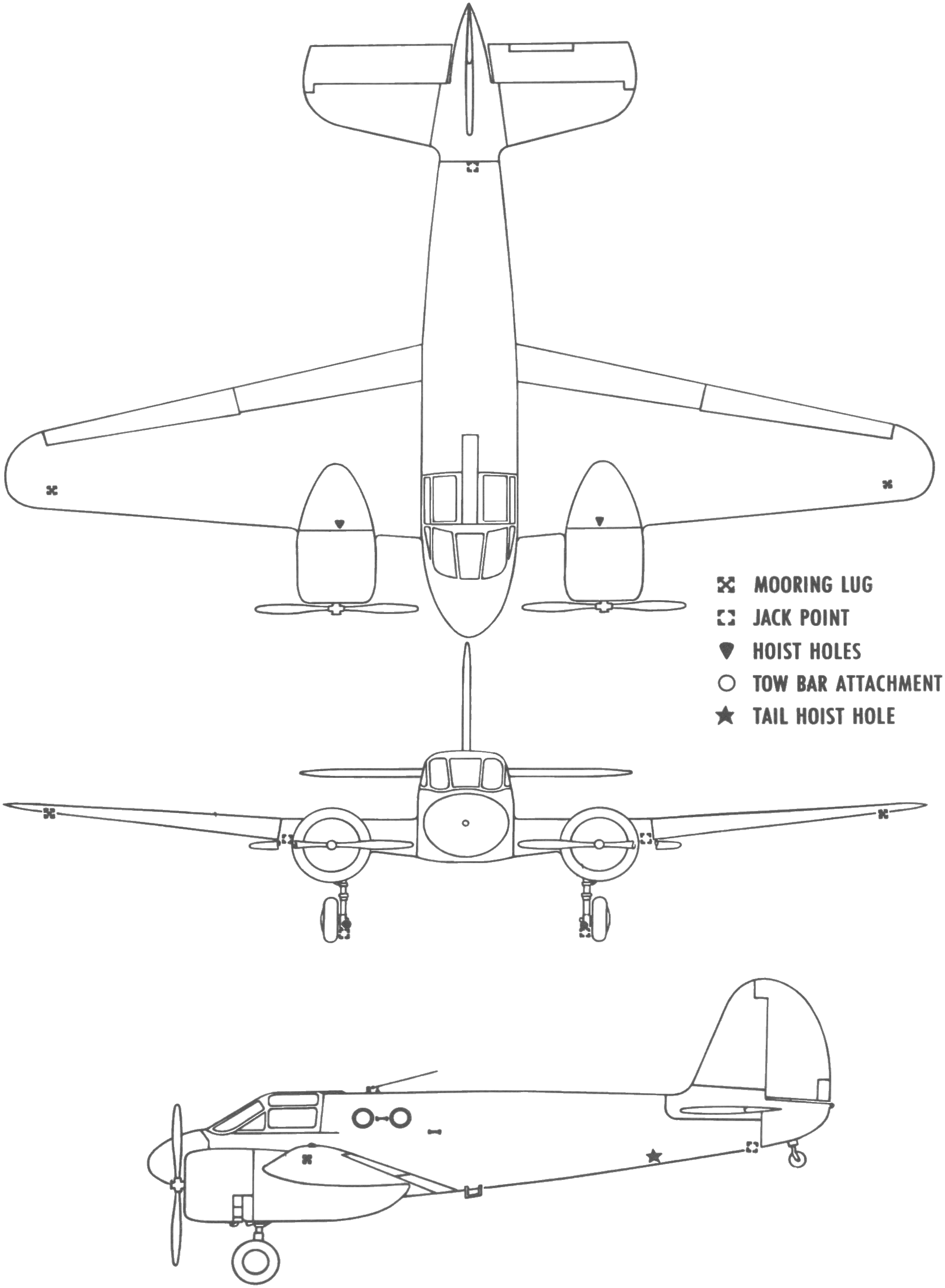
3-view line drawing of the Beechcraft AT-10 Wichita

Data from American Warplanes of World War II, American Military Training Aircraft: Fixed and Rotary-Wing Trainers Since 1916

General characteristics

- Crew: Two
- Length: 34 ft 4 in (10.46 m)
- Wingspan: 44 ft 0 in (13.41 m)
- Height: 10 ft 4 in (3.15 m)
- Wing area: 298 sq ft (27.7 m^{2})
- Empty weight: 4,750 lb (2,155 kg)
- Max takeoff weight: 6,130 lb (2,781 kg)
- Powerplant: 2 × Lycoming R-680-9 air-cooled radial engines, 295 hp (220 kW) each

Performance

- Maximum speed: 198 mph (319 km/h, 172 kn)
- Cruise speed: 168 mph (270 km/h, 146 kn) (75% power)
- Range: 770 mi (1,240 km, 670 nmi)
- Service ceiling: 16,900 ft (5,200 m)
- Rate of climb: 1,150 ft/min (5.8 m/s)

== See also ==
Aircraft of comparable role, configuration, and era

- Airspeed Oxford
- Avro Anson
- Cessna AT-17
- Curtiss AT-9

Related lists

- List of aircraft of World War II
