= Frankfort OQ-16 =

OQ-16 TD3D

General information
- Type: Target drone
- National origin: United States
- Manufacturer: Frankfort Sailplane Company
- Primary users: United States Navy United States Army Air Forces
- Number built: 0

The Frankfort OQ-16, also known as the TD3D, was a target drone designed by the Frankfort Sailplane Company for use by the United States Army Air Forces and United States Navy.

The OQ-16 was developed under a contract for a radio-controlled target drone awarded in early 1945. Fifteen aircraft were ordered by the USAAF; later in the year the contract was transferred to the United States Navy, which assigned the designation TD3D-1 to the type. However, the contract was canceled before any of the aircraft were built.

== Specifications ==
Data from Parsch 2003

General characteristics

- Crew: 0
- Wingspan: 12 ft (3.7 m)
- Gross weight: 135 lb (61 kg)
- Powerplant: 1 × Righter O-45-35 , 35 hp (26 kW)

Performance

- Maximum speed: 150 mph (240 km/h, 130 kn)
- Endurance: 60 minutes
- Service ceiling: 15,000 ft (4,600 m)

== See also ==
Aircraft of comparable role, configuration, and era

- Radioplane OQ-14
- Radioplane OQ-17

Related lists

- List of military aircraft of the United States
- List of United States Navy aircraft designations (pre-1962)
