= Globe KD4G Quail =

American target drone

KD4G Quail
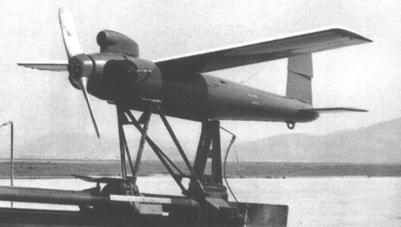
- KD4G-1

General information
- Type: Target drone
- National origin: United States
- Manufacturer: Globe Aircraft Corporation
- Primary user: United States Navy

History
- First flight: 1949

The Globe KD4G Quail was an American target drone, built by the Globe Aircraft Corporation for use by the United States Navy.

== Design and development ==
A catapult-launched, high-wing monoplane, the KD4G was of all-metal construction. The Quail was launched by a catapult; power was supplied by a two-cylinder Kiekhaefer O-45 opposed piston engine producing 35 horsepower (26 kW).

== Operational history ==
The KD4G-1 first flew in 1949; soon afterwards an improved version, the KD4G-2, was introduced, however neither variant was produced in significant numbers.
