= Radioplane OQ-17 =

1940s American target drone

OQ-17 KDD Quail
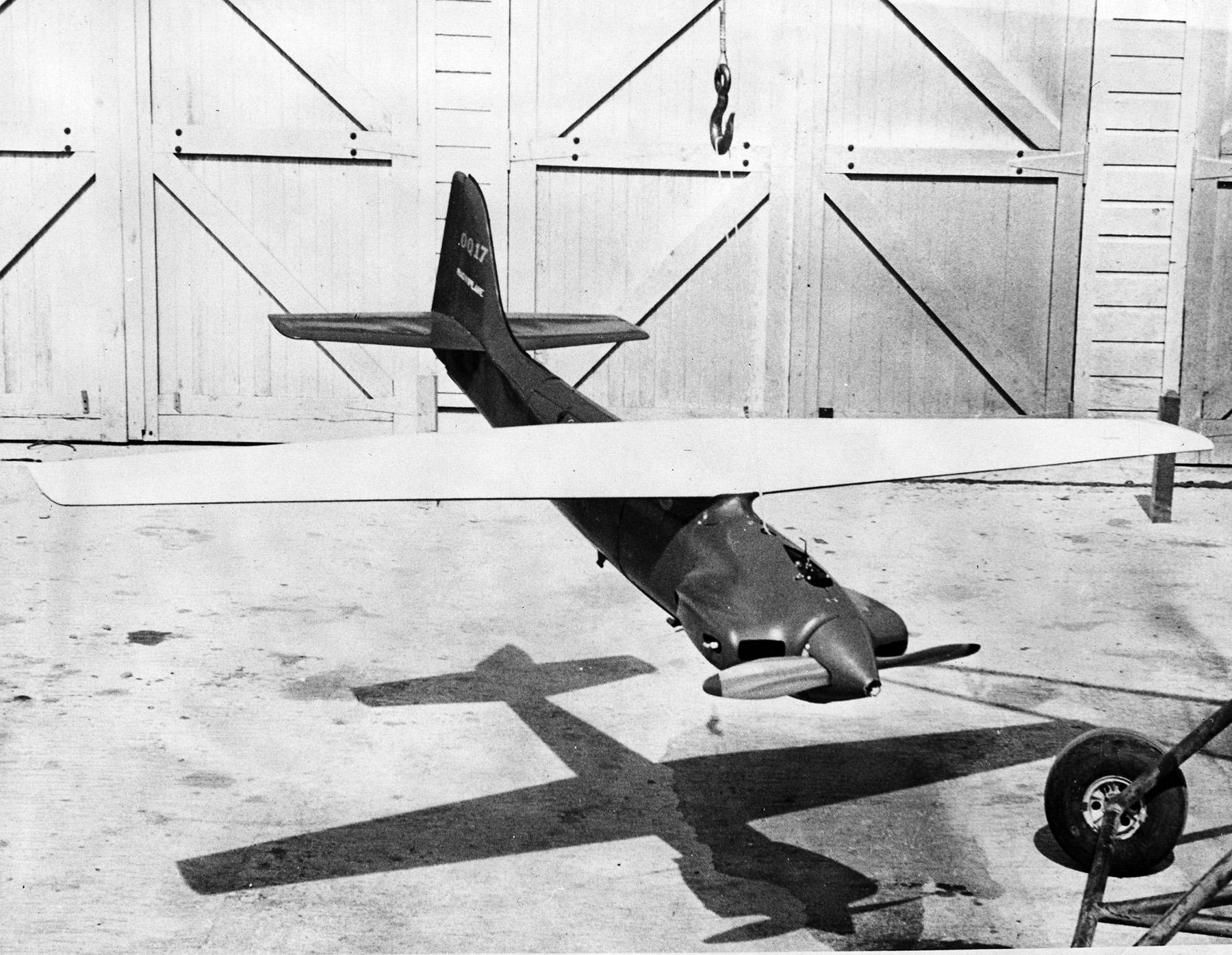

General information
- Type: Target drone
- National origin: United States
- Manufacturer: Radioplane Company
- Designer: Reginald Denny
- Primary users: United States Army Air Forces United States Navy
- Number built: 430

History
- Developed into: Radioplane OQ-19

The Radioplane OQ-17 was a target drone produced by the Radioplane Company for the United States Army Air Forces and, as the TD4D/KDR Quail, the United States Navy. Suffering from an unreliable engine, the OQ-17 production run was cut short in favor of the OQ-19.

== Design and development ==
As the end of World War II approached, the U.S. Army Air Forces issued a requirement for a new target drone to replace the Radioplane OQ-2 family of drones, with higher performance to better simulate the improved capabilities of combat aircraft. The RP-18, designed by Radioplane's Reginald Denny in response, was of all-metal construction, with a high-mounted wing and conventional empennage. Power was supplied by a Righter O-45 four-cylinder horizontially-opposed engine, and launch was via catapult. Control was maintained through conventional radio control, while if the drone was not shot down by the gunners using it for training, it could be recovered via an onboard parachute. It was claimed that the OQ-17 could perform any maneuver that an ordinary fighter aircraft could.

== Operational history ==
Evaluation of the RP-18 began in March 1945; following trials, the U.S. Army Air Forces ordered the drone into production in February 1946, designating it OQ-17. The U.S. Navy also ordered the drone; it had been evaluated as the XTD4D-1, but before entering service the production TD4D-1 was given the new designation of KDR-1 Quail.

Production of the OQ-17 and KDR was terminated after 430 aircraft had been completed, as persistent reliability issues with the O-45 engine could not be overcome; the Radioplane OQ-19 was ordered as a replacement.

== Variants and operators ==
- RP-18 - Original prototype version.
- XOQ-17 - U.S. Army Air Forces (USAAF) designation for testbed RP-18s.
- OQ-17 - USAAF; production version of XOQ-17.
- XTD4D-1 - U.S. Navy (USN) designation for testbed RP-18s.
- TD4D-1 - USN; original designation for production version of XTD4D-1
- KDR-1 - USN; definitive designation for production version of XTD4D-1.
- KDR-2 - USN; KDR-1 with structural improvements.

== Specifications ==
Data from Parsch 2003

General characteristics

- Crew: 0
- Length: 8 ft 4.9 in (2.563 m)
- Wingspan: 10 ft 2 in (3.10 m)
- Gross weight: 143 lb (65 kg)
- Powerplant: 1 × Righter O-45-35 , 35 hp (26 kW)

Performance

- Maximum speed: 190 mph (310 km/h, 170 kn)
- Endurance: 60 minutes
- Service ceiling: 15,000 ft (4,600 m)

== See also ==
Related development

- Radioplane OQ-19

Aircraft of comparable role, configuration, and era

- Radioplane OQ-14
- Frankfort OQ-16

Related lists

- List of military aircraft of the United States
- List of United States Navy aircraft designations (pre-1962)
