= Curtiss KD2C Skeet =

Cancelled target drone program

KD2C Skeet
- Curtiss-Wright KD2C Skeet on display at the Steven F. Udvar-Hazy Center

General information
- Type: Target drone
- National origin: United States
- Manufacturer: Curtiss-Wright

History
- First flight: 1947

The Curtiss-Wright KD2C Skeet is an American target drone produced by Curtiss-Wright for the United States Navy that began development in 1945. The KD2C-1 first flew in 1947; however, it was found unsatisfactory and the program was cancelled in 1949.

== Design and development ==
The KD2C was a target drone, powered by a pulsejet engine and intended for air-launch for use in fleet gunnery training. The KD2C-1 was powered by a Continental pulsejet engine, 14 inches (360 mm) in diameter; the KD2C-2 used a McDonnell J-9 or J-11 pulsejet of the same diameter. Control was provided by a radio command system, assisted by a gyrostabilizer. The KD2N could reach a top speed of 335 miles per hour (539 km/h) and had an endurance of 30 minutes.

== Operational history ==
Begun in August 1945, the first prototype KD2C flew for the first time in 1947. The Skeet's internally mounted pulsejet proved unsatisfactory, however, as it produced low speed and high fuel consumption in both wind tunnel and flight tests at the Navy's Missile Test Center at Point Mugu, California. As a result, the KD2C program was cancelled in 1949, and the last of the produced aircraft were out of service by 1951.

== Surviving aircraft ==
The U.S. Navy donated a surviving KD2C-2 to the National Air and Space Museum in 1971; it is on display in the Steven F. Udvar-Hazy Center.

== Variants ==
KD2C-1
Baseline model with Continental pulsejet engine.

KD2C-2
Modified KD2C-1 with McDonnell pulsejet engine.

XKD3C-1
Developed KD2C with improved engine.

== Specifications (KD2C-2) ==
Data from

General characteristics

- Crew: None
- Length: 17 ft (5.2 m)
- Wingspan: 10 ft 6 in (3.20 m)
- Gross weight: 1,258 lb (571 kg)
- Powerplant: 1 × 14-inch (356 mm) pulsejet, 282 lbf (1.25 kN) thrust

Performance

- Maximum speed: 335 mph (539 km/h, 291 kn)
- Endurance: 30 minutes

== See also ==
Aircraft of comparable role, configuration, and era

- Globe KD2G Firefly
- McDonnell TD2D Katydid
- NAMU KDN Gorgon

Related lists

- List of unmanned aerial vehicles
