= McDonnell TD2D Katydid =

American target drone

TD2D Katydid
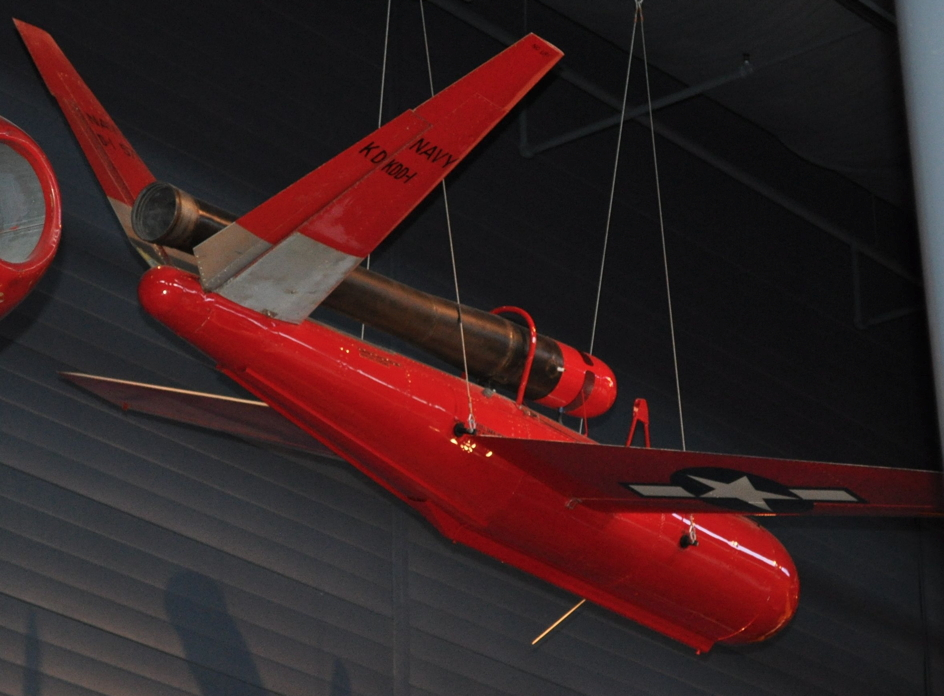
- McDonnell KDD-1 on display at the Steven F. Udvar-Hazy Center

General information
- Type: Target drone
- National origin: United States
- Manufacturer: McDonnell Aircraft
- Primary user: United States Navy

History
- First flight: 1942

The McDonnell TD2D Katydid (company designation McDonnell Model 31) is a pulsejet-powered American target drone produced by McDonnell Aircraft that entered service with the United States Navy in 1942, and continued in use until the late 1940s.

== History ==
In March 1941, the U. S. Navy awarded McDonnell Aircraft a contract for a radio-controlled target drone under the designation of XTD2D-1 for anti-aircraft and aerial gunnery practice. The aircraft had a mid-mounted wing, V-tail, and McDonnell XPJ40-MD-2 pulsejet engine mounted atop the rear fuselage. The drone could be either launched by catapult from the ground or from underwing racks on Consolidated PBY Catalina flying boats. It was gyro-stabilized, and control was by radio command; at the end of its mission the drone could be recovered by parachute.

== Operational history ==
The Katydid entered service in 1942; testing took place at the Naval Air Missile Test Center in Point Mugu, California. Production models were originally designated TD2D-1, however the Navy changed its designation system in 1946 and the XTD2D-1 and TD2D-1 were redesignated as XKDD-1 and KDD-1, respectively. Later that year, the Navy changed McDonnell's manufacturer code letter from "D" - which had been shared with Douglas Aircraft - to "H", the KDD-1 being again redesignated, as KDH-1.

== Surviving aircraft ==
A KDH-1 is displayed in the Steven F. Udvar-Hazy Center of the National Air and Space Museum, having been donated by the U.S. Navy in 1966.

== Specifications (KDD-1) ==
Data from Udvar-Hazy Center, Parsch 2003

General characteristics

- Crew: None
- Length: 11 ft 2 in (3.40 m)
- Wingspan: 12 ft (3.7 m)
- Gross weight: 320 lb (145 kg)
- Powerplant: 1 × McDonnell XPJ40-MD-2 pulsejet, 60 lbf (0.27 kN) thrust

Performance

- Maximum speed: 250 mph (400 km/h, 220 kn)
- Endurance: 40 minutes

== See also ==
Aircraft of comparable role, configuration, and era

- Curtiss KD2C Skeet
- Globe KD2G Firefly
- NAMU KDN Gorgon

Related lists

- List of unmanned aerial vehicles
