= Globe KD2G Firefly =

American pulsejet target drone

KD2G Firefly
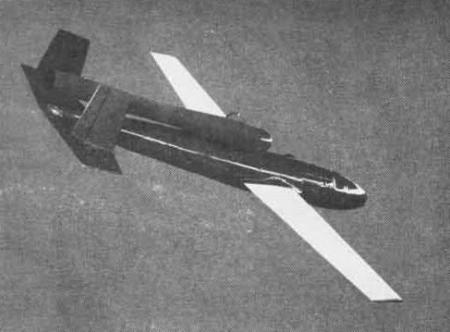
- KD2G-1

General information
- Type: Target drone
- National origin: United States
- Manufacturer: Globe Aircraft Corporation
- Primary user: United States Navy

History
- First flight: 1946
- Retired: ~1954
- Developed from: Globe KDG Snipe
- Developed into: Globe KD6G Firefly

The Globe KD2G Firefly is a pulsejet-powered American target drone, built by the Globe Aircraft Corporation for operation by the United States Navy in the late 1940s, seeing operational use into the mid-1950s.

== Design and development ==
The KD2G was a mid-wing, twin-tailed aircraft of similar design to the KDG Snipe which Globe was already supplying to the Navy. A single McDonnell PJ42 pulsejet engine was mounted atop the rear of the fuselage. The fuselage was constructed of steel tubing with a duralumin monocoque covering; dural was also used for the flying surfaces. The KD2G was equipped with radio control with an effective range of 6,000 yards (5,500 m); it could be launched using a catapult, or launched aerially from JD-1 or F7F-2D aircraft. Recovery, if it survived its mission, was by a 32-foot (9.8 m) diameter parachute; the Firefly was designed to be able to float for up to 15 minutes in the event of a water landing.

== Operational history ==
First flying as the XKD2G-1 prototype during 1946, the KD2G-1 entered service with the United States Navy during 1947. The improved KD2G-2, powered by a Solar PJ32 pulsejet, began production in 1950; it was the first successful jet-powered target drone to be developed following the end of World War II. The KD2G remained in service through the mid-1950s, being replaced by the KD6G.

== Variants ==
XKD2G-1
Prototype with McDonnell PJ42 engine.

KD2G-1
Production version of XKD2G-1 with 28-volt electrical system.

KD2G-2
Improved production model with Solar PJ32 engine.

== Surviving aircraft ==
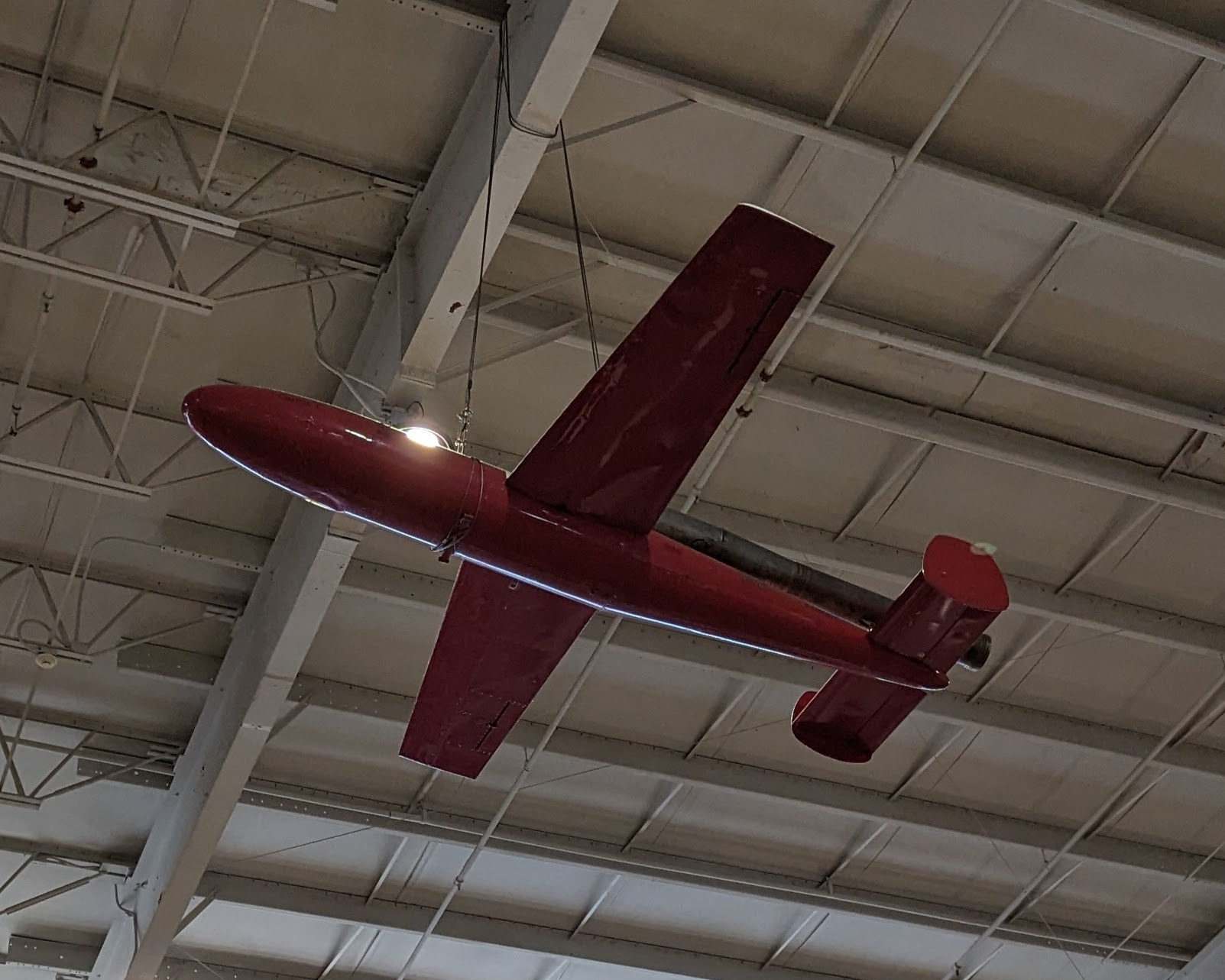
A KD2G-2 hanging from the ceiling of the Aircraft Pavilion at Battleship Memorial Park in Mobile, Alabama

A KD2G-2 is displayed at the Aircraft Pavilion of the Battleship Memorial Park in Mobile, Alabama.

== Specifications (KD2G-2) ==
Data from Standard Aircraft Characteristics

General characteristics

- Crew: None
- Length: 12 ft 3 in (3.73 m)
- Wingspan: 11 ft 8 in (3.56 m)
- Height: 2 ft 3 in (0.69 m)
- Wing area: 20.66 sq ft (1.919 m^{2})
- Empty weight: 191 lb (87 kg)
- Gross weight: 311 lb (141 kg)
- Max takeoff weight: 320 lb (145 kg)
- Fuel capacity: 20 US gallons (76 L; 17 imp gal)
- Powerplant: 1 × Solar PJ32-S-4 pulsejet, 107 lbf (0.48 kN) thrust

Performance

- Maximum speed: 240 mph (390 km/h, 210 kn)
- Stall speed: 62 mph (100 km/h, 54 kn) power on
- Combat range: 100 mi (161 km, 87 nmi)
- Endurance: 26 minutes
- Rate of climb: 2,180 ft/min (11.1 m/s) at sea level
- Time to altitude: 2 minutes to 4,000 feet (1,200 m); 4.9 minutes to 8,000 feet (2,400 m)
- Wing loading: 14.9 lb/sq ft (73 kg/m^{2})

Avionics

- AN/ARW-26Y radio control system

== See also ==
Related development

- Globe KDG Snipe
- Globe KD3G Snipe
- Globe KD6G Firefly

Aircraft of comparable role, configuration, and era

- McDonnell TD2D Katydid
- NAMU KDN Gorgon
- Radioplane Q-1

Related lists

- List of unmanned aerial vehicles
