= Globe KDG Snipe =

American target drone

KDG/KD3G Snipe

General information
- Type: Target drone
- National origin: United States
- Manufacturer: Globe Aircraft Corporation
- Primary user: United States Navy

History
- First flight: 1946
- Retired: c.1954
- Developed into: Globe KD2G Firefly

The Globe KDG Snipe was an American target drone, built by the Globe Aircraft Corporation for use by the United States Navy. The KDG, and its modified version, the KD3G Snipe, served between 1946 and the early 1950s.

== Design and development ==
The KDG Snipe was a small, mid-winged target drone, operated by radio control. The Snipe was designed to be launched by use of a catapult system; if the aircraft was not destroyed during its mission, it would deploy a parachute for recovery. The KDG was powered by a McCulloch 4300 two-stroke engine; an improved version, designated KD3G, was powered by a 30 horsepower (22 kW) Kiekhaefer O-45 opposed piston engine.

== Operational history ==
The Snipe entered service with the U.S. Navy in 1946; the KDG had been retired from service by 1950. The improved KD3G model remained in service through the early 1950s.

== Variants ==
KDG-1
Basic model with McCulloch 4300 engine.
KDG-2
KDG-1 with 24-volt electrical system.
KD3G-1
KDG-1 with Kiekhaefer O-45-35 engine.
KD3G-2
KD3G-1 with 28-volt electrical system.

== Specifications (KD3G-2) ==
Data from Parsch

General characteristics

- Crew: None (target drone)
- Powerplant: 1 × Kiekhaefer O-45-35 opposed piston engine, 35 hp (26 kW)

Avionics

- AN/ARW-26Y radio control system
