= Erie-class gunboat =

1936 class of US Navy gunboats

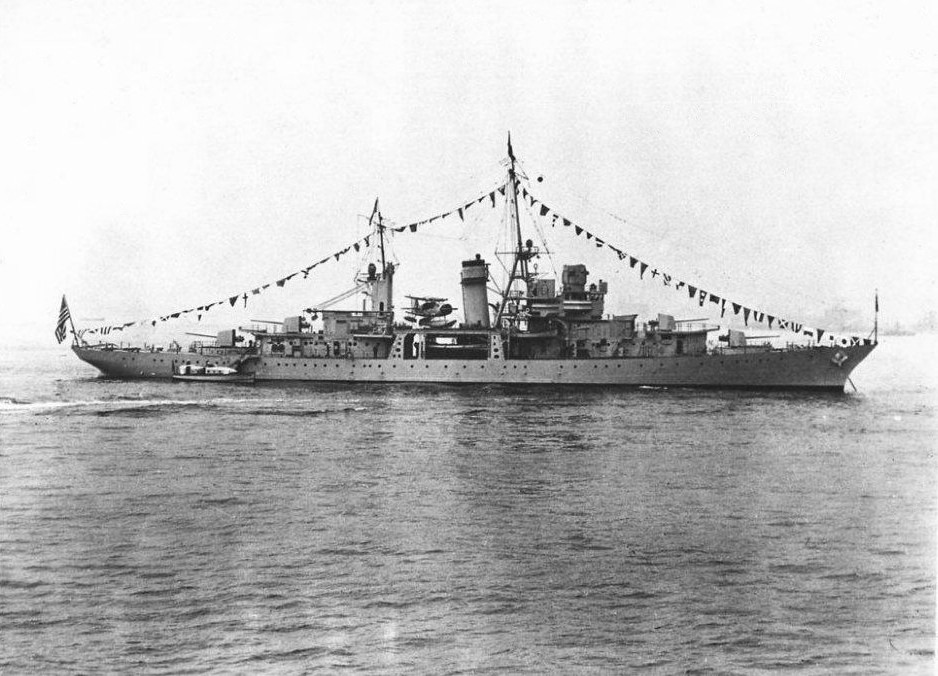
- USS Erie (PG-50)

Class overview
- Name: Erie class
- Builders: New York Navy Yard (PG-50); Charleston Navy Yard (PG-51)
- Operators: United States Navy; Massachusetts Maritime Academy 1948–1957 (PG-51)
- Preceded by: Asheville class
- Succeeded by: PGM-1 class
- Built: 1934–1936
- In commission: 1936–1945
- Planned: 2
- Completed: 2
- Lost: 1
- Retired: 1

General characteristics
- Type: Gunboat
- Displacement: 2,000 long tons (2,032 t) (standard); 2,830 long tons (2,875 t) (full load)
- Length: 328 ft 6 in (100.13 m) o.a.; 308 ft (94 m) p.p.
- Beam: 41 ft 3 in (12.57 m)
- Draft: 14 ft 10 in (4.52 m) (full load)
- Installed power: 2 × Babcock & Wilcox boilers; 6,200 shp (4,600 kW)
- Propulsion: 2 × Parsons geared single reduction steam turbines; 2 × shafts
- Speed: 20 kn (37 km/h; 23 mph)
- Range: 8,000 nmi (9,200 mi; 15,000 km) at 12 kn (22 km/h; 14 mph)
- Complement: 243
- Sensors & processing systems: Mark 3 Radar (mounted atop battery director); ASDIC Sonar
- Armament: 4 × 6 in (152 mm)/47 caliber Mark 17 guns; 4 × Quadruple 1.1 in (28 mm)/75 cal anti-aircraft guns (4x4); 6 × 20 mm (0.79 in) anti-aircraft guns (refit); 2 × Mark 6 Depth charge racks (each holding 15 depth charges)
- Armor: Side belt (over vital places):3.5 in (89 mm); Deck: 1.25 in (32 mm); Conning Tower: 4 in (100 mm); Gunshields: 1 in (25 mm)
- Aircraft carried: 1 × floatplane "Seagull" (original equipment, replaced in refit); 1 × floatplane "Kingfisher"
- Aviation facilities: Derrick

The Erie-class gunboats were a class of gunboats built by the United States prior to World War II. The class was designed in 1932, and commissioned into the United States Navy in 1936: Erie (PG-50) and Charleston (PG-51). The Eries had a design speed of 20 knots (37 km/h; 23 mph) and a main armament of four 6-inch (152 mm) guns in single mounts with four 1.1-inch (28 mm) quadruple mount anti-aircraft guns.

== Development ==
In 1930, during the London Naval Conference, Chief of Naval Operations Admiral William V. Pratt, successfully argued for an additional class of naval surface combatants that would not be limited in the number that could be constructed. They would be defined as a sloop, per Article VIII (b) of the Treaty. The new class of ships could not exceed 2,000 long tons (2,000 t) of displacement, they would have a limit of 20 knots (37 km/h; 23 mph) maximum cruising speed, their armament would be limited to no more than four guns above 3.1-inch (79 mm) in caliber, but not to exceed 6.1-inch (155 mm) in caliber, and they could not mount any torpedo tubes.

It was proposed that the Eries could be used in a large number of roles, including: screening the fleet against enemy submarines and destroyers, anti-submarine warfare during convoy duty, tactical control of fleet submarines, support of destroyer attacks, antiaircraft duty for slower carriers, high-speed mine laying, and support of amphibious landing operations. They could also relieve destroyers, that were in short supply at the time, the 6-inch guns could be useful against merchant raiders, and with its shallow draft and heavy firepower they could be used to "show the flag" in Central and South American and Far East ports during peacetime.

In late January 1931, Admiral Pratt put in an informal requested that Construction & Engineering start preliminary designs. Originally, the ship was to be used in Central American service, but with the Japanese invasion of Manchuria in 1931, along with other expansion attempts in the area, the ships mission was expanded to protecting US interest in the Far East as well.

Between August 1931 and 7 September 1932, seven preliminary schemes, lettered A through G, were drawn up. The General Board recommend at its November 1932 meeting that a 2,000-ton gunboat be built based on a modified version of scheme G. The ship would feature a clipper bow with a counter stern. The main batteries would be four single mounted 6-inch guns of either 47 or 48 caliber with two mounted fore and two mounted aft. A single floatplane, located amidships, which would be offloaded and retrieved by crane, was also added at Adm. Pratt's insistence.

== Funding ==
US President Herbert Hoover called for a special session of the United States Congress in July 1930, to ratify the terms of the London Treaty. With Congress ratifying the treaty on 21 July, the Navy and Congress had the expectation that the Navy would be built up to the treaty limits. It was soon realized by Adm. Pratt that with the worsening economy and pacifist president Hoover, the construction of new or replacement ships would be severely limited. That December, Adm. Pratt reported to Congress that the buildup to the treaty limits would not be able to occur before 1936, and would cost in excess of $1 billion, if authorized. Even worsening economic conditions and concern with the 1932 national elections, the fate of naval construction in the US was sealed. Not a single new ship was authorized for construction during Hoover's presidential term, and he even cut the limited funds that had been appropriated for construction in fiscal year 1932, suspended all construction in fiscal year 1933, and compelled the Navy to reduce operational expenses severely.

With the election of Franklin D. Roosevelt as president in November 1932, neither the building up of the US Navy to the limits of the London Naval treaty, nor the construction of any Erie-class gunboats, seemed like a sure thing. Roosevelt had expressed support for an adequate navy during the election campaign but had never really elaborated on his position. It would be left up to Claude Swanson, Roosevelt's appointed Secretary of the Navy, and Carl Vinson, Chairman of the House Naval Affairs Committee, to begin advocating for the buildup of the Navy to the limits of the London Naval Treaty, even before Roosevelt's inauguration in March 1933.

In order to gain Congressional and Presidential approval of funding, for a navy that they felt concern for both the age of vessels in the US fleet and the lack of new ship construction, they made some fairly simple economic arguments. Stressing, both publicly and privately, that new ship construction would enhance employment figures substantively because shipyard records indicated that 85% of construction funds were spent on labor costs and that if the anticipated public works funding program, National Industrial Recovery Act (NIRA), were used for ship construction the contracts for new ships could be awarded within 90 days of authorization with actual construction beginning almost immediately thereafter.

When Roosevelt signed NIRA into law on 16 June 1933, he had been convinced that it would be used to fund construction of new ships to create jobs in both public and private shipyards. Section 209(e) allowed for the President, within the terms and conditions of the London Naval Treaty of 1930, to authorize the construction of naval vessels. That same day Roosevelt signed an executive order giving approval to the expenditure of $238 million, over three years, for the construction of 32 new ships, this also included provisions for two Erie-class gunboats.

Henry L. Roosevelt, Assistant Secretary of the Navy, announced, within a week of NIRA being signed, that the construction of the two Erie-class gunboats would be awarded to the New York Naval Yard and the Charleston Naval Yard, at a cost reported anywhere from $2 million and $4 million, in various press accounts. Later, in December 1937, at hearings before the House Appropriations Committee, it was reported by the Navy Department that the cost of the Eries construction and machinery was actually $4,700,216, with her armor, armament and ammunition costing an addition $1,347,000, for a total cost of $6,047,216. In less than 90 days, 1 September 1933, the contracts for the construction of all 32 NIRA funded vessels, and their names, was announced by the Navy Department.

== Design ==
The Erie class had a standard displacement of 2,000 long tons with a service displacement of 2,830 long tons (2,875 t). They were 328 ft 6 in (100.13 m) in length overall, while they were 308 ft (94 m) at the waterline. They had an extreme beam of 41 ft 3 in (12.57 m) with a mean draft of 11 ft 4 in (3.45 m) at standard displacement.

The Eries were powered by two Babcock and Wilcox boilers driving two Parsons geared turbine that produced 6,200 shp (4,600 kW).

They were armed with four new model 6-inch/47 caliber Mark 17 guns, that were only used in the Eries, the main difference being that they used manually-loaded bagged charges with separate shells, rather than the single-piece cased shells used on the Mark 16 guns with mechanical loaders. Their anti-aircraft armament originally consisted of only four quadruple 1.1-inch (28 mm)/75 caliber guns; these were later augmented with the addition of four 20-millimetre (0.79 in) Oerlikon cannons. The Eries were also equipped with two Mark 6 depth charge roll-off racks that could hold 15 depth charges each.

Since the London Treaty did not specify that armor plating could not be used Navy officials decided that armor plating was allowed. They were not completely armored but they did have some. There was a 3 1/2-inch (89 mm) side belt armor over the vital spaces. The 6-inch guns were protected by 1-inch (25 mm) armor gun shields. They had 1 1/4-inch (32 mm) armor on the main deck and 4-inch (100 mm) armor on the conning tower.

== Ships in class ==
| Name | Hull no. | Shipyard | Laid down | Launched | Commissioned | Decommissioned | Fate |
|---|---|---|---|---|---|---|---|
| Erie | PG-50 | New York Navy Yard, Brooklyn, New York | 17 December 1934 | 29 February 1936 | 1 July 1936 | 28 July 1943 (struck) | Torpedoed by U-163 on 10 November 1942 resulting in severe damage and beaching. Later towed to port but capsized on 5 December 1942. |
| Charleston | PG-51 | Charleston Navy Yard, Charleston, South Carolina | 27 October 1934 | 25 February 1936 | 8 July 1936 | 10 May 1946 | Served as training ship for the Massachusetts Maritime Academy from 1948 to 1959. Later scrapped. |

== Bibliography ==
- "U.S.S. ERIE: SHIP SPECIFICATIONS". U.S.S. ERIE (PG-50). USS Erie.org.
- "SHIP HISTORY". U.S.S. ERIE (PG-50). USS Erie.org.
- "Chronology 1930". League of Nations Photo Archive. Indiana University.

== See also ==
- Treasury-class cutter - Class of seven USCG cutters built between 1936 & 1937 based on the Erie-class gunboat.
