= USS Erie (PG-50) =

American Navy gunboat

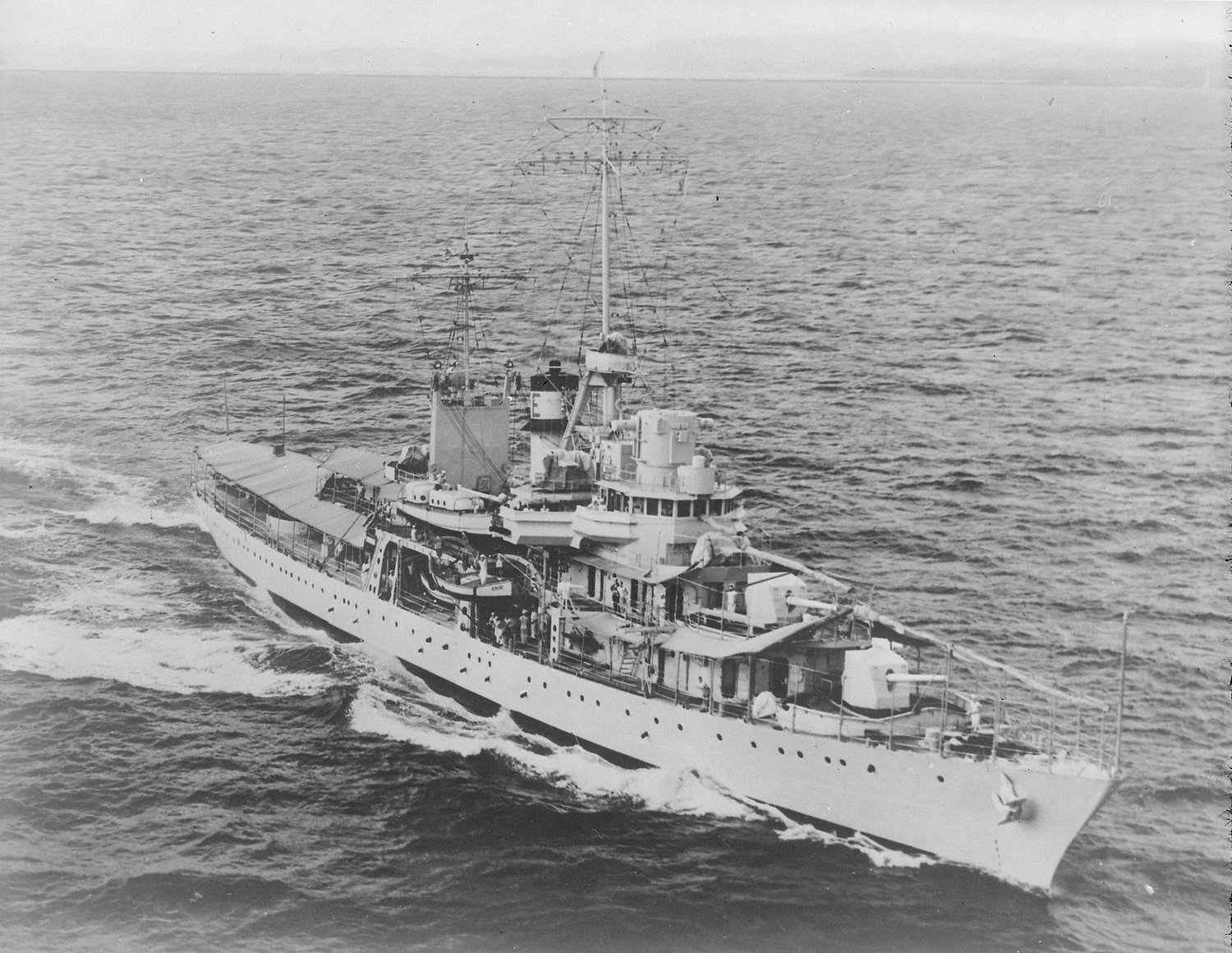
- USS Erie in 1940

History

United States
- Name: Erie
- Namesake: City of Erie, Pennsylvania
- Ordered: 1 November 1933
- Builder: New York Navy Yard, Brooklyn, New York
- Cost: $6,047,216
- Way number: Dry Dock #1
- Laid down: 17 December 1934
- Launched: 29 February 1936
- Sponsored by: Mrs. Edmund A. Knoll
- Commissioned: 1 July 1936
- Stricken: 28 July 1943
- Identification: Hull symbol: PG-50
- Honors and awards: 1 Battle Stars; American Defense Service Medal with "FLEET" clasp; American Campaign Medal; World War II Victory Medal
- Fate: Torpedoed and beached, 12 November 1942; Capsized during attempted salvage, 5 December 1942

General characteristics
- Class & type: Erie-class gunboat
- Displacement: 2,000 long tons (2,032 t) (standard); 2,830 long tons (2,875 t) (full load)
- Length: 328 ft 6 in (100.13 m) o.a.; 308 ft (94 m) p.p.
- Beam: 41 ft 3 in (12.57 m)
- Draft: 14 ft 10 in (4.52 m) (full load)
- Installed power: 2 × Babcock & Wilcox boilers; 6,200 shp (4,600 kW)
- Propulsion: 2 × Parsons geared single reduction steam turbines; 2 × shafts
- Speed: 20 kn (37 km/h; 23 mph)
- Range: 8,000 nmi (15,000 km; 9,200 mi) at 12 kn (22 km/h; 14 mph)
- Complement: 213
- Sensors & processing systems: Mark 3 Fire-control radar (mounted atop battery director); ASDIC Sonar
- Armament: 4 × 6-inch (152 mm)/47 caliber Mark 17 guns; 2 × 3-pounder (47 mm (1.9 in)/47 cal) gun single mount saluting guns; 4 × 0.50 in (12.7 mm) Browning Machine Gun, Cal..50, M2, HB, single anti-aircraft (AA) guns (replaced with 1.1"/75s); 4 × 1.1 in (28 mm)/75 caliber, quadruple anti-aircraft guns; 2 × Mark 6 Depth charge racks (each holding 15 depth charges)
- Armor: Side belt (over vital places): 3.5 in (89 mm); Deck: 1.25 in (32 mm); Conning tower: 4 in (100 mm); Gunshields: 1 in (25 mm)
- Aircraft carried: 1 × floatplane "Seagull"; 1 × floatplane "Kingfisher" (replaced "Seagull")
- Aviation facilities: Derrick

USS Erie (PG-50) was the lead ship of the Erie-class gunboats of the United States Navy. Erie was the second US Navy ship to bear the name. The first, Erie, was named after Lake Erie, while this Erie followed the US Navy naming practices of gunboats, like cruisers, being named after US cities, with this Erie being named after Erie, Pennsylvania.

Erie protected US interests during the Spanish Civil War, operated as a training ship for the United States Naval Academy, and was a convoy escort ship during World War II. She operated in the Pacific Ocean, Atlantic Ocean, and Caribbean Sea until torpedoed and fatally damaged by U-163, off Curaçao, in 1942.

== Construction and commissioning ==
Erie was ordered in June 1933, and laid down at the New York Naval Shipyard on 17 December 1934. Erie was the first ship to be built in the Yard's No. 1 dry dock, instead of on a slip. For the first time at a New York Navy Yard keel-laying ceremony, the first rivets for Erie's keel were driven in by civilian employees rather than ranking Navy officers.

Within six months, by June 1935, most of the work for the hull, main deck, second deck, and platform structure had been completed. After Commander (later Vice Admiral) Edward Hanson graduated, in May 1935, from the Naval War College, he was ordered to see the fitting-out of Erie and to captain her upon commissioning. The next seven months, June 1935 to mid-January 1936, saw significant progress in the assembly of the main deck components, the navigational bridge, the pilothouse, and the chart house. By January 1936, 80% of the hull work was complete with about 50% of the equipment and machinery installed.

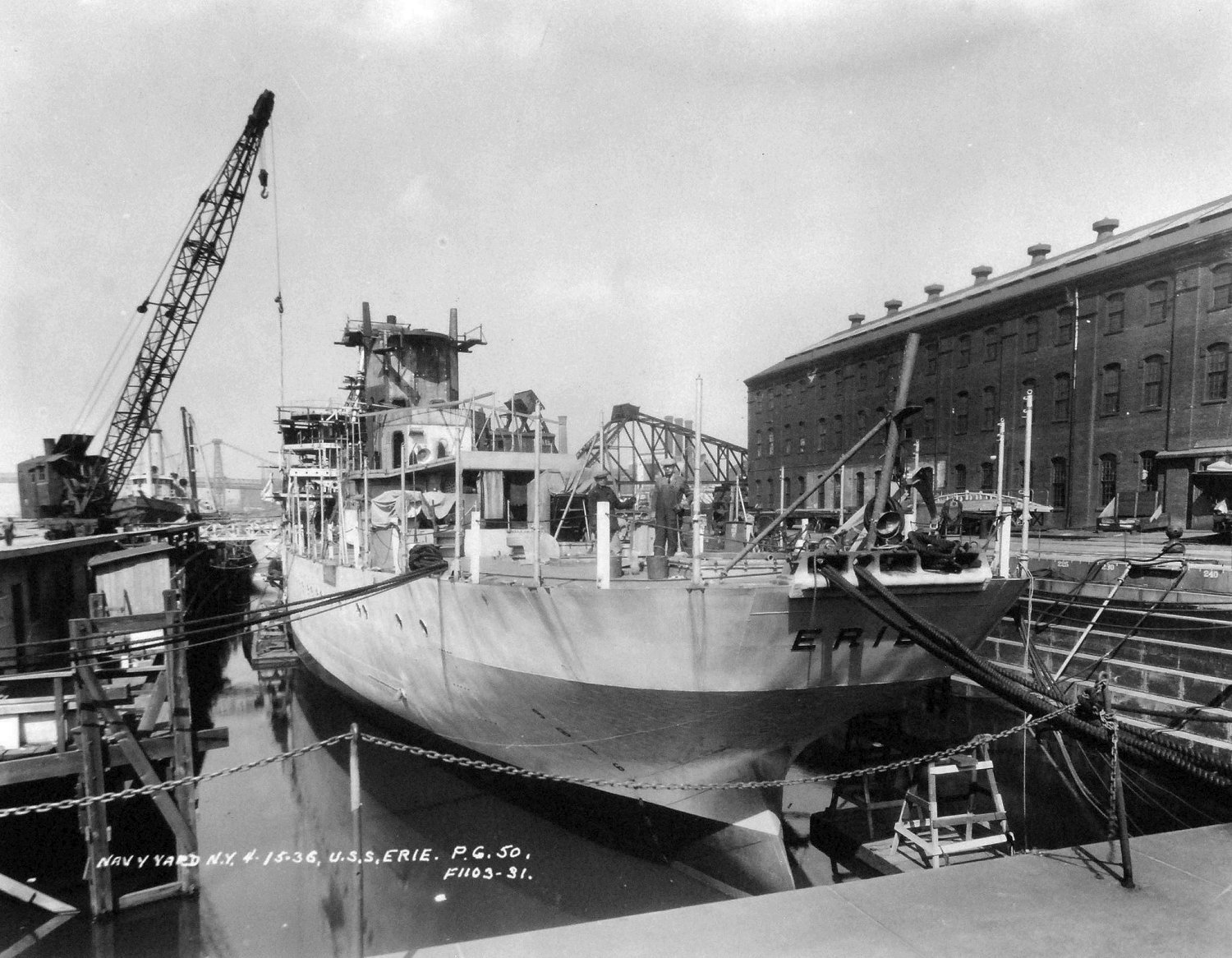
USS Erie (PG-50), 15 April 1936 New York Naval Shipyard, New York

Erie was launched on 29 February 1936. The Erie Club of New York planned and conducted the launching ceremony with a delegation of notables from Erie, attending, along with Erie's sponsor, Mrs. Edmund (Ida) Knoll.

With Erie only 98% complete, and her six-inch guns not yet installed, the commissioning ceremony was on 1 July 1936. Commander Hanson signed the formal receipt for the gunboat and read the orders that assigned him command of the ship.

The Yard managers reported on 1 August 1936, that the hull was 98.8% complete and the machinery spaces were 95.1% complete with an expected end of construction date set for 15 August. Erie left on 17 August, and sailed into the Atlantic for the first day at sea. During Erie's initial sea trials her propulsion system did suffer some malfunctions, but overall the trials were generally satisfactory. After a few repairs Erie ran her formal power trials on 26 August, and with further tests and trials performed at sea and in port, the vessel wase fitted out and prepared for a shakedown cruise to Europe. Erie's six-inch guns and their blast shields were mounted by the first week of October, and on 19 October, she departed for a cruise to the Norfolk Naval Operating Base.

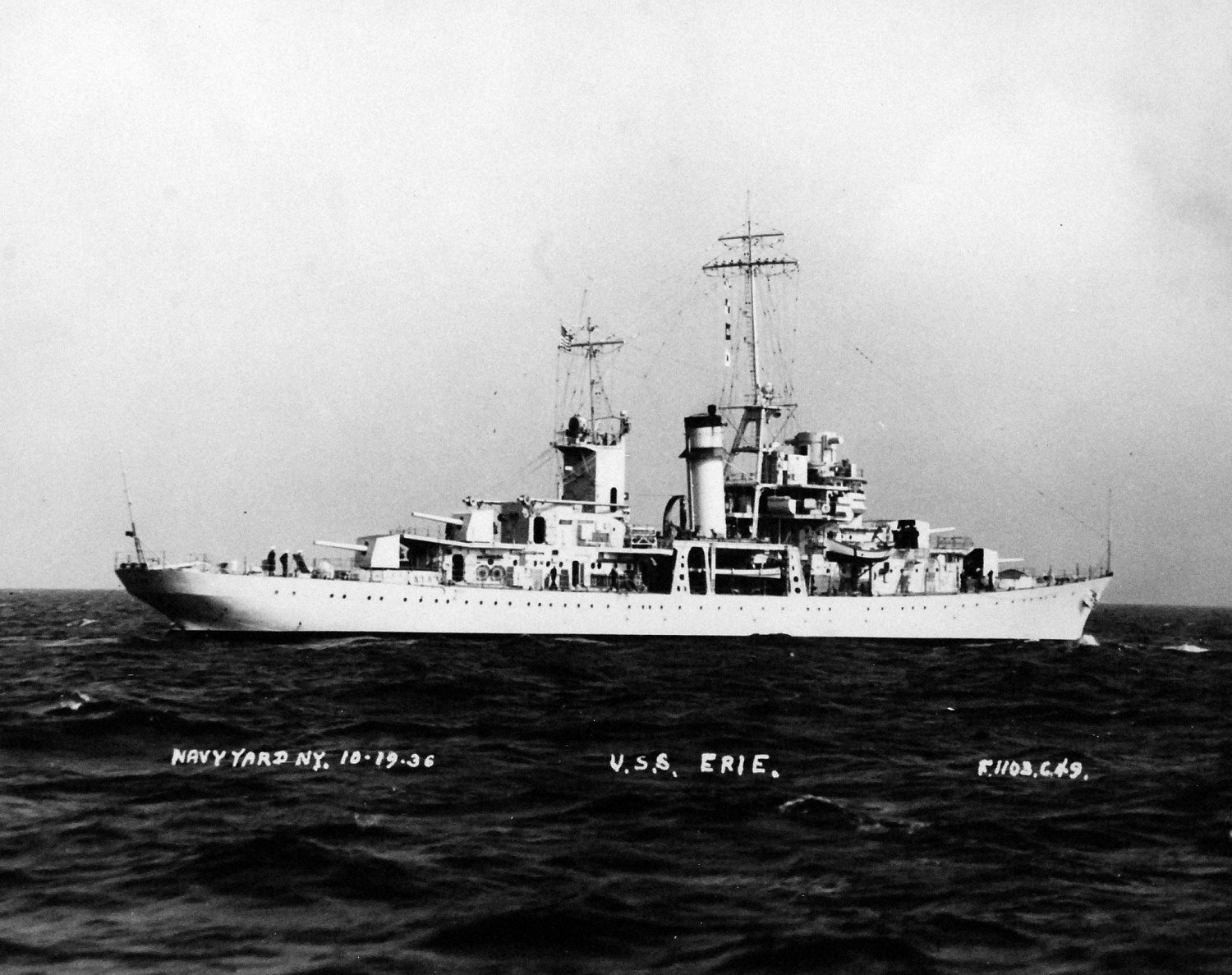
USS Erie (PG-50), off the New York Navy Yard, New York City, New York, 19 October 1936

Erie was directed to participate in two ceremonies in late October. The first was Navy Day festivities in New York Harbor, from 25 to 27 October. Erie, the heavy cruisers Indianapolis and New Orleans, and the destroyers Mahan and Flusser held open houses for the general public, while docked in the Yard. The second was on 28 October, for a fiftieth anniversary ceremony commemorating the dedication of the Statue of Liberty. Indianapolis and Erie greeted President Franklin D. Roosevelt with twenty-one gun salutes as he approached Bedloe's Island and as he departed. Erie then returned to the Yard to make final preparations for her departure on 31 October, for her shakedown cruise.

=== Design and armament ===
Erie was 308 feet (94 meters) long at the waterline with an overall length of 328 ft 6 in (100.13 m), her beam was 41 ft 3 in (12.57 m) and a mean draft of 14 ft 10 in (4.52 m). Her standard displacement was 2,000 long tons (2,032 t) and 2,830 long tons (2,875 t) at full load. Her crew during peacetime consisted of 213 officers and enlisted men.

Erie was powered by two Parsons geared single reduction steam turbines, each driving one screw, using steam generated by two Babcock & Wilcox boilers. The engines were designed to produce 6,200 ihp (4,600 kW) and reach a top speed of 20 kn (37 km/h; 23 mph). She was designed to provide a range of 8,000 nmi (15,000 km; 9,200 mi) at a speed of 12 kn (22 km/h; 14 mph).

Erie's main armament were four 6-inch (152 mm)/47 caliber guns, two mounted forward and two mounted aft. She had two 3-pounder (47 mm (1.9 in))/47 cal. saluting guns, and four 0.50 in (13 mm) Browning machine guns, though only temporary, while waiting for the 1.1 in (28 mm)/75 cal. guns to be produced. She was also armed with Mark 6 Depth charge racks (each holding 15 depth charges).

The ship lacked a full-length waterline armor belt, vital areas were protected by three and a half inches (89 mm) of armor. The conning tower was protected by four inches (100 mm) of armor, and the deck had one and a quarter inches (32 mm) of armor. The gunshields were only one inch (25 mm) thick.

Erie carried one floatplane aboard that was stored just aft of the smokestack on a raised deck. Initially this was a Curtiss SOC Seagull which was later replaced with a Vought OS2U Kingfisher. The planes required being hoisted into and out of the water by means of a derrick when used.

=== Accommodations ===
Erie-class gunboats were designed and built as flagships and a floating diplomatic embassy. Some of the additions to help with these missions were a large admiral's cabin located aft on the main deck behind the captain's cabin and two guests' cabins on the second deck. Eries also had large uncluttered fantails that could be covered with a canvas awning for hosting diplomatic envoys as could the aircraft deck. A large movie projector room was located in the aft superstructure and with a portable screen set up on the aft fantail and portable chairs set up on the afterdeck the crew or diplomats could watch movies. The ships boasted bands, made up of crew members, and they had Marine detachments for diplomatic duties.

== Service history ==
=== Inter-war period ===
==== Spanish Civil War and shakedown cruise ====
Sailing from New York on 31 October 1936, Erie spent November and December 1936, on a shakedown cruise and in temporary duty with Squadron 40-T, protecting US interests and citizens during the Spanish Civil War.

On 26 November, Erie's Commander reported for formal duty with Squadron 40-T. On 5 December, Erie received orders to call on a number of ports along Spain's northern coast to check on US citizens and other foreign nationals with orders to evacuate them, if need be. Erie had three United States consular officials sailing with her, including the consul and vice consul of the US Consulate in Bilbao, and Walter C. Thurston, counselor for the United States embassy in Madrid. These men were tasked with authorizing travel documents of US citizens or any other nationals that were requesting evacuation from Spain. With this they converted Erie into a floating consulate, one of the duties for which the ship had been built. Erie dropped anchor in Bilbao, Spain, on 13 December, joining Fearless (H67). While in Bilbao, Erie flew ensigns, illuminated at night, on both of her masts. Negotiations between British, Basque, and US government officials were also held while in port, that led to the release of $400,000 in certificated securities owned by a United States utility company. The 5,000 certificates, weighing 120 lb (54 kg), were conveyed to Erie for transport back to New York City.

==== España incident ====
Leaving Bilbao on 15 December, Erie set sail for Santander and Gijón, to check on US nationals living in these two towns. The ship arrived in Port El Musel, Gijón, around 08:00 on 17 December, and began to prepare a shore party for bringing back aboard any persons seeking evacuation. Around 08:30 a naval bombardment was launched by the rebel Spanish battleship España, her twelve-inch guns lofting three rounds into the harbor, with one landing within 300 yd (274 m) of Erie. General Quarters was called with preparations made to evade España's gun fire, but no return fire from Erie was ordered, and España almost immediately steamed away in the direction of the Bay of Biscay.

Newspapers back in the United States declared the incident as an attack on Erie, with some going as far as saying that seven rounds had been fired at her, with one landing as close as 100 yards (91 m). However, it appears, and Commander Hanson agreed, that the battleship's actions were merely part of an ongoing operation against loyalist forces that controlled Gijón. When Commander Hanson radioed his initial report to Washington he stated that Erie was not hit and that there was no basis to conclude that España's target was Erie. Because of his report the US State Department decided to deem the incident inadvertent and that no retaliation was required by the US Government.

Erie's executive officer, Lt. Commander Herman P. Knickerbocker, made the only detailed public statement, shortly after returning to the US. The statement was published in The New York Times on 3 January 1937:

At 8 AM we dropped anchor behind the breakwater at Port El Musel near Gijón in the Basque Republic, a Loyalist stronghold overlooking the Bay of Biscay. Our mission was to evacuate Americans and other accredited nationals.

Mist surrounded the horizon to the seaward and clung above the snow-capped Cantabrian Mountains inland. Boats were dipping alongside the lowered gangway as we prepared to send a party ashore. Twenty or thirty men stood by on deck.

The Officer of the Deck called attention to a rising plume of dirt on the hillside a mile away, thought it blasting in the quarry. We heard no sound. Some reported a second upheaval, but still we paid little attention.

Nearby, a second later, the crashing sound of a large shell landing was accompanied by the sight of harbor water and sand cascading on high. The distance away was equivalent to seven short city blocks. A trolley passing leisurely along the waterfront leaped forward, clanging madly, as the motorman drove to safety.

We supposed the town was under bombardment. It never occurred to us that we might be the target. Commander Hanson ordered all hands to stand by and to move out of range. Large United States ensigns flew at the flagstaff aft and on the foremost top, although it is doubtful if they could be recognized far away.

Identification of a battleship's silhouette six miles at sea indicated the intruder was the rebel warship España. At any event, before we changed position, she sailed off on a westerly course in a cloud of black smoke.

==== Evacuation of refugees and return to the US ====
Beginning on 18 December, Erie retraced its route across the northern coast of Spain to San Juan de Luz, landing eight Filipino, Puerto Rican, and Polish evacuees, along with the consular officials.

Erie was then dispatched from Squadron 40-T, with orders to immediately return to the United States. After sailing through heavy seas for the Azores, Erie reached Ponta Delgada, on 22 December, and set course the next day for the New York Navy Yards. Erie was severely battered by high seas and gale-force winds of the Atlantic on the return crossing, leaving several hull plates damaged. Erie arrived and moored up at the New York Navy Yard on the morning of 30 December, having completed the two-month shakedown cruise.

It was concluded that all the ship's systems and power plant had performed well during the shakedown, though cruising speed had been kept well below the maximum speed of 20 kn (37 km/h; 23 mph). The raked clipper bow had done well in keeping green water off the forward six-inch gun turret, even in the very rough sea conditions that had been encountered. In addition to damage to the hull plates, there were issues with Erie's radio direction finder which were dealt with in early 1937, as Erie prepared for standardization trials.

==== Training service at Annapolis ====
The ship was then assigned duties at the Naval Academy in Annapolis. Erie would be the lead vessel for the Coastal Cruising Detachment taking members of the Academy's second (junior) class on cruises to North Atlantic ports throughout the summer. From 7 May to 25 October 1937, Erie trained midshipmen, operating out of the Naval Academy, on afternoon training cruises during academic months then on an east coast cruise during June, July, and August.

On 11 May, while returning from a drill, Erie rammed the Santee dock while being berthed. The crash put a foot-deep indentation in her clipper bow that would necessitate repair before she could leave on a June cruise with the Coastal Cruising Detachment.

To celebrate the friendship visit of Commodore Matthew Perry to Japan in 1853, the Naval Academy hosted Japanese officials at a colorful re-enactment pageant on the Severn River and the Dewey Basin on 29 May. Erie, along with the destroyers Manley and Decatur, illuminated the festivities with their searchlights. They, and a number of sub chasers and small patrol boats, also paraded around the basin after a fireworks display that was viewed by 10,000 spectators.

==== Panama Canal service ====
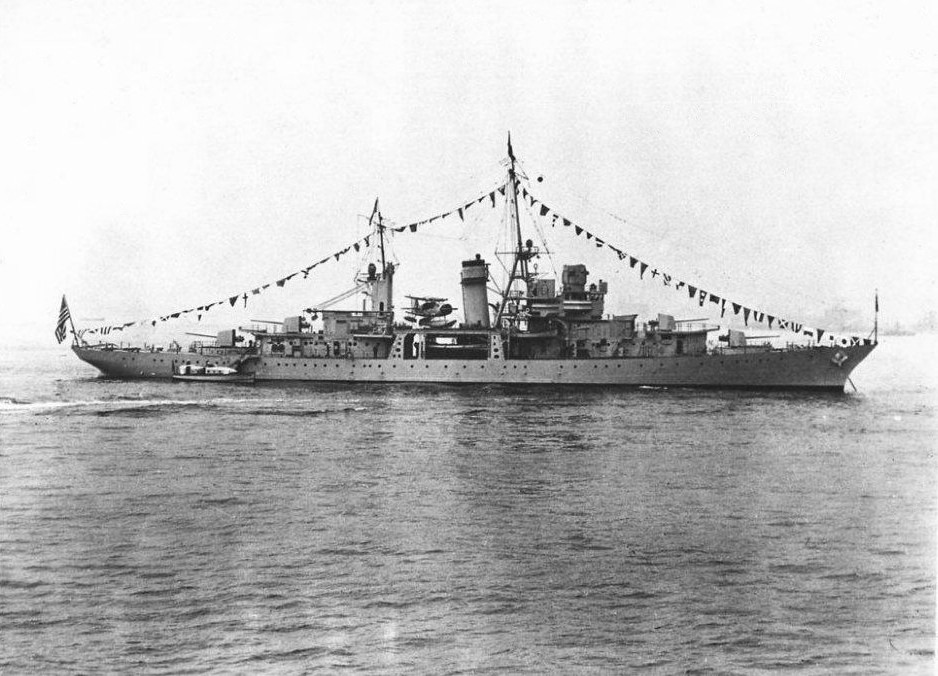
18 December 1938.

On 24 January 1938, with an overhaul finished, Erie got underway for the homeport of SPERON, Balboa in the Panama Canal Zone, with a first stop at the Naval Operating Base at Norfolk to turn in aviation equipment and spares, and to take ammunition aboard. The ship set sail for Guantanamo Bay, Cuba, on 26 January, and arrived at Cristóbal on 3 February 1938. Erie immediately transited the Panama Canal, for the first time, berthed at Balboa, the Canal's Pacific terminus, and reported for duty with SPERON. Balboa would be Erie's homeport until being transferred to the Offshore Patrol-Atlantic of the Panama Sea Frontier, and subsequently, to the Caribbean Sea Frontier Task Force in 1942.

On 21 February, the SOC-2 "Seagull" biplane scouts were removed from Erie and Charleston, and the aviation units decommissioned. Admiral William Leahy, Chief of Naval Operations, would state in his fiscal year 1938 report that the planes were removed because of technical difficulties in handling the aircraft. They were later replaced with monoplane OS2U "Kingfishers".

On 27 April, Erie's first commander, Commander Edward Hanson, departed for American Samoa to serve as the island's 28th Naval Governor, he took office on 26 June 1938. In July 1940, he would assume command of the Naval Station at Tutuila, American Samoa.

The only other major events for Erie would be spending the rest of April through 21 July, on a three-month goodwill tour of ten ports in eight Central and South American countries. Erie left Balboa on 17 April 1938, for Guayaquil, Ecuador, with Rear Admiral Williams and his flagstaff aboard. On 29 April, Erie's first "Crossing the Line" ceremony was held, which saw all of the ship's Navy and Marine "Pollywogs" initiated into the "Ancient Order of the Deep." Erie arrived in Guayaquil, on 30 April, for an eight-day stop, during which the ship hosted Ecuadorian officials and made shore visits that were both political and social in nature. Erie finished the year on a special mission to the Galapagos Islands, in December, to explore their suitability for enhancing the defense of the Panama Canal.

==== Cavalier incident ====
On 21 January 1939, Erie participated in search-and-rescue efforts related to the ditching and sinking of the Imperial Airways Short Empire flying boat Cavalier in the Atlantic Ocean. Erie transferred a doctor to the commercial tanker Esso Baytown, which rescued the airliner's 10 survivors, but because of the high seas and darkness had to discontinue the search for the other three people who had been aboard Cavalier.

=== World War II ===
==== Battle of the Caribbean ====
At the outbreak of World War II Erie was stationed Balboa, Panama, at the Pacific end of the Panama Canal. On 13 December 1941, Erie picked up 50 Japanese internees at Puntarenas, from the Costa Rican government. On 14 December, Erie boarded MV Sea Boy and removed a Japanese national on board, and ordered Sea Boy into Balboa the next day. On 16 December, Erie crewmen boarded MV Santa Margarita and ordered it to Puntarenas, and later the same day, towed a disabled motor boat, Orion, into the same port.

In June 1942, Erie was transferred to Cristóbal, at the Atlantic end of the Canal, and joined the Battle of the Caribbean against German U-boats operating between Panama and Cuba.

On 12 June 1942, Erie rescued the master and 45 other survivors of the British steamship Fort Good Hope at location 10°12′0″N 80°14′30″W after having been sunk by U-159 at location 10°19′0″N 80°16′0″W. After salvaging the lifeboat, Erie joined with a patrol plane in prosecuting a submarine contact, ultimately dropping six depth charges with no result. Erie then went on to transfer Fort Good Hope's survivors and their lifeboats to submarine chaser PC-209.

On 15 June 1942, Erie rescued the master and 22 survivors of the U.S. bulk carrier Lebore, off St. Andrews Island, after it had been sunk by U-172 the day before. After embarking the merchant sailors at 12°35′N 81°42′W Erie sank their lifeboat with gunfire to prevent a menace to navigation. The next day, along with the destroyer Tattnall, Erie rescued 8 Armed Guards from Lebore along with 49 survivors from the Dutch steamship Crijnssen which Lebore had rescued on 11 June, after their ship had been sunk by U-504 at 18°14′0″N 85°11′0″W.

==== Sinking of Erie ====
On Tuesday, 10 November 1942, Erie left Port-of-Spain, Trinidad, leading convoy TAG-20 en route to Guantanamo Bay. Erie was accompanied by the destroyer Biddle, corvette Spry, and three PC-461-class submarine chasers PC-545, PC-573, and PC-573.

Two days out they approached Curaçao. At 11:30 Van Kinsbergen (1939), PC-583, PC-589, SC-533, and a PT boat had left from Willemstad, to patrol the area while Queen Wilhelmina left with additional ships that were to join the convoy.

At 16:35 the subsidiary convoy met up with the main convoy. At 17:03 Erie was struck by one of three torpedoes fired by U-163. The captain had taken the conn at 5:02 pm and ordered "right standard rudder" to investigate spray on the starboard beam. It was then that a torpedo was sighted 2,000 yd (1,800 m) out. "Left full rudder" was ordered but two more torpedoes were sighted abaft the starboard beam, the siren was sounded and as Erie swung left, the ship was struck in the starboard quarter. Erie had been struck in one of its oil bunkers, and immediately started burning with all engines stopping and loss of electrical power. By 17:40 Erie was listing to starboard and down by the stern with partial power restored and the starboard engine in use. At 17:44 the starboard engine was stopped and the #2 boiler cut in. At 17:45 two severe explosions in the #4 gun shelter rocked Erie, followed within five minutes by two more explosions in the #4 gun shelter. At 17:55, "all stop" was ordered and three motor whaleboats were lowered to search for casualties with an additional boat lowered at 18:00 with injured personnel. The ship began moving forward again on the port engine heading for the beach. The crew began heaving the powder from the #3 ready room overboard at 18:12 to prevent it from exploding too. "All engines stop" was called six minutes later, with the main deck under water by 18:20. At 18:23 Erie hit bottom, and "back full" was called as Erie beached itself 100 yd (91 m) off shore. With oil on the water around the ship on fire, the captain called for "all hands abandon ship" at 18:26. The explosion and fire had killed seven of the crew, including officers Lt. Ned James Wentz, Lt. George Kunkle and wounded 11 more. Erie was beached to prevent sinking, and burned for days.

Biddle, Spry, and SC-533 searched the area around Erie. SC-533 "dropped destructive barrage" ahead of Erie as the ship headed east toward the beach. The PT boat also dropped depth charges and was seen to be fired upon by a merchantman. Three airplanes joined the search. PC-545 reported seeing a submarine and opened fire. PC-624, Van Kinsbergen and Queen Wilhelmina circled around to join the hunt about six miles (9.7 km) but were unable to get a fix on the contact. Spry followed Erie toward Curaçao, with Biddle attempting to come along Erie to help with firefighting, but because of the explosions was unable to get close enough.

It was later believed that the U-boat had escaped by going under the convoy to disguise its sound, and was able to flee the area.

== Fate ==
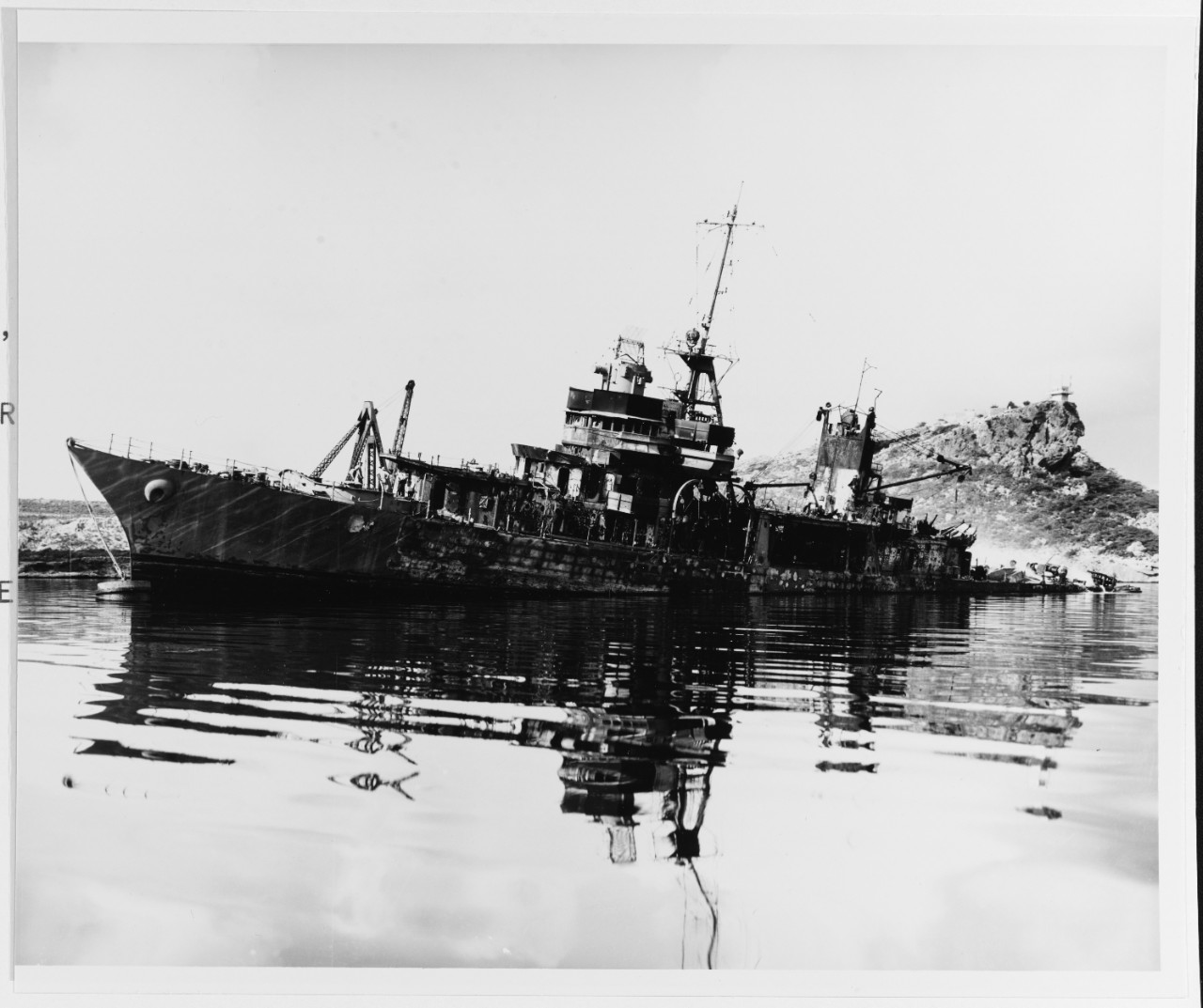
USS Erie (PG-50), salvage 2 December 1942

A couple of weeks later, on 28 November, Erie was raised and towed to the inner harbor of Willemstad. On 5 December, during further preparations for salvage, Erie capsized at her moorings. The ship was left in place until 1952, when she was partially raised, towed out to sea, and sunk in deep water.

== Awards and decorations ==

| American Defense Service Medal with fleet clasp | American Campaign Medal with one battle star | World War II Victory Medal |

== Bibliography ==
- Lenton, H. T. (1974). American Gunboats and Minesweepers. Arco Publishing Company. pp. 3–4. ISBN 0-668-03508-0.
- "Erie (PG-50)". NavSource.
- "U.S.S. ERIE: SHIP SPECIFICATIONS". U.S.S. ERIE (PG-50). USS Erie.org.
- "SHIP HISTORY". U.S.S. ERIE (PG-50). USS Erie.org.
- "Erie (PG-50) ii". Dictionary of American Naval fighting ships. Naval History and Heritage Command.
- Baker, A. D. III (November 1997). "Historic Fleets" (PDF). Combat Fleets of the World. U.S. Naval Institute. p. 55.
- Bloom, Jim (December 2007). "Armed and Alone: America's Century-Long Love Romance With Gunboats" (PDF). Sea Classics. Challenge Publications. pp. 57–62.
- "Air Liner Sunk in Atlantic – Three Lives Lost". News. The Times. No. 48210. London. 23 January 1939. col. C, p. 12.
- Cressman, Robert (2000). "Chapter III: 1941". The official chronology of the U.S. Navy in World War II. Annapolis, Maryland: Naval Institute Press. ISBN 978-1-55750-149-3.
- "Loss of USS Erie – November 12, 1942" (PDF). US Navy. 17 November 1942.
