= Vought O5U =

O5U
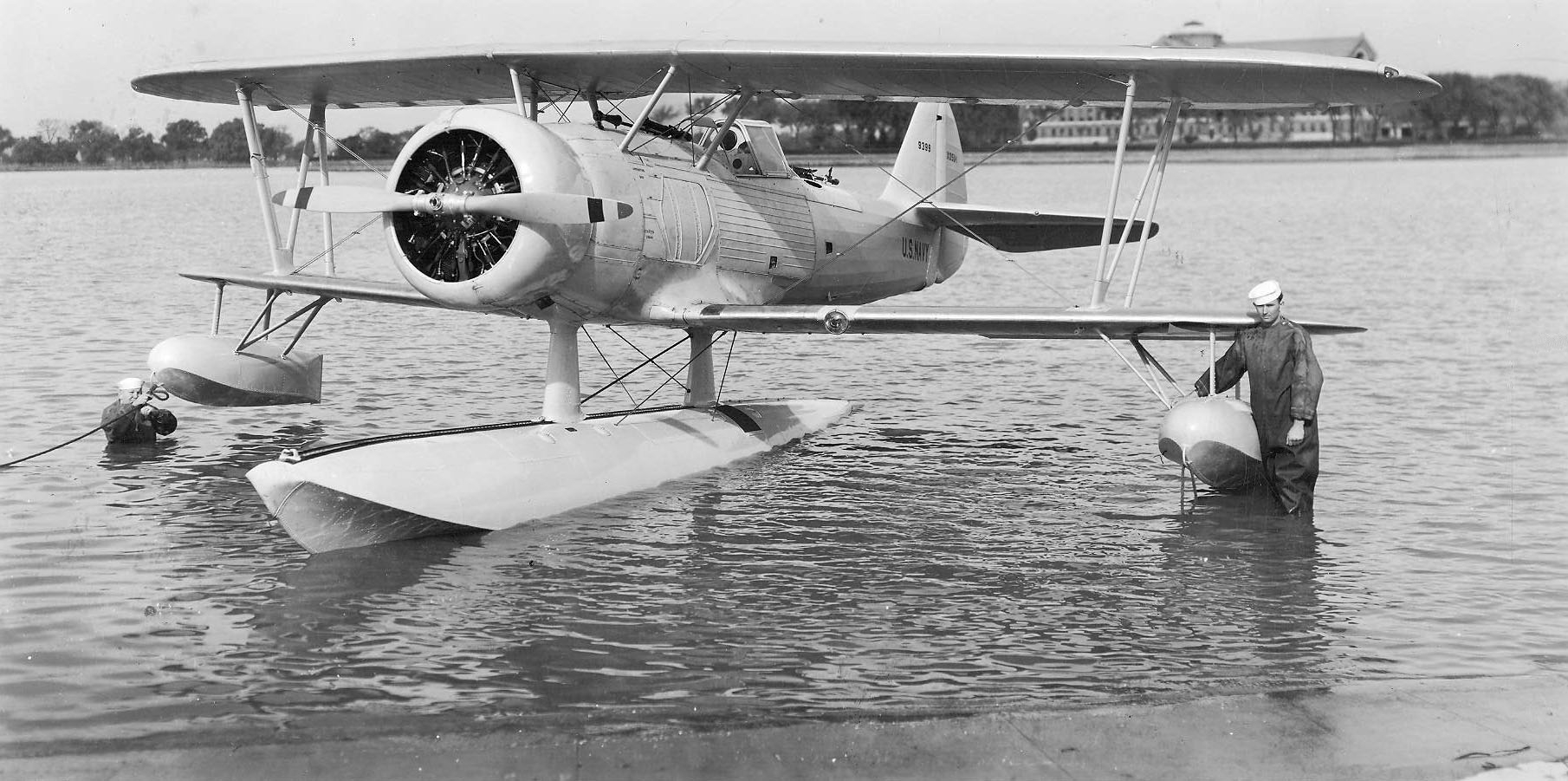

General information
- Type: Observation floatplane
- National origin: United States
- Manufacturer: Vought
- Number built: 1

History
- First flight: 8 May 1934

The Vought O5U was a 1930s prototype American observation floatplane to meet a United States Navy requirement for a catapult launched scouting aircraft. The contract was won by Curtiss who went on to produce the SOC Seagull; only one O5U was built.

== Development ==
The United States Navy contracted three companies to produce prototypes to meet a requirement for a catapult launched biplane, with a central float and folding wings. Douglas produced the XO2D-1, Curtiss the XO3C-1 and Vought the XO5U-1.

The XO5U-1 (serial number 9399) was powered by a single Pratt & Whitney R-1340-12 piston engine and first flew on the 8 May 1934.

The contract was awarded to Curtiss and only one XO5U-1 was built. The Status of Naval Aircraft, dated June 1937, listed the XO5U-1 as assigned at Mustin Field at the Naval Aircraft Factory, Philadelphia, Pennsylvania. It crashed in May 1938.

== Specifications (XO5U-1) ==
Data from

General characteristics

- Crew: 2 (pilot, observer/gunner)
- Length: 32.5 ft 6 in (10.06 m)
- Wingspan: 36 ft (11 m)
- Powerplant: 1 × Pratt & Whitney R-1340-12 9-cyl. air-cooled radial piston engine, 550 hp (410 kW)

Performance

- Maximum speed: 155 mph (249 km/h, 135 kn)
- Service ceiling: 15,100 ft (4,600 m)

Armament

- Guns:
  - 1 × .30 cal (7.62 mm) fixed forward firing machine gun
  - 1 × .30 cal (7.62 mm) flexible machine gun in rear cockpit

== See also ==
Aircraft of comparable role, configuration, and era

- Douglas O2D
- Curtiss SOC Seagull
- Fairey Seafox
- Fokker C.XI
- Heinkel He 114
- Nakajima E8N
- Potez 452

Related lists

- List of flying boats and floatplanes
