= PGM-1-class motor gunboat =

Type of warship

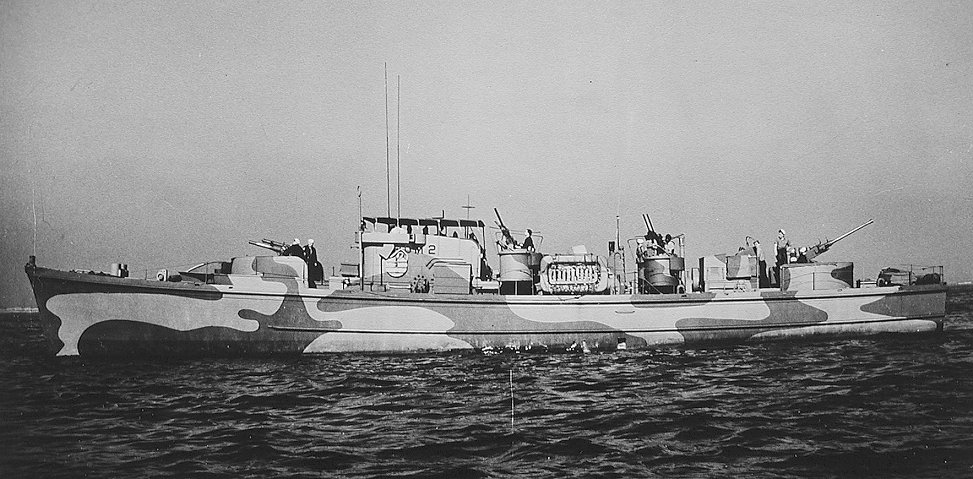
- PGM-2 after her conversion

Class overview
- Operators: United States Navy
- Preceded by: Erie class
- Succeeded by: PGM-9 class
- Built: 1942-1943
- Planned: 8
- Completed: 8
- Lost: 1

General characteristics
- Type: Patrol gunboat, motor (PGM)
- Displacement: 95 tons
- Length: 110 ft 10 in (33.8 m)
- Beam: 23 ft (7.0 m)
- Draft: 10 ft 10 in (3.30 m)
- Propulsion: 2 × 1,540 bhp (1,150 kW) Electro-Motive Corp. 16-184A diesel engines; 2 × shafts
- Speed: 21 knots (39 km/h; 24 mph)
- Armament: Typically: 1 × 3 in (76 mm)/23 dual-purpose gun; 1 × 40 mm gun; 4 × twin .50 cal (12.7 mm) machine guns; 1 × 60 mm mortar

The PGM-1-class motor gunboats were a class of eight gunboats converted for the United States Navy from 1943 to 1944 and were succeeded by the PGM-9-class motor gunboats. All eight PGM-1s were converted from SC-497-class submarine chasers. The PGM-1s were created to support PT boats in the Pacific, but were too slow to keep up. The PGM-1s were discontinued and the PGM-9s, also too slow, were shifted to support minesweeping ships instead.

PGM-7 was the only PGM-1-class vessel lost in World War II. The others were sent to the Foreign Liquidation Commission in 1947. Their exact fate is unknown.

== Sources ==
- INFORMATION ON WWII SCs
