= Douglas O2D =

O2D
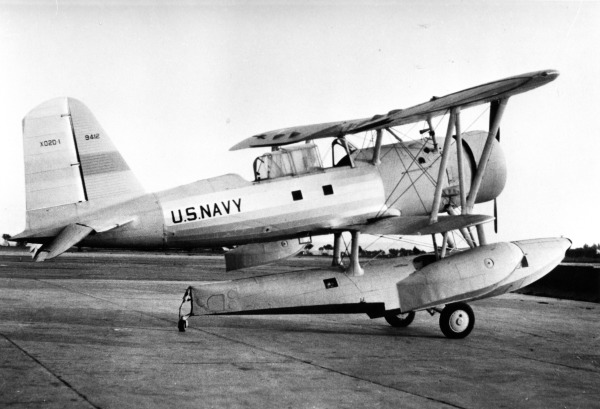

General information
- Type: Observation floatplane
- National origin: United States of America
- Manufacturer: Douglas Aircraft Company
- Status: Prototype
- Number built: 1

History
- First flight: March 1934

The Douglas XO2D-1 was a prototype American observation floatplane of the 1930s. It was a single engined biplane intended to be launched by aircraft catapult from ships of the United States Navy, but only one was built, the production contract going to Curtiss for the SOC Seagull.

== Development and design ==
In 1933, the United States Navy had a requirement to replace its Vought O3U Corsair as the standard aircraft catapult launched observation aircraft aboard US Navy ships, and in June of that year it placed an order for a single example of a design from Douglas Aircraft Company, the XO2D-1, together with aircraft from Curtiss (the XO3C-1) and Vought (the XO5U-1). Douglas's design was a single engined biplane with single-bay wings of sesquiplane configuration that folded for shipboard storage. It was of all-metal construction, and housed the crew of two in tandem under an enclosed canopy. It was powered by a Pratt & Whitney Wasp radial engine, and to allow easy operation from land, was fitted with a tailwheel undercarriage whose twin mainwheels retracted into the single main float.

It was first flown in March 1934, being tested at Anacostia and Naval Air Station Norfolk. It was rejected in favour of the Curtiss design, which was ordered into production as the SOC Seagull in March 1935. After further testing it was withdrawn from use on 13 September 1935.

== Specifications (XO2D-1) ==
Data from McDonnell Douglas Aircraft since 1920

General characteristics

- Crew: 2
- Length: 32 ft 0 in (9.75 m)
- Wingspan: 36 ft 0 in (10.97 m)
- Height: 16 ft 4 1/2 in (4.991 m) (wheels down)
- Wing area: 302.8 sq ft (28.13 m^{2})
- Empty weight: 3,460 lb (1,569 kg)
- Gross weight: 5,109 lb (2,317 kg)
- Powerplant: 1 × Pratt & Whitney R-1340-12 9-cylinder air-cooled radial engine, 550 hp (410 kW)

Performance

- Maximum speed: 141 kn (162 mph, 261 km/h)
- Range: 693 nmi (798 mi, 1,284 km)
- Service ceiling: 14,300 ft (4,400 m)
- Time to altitude: 6 min to 5,000 ft (1,520 m)

Armament

- Guns: 1× forward firing and 1× flexibly mounted .30 in (7.62 mm) Browning machine guns
- Bombs: 2× 100 lb (45 kg) bombs

== See also ==
Aircraft of comparable role, configuration, and era

- Curtiss SOC Seagull
- Fairey Seafox
- Fokker C.XI
- Heinkel He 114
- Nakajima E8N
- Potez 452
- Vought O5U

Related lists

- List of flying boats and floatplanes
