= German submarine U-163 (1941) =

German World War II submarine

Coordinates: 45°05′N 15°00′W

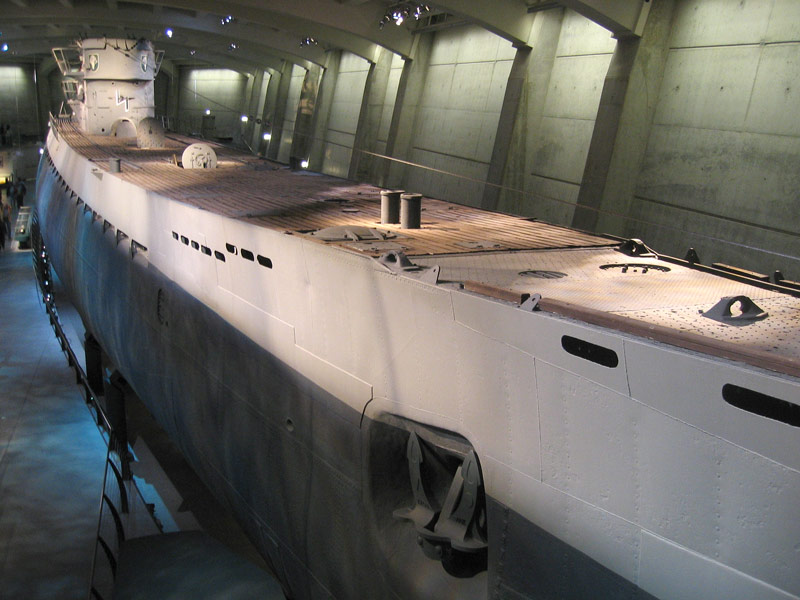
- U-505, a typical Type IXC boat

History

Nazi Germany
- Name: U-163
- Ordered: 25 September 1939
- Builder: DeSchiMAG, Bremen
- Yard number: 702
- Laid down: 8 May 1940
- Launched: 1 May 1941
- Commissioned: 21 October 1941
- Fate: Sunk on 12 / 13 March 1943

General characteristics
- Class & type: Type IXC submarine
- Displacement: 1,120 t (1,100 long tons) surfaced; 1,232 t (1,213 long tons) submerged
- Length: 76.76 m (251 ft 10 in) o/a; 58.75 m (192 ft 9 in) pressure hull
- Beam: 6.76 m (22 ft 2 in) o/a; 4.40 m (14 ft 5 in) pressure hull
- Height: 9.60 m (31 ft 6 in)
- Draught: 4.70 m (15 ft 5 in)
- Installed power: 4,400 PS (3,200 kW; 4,300 bhp) (diesels); 1,000 PS (740 kW; 990 shp) (electric)
- Propulsion: 2 shafts; 2 × diesel engines; 2 × electric motors
- Speed: 18.3 knots (33.9 km/h; 21.1 mph) surfaced; 7.3 knots (13.5 km/h; 8.4 mph) submerged
- Range: 13,450 nmi (24,910 km; 15,480 mi) at 10 knots (19 km/h; 12 mph) surfaced; 64 nmi (119 km; 74 mi) at 4 knots (7.4 km/h; 4.6 mph) submerged
- Test depth: 230 m (750 ft)
- Complement: 4 officers, 44 enlisted
- Armament: 6 × torpedo tubes (4 bow, 2 stern); 22 × 53.3 cm (21 in) torpedoes; 1 × 10.5 cm (4.1 in) SK C/32 deck gun (180 rounds); 1 × 3.7 cm (1.5 in) SK C/30 AA gun; 1 × twin 2 cm FlaK 30 AA guns

Service record
- Part of: 4th U-boat Flotilla; 21 October 1941 – 31 July 1942; 10th U-boat Flotilla; 1 August 1942 – 13 March 1943
- Identification codes: M 28 716
- Commanders: K.Kapt. Kurt-Eduard Englemann; 21 October 1941 – 13 March 1943
- Operations: 3 patrols: 1st patrol: 21 July – 16 September 1942; 2nd patrol: 17 October 1942 – 6 January 1943; 3rd patrol: 10 – 13 March 1943
- Victories: 3 merchant ships sunk (15,011 GRT); 1 warship total loss (2,000 tons)

German submarine U-163 was a Type IXC U-boat of Nazi Germany's Kriegsmarine built for service during World War II. The keel for this boat was laid down on 8 May 1940 at the DeSchiMAG, Bremen yard as yard number 702. She was launched on 1 May 1941 and commissioned on 21 October under the command of Korvettenkapitän Kurt-Eduard Engelmann.

The U-boat's service began with training as part of the 4th U-boat Flotilla. She then moved to the 10th flotilla on 1 August 1942 for operations. She sank three ships, totalling 15,011 GRT and one warship was declared a total loss (2,000 tons).

She was sunk by a Canadian corvette in March 1943.

== Design ==
German Type IXC submarines were slightly larger than the original Type IXBs. U-163 had a displacement of 1,120 tonnes (1,100 long tons) when at the surface and 1,232 tonnes (1,213 long tons) while submerged. The U-boat had a total length of 76.76 m (251 ft 10 in), a pressure hull length of 58.75 m (192 ft 9 in), a beam of 6.76 m (22 ft 2 in), a height of 9.60 m (31 ft 6 in), and a draught of 4.70 m (15 ft 5 in). The submarine was powered by two MAN M 9 V 40/46 supercharged four-stroke, nine-cylinder diesel engines producing a total of 4,400 metric horsepower (3,240 kW; 4,340 shp) for use while surfaced, two Siemens-Schuckert 2 GU 345/34 double-acting electric motors producing a total of 1,000 metric horsepower (740 kW; 990 shp) for use while submerged. She had two shafts and two 1.92 m (6 ft) propellers. The boat was capable of operating at depths of up to 230 metres (750 ft).

The submarine had a maximum surface speed of 18.3 knots (33.9 km/h; 21.1 mph) and a maximum submerged speed of 7.3 knots (13.5 km/h; 8.4 mph). When submerged, the boat could operate for 63 nautical miles (117 km; 72 mi) at 4 knots (7.4 km/h; 4.6 mph); when surfaced, she could travel 13,450 nautical miles (24,910 km; 15,480 mi) at 10 knots (19 km/h; 12 mph). U-163 was fitted with six 53.3 cm (21 in) torpedo tubes (four fitted at the bow and two at the stern), 22 torpedoes, one 10.5 cm (4.13 in) SK C/32 naval gun, 180 rounds, and a 3.7 cm (1.5 in) SK C/30 as well as a 2 cm (0.79 in) C/30 anti-aircraft gun. The boat had a complement of forty-eight.

== Service history ==
=== First patrol ===
The submarine's first patrol took her from Kiel on 21 July 1942, across the North Sea and through the 'gap' between Iceland and the Faroe Islands. She arrived at Lorient, in occupied France, on 16 January. She would be based at this Atlantic port for the rest of her career. She had crossed the Atlantic Ocean and sailed to the southern Cuban coast.

=== Second patrol ===
Her second foray took her to the area north of South America. Here she sank La Cordillera on 5 November 1942 85 nmi (157 km; 98 mi) east of Barbados. She also damaged an American gunboat, USS Erie on 12 November and sank Empire Starling northeast of Barbados on the 21st. Her final victim on this patrol was Apóide which went down a day later. She returned to Lorient on 6 January 1943.

=== Third patrol and Loss ===
The U-boat departed Lorient for the last time on 10 March 1943. On 13 March 1943, she was sunk by depth charges from HMCS Prescott northwest of Cape Finisterre, Spain. 57 men (all hands) died.

== Summary of raiding history ==
Date	Name	Nationality	Tonnage (Note: Merchant ship tonnages are in gross register tons. Military vessels are listed by tons displacement.)	Fate
5 November 1942	La Cordillera	United Kingdom	5,185	Sunk
12 November 1942	USS Erie (PG-50)	United States Navy	2,000	Total loss
21 November 1942	Empire Starling	United Kingdom	6,060	Sunk
22 November 1942	Apalóide	Brazil	3,766	Sunk

== Bibliography ==
- Busch, Rainer; Röll, Hans-Joachim (1999). German U-boat commanders of World War II : a biographical dictionary. Translated by Brooks, Geoffrey. London, Annapolis, Md: Greenhill Books, Naval Institute Press. ISBN 1-55750-186-6.
- Busch, Rainer; Röll, Hans-Joachim (1999). Deutsche U-Boot-Verluste von September 1939 bis Mai 1945 [German U-boat losses from September 1939 to May 1945]. Der U-Boot-Krieg (in German). Vol. IV. Hamburg, Berlin, Bonn: Mittler. ISBN 3-8132-0514-2.
- Gröner, Erich; Jung, Dieter; Maass, Martin (1991). U-boats and Mine Warfare Vessels. German Warships 1815–1945. Vol. 2. Translated by Thomas, Keith; Magowan, Rachel. London: Conway Maritime Press. ISBN 0-85177-593-4.
- Kemp, Paul (1999). U-Boats Destroyed – German Submarine Losses in the World Wars. London: Arms & Armour. ISBN 1-85409-515-3.
