= Curtiss SOC Seagull =

American scout seaplane

SOC Seagull
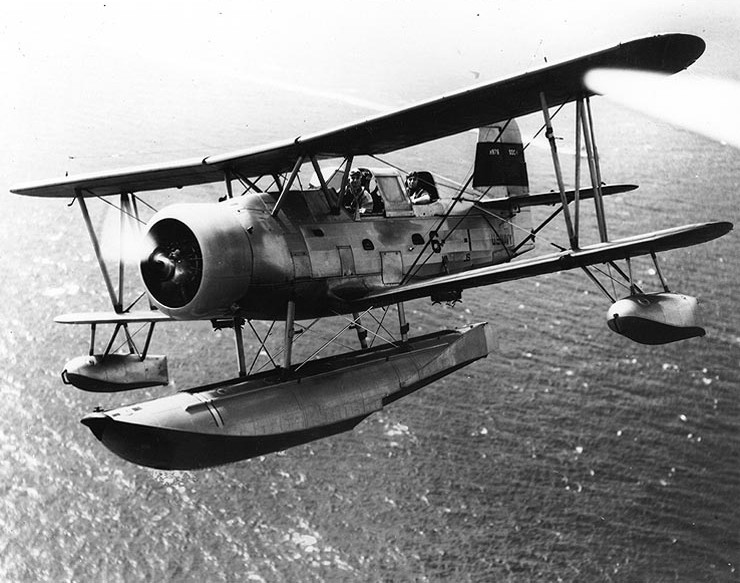
- Seagull seaplane configuration in flight

General information
- Type: Scout
- National origin: United States
- Manufacturer: Curtiss-Wright
- Designer: Alexander Solla
- Primary users: United States Navy United States Coast Guard; United States Marine Corps
- Number built: 322 (258 by Curtiss, 64 by the NAF)

History
- Manufactured: 1935-1940
- Introduction date: 12 November 1935
- First flight: April 1934
- Retired: 1949

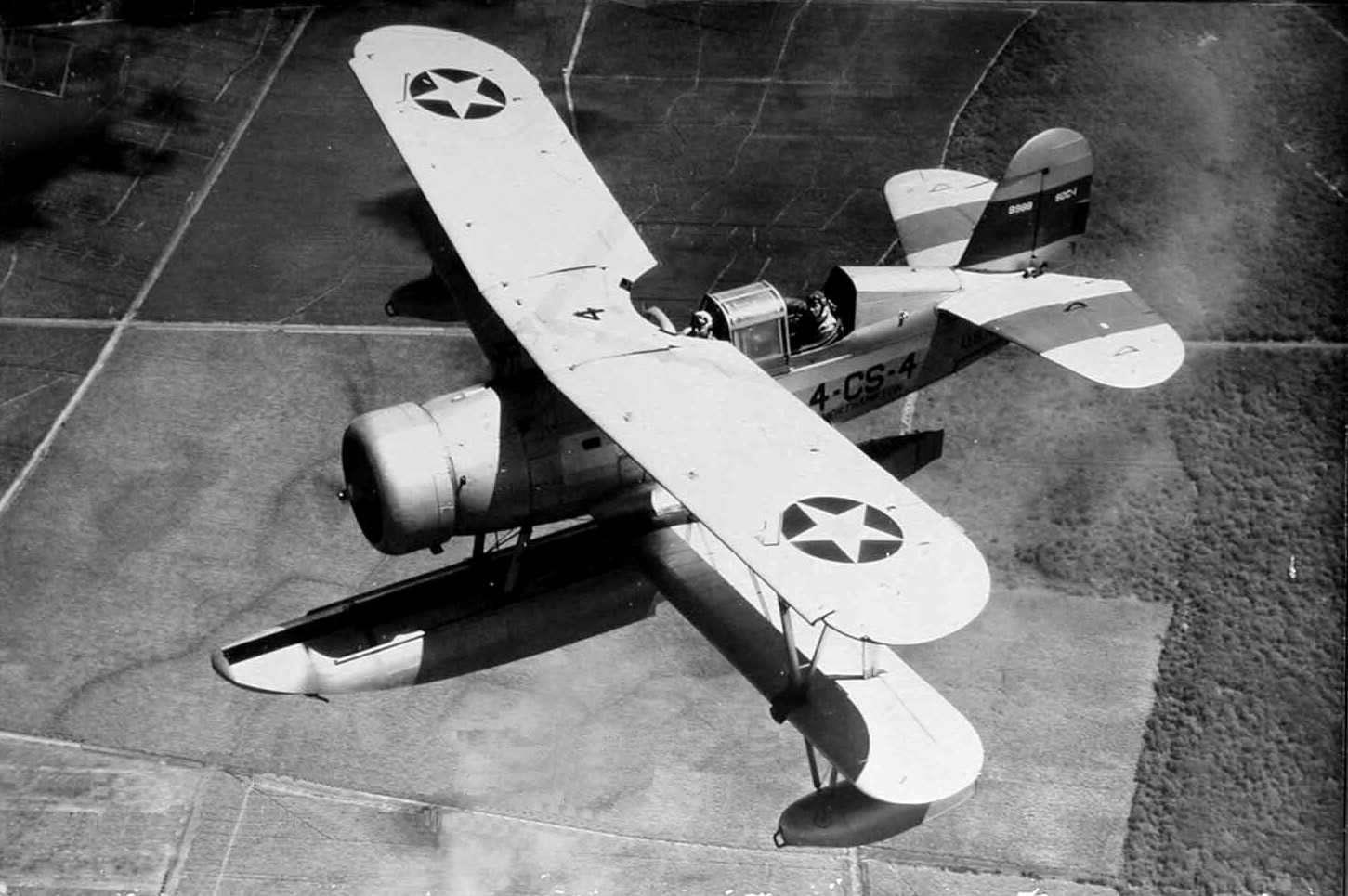
SOC-1 Seagull in 1940

The Curtiss SOC Seagull was an American single-engined scout observation seaplane, designed by Alexander Solla of the Curtiss-Wright Corporation for the United States Navy. The aircraft served on battleships and cruisers in a seaplane configuration, being launched by catapult and recovered from a sea landing. The wings folded back against the fuselage for storage aboard ship. When based ashore or on carriers the single float was replaced by fixed wheeled landing gear.

Curtiss delivered 258 SOC aircraft, in versions SOC-1 through SOC-4, beginning in 1935. The SOC-3 design was the basis of the Naval Aircraft Factory SON-1 variant, of which the NAF delivered 64 aircraft from 1940.

The aircraft served as an important observation craft during WW2 for the U.S. Navy, although the Vought OS2U Kingfisher served in greater numbers.

== Design and development ==
The SOC was ordered for production by the United States Navy in 1933 and first entered service in 1935. The first order was for 135 SOC-1 models, which was followed by 40 SOC-2 models for landing operations and 83 SOC-3s. A variant of the SOC-3 was built by the Naval Aircraft Factory and was known as the SON-1.

== Operational history ==
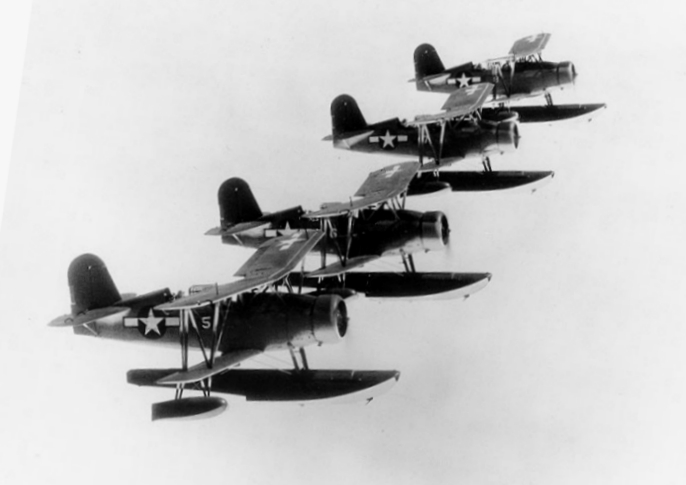
USS Portland's SOC-3 Seagulls in formation

The first ship the SOC was assigned to was the light cruiser USS Marblehead in November 1935; by the end of the decade, the SOC had replaced its predecessor throughout the fleet. Production came to an end in 1938. By 1941, most battleships had transitioned to the Vought OS2U Kingfisher and cruisers were expected to replace their aging SOCs with the third generation SO3C Seamew. The SO3C, however, suffered from a weak engine and plans to adopt it as a replacement were scrapped. The SOC, despite belonging to an earlier generation, went on to execute its missions of gunfire observation and limited range scouting missions.

Through the first six months of naval service, the SOC was known as the XO3C-1, The designation was changed to SOC when it was decided to merge its scouting and observation roles. The SOC was not called the Seagull until 1941, when the U.S. Navy began the wholesale adoption of popular names for aircraft in addition to their alpha-numeric designations. The name 'Seagull' had earlier been given to two civil Curtiss aircraft, a Curtiss Model 18 and a Model 25, both converted Curtiss MF flying boats.

When operating as a seaplane, returning SOCs would land on the relatively smooth ocean surface created on the sheltered side of the vessel as it made a wide turn, after which the aircraft would be winched back onto the deck.

When the SOC was replaced by the OS2U Kingfisher, most remaining airframes were converted into trainers; they remained in use until 1945. With the failure of the Curtiss SO3C Seamew, many SOCs in second line service were returned to frontline units starting in late 1943. They saw service aboard warships in the combat zone for the rest of World War II. This is one of the few instances in aviation history in which an older aircraft type, that was retired or sent to second line service, replaced the new aircraft type that was intended to replace it.

In certain roles such as an observation aircraft for battleships, they served until 1949, and were eventually superseded by longer range radar and helicopters.

== Variants ==
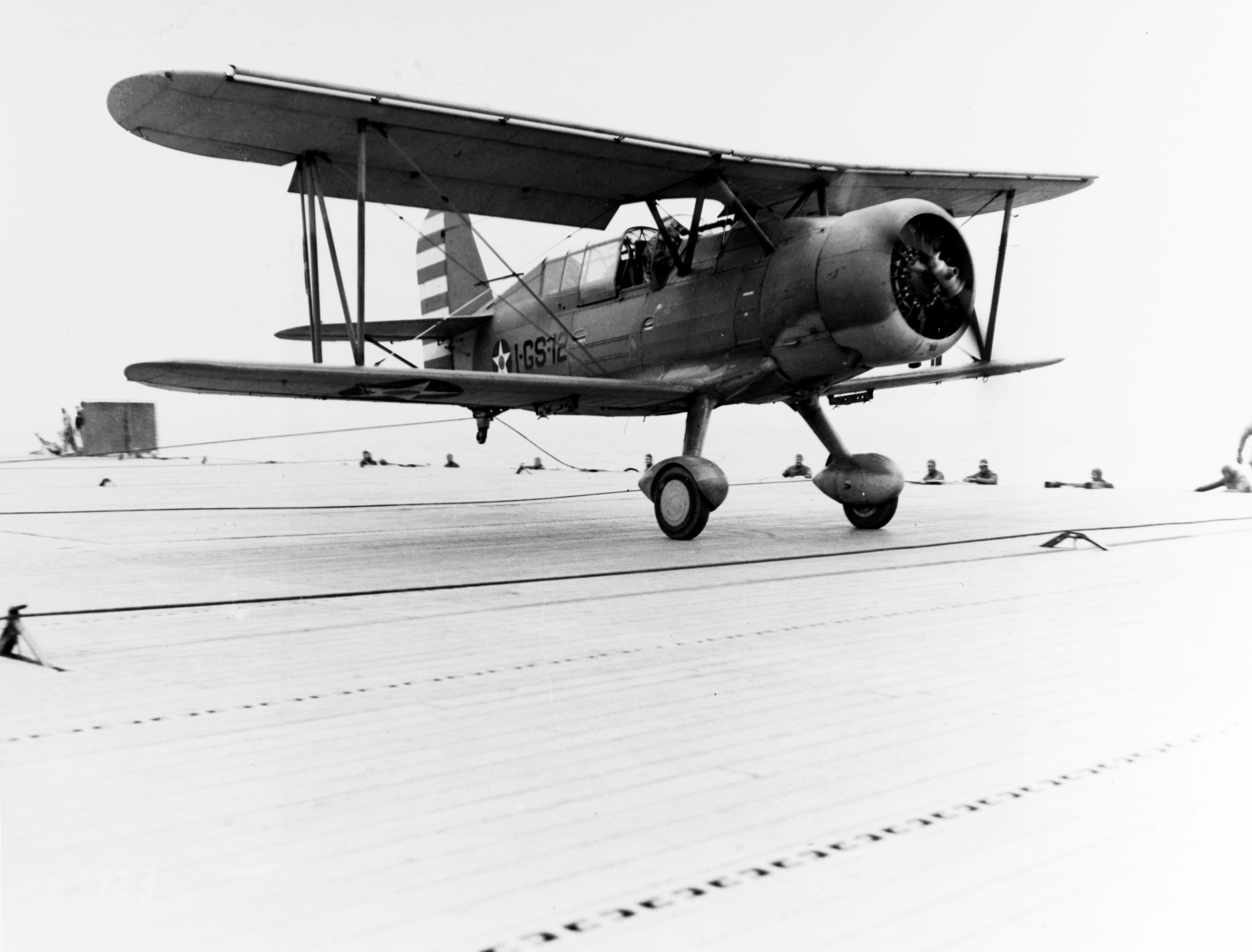
Wheel equipped SOC-3A Seagull touches down on USS Long Island in April 1942, celebrating the carrier's 2,000th landing.

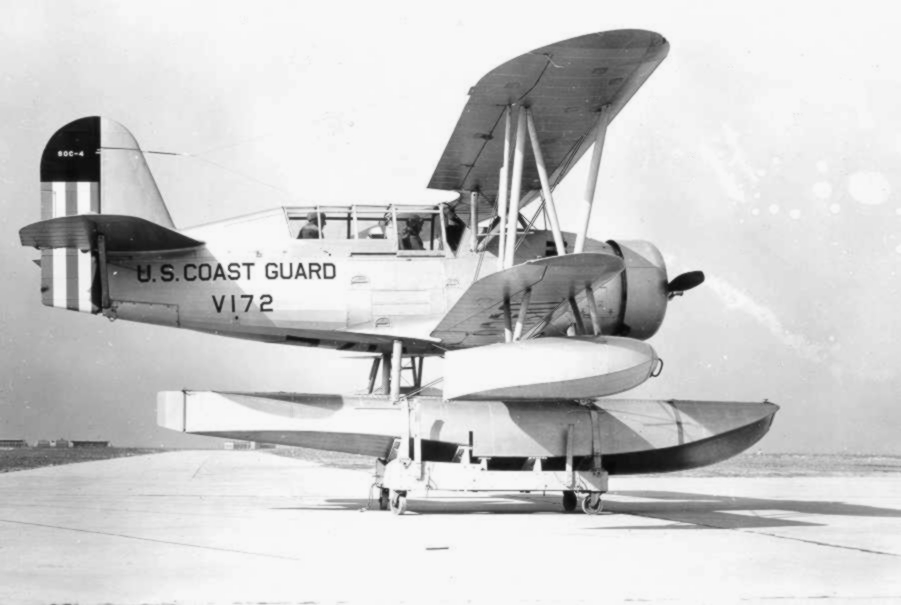
A SOC-4 of the U.S. Coast Guard.

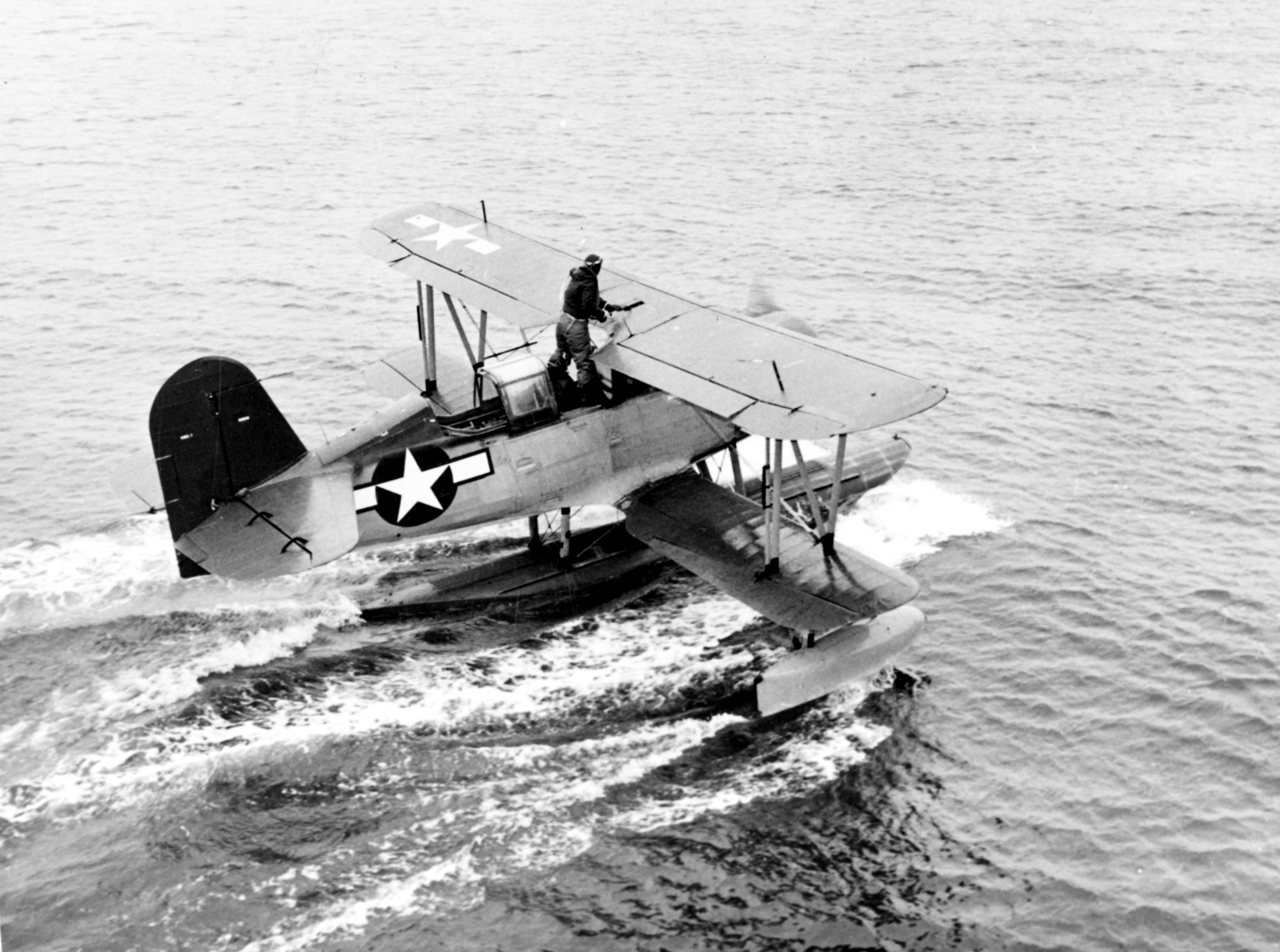
SOC-1 in 1947

XO3C-1 (Curtiss Model 71)
Prototype aircraft, powered by 550 hp (410 kW) Pratt & Whitney R-1340-12 engine. One built, redesignated XSOC-1 on 23 March 1935.
SOC-1 (Curtiss Model 71A)
Initial production version, with 550 hp (410 kW) Pratt & Whitney R-1340-18 engine enclosed in NACA cowling. Interchangeable float and wheeled undercarriage. 135 built.
SOC-2 (Curtiss Model 71B)
Minor changes, with R-1340-22 engine. 40 built. Wheeled undercarriage only.
XSO2C-1 (Curtiss Model 71C)
Improved version. One prototype only, no production.
SOC-3 (Curtiss Model 71E)
Similar to SOC-2, but with interchangeable undercarriage. 83 built by Curtiss as SOC-3 with further 64 built by the Naval Aircraft Factory as the SON-1.
SOC-3A
All SOC-4s were transferred to the U.S. Navy in 1942 (BuNo 48243, 48244, 48245, respectively), which modified them SOC-3A standard, meaning the fitting of a deck arrester gear.
SOC-4 (Curtiss Model 71F)
The U.S. Coast Guard acquired the final three SOC-3 Seagulls produced by Curtiss in 1938 and these were designated as SOC-4s. They were assigned the USCG call numbers V171, V172, and V173.
SO2C
One built for evaluation based on the SOC-3, but with a 5-foot fuselage stretch and powered by a R-1340-35.
SON-1
SOC-3 aircraft produced by the Naval Aircraft Factory, 64 built.

== Operators ==
United States

- United States Navy
- United States Marine Corps
- United States Coast Guard

== Specifications (SOC-1 floatplane) ==
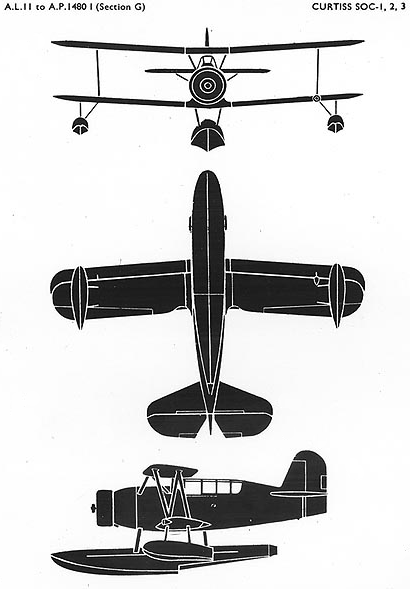
Drawings for the SOC/SON Seagull

Data from War Planes of the Second World War, Volume Six: Floatplanes

General characteristics

- Crew: two, pilot and observer
- Length: 31 ft 5 in (9.58 m)
- Wingspan: 36 ft 0 in (10.97 m)
- Height: 14 ft 9 in (4.50 m)
- Wing area: 342 sq ft (31.8 m^{2})
- Airfoil: upper: NACA 0010; lower: NACA 2212
- Empty weight: 3,788 lb (1,718 kg)
- Gross weight: 5,437 lb (2,466 kg)
- Powerplant: 1 × Pratt & Whitney R-1340-18 single-row, nine-cylinder, air-cooled radial engine, 600 hp (450 kW)

Performance

- Maximum speed: 143 kn (165 mph, 266 km/h) at 5,000 ft (1,500 m)
- Cruise speed: 116 kn (133 mph, 214 km/h)
- Stall speed: 48.6 kn (55.9 mph, 90.0 km/h)
- Range: 587 nmi (675 mi, 1,086 km) at 5,000 ft (1,500 m)
- Service ceiling: 14,900 ft (4,500 m)
- Rate of climb: 915 ft/min (4.65 m/s)

Armament

- Guns: 1× fixed, forward firing 0.30 in (7.62 mm) Browning AN/M2 and 1× flexible mounted rear-firing 0.30 in (7.62 mm) Browning AN/M2 machine gun
- Bombs: 2× 100 lb (45 kg) bombs or 325 lb (147 kg) depth charges underwing

== See also ==
Related development

- Curtiss SO3C Seamew

Aircraft of comparable role, configuration, and era

- Douglas O2D
- Fairey Seafox
- Grumman J2F Duck
- Heinkel He 114
- Mitsubishi F1M
- Potez 452
- Vought O5U

Related lists

- List of aircraft of World War II
